= Death and immortality in Middle-earth =

Theme in J. R. R. Tolkien's fiction

J. R. R. Tolkien repeatedly dealt with the theme of death and immortality in Middle-earth. He stated directly that the "real theme" of The Lord of the Rings was "Death and Immortality." (Note: Carpenter 2023, #186 to Joanna de Bortadano, draft; undated, April 1956) In Middle-earth, Men are mortal, while Elves are immortal. One of his stories, The Tale of Aragorn and Arwen, explores the willing choice of death through the love of an immortal Elf for a mortal Man. He several times revisited the Old Norse theme of the mountain tomb, containing treasure along with the dead and visited by fighting. He brought multiple leading evil characters in The Lord of the Rings to a fiery end, including Gollum, the Nazgûl, the Dark Lord Sauron, and the evil Wizard Saruman, while in The Hobbit, the dragon Smaug is killed. Their destruction contrasts with the heroic deaths of two leaders of the free peoples, Théoden of Rohan and Boromir of Gondor, reflecting the early medieval ideal of Northern courage. Despite these pagan themes, the work contains hints of Christianity, such as of the resurrection of Christ, as when the Lord of the Nazgûl, thinking himself victorious, calls himself Death, only to be answered by the crowing of a cockerel. There are, too, hints that the Elvish land of Lothlórien represents an Earthly Paradise. Scholars have commented that Tolkien clearly moved during his career from being oriented towards pagan themes to a more Christian theology.

== Context ==
J. R. R. Tolkien was a scholar of English literature, a philologist and medievalist interested in language and poetry from the Middle Ages, especially that of Anglo-Saxon England and Northern Europe. His professional knowledge of Beowulf, telling of a pagan world but with a Christian narrator, helped to shape his fictional world of Middle-earth. His intention to create what has been called "a mythology for England" (Note: Carpenter 2023, #131 to Milton Waldman, late 1951) led him to construct not only stories but a fully-formed world, Middle-earth, with languages, peoples, cultures, and history. Among his many influences were his own Roman Catholic faith, medieval languages and literature, including Norse mythology. He is best known as the author of the high fantasy works The Hobbit and The Lord of the Rings, both set in Middle-earth.

== A central theme ==
=== "Escape from Deathlessness" ===
Tolkien set out his view of "Death and Immortality" in The Lord of the Rings in a 1956 letter; Verlyn Flieger and Douglas Anderson describe this theme as "the Escape from Deathlessness":

The real theme for me is .. Death and Immortality: the mystery of the love of the world in the hearts of a race [Men] 'doomed' to leave and seemingly lose it; the anguish in the hearts of a race [Elves] 'doomed' not to leave it, until its whole evil-aroused story is complete. But if you have now read Vol. III and the story of Aragorn [and Arwen], you will have perceived that.

The scholar of fantasy Charles W. Nelson writes that this seems surprising at first sight, given the prominence of other themes like "loyalty, love, [and] the importance of compassion and selflessness". But, he comments, alongside the major battles, there are "intense scenes of particular deaths which impress the reader with their impact". He gives as instances Sam Gamgee's reaction to the death of a warrior in Ithilien, and Bilbo's "moving" final farewell to Thorin Oakenshield as the Dwarf-leader dies. He argues, too, that a central event in The Hobbit is the death of the dragon Smaug, (Note: Tolkien 1937, ch. 14 "Fire and Water") while the novel sees the three trolls turned to stone, and the deaths of many goblins and their King. As for The Lord of the Rings, Nelson writes, the dead are well represented by "the Barrowwights, the Dead whom Aragorn leads out of the White Mountains, the dead elves and men [who] Frodo sees in the Dead Marshes with their mysterious candles, and the Black Riders who are among the living dead." The deaths of major characters, including Boromir, Denethor, Gollum, Saruman, Sauron, Théoden, and Wormtongue all form "significant scenes", while Gandalf both dies and returns from the dead.

Mortality is confronted in the first chapter of The Lord of the Rings, as Bilbo Baggins states that he feels he needs "a holiday, a very long holiday... Probably a permanent holiday: I don't expect I shall return." Giovanni Carmine Costabile comments that Bilbo means he will go to Rivendell to rest; but that it is also a metaphor for death. (Note: Tolkien 1954a, book 1, ch. 1 "A Long-expected Party")

Immortality, too, is represented in multiple ways in The Lord of the Rings. The Elves are immortal, while other races like the Dwarves and the Ents are long-lived. There is, as Nelson states, "a complex system of otherworlds and eternal dwellings" for when members of the various races leave Middle-earth. And the One Ring tempts and corrupts partly through its promise of immortality.

=== Men and Elves ===
The medievalist Verlyn Flieger writes that nobody knows where Men go to when they die and leave Middle-earth, and that the nearest Tolkien came to dealing with the question was in his essay On Fairy-Stories. There, "after speculating that since 'fairy-stories are made by men not by fairies', they must deal with what he called the Great Escape, the escape from death. He went on to the singular assertion that 'the Human-stories of the elves are doubtless full of the Escape from Deathlessness'." (Note: Tolkien 1964, "On Fairy-Stories", p. 59) Flieger suggests that two of the "human stories" of Tolkien's Elves really focus on this kind of escape, the Tale of Beren and Lúthien and The Tale of Aragorn and Arwen, where in both cases a half-elf makes her escape from deathlessness. The Tolkien scholar Tom Shippey comments that "the themes of the Escape from Death, and the Escape from Deathlessness, are vital parts of Tolkien's entire mythology." In a 1968 BBC television broadcast, Tolkien quoted French philosopher Simone de Beauvoir and described the inevitability of death as the "key-spring of The Lord of the Rings". (Note: As described by Armstrong (1998) and Lee (2018), Tolkien stated: "human stories [are] always about one thing aren't they? Death: the inevitability of death" and then pulled a newspaper cutting from his pocket and read out the following quote from de Beauvoir's A Very Easy Death (1964): "There is no such thing as a natural death. Nothing that happens to man is ever natural, since his presence calls the whole world into question. All men must die, but for every man his death is an accident, and even if he knows it and consents to it, an unjustifiable violation.")

In "The Tale of Aragorn and Arwen", Tolkien exemplifies this theme, as the Elf Arwen falls in love with a mortal Man, Aragorn, and despite her father's opposition, eventually marries him, giving up her immortality in the process. (Note: Tolkien 1955, Appendix A: The Tale of Aragorn and Arwen) The creator Ilúvatar offers Aragorn the "gift" of choosing the time of his death; the scholar John D. Rateliff has contrasted this with the way the Elves cling to the past, and are inevitably swept away with it.

Tolkien's Elves remain unwearied with age. They can recover from wounds which would be fatal to a Man, but can be killed in battle. Spirits of dead Elves go to the Halls of Mandos in Valinor, a sort of Earthly Paradise, for an afterlife. After a period of rest that serves as "cleansing", their spirits are clothed in bodies identical to their old ones. (Note: Tolkien 1993, The Converse of Manwë and Eru, pp. 361–364) If they do not die in battle or accident, Elves eventually grow weary of Middle-earth and desire to go to Valinor; (Note: Tolkien 1977, ch. 1 "Of the Beginning of Days") they often sail from the Grey Havens, where Círdan the Shipwright dwells with his folk. (Note: Tolkien 1977, ch. 20 "Of the Fifth Battle: Nirnaeth Arnoediad") (Note: Tolkien 1977, "Of the Rings of Power and the Third Age") Eventually, all Elves that remain in Middle-earth undergo a process of "fading", in which their immortal spirits overwhelm and "consume" their bodies. This renders their bodily forms invisible to mortal eyes, except to those to whom they wish to manifest themselves. (Note: Tolkien 1993, "Laws and Customs among the Eldar") (Note: Tolkien 1993, "Myths Transformed", XI)

The situation with Tolkien's Dwarves is unclear. In The Hobbit, the dying Thorin says "I go now to the halls of waiting to sit beside my fathers, until the world is renewed." Douglas Anderson, commenting on this in The Annotated Hobbit, writes that this may reflect the Dwarves' own beliefs – that they had an Elf-like afterlife, but that it does not accord with what Tolkien wrote in The Silmarillion or elsewhere in his legendarium.

Fates of Elves and Men in Tolkien's legendarium. Elves are immortal but can be killed in battle, in which case they go to the Halls of Mandos in Aman for an afterlife. They may be restored by the Will of the Valar, and then go to live with the Valar in Valinor, like an Earthly Paradise, though just being in the place does not confer immortality, as Men supposed. Men are mortal, and when they die they go beyond the circles of the world, even the Elves not knowing where that might be.

=== Lothlórien: an earthly paradise ===
When the tired Fellowship reaches the idyllic Elvish land of Lothlórien, the land with "no stain", it is obliged to cross two rivers. Shippey writes that they first wash off the stains of ordinary life by wading the River Nimrodel. He compares this perfect place to the Earthly Paradise that the dreamer speaks of in the Middle English poem Pearl. Then the Fellowship have to cross a rope-bridge over a second river, the Silverlode, which they must not drink from or touch, and which the evil Gollum cannot cross. What place can they have come to then, he wonders: could they be "as if dead"? Shippey comments that the Fellowship "undergoes a kind of death in getting there", noting that the fact they are not allowed to touch the water seems to carry meaning. The travellers notice, too, that time seems to pass differently in Lothlórien. (Note: Tolkien 1954a, book 2, ch. 6 "Lothlórien"; ch. 7 "The Mirror of Galadriel"; ch. 8 "Farewell to Lórien") He comments that

A determined allegorist (or mythiciser) might go on to identify the Nimrodel with baptism, the Silverlode with death.

Shippey at once states that this suggestion is counteracted by Sam Gamgee's earthy practicality, making the rivers "tactical obstacles and not symbols for something else." All the same, he writes, the suggestion is there, making the passage, and the novel as a whole, work simultaneously on multiple levels of Northrop Frye's classification of literary modes.

== Themes from the Norse ==
=== Mountain tombs ===
Tolkien repeatedly adapts the Norse motif of the mountain tomb. The medievalist Marjorie Burns writes that while Tolkien does not precisely follow the Norse model, "his mountains tend to encase the dead and include settings where treasure is found and battles occur."

Marjorie Burns's analysis of the Norse nature of Middle-earth mountains
Mountain	Burial	Treasure	Fighting
Lonely Mountain	Thorin	Smaug's dragon's hoard	Battle of the Five Armies
Moria (under the Dwimorberg)	Balin	Mithril	Fellowship vs Orcs, Trolls, and the Balrog
Mount Doom	Gollum	The One Ring	Frodo and Sam vs Gollum
Barrow-downs	A prince of Arnor	Barrow-wight's hoard	Frodo vs disembodied arm; Tom Bombadil vs Barrow-wight

=== Destruction of the adversaries ===
Burns writes that multiple monstrous or evil characters in Middle-earth die deaths that would befit "the [undead] afterwalkers of Old Norse sagas", being destroyed by fire sufficient to eliminate them completely. Gollum is, she writes, "a thieving, kin-murdering, treasure-hoarding, sun-hating, underground dweller who ought to be dead," much like the Barrow-wight. As Gollum states: "We are lost, lost... No name, no business, no Precious, nothing. Only empty. Only hungry; yes, we are hungry". (Note: Tolkien 1954, book 4, ch. 6 "The Forbidden Pool") Flieger suggests that Gollum is Tolkien's central monster-figure, likening him to both Grendel and the Beowulf dragon, "the twisted, broken, outcast hobbit whose manlike shape and dragonlike greed combine both the Beowulf kinds of monster in one figure". Burns comments that Gollum has other attributes from the undead of Norse myth: supernatural strength, demanding that he be wrestled; he may appear to be black, but has "bone-white" skin; and he is brought to an end by fire, the final resort for "stopping the restless dead". In similar vein, the Nazgûl, already wraiths, are destroyed at the same time as the One Ring, blazing in their final flight, "shooting like flaming bolts" and ending in "fiery ruin" as they are burnt out. (Note: Tolkien 1955, book 3, ch. 3 "Mount Doom") Burns states that Tolkien creates "quite a pattern" for characters "who would take more than their due and who have aligned themselves with death", naming Sauron, Saruman, and Denethor as instances of those who come to a "final and well-deserved destruction".

Marjorie Burns's analysis of the living deaths and fiery ends of evil characters in Middle-earth
Evil character	Actions	Death
Sauron	Creates the One Ring to dominate Middle-earth; uses it to build Mordor and the Dark Tower; becomes the "Necromancer", communing with the dead	"Virtually indestructible": undone by fire, his shadow blown away
Saruman	Imitator of Sauron; creates an army in Isengard, dwells in the tower of Orthanc; has sided with death	As a Maia, should be immortal; turns to "grey mist ... like smoke from a fire"; is blown away by the wind
Denethor	Lives in dying city of Minas Tirith; plans to die, killing his one remaining son Faramir with him	Burns to death on funeral pyre, holding his magical Palantír

=== Heroic deaths ===
The death of Théoden

"Farewell, Master Holbytla!" he said. "My body is broken. I go to my fathers. And even in their mighty company I shall not now be ashamed. I felled the black serpent. A grim morn, and a glad day, and a golden sunset!"

... And those who stood by wept, crying: 'Théoden King! Théoden King!'

But Éomer said to them:

Mourn not overmuch! Mighty was the fallen,
meet was his ending. When his mound is raised,
women then shall weep. War now calls us!

— The Lord of the Rings, book 5, ch. 6 "The Battle of the Pelennor Fields"

Against the deserved obliteration of the adversaries, The Lord of the Rings sets the heroic deaths of two leading figures of the free peoples, King Théoden of Rohan and Boromir of Gondor. Like King Theodoric I of the Visigoths, Théoden dies leading his men into battle. He rallies his men shortly before he falls and is crushed by his horse. And like Theodoric, Théoden is carried from the battlefield with his knights weeping and singing for him while the battle still goes on. The scholar of religion Peter Kreeft writes that "it is hard not to feel your heart leap with joy at Théoden's transformation into a warrior", however difficult people find the old Roman view that it is sweet to die for your country, dulce et decorum est pro patria mori. Shippey writes that Rohan is directly calqued on Anglo-Saxon England, taking many features from Beowulf. He states that Tolkien's lament for Théoden, written in Anglo-Saxon-style alliterative verse, equally closely echoes the dirge that ends the Old English poem Beowulf, which celebrates the life and death of its eponymous hero.

Boromir, a member of the Fellowship of the Ring, falls to the temptation to try to seize the One Ring, intending to use it to defend Gondor. This at once splits the Fellowship, and leads to Boromir's death as Orcs attack. He redeems himself, however, by single-handedly but vainly defending Merry and Pippin from orcs, dying a hero's death. Scholars have stated that this illustrates the Catholic theme of the importance of good intention, especially at the point of death. As Gandalf states: "But he [Boromir] escaped in the end.... It was not in vain that the young hobbits came with us, if only for Boromir's sake." (Note: Tolkien 1954, book 3, ch. 5 "The White Rider") Boromir is given a boat-funeral, (Note: Tolkien 1954, book 5, ch. 4 "The Siege of Gondor") echoing early Germanic ship burials, such as for the ancestral hero Scyld Scefing in Beowulf, and later medieval ritual for noble funerals.

== Towards a Christian theology ==
The Tolkien scholar Deidre A. Dawson writes that Elizabeth Whittingham's 2008 study The Evolution of Tolkien's Mythology reveals one especially strong pattern in the 12-volume The History of Middle-earth: Tolkien's "steady movement" from pagan archetypes towards a Bible-inspired mythology. In particular, Whittingham's chapter on "Death and immortality among Elves and Men" compares the attitude to death of Tolkien's writings with those of classical and Norse myth and with Judeo-Christian theology, and studies Tolkien's reflections on where the soul goes after death. Whittingham analyses the "Athrabeth Finrod ah Andreth" (published in Morgoth's Ring) as a sometimes hopeful, sometimes despairing look at whether death was given to mortals as a gift or as a punishment in consequence of a fall from grace, and whether Eru has abandoned both Men and Elves to their fate, or will bring about the healing of Arda."

=== Elvish reincarnation ===
Early in his career, Tolkien adopted the idea that Elves would be reincarnated if killed in battle. He applied the concept to just one Elf, Glorfindel, who was killed in the Fall of Gondolin in the First Age. Glorfindel is seen again as an Elf-Lord in The Lord of the Rings, lending Frodo his horse to escape the Nazgûl and reach the safety of Rivendell. (Note: Tolkien 1954a, book 1, ch. 12 "Flight to the Ford") Dawson writes that since Christian theology does not endorse reincarnation, Tolkien may have chosen to retain the concept to enable Elves to be both immortal and able to die in battle.

Anna Milon writes that Tolkien introduces two concepts in one of his letters, "serial longevity" and "hoarding memory" as "escapes" from both death and immortality. (Note: Carpenter 2023, #211 to Rhona Beare, 14 October 1958) In her view, this means that immortality, normally defined as "exemption from death", is not death's opposite, as both can be "escape[d]". She comments that the two concepts represent Tolkien's attempts to avoid speaking of reincarnation, again because it was seen as unorthodox within Catholicism. Milon describes several states "between the living and the dead" produced by Tolkien's thinking about the boundaries of life and death, mortality and immortality.

Anna Milon's analysis of Middle-earth states between living and dead
Beings	Situation	State
Míriel	Soul has left her body, which "remained unwithered"	Vegetative state, living body, no consciousness
Army of the Dead	Cursed "to rest never until [their] oath is fulfilled"	Dwindled physically; walk as spirits
Ringwraiths	Under the influence of the Great Rings	"invisible permanently and [walk] in the twilight under the eye of the dark power that rules the Rings" (Note: Tolkien 1954a, book 1, ch. 2 "The Shadow of the Past")
Elves	e.g. Arwen, grief-stricken	"fading", "a state of living death, a perpetuity spent in stasis"

=== Death and resurrection ===
The Lord of the Nazgûl receives an answer

"Old fool!" he said. "Old fool! This is my hour. Do you not know Death when you see it? Die now and curse in vain!" And with that he lifted high his sword and flames ran down the blade.

And in that very moment, away behind in some courtyard of the city, a cock crowed. Shrill and clear he crowed, recking nothing of war nor of wizardry, welcoming only the morning that in the sky far above the shadows of death was coming with the dawn. And as if in answer there came from far away another note. Horns, horns, horns, in dark Mindolluin's sides they dimly echoed. Great horns of the north wildly blowing. Rohan had come at last.

— The Lord of the Rings, book 5, ch. 4 "The Siege of Gondor"

Shippey notes that at the moment in The Lord of the Rings when the Wizard Gandalf confronts the Lord of the Nazgûl at the gates of the city of Minas Tirith, the Nazgûl calls himself "Death", supposing that his moment of victory had arrived. But instead there is a eucatastrophe, with the crowing of a cockerel, reminiscent of the one that "crowed to Simon Peter just as he denied Christ the third time", and the arrival of the army of Rohan. Shippey writes that that Biblical event surely meant "that there was a Resurrection, that from now on Simon's despair and fear of death would be overcome."

This is not the only hint of resurrection in the work. Several commentators have seen Gandalf's passage through the Mines of Moria, dying to save his companions and returning as "Gandalf the White", as a symbol of the resurrection of Christ.

In another example, Frodo carries a burden of evil on behalf of the whole world, just as Jesus carried his cross for the sins of mankind. Frodo walks his "Via Dolorosa" to Mount Doom, just like Jesus who made his way to Golgotha. As Frodo approaches the Cracks of Doom, the Ring becomes a crushing weight, just as the cross was for Jesus. Sam Gamgee, Frodo's servant, who carries Frodo up to Mount Doom, parallels Simon of Cyrene, who helps Jesus by carrying his cross. When Frodo accomplishes his mission, like Christ, he says "it is done". Just as Christ ascends to heaven, Frodo's life in Middle-earth comes to an end when he takes ship to the Undying Lands.

== Sources ==
- Burns, Marjorie (2014). "Night-wolves, Half-trolls and the Dead Who Won't Stay Down". In Houghton, John Wm.; Croft, Janet Brennan; Martsch, N. (eds.). Tolkien in the New Century: Essays in Honor of Tom Shippey. McFarland. pp. 182–196. ISBN 978-1-4766-1486-1.
- Carpenter, Humphrey (1977). J. R. R. Tolkien: A Biography. New York: Ballantine Books. ISBN 978-0-04-928037-3.
- Carpenter, Humphrey, ed. (2023) [1981]. The Letters of J. R. R. Tolkien: Revised and Expanded Edition. New York: HarperCollins. ISBN 978-0-35-865298-4.
- Chance, Jane (2003). Tolkien the Medievalist. Routledge. ISBN 978-0-415-47348-4. OCLC 53706034.
- Flieger, Verlyn (2005). Interrupted Music: The Making of Tolkien's Mythology. Kent State University Press. ISBN 978-0-87338-824-5.
- Helen, Daniel, ed. (2017). Death and Immortality in Middle-Earth: Proceedings of the Tolkien Society Seminar 2016. Luna Press. ISBN 978-1-911143-33-8.
- Shippey, Tom (2001). J. R. R. Tolkien: Author of the Century. HarperCollins. ISBN 978-0261-10401-3.
- Shippey, Tom (2005) [1982]. The Road to Middle-Earth: How J. R. R. Tolkien Created a New Mythology (Third ed.). HarperCollins. ISBN 978-0-261-10275-0.
- Solopova, Elizabeth (2009). Languages, Myths and History: An Introduction to the Linguistic and Literary Background of J. R. R. Tolkien's Fiction. New York City: North Landing Books. ISBN 978-0-9816607-1-4.
- Tolkien, J. R. R. (1937). The Hobbit. United Kingdom: George Allen & Unwin.
- Tolkien, J. R. R. (1954a). The Fellowship of the Ring. The Lord of the Rings. Boston: Houghton Mifflin. OCLC 9552942.
- Tolkien, J. R. R. (1954). The Two Towers. The Lord of the Rings. Boston: Houghton Mifflin. OCLC 1042159111.
- Tolkien, J. R. R. (1955). The Return of the King. The Lord of the Rings. Boston: Houghton Mifflin. OCLC 519647821.
- Tolkien, J. R. R. (1964). J. R. R. Tolkien: Tree and Leaf. London: HarperCollins.
- Tolkien, J. R. R. (1977). Christopher Tolkien (ed.). The Silmarillion. Boston: Houghton Mifflin. ISBN 978-0-395-25730-2.
- Tolkien, J. R. R. (1993). Christopher Tolkien (ed.). Morgoth's Ring. Boston: Houghton Mifflin. ISBN 0-395-68092-1.
