= Glorfindel =

Fictional elf in Tolkien's Middle-Earth

- Middle-earth character

In-universe information
- Alias: Lord of the House of the Golden Flower of Gondolin
- Race: Elves
- Book(s): The Fellowship of the Ring (1954); The Silmarillion (1977); Children of Húrin (2007); The Fall of Gondolin (2018)

Glorfindel (Sindarin pronunciation: [ɡlɔrˈfindɛl]) is a fictional character in J. R. R. Tolkien's Middle-earth legendarium. He is a member of the Noldor, one of the three groups of High Elves. The character and his name, which means "blond" or "golden-haired", were among the first created for what would become part of his Middle-earth legendarium in 1916–17, beginning with the initial draft of The Fall of Gondolin. His name indicates his hair as a mark of his distinction, as the Noldor were generally dark-haired. A character of the same name appears in the first book of The Lord of the Rings, The Fellowship of the Ring, which takes place in Middle-earth's Third Age. Within the story, he is depicted as a powerful Elf-lord who could withstand the Nazgûl, wraith-like servants of Sauron, and holds his own against some of them single-handedly. Glorfindel and a version of the story of the Fall of Gondolin appear in The Silmarillion, posthumously published in 1977.

In later writings, Tolkien explored Glorfindel's backstory in various material relating to the First Age of Middle-earth. He worked out how both characters named Glorfindel could be one and the same, something not evident from the published version of The Lord of the Rings; the question has been debated by scholars. The incremental changes made to Glorfindel's character, most notably the introduction of the theme of reincarnation, as part of the ongoing development of Tolkien's legendarium have been analysed by scholars.

In Peter Jackson's 2001 live-action film The Lord of the Rings: The Fellowship of the Ring, Glorfindel's role of rescuing Frodo from the pursuing Nazgûl by lending his horse is given to the elf Arwen. He has also featured in various video games.

== Development ==
=== Conception and creation ===
Coat of arms of Bar-en-Lothglor (House of the Golden Flower), borne on the shields of armed forces led by Glorfindel. (Note: Tolkien 1984b, III "The Fall of Gondolin")

In The Fall of Gondolin, which details the conquest of the Elven city Gondolin by the Dark Lord Morgoth, Tolkien writes that Glorfindel's name "meaneth Goldtress for his hair was golden". It was the first part of The Book of Lost Tales to be written, circa 1916–17, and the story was read aloud by Tolkien to the Exeter College Essay Club in the spring of 1920. The Fall of Gondolin appears in compressed form in The Silmarillion, where the character is called "yellow-haired Glorfindel". According to Tolkien's son, Christopher Tolkien, "this was from the beginning the meaning of his name". An Elf of the same name appears in The Lord of the Rings, written many years after the original draft of The Fall of Gondolin: in The Fellowship of the Ring, he appears to assist the hobbit Frodo Baggins in his attempt to escape the servants of the Dark Lord Sauron, Morgoth's successor. (Note: Tolkien 1954a, book 1, ch. 12 "Flight to the Ford")

As his ideas changed and evolved over the years, Tolkien wrote about Glorfindel's backstory at various times. In the very first draft of the "Council of Elrond", which was to become The Fellowship of the Ring, the members of the Fellowship were to be Frodo, Gandalf, Trotter (later Strider/Aragorn), Glorfindel, Durin son of Balin (who became Gimli son of Glóin), Sam, Merry and Pippin; Boromir and Legolas did not come in until much later. Early notes for the Council of Elrond state that Glorfindel "tells of his ancestry in Gondolin". In the final published version of The Fellowship of the Ring, Legolas is the representative of the Elven people, though the power that Tolkien attributed to Glorfindel remains as he is depicted as being strong enough to stand against the Nazgûl, and so he is chosen to guide Frodo to safety from them.

Towards the end of his life, Tolkien would devote his last writings to the issue of Glorfindel and some related topics, as detailed in The Peoples of Middle-earth. (Note: Tolkien 1996, ch. 13 "Last Writings", "The Five Wizards") Christopher Tolkien stated that his father had not conceived the Glorfindel of The Lord of the Rings as the same person as the similarly named Elf of Gondolin, but had simply reused the name. (Note: Tolkien 1996, ch. 13 "Last Writings", "Glorfindel") The issue lay in Tolkien's original conception of the spirits of dead Elves as being re-embodied in their old bodies after a Purgatory-like period in the Halls of Mandos in Valinor, the home of Tolkien's "gods", the Valar and Maiar, where Elves previously lived before (re)migrating to Middle-earth. After being re-embodied, previously dead Elves stay in Valinor permanently.

Tolkien eventually decided that each Elf's name should be unique, and therefore the two Glorfindels should be one and the same. In 1972, he wrote an essay in which he explains how Glorfindel returns to Middle-earth following his death in the First Age. On Glorfindel's status as a Noldor Exile, Tolkien noted that Glorfindel left Valinor reluctantly and is blameless in the Kinslaying, and since his sacrifice in defeating the Balrog was deemed to be "of vital importance to the designs of the Valar", he is granted an exemption to the Exiles' ban and purged of any guilt. Once restored and allowed to dwell in Valinor, his spiritual power is greatly enhanced, almost an equal of the Maiar. Tolkien considered having Glorfindel as a companion to Gandalf during the latter's travel to Middle-earth in the Third Age, but changed his mind as breaching the divide between Valinor and the "Circles of the World" would make him "of greater power and importance than seems fitting". He proposed that Glorfindel is sent back to Middle-earth by the Valar during the Second Age c. 1600, when Barad-dûr was completed and Sauron forged the One Ring, and while Númenor was still friendly with the Elves under Tar-Minastir. In one version he is sent as a predecessor to the Istari (Wizards); in a different version, he arrived in Middle-earth together with the Blue Wizards. At one point he was even considered as a possibility for the identity of one of the Wizards, but Tolkien abandoned the idea since the Elves were not initially conceived as possibilities for the Wizards, and he had come to the conclusion that they were exclusively Maiar.

== Biography ==
=== The First Age ===
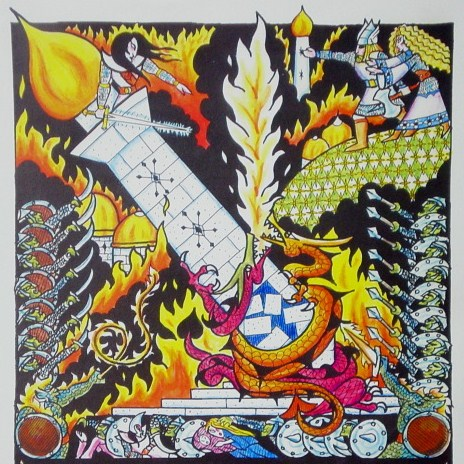
The collapse of Turgon's Tower during the Fall of Gondolin. Artwork by Tom Loback

According to The Silmarillion, Glorfindel was born around the time of the Years of the Trees in Valinor. He was part of the host of Turgon, but only followed Turgon because of their kinship. He took no part in the Kinslaying at Alqualondë, but followed the rest of the Noldor host in their exile. Glorfindel later appears as a noble lord, one of King Turgon's chief lieutenants who oversees his retreat during the Battle of Unnumbered Tears. After fighting in the city's defence, Glorfindel escaped together with Tuor, Idril, Eärendil and others. The survivors passed through the Encircling Mountains above Gondolin. However, they were ambushed by enemies, including a Balrog. Glorfindel fought the Balrog and succeeded in slaying the monster, but was himself mortally wounded. His body was recovered by the great eagle Thorondor and buried under a stone cairn, where afterward grew yellow flowers. The Fall of Gondolin relates that "Glorfindel and the Balrog" became an in-universe proverb used in Elven culture to describe great skill and courage in battle.

Following his death in the First Age, Glorfindel's spirit passed to the halls of Mandos in Valinor. The Valar eventually sent him back to Middle-Earth on a similar mission to that of the Istari, who appeared several thousand years later.

=== The Third Age ===
In The Fellowship of the Ring, Glorfindel was sent by Elrond of Rivendell in the direction that the Nazgûl were most likely to come from, to help the hobbit Frodo reach Rivendell. He set Frodo on his horse, Asfaloth, and has the hobbit riding ahead to the other side of the Ford of Bruinen, where he defies his pursuers. During his confrontation with Nazgûl at the Bridge of Mitheithel, Glorfindel reveals himself as a mighty Elf-lord terrible in his wrath; Frodo saw him as a shining figure. He is nearly captured, but manages to drive the Nazgûl into the nearby river with the aid of Strider and Frodo's hobbit companions, where they were swept away by a wave of water resembling charging horses, an enchantment created by Elrond and Gandalf. While enjoying the hospitality of the Elves in Rivendell, Frodo was enchanted by the beauty and stature of Glorfindel and his kinfolk. (Note: Tolkien 1954a, book 2, ch. 1 "Many Meetings") He sat in honour next to Elrond and Gandalf in the Hall of Fire in Rivendell, and was part of the Council of Elrond which deliberated on their collective response to the discovery of the One Ring. He showed unusual wisdom by voicing caution about sending the Ring to the enigmatic Tom Bombadil, and suggested that the Ring be destroyed and that the Three Rings of the Elves be sacrificed to accomplish this quest.

Gandalf described Glorfindel as "one of the mighty of the Firstborn" and "an Elf-lord of a house of princes." When Frodo asks about the protection of Rivendell from Sauron's forces, Gandalf explains:

In Rivendell there live still some of his chief foes: the Elven-wise, lords of the Eldar from beyond the furthest seas. They do not fear the Ringwraiths, for those who have dwelt in the Blessed Realm live at once in both worlds, and against both the Seen and the Unseen they have great power.

When Elrond seeks to fill the last two spots in the Fellowship to destroy the One Ring with folk of his own house, Gandalf mentioned Glorfindel. He justified the inclusion of Merry Brandybuck and Pippin Took by saying: (Note: Tolkien 1954a, book 2, ch. 3 "The Ring Goes South")

I think, Elrond, that in this matter it would be well to trust rather to their friendship than to great wisdom. Even if you chose for us an elf-lord, such as Glorfindel, he could not storm the Dark Tower, nor open the road to the Fire by the power that is in him.

One of the Appendices usually published with the third volume, The Return of the King, relates that earlier in the Third Age, Glorfindel led the Elvish forces of Rivendell, the Grey Havens, and Lothlórien against Angmar in the Battle of Fornost. There he fought alongside Eärnur, the future king of Gondor, along with the remnants of Gondor's sister kingdom Arnor. When the Witch-king of Angmar, Lord of the Nazgûl and chief servant of Sauron, rode out to defend his ruling seat at the captured Fornost, his presence frightened Eärnur's horse and sent the prince flying backwards, and the Witch-king mocked him. Glorfindel confronted the Witch-king, who fled into the night. Eärnur wished to pursue him, but Glorfindel bade him not to and prophesied the Witch-king would fall in the far future, but not by "the hand of man". (Note: Tolkien 1955, Appendix A, I, iv "Gondor and the heirs of Anarion") Many years later, during the War of the Ring, Éowyn (a woman) slays the Witch-king during the Battle of Pelennor Fields, assisted by Meriadoc Brandybuck (a hobbit (Note: Carpenter 2023, #31 to C.A. Furth of Allen & Unwin, 24 July 1938, states that Hobbits were a sub-group of Men rather than a distinct race.)). Before Éowyn's slaying of the Witch-king, the reference to "man" in the prophecy had been interpreted to mean that no human at all would slay him, rather than that no male human would do so. (Note: Tolkien 1955, book 5, ch. 6 "The Battle of the Pelennor Fields")

== Analysis ==
Alexander Lewis and Elizabeth Currie wrote that Glorfindel was a "chance reuse of no significance", and argued that Tolkien "tied himself, as well as readers and critics, in knots over the question of whether there were one or two characters of the name". Don Anger speculated that Glorfindel's unequivocal death in The Fall of Gondolin may have prevented Tolkien from making an explicit connection between this Silmarillion character and the Elf with the same name in the published version of The Lord of the Rings. Anger took the view that Tolkien's idea of a resolved story for the character was only "possibly realized" with the complete publication of the 12-volume book series The History of Middle-earth by 1996. He explained that as much of the background material for Glorfindel was unpublished when The Silmarillion was posthumously released, various Tolkien compendiums were forced into speculation to sate the curiosity of readers concerning the mystery of the character's death and sudden reappearance in The Lord of the Rings, citing The Complete Guide to Middle-earth: from The Hobbit to The Silmarillion as an example.

The theme of reincarnation and the concept of Elves being divinely empowered is explored in its fullest extent within Tolkien's legendarium through the character Glorfindel. Edmund Wainwright noted that Glorfindel is the best example of a male Elf in The Lord of the Rings who embodies his people's aspect as semi-divine beings, given his immense power. Verlyn Flieger noted that the concept of Elven incarnation had been considered by the time of the publication of The Lord of the Rings. She suggested that being a devout Catholic, Tolkien initially found the idea to be theologically problematic and biologically difficult; he eventually reached the conclusion that "it is a biological dictum" in his imaginary world, and its purpose "largely literary".

The Tolkien scholar Elizabeth Whittingham cited correspondence from readers, particularly Catholics like Father Murray and Peter Hastings. This raised questions that ultimately prompted changes to the mythology of Middle-earth, as acknowledged by Tolkien and his son Christopher. Whittingham noted that Tolkien sought to make his "secondary world" compatible with his "primary world", reconsidering his focus on metaphysical and philosophical explorations from the 1950s onwards. His revisions gradually moved the texts of his legendarium into closer alignment with Christianity. She observed that Glorfindel is a notable exception to Tolkien's later stance on abandoning one of his oldest concepts, reincarnation through rebirth, and that he is Tolkien's first attempt of contemplating the portrayal of a reincarnated elf.

In Tor.com's bi-weekly series on "Exploring the People of Middle-earth", Megan Fontenot described Glorfindel's role in The Fellowship of the Ring as a shaman-like figure, a medium who has direct access to both the spiritual (Valinor) and physical (Middle-earth) worlds, and that his purpose is to protect those who are threatened by the powers of the Shadow. She noted that his previous battle with the Balrog in the First Age essentially serves as an "initiation" to a shamanic trial and journey.

== In other media ==
=== Film and stage ===
In Ralph Bakshi's 1978 animated version, his role and lines from the narrative are given to Legolas. In Peter Jackson's 2001 live-action film The Lord of the Rings: The Fellowship of the Ring, his role is given to Arwen, who takes Frodo to the Ford and summons the floodwaters to disperse the Nazgûl through an incantation. In the British musical stage adaptation of The Lord of the Rings, which ran from June 2007 to July 2008 at the Theatre Royal Drury Lane in London's West End, the character was reimagined as a dark-haired elf-woman, played by Alma Ferović. In the 2015 film The Martian, NASA Director Teddy Sanders asks to be called Glorfindel during the discussion of Project Elrond, a secret meeting about plans to rescue stranded astronaut Mark Watney. The film's writer Drew Goddard claimed that the reference was his proudest moment in the film.

=== Games ===
Glorfindel appears as a non-player character in the 2002 video game The Lord of the Rings: The Fellowship of the Ring. He is voiced by Steve Staley. In the 2006 real-time strategy game, The Lord of the Rings: The Battle for Middle-earth II, Glorfindel's hair is silver-blond as opposed to his trademark golden-blond colour. He is featured on the game's box art, and is one of the playable hero units of the Elvish faction who rides his steed Asfaloth. In the Lord of the Rings Online, Glorfindel appeared as a non-player character. The Games Workshop tabletop strategy battle game adaptation of The Lord of the Rings features two versions of Glorfindel: In one form, he is fully clad in armour, while the other has Glorfindel clad in robes and riding Asfaloth. A version of Glorfindel appears in the Lego Lord of the Rings video game, where he is available as downloadable content.
