= The History of The Lord of the Rings =

6-9 of the 12 volumes of 'The History of Middle-earth'

- The cover of the paperback edition of The Return of the Shadow
- Editor: Christopher Tolkien
- Author: J. R. R. Tolkien
- Cover artist: Roger Garland (paperbacks); John Howe (paperbacks)
- Language: English
- Series: The History of Middle-earth
- Release number: 6, 7, 8, 9
- Subject: Tolkien's legendarium
- Genre: High fantasy Literary analysis
- Publisher: HarperCollins (UK)
- Publication date: 1988 (The Return of the Shadow); 1989 (The Treason of Isengard); 1990 (The War of the Ring); 1992 (Sauron Defeated)
- Publication place: United Kingdom
- Media type: Print (hardback and paperback)
- Pages: 512 (The Return of the Shadow); 512 (The Treason of Isengard); 496 (The War of the Ring); 496 (Sauron Defeated)
- ISBN: 978-0261102248 (The Return of the Shadow); ISBN 978-0261102200 (The Treason of Isengard); ISBN 978-0261102231 (The War of the Ring); ISBN 978-0261103054 (Sauron Defeated)
- Preceded by: The Lost Road and Other Writings
- Followed by: Morgoth's Ring

The History of The Lord of the Rings is a four-volume work by Christopher Tolkien published between 1988 and 1992 that documents his father's process of constructing The Lord of the Rings. The History is also numbered as volumes six to nine of The History of Middle-earth ("HoME").

== Contents ==
Contents by volume, with The History of Middle-earth (HoME) volume numbers
Vol.	HoME vol.	Title	Date	Contents
1	6	The Return of the Shadow	1988	Encompasses three early phases of composition, including what Tolkien later called "the crucial chapter" which sets up the central plot, "The Shadow of the Past". (Note: The Lord of the Rings, 2nd edition, "Foreword".) It finishes at the point where the Company of the Ring enter the Mines of Moria.
2	7	The Treason of Isengard	1989	Continues to the meeting with Théoden king of Rohan, and includes the invention and evolution of Lothlórien and Galadriel; plans for Frodo and Sam's progress to Mordor; the creation and development of Treebeard, the Ents, and Fangorn; discussions of the original map of Middle-earth at the end of the Third Age; and the evolution of Cirth in an appendix.
3	8	The War of the Ring	1990	Continues to the opening of the Black Gate.
4	9	Sauron Defeated (Note: Much of this volume is also published as The End of the Third Age, omitting material not related to The Lord of the Rings)	1992	Reaches the end of the narrative, and features the rejected "Epilogue", in which Sam answers his children's questions. It includes The Notion Club Papers (a time-travel story related to Númenor), a draft of the Drowning of Anadûnê (that led to Akallabêth), and the only extant account of Tolkien's constructed language Adûnaic.

The original idea was to release The History of The Lord of the Rings in three volumes, not four. When The Treason of Isengard was first published in paperback, Volume 3 (HoME 8) was to be called Sauron Defeated and was to be the last volume.

Some information on the appendices and a soon-abandoned sequel to the novel can be found in HoME 12, The Peoples of Middle-earth.

=== Titles ===
The titles of the volumes derive from discarded titles for the separate books of The Lord of the Rings. J. R. R. Tolkien conceived that novel as a single volume structured into six "books" plus extensive appendices, but his publisher split the work into three volumes, each containing two books; the appendices were included in the third. The titles proposed by Tolkien for the six books were: Book 1, The First Journey or The Ring Sets Out; Book 2, The Journey of the Nine Companions or The Ring Goes South; Book 3, The Treason of Isengard; Book 4, The Journey of the Ring-Bearers or The Ring Goes East; Book 5, The War of the Ring; and Book 6, The End of the Third Age. The title The Return of the Shadow was a discarded title for Volume 1.

Three of the titles of the volumes of The History of The Lord of the Rings were used as book titles for the seven-volume edition of The Lord of the Rings: The Treason of Isengard for Book 3, The War of the Ring for Book 5, and The End of the Third Age for Book 6.

=== Tengwar inscriptions ===
There is an inscription in Fëanorian characters (Tengwar, an alphabet Tolkien devised for the High-Elves) on the title page of each of the volumes of History of Middle-earth, written by Christopher Tolkien and describing the contents of the book.

Tengwar inscriptions by volume, with The History of Middle-earth (HoME) volume numbers
Vol.	HoME vol.	Title	Inscription
1	6	The Return of the Shadow	In the Return of the Shadow are traced the first forms of the story of the Lord of the Rings; herein the journey of the Hobbit who bore the Great Ring, at first named Bingo but afterwards Frodo, is followed from Hobbiton in the Shire through the Old Forest to Weathertop and Rivendell, and ends in this volume before the Tomb of Balin, the Dwarf-lord of Moria.
2	7	The Treason of Isengard	In The Treason of Isengard the story of the Fellowship of the Ring is traced from Rivendell through Moria and the Land of Lothlórien to the time of its ending at Salembel beside Anduin the Great river, then is told of the return of Gandalf Mithrandir, of the meeting of the hobbits with Fangorn and of the war upon the Riders of Rohan by the traitor Saruman.
3	8	The War of the Ring	In the War of the Ring is traced the story of the history at Helm's Deep and the drowning of Isengard by the Ents, then is told of the journey of Frodo with Samwise and Gollum to the Morannon, of the meeting with Faramir and the stairs of Cirith Ungol, of the Battle of the Pelennor Fields and of the coming of Aragorn in the fleet of Umbar.
4	9	Sauron Defeated	In this book is traced first the story of the destruction of the One Ring and the Downfall of Sauron at the End of the Third Age. Then follows an account of the intrusion of the Cataclysm of the West into the deliberations of certain scholars of Oxford and the Fall of Sauron named Zigûr in the Drowning of Anadûne.

== Tolkien's creativity ==
Navigable diagram of the components (brown boxes) of Tolkien's legendarium. Christopher Tolkien placed The History of The Lord of the Rings as four volumes (blue Roman numerals I..XII) within The History of Middle-earth; the volumes before and after it relate to The Silmarillion.

The History of The Lord of the Rings reveals much of the slow, aggregative nature of Tolkien's creativity. As Christopher Tolkien noted of the first two volumes, his father had eventually brought the story up to Rivendell, but still "without any clear conception of what lay before him". He also noted how, on the way, his father could get caught up in a "spider's web of argumentation" – what Tom Shippey described as getting "bogged down in sometimes strikingly unnecessary webs of minor causation". Thus (for example) the character eventually known as Pippin Took was, in a series of rewriting and of deleted adventures, variously known as Odo, Frodo, Folco, Faramond, Peregrin, Hamilcar, Fredegar, and Olo – the figures also being Boffins and Bolgers, as well as Tooks.

Only with the chapter "The Breaking of the Fellowship" did fluency finally arrive for Tolkien, his son recording how chapters were suddenly "achieved with far greater facility than any previous part of the story". (Note: Tolkien 1989, p. 410 and compare pp. 411-414) Thereafter Tolkien's problem was rather one of selecting between alternative accounts, so as to produce the best effect – two episodes in the "fascinating study" Sauron Defeated that were eventually deleted being the pardoning of Saruman, and an awards ceremony at the book's close.

== Sources ==
- Shippey, Tom (2005) [1982]. The Road to Middle-Earth (Third ed.). HarperCollins. ISBN 978-0-26110-275-0.
- Tolkien, J. R. R. (1989). Christopher Tolkien (ed.). The Treason of Isengard. Boston: Houghton Mifflin. ISBN 978-0-395-51562-4.
- Whittingham, Elizabeth A. (2017). The Evolution of Tolkien's Mythology: A Study of the History of Middle-earth. McFarland & Company. ISBN 978-1-47661-174-7.
