= Constructing The Lord of the Rings =

Literary analysis

Summary Timeline
Date	Events
Late 1937	Starts writing
Dec 1939	Pauses
Aug 1940	Restarts
1941	Pauses
1942	Restarts
1943	Pauses
Apr 1944	Rewrites first chapters
1945	Pauses
1946	Reworks Book 5
1948	Writes Book 6
1949	Revises earlier Books
1954	Vols I and II printed
1955	Writes Appendices
Oct 1955	Vol III printed

The task of constructing The Lord of the Rings was long and complex, lasting from its start in 1937, soon after the success of J. R. R. Tolkien's children's book The Hobbit, until the novel's publication in 1954–1955. Tolkien began with no idea where the story would go, and made several false starts before the tale of the One Ring emerged. The names of the characters, including the protagonists, of The Lord of the Rings changed many times. Tolkien stopped writing repeatedly, sometimes for years at a time. Inspiration, when it came, was based on practical work with maps, names, and languages that Tolkien incorporated in the novel. He illustrated places described in the text, updating drawings and text together until he felt they were correct.

== Context ==
The request for a sequel to the 1937 children's book The Hobbit prompted J. R. R. Tolkien to begin what became his most famous work: the epic novel The Lord of the Rings (first published in three volumes in 1954–1955). He eventually spent more than ten years writing the primary narrative and appendices for the novel, during which time he received the constant support of the Inklings, in particular his closest friend C. S. Lewis, the author of The Chronicles of Narnia. Both The Hobbit and The Lord of the Rings are set against the background of The Silmarillion, but in a time long after it.

Tolkien at first intended The Lord of the Rings to be a children's tale in the style of The Hobbit, but it quickly grew darker and more serious in the writing. Though a direct sequel to The Hobbit, it addressed an older audience, drawing on the immense backstory of Beleriand that Tolkien had constructed in previous years, and which eventually saw posthumous publication in The Silmarillion and other volumes. Tolkien strongly influenced the fantasy genre that grew after the book's success.

== A "long and difficult process" ==
Persuaded by his publishers, Tolkien started "a new Hobbit" in December 1937. Nick Groom comments that he had "little sense of plot or character, direction or development, meaning or significance" to guide him through the "long and difficult process". Writing was slow, because Tolkien had a full-time academic position, marked exams to bring in a little extra income, and wrote many drafts. (Note: Carpenter 2023, letter #17 to Stanley Unwin, 15 October 1937)

Tolkien abandoned the novel for most of 1943 and only restarted it in April 1944, as a serial for his son Christopher Tolkien, who was sent chapters as they were written while he was serving in South Africa with the Royal Air Force. Tolkien made another major effort in 1946, and showed the manuscript to his publishers in 1947. The story was effectively finished the next year, but Tolkien did not complete the revision of earlier parts of the work until 1949. The original manuscripts, which total 9,250 pages, now reside in the J. R. R. Tolkien Collection at Marquette University.

=== Getting started ===
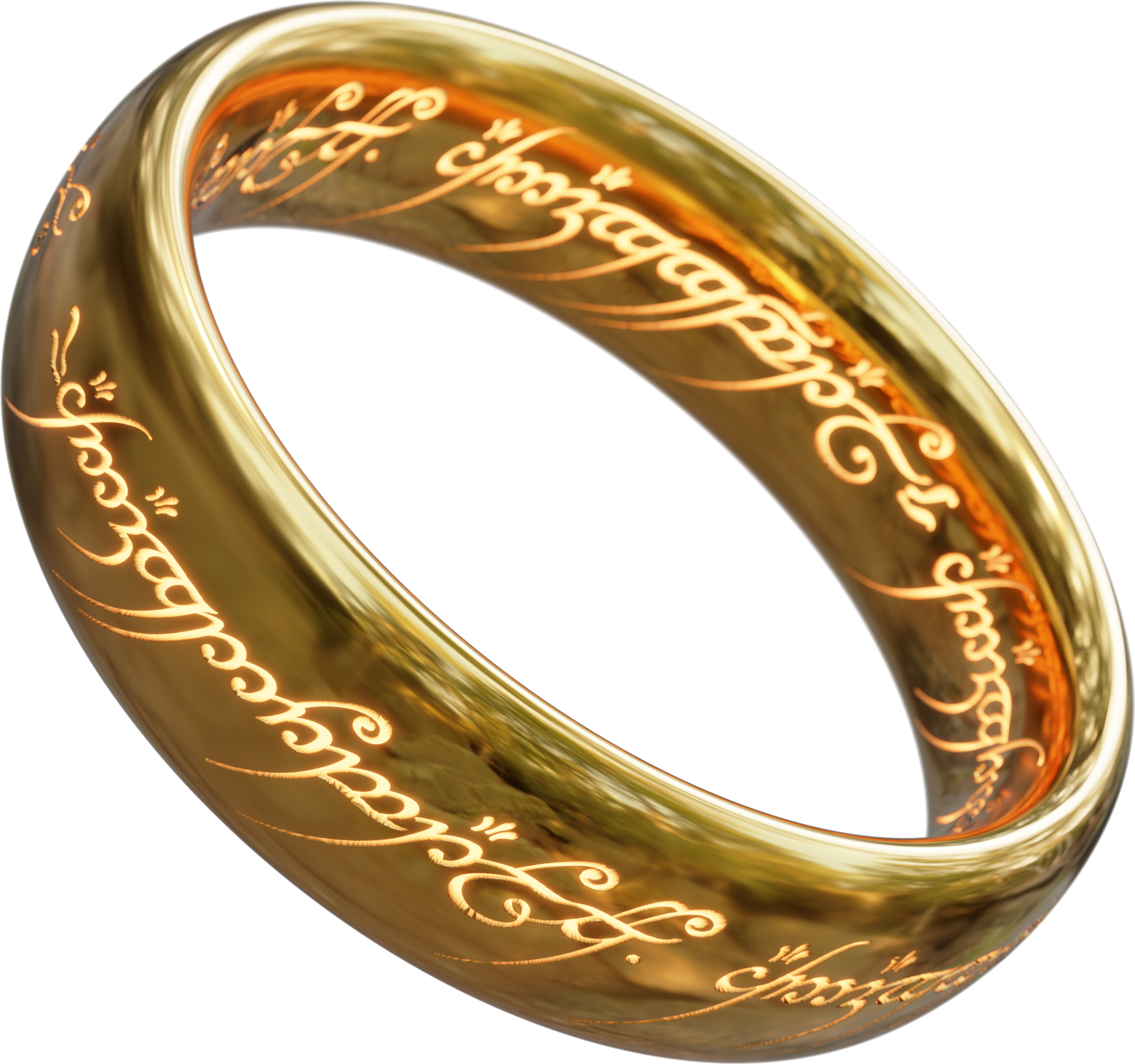
Tolkien had not realised at the outset that the One Ring would be so central to the story.

As documented in The Return of the Shadow, Tolkien had written a five-page draft, what he called the "first germ" of The Lord of the Rings, by 19 December 1937 when he claimed to his publisher "I have written the first chapter of a new story about Hobbits – 'A long expected party'." He completed a fourth, much fuller, draft of the chapter by 1 February 1938. He offered it to the publisher Stanley Unwin, for his son, the 12-year old Rayner Unwin, to read. It was Rayner who had recommended that The Hobbit should be published.

By 4 March 1938, in another letter to his publisher, he had written drafts of three chapters, 1:1 "A Long-expected Party", 1:3 "Three's Company and Four's More" (the last three words later dropped), and 1:4 "To Maggot's Farm and Buckland" (which became "A Short Cut to Mushrooms"). In the letter he stated that the story had "taken an unpremeditated turn"; Christopher Tolkien identifies this confidently as the intrusion of Black Riders into the tale. The idea for the first chapter arrived fully formed, although the reasons behind Bilbo's disappearance, the significance of the Ring, and the title The Lord of the Rings did not come until the second quarter of 1938. Originally, Tolkien had planned to write a story in which Bilbo had used up all his treasure and was looking for another adventure to gain more, but gradually both the story and the protagonists changed. Still, the work was at this stage almost completely ad hoc: the Tolkien scholar Tom Shippey comments that "what is bound to surprise anyone familiar with The Lord of the Rings who then reads Tolkien's early drafts in The Return of the Shadow is quite how little Tolkien had in the way of a plan, or even of a conception."

=== Hesitant progress ===
Tolkien at last, in David Bratman's words, "got a small band of hobbits on the road and into a series of picaresque adventures that enlarged in wordage, complexity, seriousness, and significance as fast as he could write". The way the story kept on getting more complicated led Tolkien to ask himself a rising tide of questions about the key themes of the story, especially the nature of Bilbo's Ring, but also issues like what part the other Rings should play, who Trotter was, and whether Bingo/Frodo should have Sam Gamgee as a companion. The outcome was a fresh (fifth) version, a new second chapter, "Ancient History", which became "The Shadow of the Past", and the Ring Verse. The rearrangement of the narrative brought Tolkien to the realisation that he needed an exact chronology to ensure that characters could act and meet at the right moments.

Final structure
Volumes (chosen by publisher)	Books (titles were dropped)
I: The Fellowship of the Ring	1. The Ring Sets Out; 2. The Ring Goes South
II: The Two Towers	3. The Treason of Isengard; 4. The Ring Goes East
III: The Return of the King	5. The War of the Ring; 6. The End of the Third Age

In August 1939, Tolkien wrote an outline of the novel from Rivendell to the destruction of the Ring and the "Dark Tower". The journey was to be by way of the Misty Mountains in a snowstorm, Tree Beard's forest, Moria, and the siege of Ond (Gondor). Groom notes that Isengard, Lothlórien, Rohan, Ithilien, and Cirith Ungol were not among the places visited, and that the three major battles do not feature. In his first draft of Book 2, Tolkien's plan suggests that Gandalf will fight with a Black Rider (not a Balrog) in Moria, but he already knows that the wizard has to return after falling into the abyss; he notes "probably fall is not as deep as it seemed."

In his foreword to the second edition of The Lord of the Rings, Tolkien states that in 1940, despite the war, "I plodded on [with writing], mostly by night, till I stood by Balin's tomb in Moria." He then paused for nearly a year, restarting "and so came to Lothlorien and the Great River late in 1941." (Note: Tolkien 1965, Foreword) In 1942, Tolkien made his first drafts of what became 5:1 "Minas Tirith" and 5:3 "The Muster of Rohan". He then broke off, not knowing where to take the story next: "and there as the beacons flared in Anórien and Théoden came to Harrowdale I stopped. Foresight had failed and there was no time for thought."

He returned to the novel in April 1944, working especially on what became "The Shadow of the Past", introducing the "fallen wizard" Saruman, and what Groom calls "in one daring step forward" creating the other exceptionally long chapter, "The Council of Elrond". Another major addition was the Balrog, described in a carefully ambiguous, "beautifully equivocal" way to create a monstrous inhuman presence. Tolkien then planned the remainder of the novel in more detail, to span Lothlórien, Boromir's attempt to get the Ring from Frodo; Frodo's escape; Gollum being captured by Frodo, guiding him and Sam across the Dead Marshes; and betraying them to Shelob. Meanwhile, the other characters are to be involved in battles. Drafting the Lothlórien episode, Tolkien realised that its fate, and that of Galadriel who has an Elven-ring, is tied to that of the Ring. In short, the plot was tightening.

In what became chapter 3:6 "The King of the Golden Hall", Gandalf, Aragorn, Legolas, and Gimli are greeted at Edoras, the Anglo-Saxon-style hall of King Théoden of Rohan, by a process of challenges by the guards, derived directly from Beowulf; an early version has the guards actually speaking Old English lines from the poem.

=== Getting into a fix ===
Tolkien was dissatisfied with the second half of Book 3, such as 3:7 the battle of Helm's Deep, the drowning of Isengard in 3:9 "Flotsam and Jetsam", and the dialogue in 3:10 "The Voice of Saruman" at the tower of Orthanc, and radically rewrote them. He took around a year to work out what he was going to do with the Palantír, revising the section repeatedly. At the same time, Tolkien was struggling with the narrative of Book 4, writing multiple versions of 4:2 "The Passage of the Marshes", which as he said in a letter were "a few pages for a lot of sweat." (Note: Carpenter 2023, #59 from an airgraph to Christopher Tolkien, 5 April 1944) Groom comments that "the wanderings of Frodo and Sam mirror Tolkien's writing process: frustratingly slow progress, retracing steps and going around in circles, and pursued by an obscure malice from another, earlier story."

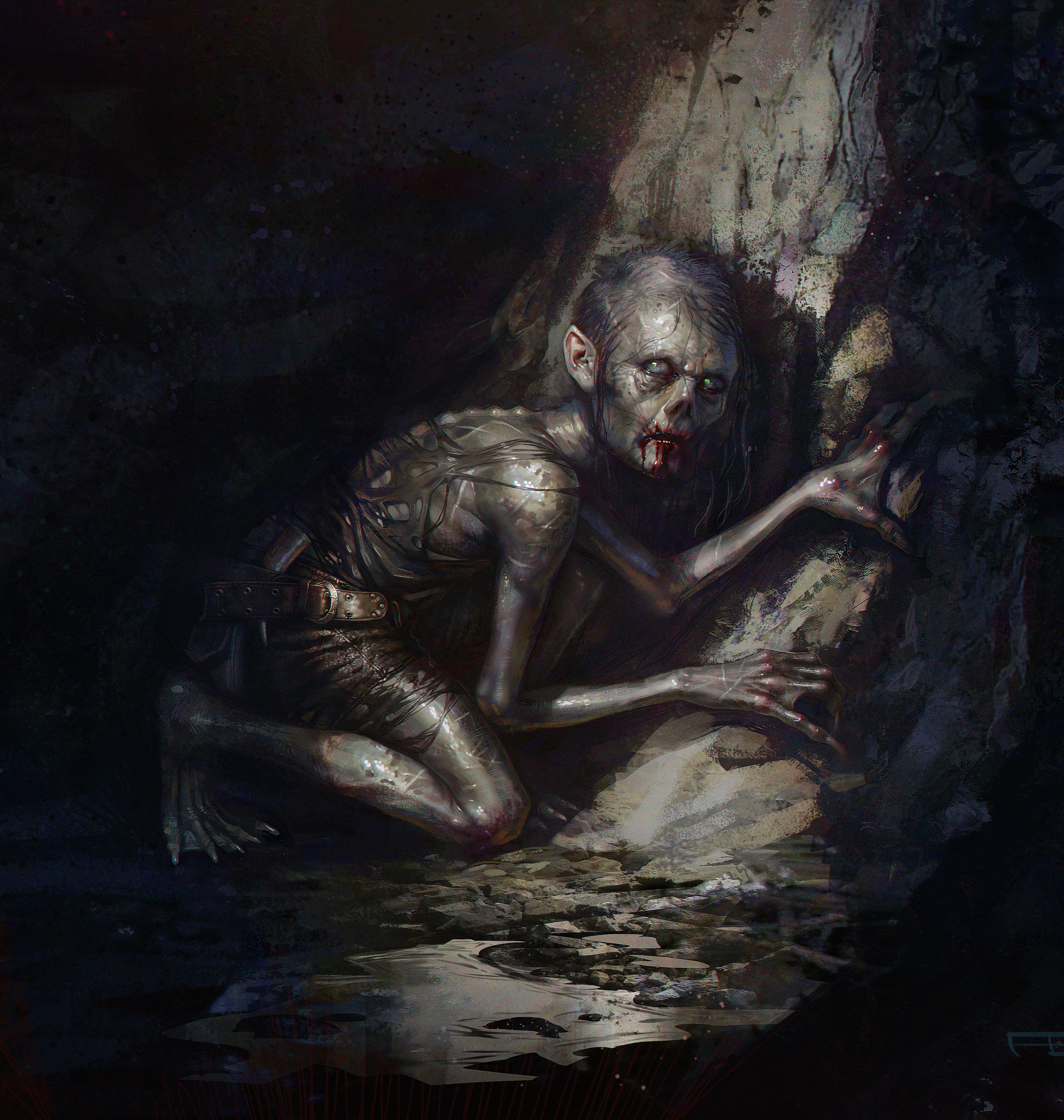
Tolkien elaborated the character of Gollum as he became more tightly tied to the Ring.

But with Gollum more and more tightly tied to the Ring, Tolkien elaborated his character and split personality, making him talk to himself, in Tolkien's words "a sort of good Smeagol angry with a bad Gollum", (Note: Tolkien 1990, pp. 105, 113–115) and becoming a guide rather than a predator. Gergely Nagy comments that the "most peculiar" character of Gollum, as seen especially in his idiolectic use of language, was achieved only through extensive rewriting: "Gollum initially spoke much more coherently and logically, so that the contrast was much less striking between his two schizophrenic selves". Tolkien was unsure, too, about choice of antagonist on the approach to Mordor; he toyed with having many giant spiders, as in The Hobbit, or just one, the ancient and powerful Ungoliant, who as Groom comments was "Morgoth's fearsome ally from The Silmarillion (and considerably more powerful than a Balrog) – before settling on Shelob."

As the story progressed, Tolkien brought in elements from The Silmarillion mythology to create an impression of depth, such as when Sam mentions a Silmaril and [Morgoth's] "Iron Crown in Thangorodrim". (Note: Tolkien 1954, book 4, ch. 8 "The Stairs of Cirith Ungol") Taking up the story again in 1946, Tolkien reworked much of Book 5, having Éowyn fatally injured when she kills the Witch-King, while Gondor's army takes the war into Mordor itself.

As documented in Sauron Defeated, Tolkien first sketched the destruction of the Ring in the fires of Mount Doom in 1939, but the story of how the Ring came to fall into the Crack was still unclear in 1941. The first draft of chapter 6:1 "The Tower of Kirith Ungol" reached the moment when Sam sees two orcs shot with arrows; it was close to its final form. The second draft adds Sam's temptation by the Ring. Tolkien drafted the orcs' capture of Frodo in 1944, which he described in a letter as "hav[ing] got the hero into such a fix that not even an author will be able to extricate him without labour and difficulty"; (Note: Carpenter 2023, #91 to Christopher Tolkien, 29 November 1944) he did not work out his escape until 1947. Tolkien completed the chapter in a third draft.

=== Finally attaining fluency ===
The start of King Aragorn's letter to Sam Gamgee, inviting him and his family to meet him on the border of the Shire. The letter is written in both English and Sindarin, using the Tengwar script. It and the rest of the epilogue were cut from the final text.

Tolkien stated in a note to a letter that the 3:4 "Treebeard" chapter "was written off more or less as it stands... almost like reading some one else's work." (Note: Carpenter 2023, #163 to W. H. Auden, 7 June 1955; also #180 to 'Mr Thompson' (draft), 14 January 1956) The chapter seemed almost, in Christopher Tolkien's words, to "write itself". 6:2 "The Land of Shadow" was likewise drafted "swiftly and in a single burst of writing". 6:3 "Mount Doom" was drafted in the same manuscript, directly without any preceding rough sketches; Christopher Tolkien suggests that his father's "long thought" about the destruction of the Ring allowed him to write the chapter "more quickly and surely than almost any earlier chapter". The drafts 6:4 "The Field of Kormallen" (later "The Field of Cormallen") and 6:5 "The Steward and the King" (initially untitled, then "Faramir and Éowyn") similarly reached almost final form in a single stage. 6:6 "Many Partings" was first drafted in the same manuscript as the previous chapter, but in a "remarkably brief and spare" form, later extended by inserting new materials. This was followed by a fair copy, and then in final form in what Christopher Tolkien called "my father's most handsome script".

6:7 "Homeward Bound" was seemingly drafted rapidly "in one long burst", along with part of the next chapter, 6:8 "The Scouring of the Shire". Initially Gandalf accompanied the hobbits to the gate to the Shire, and the story was very far from the chapter's final form. 6:9 "The Grey Havens" was first drafted in the same long manuscript as the previous two chapters. That text, as far as it went, survived largely unchanged, but several details were added, such as mentions of Fredegar Bolger, of Frodo's first illness, and of Merry and Pippin's fine clothing.

Tolkien initially drafted an epilogue about Sam Gamgee, Rosie Cotton, and their family, but it was cut from the final text of the novel. It was to have been accompanied by a facsimile of a letter from King Aragorn, in English and Sindarin, both written out in Tengwar script. The first draft of the epilogue ended with the sentence "They went in, and Sam shut the door. But even as he did so, he heard suddenly, deep and unstilled, the sigh and murmur of the Sea upon the shores of middle-earth". (Note: Tolkien 1992, p. 128)

== Tolkien's methods ==
Tolkien's writing methods included the use of non-narrative materials including maps, names, languages, and drawings to develop ideas and guide the text.

=== Maps ===
Detail of the 1943 map, redrawn by Christopher Tolkien from his father's First Map and redrawn again for publication. Many details were later changed. Here, the land of Mor-dor is accessed from the Northwest by the pass of Kirith Ungol, direct from the Battle Plain (Dagras). The volcanic mountain Orodruin is close to the mouth of the pass, with the Dark Tower to the Southeast. Another access route, the Nargil Pass, lies far to the South.

In a letter to the novelist Naomi Mitchison, Tolkien explained that he drew maps to guide his storytelling: (Note: Carpenter 2023, #144 to Naomi Mitchison, 25 April 1954)

I wisely started with a map, and made the story fit (generally with meticulous care for distances). The other way about lands one in confusions and impossibilities, and in any case it is weary work to compose a map from a story — as I fear you have found.

Tolkien's working maps evolved continuously as the story developed. His "First Map" had seen many modifications by the time Christopher Tolkien redrew it as "a large elaborate map in pencil and coloured chalks" in 1943.

Shippey notes Tolkien's discussion of "inspiration" and "mere uninspired 'invention'" in his essay "On Fairy-Stories", based on a 1939 lecture. Shippey comments that Tolkien does not appear to have begun with "a flash of 'inspiration'", rather the reverse: he began with a substantial amount of effort on practical materials like maps, and eventually inspiration followed. In his words "Maps, names and languages came before plot. Elaborating them was in a sense Tolkien's way of building up enough steam to get rolling; but they had also in a sense provided the motive to want to."

=== Names ===
The protagonists that Tolkien had brought to Buckland by 1938 were Bingo (Bilbo's "nephew", later named Frodo); Frodo; and Odo; these names came from Tolkien's 1934 poem "The Adventures of Tom Bombadil", along with Vigo and Marmaduke. Groom comments that "the names were very fluid" throughout the process of construction. Christopher Tolkien remarks that "It is characteristic that while the dramatis personae are not the same, and the story possesses as yet none of the dimension, the gravity, and the sense of vast danger, imparted by [1:2 "The Shadow of the Past"], a good part of 'Three is Company' was already in being". He adds that his father took "delight in the names and relations of the hobbit-families", and that "in no respect did [he] chop and change more copiously", noting among others Angelica and Semolina Baggins, Caramella Bolger, Marmaduke Brandybuck, Gorbaduc > Orlando Grubb, "Amalda > Lonicera or Griselda > Grimalda > Lobelia [Sackville-Baggins]".

Hobbit names in early drafts
Name	Etymology, associated meanings
Angelica	A flowering plant, its stems candied and used in cakes
Caramella	Caramel, confectionery made with burnt sugar
Lobelia	A garden flower popular in England
Lonicera	Honeysuckle, a climbing plant with sweet-smelling flowers, native to England
Semolina	A sweet dessert traditional in England

Chapter 1:10 "Strider", at first untitled, had the hobbit protagonists in Barnabas Butterbur's inn at Bree meeting a person described in Gandalf's letter as "a ranger (wild hobbit) known as Trotter", since he wears wooden shoes that clatter. Trotter the wild hobbit is later "dramatically" replaced by a man, Ingold, Elfstone and, eventually, Aragorn. Shippey comments that Tolkien "stuck determinedly to the increasingly inapposite name 'Trotter'" even when "the character had become fixed as the tall and long-legged Aragorn". He criticises the speech Tolkien put in Aragorn's mouth: "But Trotter shall be the name of my house, if ever that be established, yet perhaps in the same high tongue it shall not sound so ill". (Note: Tolkien 1990, p. 390) Shippey writes that Tolkien was simply wrong here, observing that "trot" is "quite inconsonant with dignity when applied to a tall man" and stating that Tolkien "should have dropped the idea much earlier". He notes, too, that the speech defending an ill-sounding name survived into the final text, as Aragorn defends the name "Strider", making it the name of his royal line, the house of Telcontar in the "high tongue", Sindarin.

Names, too, could suggest structure and content. Shippey comments that from the most basic of names in The Hobbit, like "The Hill" and "The Water", Tolkien moved on to experiment with the use of real English placenames like "Worminghall" in Farmer Giles of Ham, playing with its imagined etymology. For The Lord of the Rings, Shippey writes that the name Farthinghoe, a village not far from Tolkien's home in Oxford, "set Tolkien thinking about the Farthings of 'The Shire'."

=== Languages ===
Tolkien's narrative was also at least partly founded on languages, both real (he was a philologist) and invented. He stated in a letter that his Middle-earth writings were "largely an essay in linguistic aesthetic". (Note: Carpenter 2023, #165 to the Houghton Mifflin Co., 30 June 1955) Shippey argues that although this may seem wild, there is evidence for it. In the Appendices to The Lord of the Rings, Tolkien explains that he chose Bree placenames such as Chetwood, and Bree itself, to give a feeling of unfamiliarity or vague Celticness.

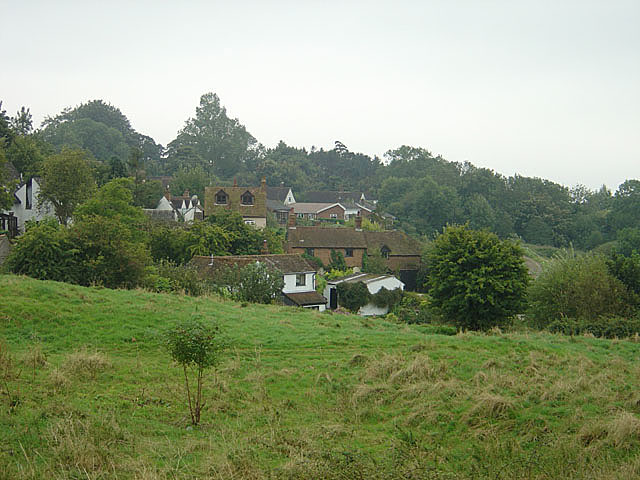
The name "Bree" was inspired by the name of the village of Brill; it contains the Celtic Breʒ and the Old English hyll, both meaning "hill".

Brill, Chetwode etymologies from Brythonic ('Celtic') and Old English

Placenames of Bree-land, with the villages of Bree, Combe, Staddle, and Archet in the Chetwood, that Tolkien meant to sound and feel Celtic.

Shippey calls the effect of Bilbo's song of Eärendil "highly Keatsian". Tolkien has Gildor's Elves sing in his invented language of Quenya in the woods of the Shire; he describes the effect the singing has on the listening hobbits. Shippey comments that Tolkien believed, more or less heretically "that untranslated elvish would do a job that English could not". Gandalf chants the Ring Verse in the Black Speech, another of his invented languages, creating a dramatically terrifying effect on his listeners. As another example, Shippey remarks Sam Gamgee's aesthetic response to Gimli's song of the Dwarf-King Durin as he hears "the ring of elvish and dwarvish names. 'I like that!' said Sam. 'I should like to learn it. In Moria, in Khazad-Dum!'". Shippey comments that "obviously his response is a model one".

A Elbereth Gilthoniel
silivren penna míriel
o menel aglar elenath!
Na-chaered palan-díriel
o galadhremmin ennorath,
Fanuilos, le linnathon
nef aear, sí nef aearon!

Tolkien's Sindarin poem
is presented untranslated.

=== Drawings ===
As Tolkien developed details of his plot, he made drawings of many of the locations involved; and as his ideas developed, so both drawings and text were updated until he felt the descriptions were correct. For example, his conception of the tower of Orthanc at the centre of the ring of Isengard, for 3:8 "The Road to Isengard" and 3:10 "The Voice of Saruman", evolved considerably while he was writing. In the earliest versions, the tower was round, rising in multiple tiers, and had three small horns on its top. Then it was to stand on a cloven hill, with a round arch supporting the weight of the tower. Finally in drawing 5, the tower was composed entirely of four tall narrow almost pyramidal horns, seemingly of bedrock not masonry, arranged to form a square, and rising straight from level ground.

Changing descriptions of Orthanc
"And in the centre... there stood ... a great cone of rock, two hundred feet in height... over the chasm was a mighty arch of masonry, and upon the arch a tower was founded, marvellously tall and strong. Seven round tiers it had, dwindling in girth and height, and at the top were three black horns of stone upon a narrow space, where a man could stand a thousand feet above the plain."	Tolkien's artwork evolved alongside his text, as here with his drawings 2, 3, and 5 of the tower of Orthanc showing how his conception of it changed.	"A peak and isle of rock it was, black, and gleaming hard; four mighty piers of many-sided stone were welded into one, but near the summit they opened into gaping horns, their pinnacles sharp as the points of spears, keen-edged as knives."

== Sources ==
=== General ===
- Bratman, David (2000). "Top Ten Rejected Plot Twists from The Lord of the Rings: A Textual Excursion into the History of 'The Lord of the Rings'". Mythlore. 22 (4 (86): 13–37.
- Carpenter, Humphrey (1977). J. R. R. Tolkien: A Biography. New York: Ballantine Books. ISBN 978-0-04-928037-3.
- Carpenter, Humphrey, ed. (2023) [1981]. The Letters of J. R. R. Tolkien: Revised and Expanded Edition. New York: HarperCollins. ISBN 978-0-35-865298-4.
- Fimi, Dimitra (2020) [2014]. "Later Fantasy Fiction: Tolkien's Legacy". In Lee, Stuart D. (ed.). A Companion to J. R. R. Tolkien. Wiley Blackwell. pp. 335–349. ISBN 978-1-119-65602-9.
- Groom, Nick (2022). Twenty-First Century Tolkien: What Middle-earth Means to Us Today. Atlantic Books. ISBN 978-1838-95700-1.
- Marquette Archives (2013). "J. R. R. Tolkien Collection". Raynor Memorial Libraries, Marquette University. Archived from the original on 19 December 2013.
- Nagy, Gergely (2006). "The "Lost" Subject of Middle-earth: The Constitution of the Subject in the Figure of Gollum in The Lord of the Rings". Tolkien Studies. 3 (1): 57–79. doi:10.1353/tks.2006.0024 – via Project Muse.
- Shippey, Tom (2001) [2000]. J. R. R. Tolkien: Author of the Century. HarperCollins. ISBN 978-0261-10401-3.
- Shippey, Tom (2005) [1982]. The Road to Middle-Earth: How J. R. R. Tolkien Created a New Mythology (Third ed.). HarperCollins. ISBN 978-0-261-10275-0.
- Tolkien, J. R. R. (1954). The Two Towers. The Lord of the Rings. Boston: Houghton Mifflin. OCLC 1042159111.
- Tolkien, J. R. R. (1965). "Foreword". The Lord of the Rings (Second ed.). Houghton Mifflin.

=== The History of The Lord of the Rings ===
In these four volumes, published as volumes six to nine of The History of Middle-earth, Christopher Tolkien analyses in detail how his father went about writing the novel.

- Tolkien, J. R. R. (1988). Christopher Tolkien (ed.). The Return of the Shadow. Boston: Houghton Mifflin. ISBN 978-0-395-49863-7.
- Tolkien, J. R. R. (1989). Christopher Tolkien (ed.). The Treason of Isengard. Boston: Houghton Mifflin. ISBN 978-0-395-51562-4.
- Tolkien, J. R. R. (1990). Christopher Tolkien (ed.). The War of the Ring. Boston: Houghton Mifflin. ISBN 0-395-56008-X.
- Tolkien, J. R. R. (1992). Christopher Tolkien (ed.). Sauron Defeated. Boston, New York, & London: Houghton Mifflin. ISBN 0-395-60649-7.
