= Vincent Ferré =

Vincent Ferré is a French scholar of comparative literature, a medievalist, and a Tolkien scholar, known especially for his book on The Lord of the Rings, Tolkien: sur les rivages de la Terre du Milieu, and for his encyclopedic Dictionnaire Tolkien.

== Life ==
Vincent Ferré was born in Mayenne, France in 1974. He gained his Baccalaureat from the Lycée Lavoisier, Mayenne in 1992, and then spent two years studying literature at the Lycée Fénelon, Paris. He gained his master's degree in 1996 in comparative literature at the Université Sorbonne Nouvelle in Paris. He spent four years at the École normale supérieure de Fontenay-Saint-Cloud. He then gained a Diplôme d'études approfondies (an additional year of study) at the Sorbonne. He completed his PhD with a thesis on Proust, Broch, and Don Passos in 2003. He has two children.

He worked in the faculty of humanities in the University of Paris 13-Paris Nord from 2004, completing his postdoctoral research Habilitation in 2011. In 2012 he became professor of comparative literature at the Paris-East Créteil University. Since 2022 he has been at the Sorbonne Nouvelle University, also in Paris.

Ferré has become known for his work on J. R. R. Tolkien's writings on the fantasy world of Middle-earth. He has supervised the translation of many of Tolkien's books.

== Reception ==
Thomas Barège, reviewing Dictionnaire Tolkien in Acta Fabula, calls it a fine tool, both synthetic and complete, providing thorough guidance for the reader. He notes that The J. R. R. Tolkien Encyclopedia is in places more detailed, and is less concerned with a fan audience; the two works are in his view largely complementary.

Thomas Fornet-Ponse, reviewing Tolkien: Sur les rivages de la terre du milieu for Hither Shore, writes that Ferré offers a readable and informative introduction to The Lord of the Rings, with material of interest also to experts. Among the topics covered are Tolkien's admitted focus on death and immortality in the novel.

== Books ==
- 2001 Tolkien: sur les rivages de la Terre du Milieu, Christian Bourgois.
- 2004 Tolkien. trente ans après (1973-2003), Christian Bourgois. Includes essays by Tom Shippey, Verlyn Flieger, Thomas Honegger.
- 2009 Tolkien aujourd’hui (ed., with Michael Devaux and Charles Ridoux), Presses Universitaires de Valenciennes.
- 2010 Médiévalisme, modernité du Moyen Âge, L'Harmattan.
- 2012 Dictionnaire Tolkien, CNRS Éditions.
- 2014 Lire J.R.R. Tolkien, Pocket.

As translator

- 2018 Trésors de Tolkien by Catherine McIlwaine, Christian Bourgois.
