= Wizards in Middle-earth =

Group of Wizards (Istari) in J. R. R. Tolkien's legendarium

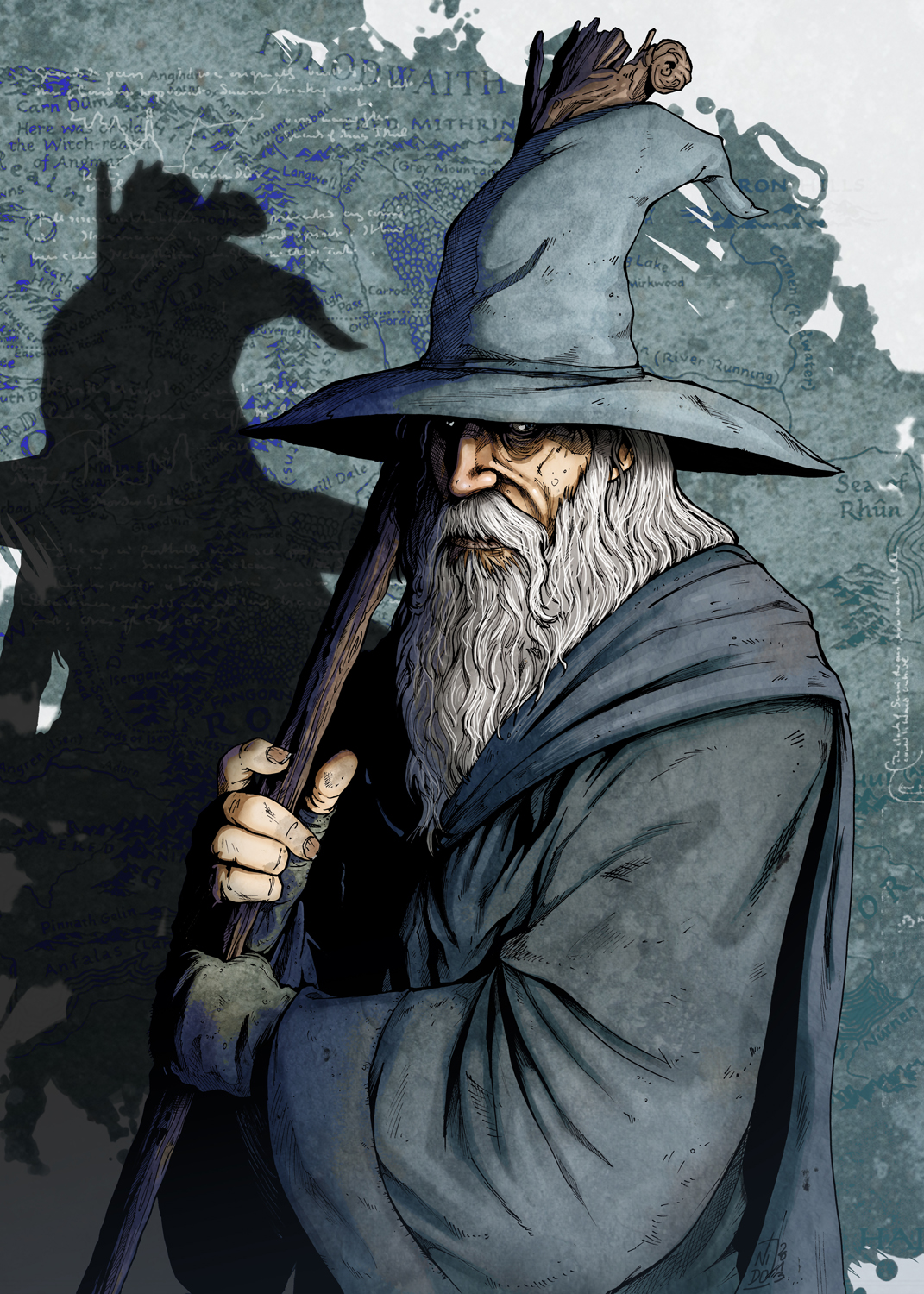
Wizards like Gandalf were immortal Maiar, but took the form of Men.

The Wizards or Istari in J. R. R. Tolkien's fiction were powerful angelic beings, Maiar, who took the physical form and some of the limitations of Men to intervene in the affairs of Middle-earth in the Third Age, after catastrophically violent direct interventions by the Valar, and indeed by the One God, Eru Ilúvatar, in the earlier ages.

Two Wizards, Gandalf the Grey and Saruman the White, largely represent the order, though a third Wizard, Radagast the Brown, appears briefly, more or less as a plot device. Two Blue Wizards are mentioned in passing. Saruman is installed as the head of the White Council, but falls to the temptation of power. He imitates and is to an extent the double of the Dark Lord Sauron, only to become his unwitting servant. Gandalf ceaselessly assists the Company of the Ring in their quest to destroy the Ring and defeat Sauron. He forms the double of Saruman, as Saruman falls and is destroyed, while Gandalf rises and takes Saruman's place as the White Wizard. Gandalf resembles the Norse god Odin in his guise as the Wanderer. He has been described as a figure of Christ.

All three named Wizards appear in Peter Jackson's The Hobbit film trilogy, with Gandalf and Saruman also appearing in Jackson's The Lord of the Rings trilogy. Commentators have stated that they operate more physically and less spiritually than the Wizards in Tolkien's novels, but that this is mostly successful in furthering the drama.

== Maiar ==
The Wizards of Middle-earth are Maiar (singular: Maia): spirits similar to the godlike Valar, but lesser in power. Outwardly resembling Men but possessing much greater physical and mental power, they are called Istari (Quenya for "Wise Ones") by the Elves. They were sent by the Valar to assist the free peoples of Middle-earth in the Third Age to counter the Dark Lord Sauron, a fallen Maia of great power. (Note: Tolkien 1980, "The Istari") During the First Age, they and Melian (another Maia) had also been sent by the Valar to guard the Elves at Cuiviénen. (Note: Tolkien 2021, "Key Dates")

=== Names ===
The first three of these five Wizards were named in The Lord of the Rings as Saruman "man of skill" (supposedly translated from Rohirric, in reality Old English), Gandalf "elf of the staff" (supposedly in the tongue of northern Men, in reality Old Norse), and Radagast "tender of beasts" (possibly Westron). Tolkien never provided non-Elvish names for the other two; their names in Valinor are stated as Alatar and Pallando, and in Middle-earth as Morinehtar and Rómestámo. (Note: Tolkien 1996, pp. 384–385) Each Wizard in the series had robes of a characteristic colour: white for Saruman (the chief and the most powerful of the five), grey for Gandalf, brown for Radagast, and sea-blue for the other two, who are known as the Blue Wizards (Ithryn Luin in Sindarin). Gandalf and Saruman play important roles in The Lord of the Rings, while Radagast appears only briefly, more or less as a single plot device. He innocently helps Saruman to deceive Gandalf, who believes Radagast since he is honest, but fortuitously alerts the eagle Gwaihir to rescue Gandalf. The two Blue Wizards do not feature in the narrative of Tolkien's works; they are said to have journeyed far into the east after their arrival in Middle-earth, and serve as agitators or missionaries in enemy occupied lands. Their ultimate fates are unknown.

=== Servants of the Valar ===
As the Istari were Maiar, each one served a Vala in some way. Saruman was the servant and helper of Aulë, and so learned much in the art of craftsmanship, mechanics, and metal-working, as was seen in the later Third Age. Gandalf was the servant of Manwë or Varda, but was a lover of the Gardens of Lórien, and so knew much of the hopes and dreams of Men and Elves. Radagast, servant of Yavanna, loved the things of nature, both animals and plants. As each of these Istar learned from their Vala, so they acted in Middle-earth.

== Known wizards ==
=== Gandalf ===
Gandalf the Grey is a protagonist in The Hobbit, where he assists Bilbo Baggins on his quest, and in The Lord of the Rings, where he is the leader of the Company of the Ring. Tolkien took the name "Gandalf" from the Old Norse "Catalogue of Dwarves" (Dvergatal) in the Völuspá; its meaning in that language is "staff-elf". Originally called Olórin, he was the wisest of the Maiar and lived in Lórien until the Third Age, when Manwë tasked him to join the Istari and go to Middle-earth to protect its free peoples. He did not want to go as he feared Sauron, but Manwë persuaded him, telling him that his fear of Sauron was why he was a good fit for it.

As a Wizard and the bearer of a Ring of Power, Gandalf has great power, but works mostly by encouraging and inspiring others. He sets out as Gandalf the Grey travelling around Middle Earth nomadically, always focused on his mission to counter Sauron. He is associated with fire, bearing Narya, the Ring of Fire, and he both delights in fireworks to entertain the hobbits of the Shire, and in great need uses fire as a weapon. As one of the Maiar he is an immortal spirit, but being in a physical body on Middle-earth, he can be killed in battle, as he is by the Balrog from Moria. He is sent back to Middle-earth to complete his mission, now as Gandalf the White and leader of the Istari.

Tolkien once described Gandalf as an angel incarnate; later, both he and other scholars likened Gandalf to the Norse god Odin in his "Wanderer" guise. (Note: Carpenter 2023, #107 to Sir Stanley Unwin, 7 December 1946) Others have described Gandalf as a guide-figure who assists the protagonists, comparable to the Cumaean Sibyl who assisted Aeneas in Virgil's The Aeneid, or to Virgil himself in Dante's Inferno; and as a Christ-figure, a prophet.

=== Saruman ===
Saruman the White is leader of the Istari and of the White Council, in The Hobbit and at the outset in The Lord of the Rings. However, he desires Sauron's power for himself and plots to take over Middle-earth by force, remodelling Isengard along the lines of Sauron's Dark Tower, Barad-Dur.

Saruman's character illustrates the corruption of power; his desire for knowledge and order leads to his fall, and he rejects the chance of redemption when it is offered. The name Saruman means "man of skill or cunning" in the Mercian dialect of Anglo-Saxon; he serves as an example of technology and modernity being overthrown by forces more in tune with nature.

=== Radagast ===
Radagast the Brown is mentioned in The Hobbit and in The Lord of the Rings. His role is so slight that it has been described as a plot device. He played a more significant part in Peter Jackson's The Hobbit film series. Some aspects of his characterisation were invented for the films, but the core elements of his character, namely communing with animals, skill with herbs, and shamanistic ability to change his shape and colours, are as described by Tolkien. Unusually among Middle-earth names, Radagast is Slavic, the name of a god.

=== Blue Wizards: Alatar and Pallando ===
The two remaining Istari, the Blue Wizards (Ithryn Luin), are never named in The Lord of the Rings or The Hobbit. Their names, Alatar and Pallando, appear only in Tolkien's posthumously published writings. In the essay "The Istari", edited by Christopher Tolkien in Unfinished Tales, the Wizards are chosen in a council of the Valar. Alatar is sent by Oromë, the hunter-Vala, and Alatar in turn takes Pallando with him as his friend. The Wizards were said to be little known in the West of Middle-earth. Accounts state that they went into the East, and that they never returned.

Tolkien was unsure about their purpose and fate. In a 1958 letter he wrote that he knew nothing clear about "the other two". He suggested that they went with Saruman to the East, and added: "I fear they failed, as Saruman did". He speculated that they might have founded secret cults and traditions of "magic" that lasted after the fall of Sauron. (Note: Carpenter 2023, #211 to Rhona Beare, 14 October 1958)

In one of his last writings on the subject, published in The Peoples of Middle-earth, Tolkien gave a more hopeful and different account. Here the Blue Wizards come to Middle-earth much earlier, in the Second Age, at about the same time as Glorfindel. They are given new names, Morinehtar ("Darkness-slayer") and Rómestámo ("East-helper"). Their task is to work against Sauron in the East and South, which he dominated. They help those who rebelled against him and cause division and disarray among his followers. Tolkien suggested that they may have done much to weaken the forces of the East, which would otherwise have overwhelmed the West. Their ultimate fates are not recorded.

The Blue Wizards' lack of a written story has invited speculation by readers and adapters. In the second season of The Lord of the Rings: The Rings of Power, Ciarán Hinds plays "the Dark Wizard", who rules in Rhûn. In the third episode of the third season, a vision from the Secret Fire tells Gandalf that the Dark Wizard is Pallando. Pallando had grown hungry for power, and he betrayed and murdered his companion Alatar, an act that laid waste to Rhûn. Alatar's murder is an invention of the series and has no basis in Tolkien's writings.

== Analysis ==
Tolkien stated that the main temptation facing the Wizards, and the one that brought down Saruman, was impatience. It led to a desire to force others to do good, and from there to a simple desire for power. (Note: Carpenter 2023, #181 to Michael Straight, January or February 1956)

The Tolkien scholar Marjorie Burns writes that while Saruman is an "imitative and lesser" double of Sauron, reinforcing the Dark Lord's character type, he is also a contrasting double of Gandalf, who becomes Saruman as he "should have been", after Saruman fails in his original purpose.

Charles Nelson writes that although evil is personified in Sauron and his creatures such as Balrogs, along with Shelob and other "nameless things" deep below the mountains, evil threatens the characters from within, and the moral failures of those such as Saruman, Boromir, and Denethor endanger the world. Nelson notes that in a letter, Tolkien stated that "Myth and fairy-story must, as all art, reflect and contain in solution elements of moral and religious truth (or error), but not explicit, not in the known form of the primary 'real' world." (Note: Carpenter 2023, #131 to Milton Waldman, late 1951) Each race exemplifies one of the Seven Deadly Sins, for instance Dwarves embody greed, Men pride, Elves envy. In this scheme, the Wizards represent the angels sent by God, or as Tolkien wrote "Emissaries (in the terms of this tale from the Far West beyond the Sea)". (Note: Carpenter 2023, #144 to Naomi Mitchison, 25 April 1954) Pride is the greatest of the Sins, and affects the Wizards who take the shape of Men. Saruman, like Lucifer, is overwhelmed by pride and vainglory, just as Denethor is. Nelson states that Saruman's argument for the need for power "definitely echoes" Hitler's rationalisations for the Second World War, despite Tolkien's claims to the contrary. (Note: Tolkien 1954a, Foreword to the Second Edition)

The scholar of humanities Patrick Curry rebuts the "common criticism" of Tolkien, levelled by literary critics such as the scholar of English literature Catherine Stimpson, that his characters are naively either good or evil. Curry writes that far from being "seemingly incorruptible" as Stimpson alleges, evil emerges among the Wizards.

William Senior contrasts Tolkien's Wizards as angelic emissaries with those in Stephen R. Donaldson's The Chronicles of Thomas Covenant (published 1977–2013), who are simply human. In Senior's view, where Tolkien used myth and a medieval hierarchy of orders of being, with Wizards higher than Elves who are higher than Men, Donaldson's Lords are "wholly human" and "function democratically".

== Adaptations ==
Christopher Lee played Saruman in The Lord of the Rings and The Hobbit as "a powerfully haunted and vindictive figure".

Two Wizards appear in Peter Jackson's The Lord of the Rings film trilogy: Saruman, portrayed by Christopher Lee; and Gandalf, portrayed by Ian McKellen. Jackson included all three named wizards in The Hobbit film trilogies, with Lee and McKellen reprising their roles and Sylvester McCoy portraying Radagast.

The critic Brian D. Walter writes that the films seek to make Gandalf a powerful character without having him take over the Fellowship's strategy and action. As in the novels, Gandalf is "an oddly ambivalent presence, extraordinarily powerful and authoritative ..., but also a stranger, the only one of the Istari who never settles down". On screen, Gandalf is necessarily "less remote, less liminal, more bodily present", less like an angelic spirit than in Tolkien, but in Walter's view this benefits the films' dramatic tension and helps to bring out many other characters. Still, he appears more as a magical than a heroic figure, for example when the Fellowship is attacked by wargs in Hollin, where he uses words and a firebrand rather than drawing his sword Glamdring. Brian Rosebury calls the film Saruman "incipiently Shakespearean ... [with] the potential to rise to a kind of tragic dignity"; he considers that Lee attains a suitable presence as "a powerfully haunted and vindictive figure, if less self-deluding than Tolkien's", even if the film version of the verbal confrontation with Gandalf fails to rise to the same level.

Kristin Thompson notes that the Wizards' staffs are more elaborate in the films; their tips are "more convoluted" and can hold a crystal, which can be used to produce light. Rosebury considers the staff-battle between Gandalf and Saruman in Orthanc "absurd", breaking the spell of the film in The Fellowship of the Ring, and coming "uncomfortably close" to the light-sabre fights in Star Wars.

In Amazon's series The Lord of the Rings: The Rings of Power, Daniel Weyman portrays "the Stranger", a Wizard who falls from the sky in a meteorite. In the show's second season, Ciarán Hinds portrays "the Dark Wizard" in the land of Rhûn. On the show's second season finale, the Stranger is confirmed as a younger version of Gandalf, while the series creators J. D. Payne and Patrick McKay have indicated that the Dark Wizard is one of the other five, but extremely unlikely to be Saruman.
