= Nick Groom =

British professor (born 1966)

Nick Groom FRSA
- Born: 1966 (age 59–60)

Academic background
- Education: Bedford Modern School
- Alma mater: Hertford College, Oxford
- Thesis: Thomas Percy’s Reliques of Ancient English Poetry: Its Context, Presentation, and Reception

Academic work
- Discipline: English Literature
- Sub-discipline: Gothic literature; J. R. R. Tolkien; critical theory; historical criticism
- Institutions: University of Exeter; University of Bristol; University of Macau

Nicholas Michael Groom (born 1966) is Professor of English Literature at the University of Macau, an author on subjects ranging from the history of the Union Jack, to Thomas Chatterton, has edited several books and regularly appears on television, radio and at literary festivals as an authority on English Literature, seasonal customs, J. R. R. Tolkien, the 'Gothic' and 'British' and 'English' identities. Due to his extensive work on the Goth subculture, especially on the history of vampires, he has become known as the 'Prof of Goth' in the media and has written several articles on the Goth scene, including essays on the singer, Nick Cave.

== Early years ==
Nick Groom was born in 1966 and educated at Bedford Modern School and Hertford College, Oxford where he graduated with first class honours in 1988. He was awarded a DPhil (Oxon) in 1994 with his doctoral thesis, Thomas Percy’s Reliques of Ancient English Poetry: Its Context, Presentation, and Reception.

== Career ==
Groom became a lecturer in English at the University of Exeter in 1994, a Senior Lecturer in Post-Medieval Literature at the University of Bristol in 2000 and Reader in English Literature at the University of Bristol in 2003. In April 2000 he was a Visiting Associate Professor at Stanford University following which he was made Visiting Professor at the University of Chicago in October 2001.

In 2007 Groom was made Professor of English Literature at the University of Exeter and established the Exeter Centre for Literatures of Identity, Place and Sustainability in 2008. He is on the management board of the Atlantic Archipelagos Research Consortium and the Wellcome Centre for the Cultures and Environments of Health.

Groom teaches courses on the Gothic. He also used to teach what was then the only undergraduate course in Britain on the works of J. R. R. Tolkien.

Groom’s research has ‘largely focussed on three areas; cultural formation and authenticity, including attribution studies (work on forgery and, specifically, Chatterton); national identity (Englishness and Britishness, including the Gothic); and historicist popular culture and folklore (seasons and saints’ days)’. He has recently concentrated particularly on Gothic literature. His book The Seasons was shortlisted for the Katherine Briggs Folklore Prize and was runner-up for BBC Countryfile Book of the Year 2014.

Groom wrote an essay on The Young Ones for The Cassell Book of Great British Comedy and in 2008 he nominated Rik Mayall for an Honorary Degree at the University of Exeter. Following Mayall’s death in 2014, Groom was regularly interviewed to comment on Mayall’s unique contribution to English comedy.

Groom is a critically acclaimed author, has edited several books including four Gothic novels for Oxford University Press and a twelve volume edition of The Plays of William Shakespeare (London and Bristol: Routledge/Thoemmes Press, 1995), has contributed over seventy chapters and articles to edited collections and academic journals and has regularly reviewed books for The Financial Times, Times Higher Education and The Independent. He is currently a contributor to The Times Literary Supplement. His online essay "Let's discuss over country supper soon" was used for 'Creating a Countryside', the 2017 exhibition at Compton Verney Art Gallery and Park.

== Personal life ==
Groom lives on Dartmoor. He has a flock of sheep and is actively involved in local arts and music.

== Selected publications ==
=== Books ===
- The Making of Percy's Reliques. Oxford: Oxford University Press. 1999. ISBN 978-0-19-818459-1.
- Thomas Chatterton and Romantic culture. Published by London: Macmillan; New York: St Martin’s Press, 1999
- Introducing Shakespeare (Cambridge: Icon, 2001), with illustrations by Piero. 176pp.
- The Forger’s Shadow: How Forgery Changed the Course of Literature (London: Picador, 2002; paperback, 2003). 350pp.
- The Union Jack: The Story of the British Flag (London: Atlantic, 2006; paperback, 2007). xxii + 398pp
- The Gothic: A Very Short Introduction (Oxford: Oxford University Press, 2012). Xviii + 164pp.
- The Seasons: An Elegy for the Passing of the Year (London: Atlantic, 2013), 400pp.
- Anniversary edition of Horace Walpole, The Castle of Otranto (Oxford University Press, 2014)
- Edition of Matthew Lewis, The Monk (Oxford University Press, 2017)
- Edition of Ann Radcliffe, The Italian (Oxford University Press, 2017)
- Anniversary edition of Mary Shelley, Frankenstein (Oxford University Press, 2018)
- The Vampire: A New History (Yale University Press, 2018)
- Twenty-First Century Tolkien: What Middle-earth Means to Us Today (Atlantic Books, 2022)

=== Critical studies, reviews and biography ===
- McDonagh, Melanie (4 January 2014). "Eat, drink and be merry ...". Books. The Spectator. 324 (9671): 20–21. Review of The seasons.
