= Isengard =

Fortress in JRR Tolkien's Middle-earth

- J. R. R. Tolkien's legendarium location
- The Orcs of Isengard bore upon their shields the symbol of the White Hand on a black field. (Note: Tolkien 1954, book 3 ch. 1, "The Departure of Boromir": "Upon their shields they bore a strange device: a small white hand in the centre of a black field; on the front of their iron helms was set an S-rune, wrought of some white metal")
- First appearance: The Fellowship of the Ring

In-universe information
- Other names: Angrenost, Nan Curunír, Wizard's Vale
- Type: Fortress built to guard the Gap of Rohan
- Ruled by: Saruman
- Locations: The Tower of Orthanc, the Ring of Isengard, the pillar of the White Hand, the Isen
- Location: Calenardhon
- Lifespan: Second Age – Fourth Age
- Founder: Gondor, during the time of Isildur

In J. R. R. Tolkien's fantasy writings, Isengard (/ˈaɪzənɡɑːrd/) is a large fortress in Nan Curunír, the Wizard's Vale, in the western part of Middle-earth. In the fantasy world, the name of the fortress is described as a translation of Angrenost, a word in Tolkien's elvish language, Sindarin, a compound of two Old English words: īsen and ġeard, meaning "enclosure of iron".

In The Lord of the Rings, Orthanc, the tower at the centre of Isengard, is the home of the Wizard Saruman. He had been ensnared by the Dark Lord Sauron through the tower's palantír, a far-seeing crystal ball able to communicate with others like it. Saruman had bred Orcs in Isengard, in imitation of Sauron's forces, to be ready for war with Rohan. The Orcs cut down many trees in the forest of the Ents, who retaliate by destroying Isengard while the army of Orcs is away attacking Rohan at Helm's Deep. However, the Ents are unable to harm the tower of Orthanc. Saruman, isolated in the tower, is visited by members of the Fellowship of the Ring; his staff is broken by the Wizard Gandalf.

Isengard has been described by Tolkien scholars as an industrial hell, and as an illustration of the homogeneity of evil, in contrast to the evident diversity of the free societies of Middle-earth, including those of the Elves, Dwarves, and Gondor. Others have compared it to Vichy France, and its proposed governor on behalf of Mordor, the Mouth of Sauron, to a traitorous Quisling.

== Fictional history ==
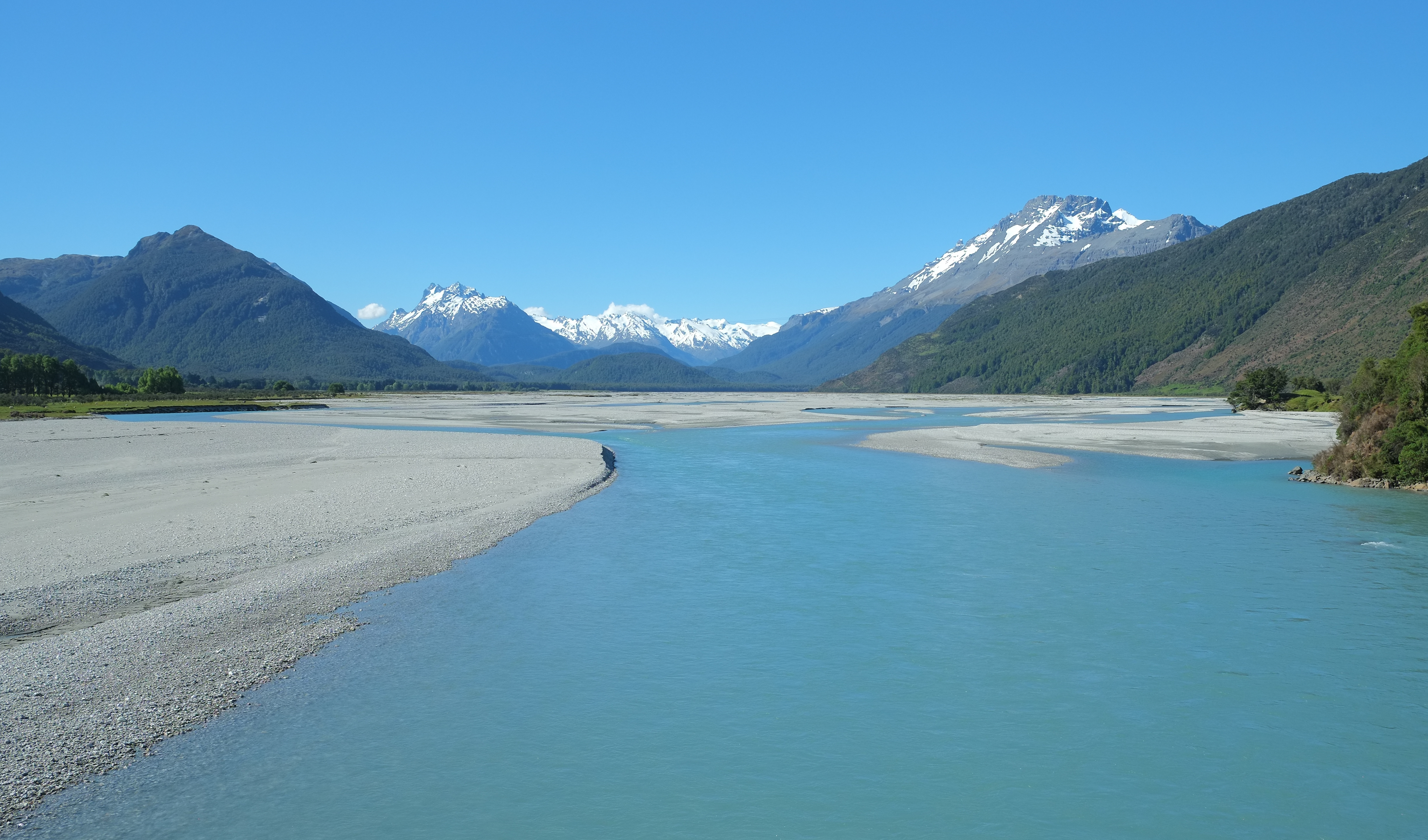
The natural landscape of Glenorchy, New Zealand, represented the setting of Isengard in Peter Jackson's The Lord of the Rings film trilogy.

=== Construction ===
The Númenóreans in exile built Isengard in the Second Age as a walled circular enclosure, with the tower of Orthanc at its centre. It lay just outside the north-western corner of Rohan, guarding the Fords of Isen from enemy incursions into Calenardhon together with the fortress of Aglarond to its south. (Note: Tolkien 1954, book 3 ch. 8, "The Road to Isengard")

The river Isen or Angren began on Methedras, the southernmost peak of the Misty Mountains. Methedras stood behind Isengard, forming its northern wall. The rest of its perimeter consisted of a large wall, the Ring of Isengard, breached only by the inflow of the river at the north-east through a portcullis, and the gate of Isengard at the south, on the river. For most of its history, Isengard was a green and pleasant place, with many fruiting trees.

Orthanc was built towards the end of the Second Age by men of Gondor from four many-sided columns of rock joined by an unknown process and then hardened. No known weapon could harm it. (Note: Tolkien 1954, book 3 ch. 9, "Flotsam and Jetsam") Orthanc rose to more than 500 feet (152 metres) above the plain of Isengard, and ended in four sharp peaks. Its only entrance was at the top of a high stair, and above that was a small window and balcony. (Note: Tolkien 1954, book 3 ch. 10, "The Voice of Saruman") It housed one of the palantírs of the South Kingdom, and was guarded by a warden. (Note: Tolkien 1955, Appendix A, II "The House of Eorl")

=== Depopulation ===
In the Third Age the land around Isengard (Calenardhon) became depopulated, and the last warden of Orthanc was recalled to Minas Tirith. Isengard remained guarded by a small company, led by a hereditary captain. Contact with Minas Tirith gradually decreased and eventually ceased altogether. When Cirion, Steward of Gondor, gave Calenardhon to the Éothéod, becoming the land of Rohan, Isengard was the sole fortress retained by Gondor north of the Ered Nimrais. The small guard intermarried much with the Dunlendings, until the fortress became Dunlending in all but name. The tower of Orthanc however remained locked and inaccessible to the Dunlendings, as the Steward of Gondor alone held the keys in Minas Tirith. The line of hereditary Captains died out, and during the rule of Rohan's King Déor, Isengard became openly hostile to the Rohirrim. Using Isengard as their base, the Dunlendings continually raided Rohan until during the rule of Helm Hammerhand, the Dunlending lord Freca and his son Wulf nearly managed to destroy the Rohirrim. The Rohirrim fought off the invaders and blockaded Isengard, eventually taking it.

Gondor did not wish to relinquish its claim to the tower, but lacked the strength to garrison it. A solution presented itself to the Steward of Gondor, Beren, as the Wizard Saruman suddenly reappeared from the East, offering to guard Isengard. Beren gladly gave him the keys to Orthanc. At first he resided there as Warden of the Tower on behalf of Gondor. The valley became known as Nan Curunír, the "Wizard's Vale". On Sauron's return to Mordor, Saruman asserted himself as Lord of Isengard.

=== War of the Ring ===
During the War of the Ring, Saruman prepares for war against Rohan, defiling the valley of Isengard with deep pits where he breeds large numbers of powerful warrior Orcs, Uruk-hai, smithing weapons in underground workshops full of machinery, and felling the valley's trees.

The Orcs of Isengard bear upon their shields the symbol of a White Hand on a black field, and on their helmets an S-rune to signify Saruman. A carved and painted White Hand of stone is set on a black pillar outside the gates of Isengard. (Note: Tolkien 1954, book 3 ch. 2, "The Riders of Rohan": "Great Orcs, who also bore the White Hand of Isengard")

Treebeard, leader of the Ents, seeing that the Orcs would destroy his forest of Fangorn, leads an army of Ents and Huorns to Isengard, destroys it, and floods it, leaving Saruman isolated in the tower of Orthanc. The hobbits Merry Brandybuck and Pippin Took, as the new "doorwardens", receive Théoden King of Rohan, Aragorn and the wizard Gandalf at the wrecked gates. Gandalf speaks with Saruman and breaks his staff. Grima Wormtongue throws the Orthanc palantír, a stone of seeing, at the party; both Pippin and Aragorn later use it, seeing and deceiving Sauron as to the Fellowship's intentions.

Saruman is locked in Orthanc and guarded by Treebeard, who later sets him free. Saruman hands the tower's keys over to Treebeard, and takes Gríma with him. Saruman exploits Treebeard's unwillingness to see any living thing caged, most likely using his power with words. (Note: Tolkien 1955, book 6 ch. 6, "Many Partings")

=== Restoration ===
During the Fourth Age, when Aragorn has been crowned as King Elessar ("Elfstone"), he visits Orthanc, finding there heirlooms of Isildur, among them the Elendilmir, the Star of Arnor, and the small gold case on a chain that Isildur had used to carry the One Ring, evidence that Saruman had found and apparently destroyed Isildur's remains. (Note: Tolkien 1980, Part 3, ch. 1 "Disaster of the Gladden Fields") Isengard is restored, and the entire valley granted to the Ents. The Ents name the new forest the Treegarth of Orthanc. Orthanc becomes again a tower of the Reunited Kingdom of Gondor and Arnor.

== Origins ==
=== Etymology ===
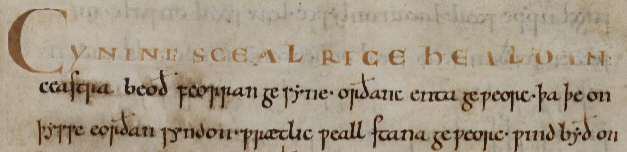
The phrase Orthanc enta geweorc, on the second line of the Old English Maxims II manuscript, seems to have inspired Tolkien

"Isengard" is from Old English īsen, "iron" and geard, "court, enclosure". The names, supposedly given by the Rohirrim, for Orthanc, the cunningly-built tower of Isengard, and for the Ents, the tree-giants of Fangorn forest who eventually destroy Isengard, are similarly in reality from Old English. Both are found in the poem The Ruin, which describes the ancient Roman ruins as orþanc, "skilful work", and enta geweorc, "the work of giants" and in Maxims II. Clark Hall gives the meanings of the noun orþanc as "intelligence, understanding, mind; cleverness, skill; skilful work, mechanical art", and as an adjective "ingenious, skilful". The Tolkien scholar Tom Shippey suggests that Tolkien may have chosen to read the phrase also as "Orthanc, the Ent's fortress".

The historian Casper Clemmensen suggests that Tolkien was inspired by Norse mythology and the Danish landscape, with the manor house Isgård ("Ice manor") on the Djursland peninsula as the inspiration for Isengard.

=== Bilingual pun ===
The name of the tower of Orthanc is unique in that it is explicitly stated to be a bilingual pun in The Two Towers: Tolkien gives the two meanings as "Mount Fang" in Elvish (Sindarin), and "Cunning Mind" in the "language of the Mark of Old", Rohirric. However, "Orthanc" genuinely means "Cunning Mind" in the language Tolkien had used to represent Rohirric, Old English: he had pretended that he had translated Rohirric into Old English, and the related Westron into modern English. The unlikely coincidence of homonyms and synonyms makes Tolkien's claim about Rohirric look like a mistake.

In The Two Towers, Tolkien said Orthanc had meanings in Sindarin and Rohirric; but it is also a synonym and homonym in Old English, making Tolkien's claim look like a mistake.

=== Illustrations ===
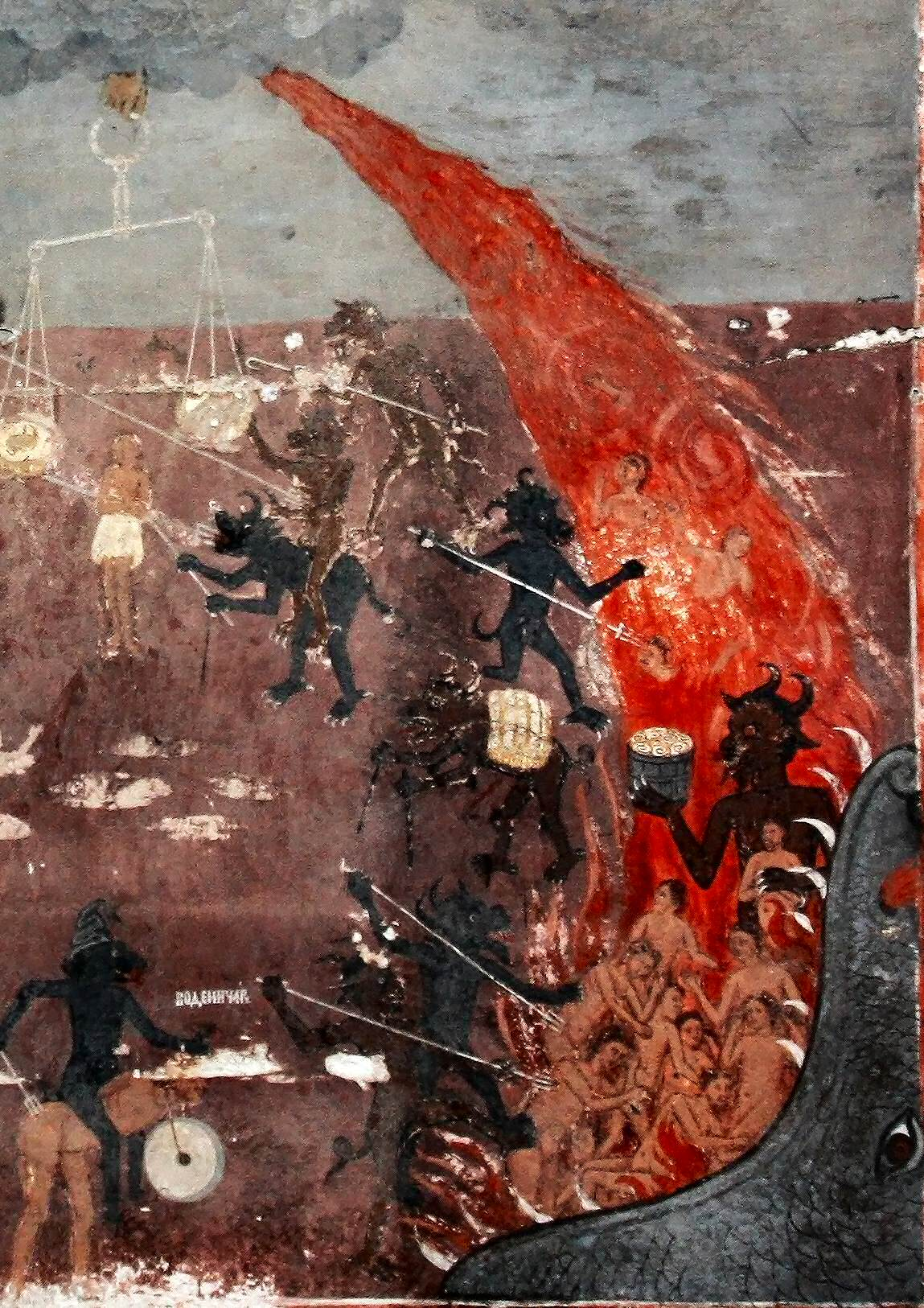
Isengard: an "industrial hell", as Tolkien wrote "tunneled .. dark .. deep .. graveyard of unquiet dead .. furnaces". Medieval fresco of hell, St Nicholas in Raduil, Bulgaria

Tolkien made detailed sketches of Isengard and Orthanc, published in J. R. R. Tolkien: Artist and Illustrator, as he developed his conception of them.

== Analysis ==
=== Industrial hell ===
The scholar of English literature Charles A. Huttar describes Isengard as an "industrial hell". He quotes Tolkien's description of Isengard, supplying his own emphasis on Tolkien's words: "tunneled .. circle .. dark .. deep .. graveyard of unquiet dead .. the ground trembled .. treasuries .. furnaces .. iron wheels .. endlessly .. lit from beneath .. venomous". (Note: Tolkien 1954, book 3, ch. 8 "The Road to Isengard") Huttar comments: "The imagery is familiar, its connotations plain. This is yet another hell [after Moria and Mordor]". All the same, he writes, the tower of Orthanc cannot but be admired, with its "marvellous shape" and wonderful, ancient strength; he supposes that for Tolkien, technology could neither be "wholeheartedly embraced nor utterly rejected".

Shippey, discussing Saruman's character, notes several facts about him: Treebeard's comment that "He has a mind of metal and wheels"; that Isengard means "Irontown"; that the Ents are attacked in Isengard with "a kind of napalm [or] perhaps ... [given] Tolkien's own experience, a Flammenwerfer". Shippey concludes that Saruman had been led into "wanton pollution ... by something corrupting in the love of machines", which he connects to "Tolkien's own childhood image of industrial ugliness ... Sarehole Mill, with its literally bone-grinding owner".

David D. Oberhelman, writing in the J.R.R. Tolkien Encyclopedia, states, following Anne C. Petty, that there are multiple "industrial 'hells' in Tolkien's work, such as Saruman's blighted, machine-ridden Isengard". He notes that its prototype was the fallen Vala Morgoth's subterranean fortress, Angband, whose name meant "Iron Prison" or "Hell of Iron".

=== Vichy status ===
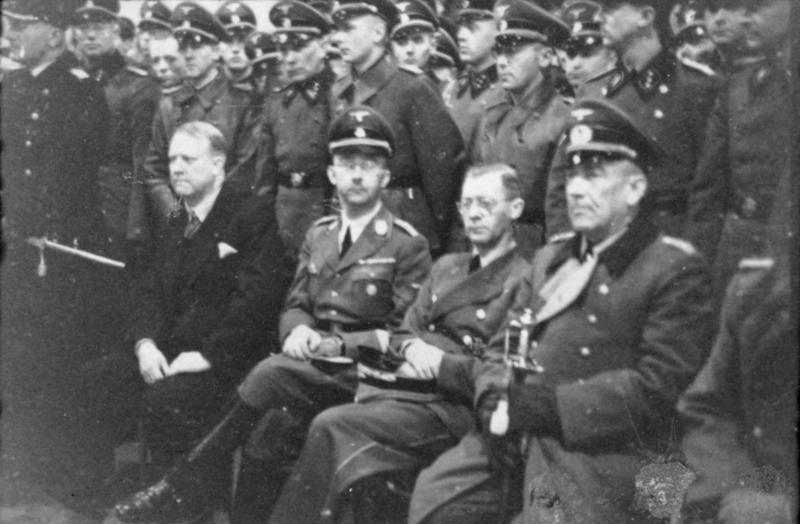
The Mouth of Sauron's plan to rule the West of Middle-earth from Isengard has been compared to Vidkun Quisling's role as a puppet of the Nazi regime in Norway. Photo shows Quisling (front, left) with Heinrich Himmler and other Nazis in 1941.

Isengard is the promised reward for the nameless "Mouth of Sauron", as soon as Gondor and its allies had surrendered. In his words in front of the Black Gate: (Note: Tolkien 1954, book 3, ch. 10 "The Black Gate Opens")

West of the Anduin as far as the Misty Mountains and the Gap of Rohan shall be tributary to Mordor, and men there shall bear no weapons, but shall have leave to govern their own affairs. But they shall help to rebuild Isengard which they have wantonly destroyed, and that shall be Sauron's, and there his lieutenant shall dwell: not Saruman, but one more worthy of trust.

Shippey compares Sauron's offer to the Vichy treaty imposed on France after its surrender in 1940: "sovereignty over the disputed territory of Ithilien [East of the Anduin], the Alsace-Lorraine of Middle-earth, is to be transferred", and in the lands to the West "a demilitarized zone, with what one can only call Vichy status, which will pay war-reparations, and be governed [from Isengard] by what one can again only call a Quisling".

=== Homogeneity of evil ===
The model of Orthanc, the tower at the centre of Isengard, used in Peter Jackson's The Two Towers was based on Alan Lee's illustration

During the War of the Ring, Isengard was controlled by Saruman until the fortress's destruction, but Saruman had become "more like Sauron than he realizes", like him believing in "supremacy through absolute power", and unintentionally a pupil of Sauron, having against Elrond's advice "stud[ied] too deeply the arts of the enemy". The Tolkien scholars Wayne Hammond and Christina Scull note that the palantír in Orthanc had formed what Gandalf called "some link between Isengard and Mordor, which I have not yet fathomed": the link was that Sauron had used the stone to take control of Saruman, and through him his forces of Orcs. In The Two Towers, Tolkien himself described Saruman's Isengard as "only a little copy, a child's model or a slave's flattery ... [of Sauron's] vast fortress, armoury, prison, furnace of great power, Barad-dûr". The Tolkien scholar Brian Rosebury writes that Tolkien was making the point that whereas good government in free societies like those of Gondor, the Dwarves, the Elves, the Drúedain, and the Shire leads to diversity, "evil tends to homogeneity".

== Adaptations ==
In Peter Jackson's films of The Lord of the Rings, Isengard and Orthanc were based on Alan Lee's illustrations and modelled under the direction of Richard Taylor; Lee worked as the project's conceptual artist in New Zealand throughout the making of the film trilogy. The very large miniature or "bigature" of Orthanc was cast and then carved from micro-crystalline wax by Wētā Workshop to resemble obsidian, black volcanic glass; it was made at 1/35 scale, standing some 15 feet (4.6 m) high. The model of the walled circular area of Isengard was more than 65 feet (20 m) wide. In post-production, the long shots of the Orthanc model were combined, using chroma keying, with panoramic views of the Mount Earnslaw / Pikirakatahi region and Mount Aspiring National Park near Queenstown and Glenorchy, New Zealand.

== Sources ==
- Berube, Pierre H. (2018). "Bilingual Puns in 'The Lord of the Rings'". Mythlore. 37 (1). Article 15. Archived from the original on 23 July 2024.
- Brodie, Ian (2002). The Lord of the Rings Location Guidebook. Auckland: HarperCollins Publishers. ISBN 978-1-86950-452-6 – via Internet Archive.
- Clark Hall, J. R. (2002) [1894]. A Concise Anglo-Saxon Dictionary (4th ed.). University of Toronto Press.
- Cusack, Carole M. (2011). The Sacred Tree: Ancient and Medieval Manifestations. Cambridge Scholars Publishing. ISBN 978-1-4438-3031-7.
- * Fimi, Dimitra (2010) [2008]. Tolkien, Race, and Cultural History: From Fairies to Hobbits. Palgrave Macmillan. ISBN 978-0-230-21951-9. OCLC 222251097.
- Libran Moreno, Miryam (2013) [2007]. "Elendilmir". In Drout, Michael D. C. (ed.). The J. R. R. Tolkien Encyclopedia: Scholarship and Critical Assessment. Routledge. pp. 146–147. ISBN 978-0-415-86511-1.
- Hammond, Wayne G.; Scull, Christina (1995). J. R. R. Tolkien: Artist and Illustrator. HarperCollins. ISBN 0-261-10322-9.
- Hammond, Wayne G.; Scull, Christina (2005). The Lord of the Rings: A Reader's Companion. HarperCollins. ISBN 978-0-00-720907-1.
- Huttar, Charles A. (1975). "Hell and The City: Tolkien and the Traditions of Western Literature". In Lobdell, Jared (ed.). A Tolkien Compass. Open Court. ISBN 978-0-8754-8303-0.
- Kocher, Paul (1974) [1972]. Master of Middle-earth: The Achievement of J.R.R. Tolkien. Penguin Books. ISBN 978-0-14-003877-4.
- Oberhelman, David D. (2013) [2007]. "Angband". In Drout, Michael D. C. (ed.). The J. R. R. Tolkien Encyclopedia: Scholarship and Critical Assessment. Routledge. pp. 17–18. ISBN 978-0-415-86511-1.
- Petty, Anne C. (2003). Tolkien in the Land of Heroes: Discovering the Human Spirit. Cold Spring Press. ISBN 978-1892975997.
- Rosebury, Brian (2016). Tolkien: A Critical Assessment. Springer. ISBN 978-1-349-22133-2.
- Shippey, Tom (2001). J. R. R. Tolkien: Author of the Century. Houghton Mifflin. ISBN 978-0-618-12764-1.
- Shippey, Tom (2005) [1982]. The Road to Middle-Earth: How J. R. R. Tolkien Created a New Mythology (Third ed.). HarperCollins. ISBN 978-0-261-10275-0.
- Svitil, Torene (2007). So You Want to Work in Animation & Special Effects?. Enslow Publishers. ISBN 978-0-7660-2737-4.
- Tolkien, J. R. R. (1954). The Two Towers. The Lord of the Rings. Boston: Houghton Mifflin. OCLC 1042159111.
- Tolkien, J. R. R. (1955). The Return of the King. The Lord of the Rings. Boston: Houghton Mifflin. OCLC 519647821.
- Tolkien, J. R. R. (1980). Christopher Tolkien (ed.). Unfinished Tales. Boston: Houghton Mifflin. ISBN 978-0-395-29917-3.
