= The History of Middle-earth =

Book series on Tolkien's writings

- The front cover of Volume 9
- Editor: Christopher Tolkien
- Author: J. R. R. Tolkien
- Language: English
- Genre: High fantasy
- Publisher: George Allen & Unwin (UK); Houghton Mifflin (US)
- Publication date: 1983 to 1996
- Publication place: United Kingdom
- Media type: Print (hardback and paperback)
- Pages: 12 volumes
- Preceded by: Unfinished Tales
- Followed by: The Children of Húrin

The History of Middle-earth is a 12-volume series of books published between 1983 and 1996 by George Allen & Unwin in the UK and by Houghton Mifflin in the US. They collect and analyse much of J. R. R. Tolkien's legendarium, compiled and edited by his son Christopher Tolkien. The series shows the development over time of Tolkien's conception of Middle-earth as a fictional place with its own peoples, languages, and history, from his earliest notions of "a mythology for England" through to the development of the stories that make up The Silmarillion and The Lord of the Rings. It is not a "history of Middle-earth" in the sense of being a chronicle of events in Middle-earth written from an in-universe perspective; it is instead an out-of-universe history of Tolkien's creative process. In 2000, the twelve volumes were republished in three limited edition omnibus volumes.

Scholars including Gergely Nagy and Vincent Ferré have commented that Tolkien had always wanted to create a mythology, but believed that such a thing should have passed through many hands and be framed by annotations and edits of different kinds. When Christopher Tolkien, a philologist like his father, edited the History, he created an editorial frame, inadvertently reinforcing the mythopoeic effect that his father wanted.

== Context ==
J. R. R. Tolkien (1892–1973) was a professor of English language at the University of Leeds, and then at the University of Oxford. He specialised in philology, especially Old English works such as Beowulf. He is best known for his novels The Hobbit and The Lord of the Rings, but he spent much of his time working on his legendarium. This was not published in his lifetime; he left a large mass of unsorted manuscripts for his literary executor, his son Christopher Tolkien, to work on. Christopher, a philologist like his father, became lecturer in English language at New College, Oxford in 1963. After his father's death, he constructed a short summary of the legendarium stories, published in 1977 as The Silmarillion; he followed this in 1978 with Unfinished Tales, a selection from the later legendarium.

== Structure and contents ==
The History of Middle-earth documents J. R. R. Tolkien's legendarium, an extensive set of drafts on many aspects of Middle-earth, which Tolkien wrote in stages throughout his life. The History, edited by his son Christopher, was published in 12 volumes by George Allen & Unwin in the UK and by Houghton Mifflin in the US between 1983 and 1996 as follows:

The History of Middle-earth
Volumes, grouped	Written	Contents	Tolkien's life
1. The Book of Lost Tales, Part I (1983); 2. The Book of Lost Tales, Part II (1984)	1914–1920	1: Cottage of Lost Play, Music of the Ainur, Tale of the Sun and Moon, Hiding of Valinor. 2: Tale of Tinuviel, Turambar, Fall of Gondolin, Tale of Eärendel	First World War; Oxford English Dictionary; University of Leeds
3. The Lays of Beleriand (1985); 4. The Shaping of Middle-earth (1986)	1920–1935	Early history of legendarium, in multiple versions. Lay of the Children of Húrin, Lay of Leithian, earliest Silmarillion, Quenta Noldorinwa, Ambarkanta, earliest Annals	University of Oxford
5. The Lost Road and Other Writings (1987)	1936–1937	Fall of Númenor, The Lost Road, Ainulindalë, Quenta Silmarillion, Later Annals	The Hobbit written and published
The History of The Lord of the Rings: 6. [1] The Return of the Shadow (1988); 7. [2] The Treason of Isengard (1989); 8. [3] The War of the Ring (1990); 9. [4] Sauron Defeated (1992)	1938–1948	The Lord of the Rings; in 9. also Númenor story as The Notion Club Papers.	Second World War; constructing The Lord of the Rings
The Later Silmarillion: 10. [1] Morgoth's Ring (1993); 11. [2] The War of the Jewels (1994)	1948–1959	Ainulindalë, later Quenta Silmarillion, Athrabeth, Annals of Beleriand, Annals of Aman	The Lord of the Rings published
12. The Peoples of Middle-earth (1996)	1960–1973	Prologue and Appendices to The Lord of the Rings; Unfinished Tales; other late writings	retirement

A combined index was published six years after the series was completed as The History of Middle-earth: Index (2002).

A shorter version of volume 9, omitting material not related to The Lord of the Rings, was published as The End of the Third Age; this is however usually sold as a boxed set along with volumes 6, 7 and 8 as The History of the Lord of the Rings.

Christopher Tolkien made the decision not to include any material related to The Hobbit in The History of Middle-earth. His reasons for this were that it had not been intended to form part of the mythology, was a children's story, and had originally not been set in Middle-earth; it was revised during the writing of The Lord of the Rings. The History of The Hobbit was published separately, in two volumes, in 2007 and was edited by John D. Rateliff.

== Reception ==
Charles Noad, reviewing The War of the Jewels in Mallorn, comments that the 12-volume History had done something that a putative single-volume edition of The Silmarillion (such as Tolkien had hoped to publish) with embedded commentary could not have achieved: it had changed people's perspective on Tolkien's Middle-earth writings, from being centred on The Lord of the Rings to what it had always been in Tolkien's mind: Silmarillion-centred.

Reviewing The Peoples of Middle-earth, Noad adds that "The whole series of The History of Middle-earth is a tremendous achievement and makes a worthy and enduring testament to one man's creative endeavours and to another's explicatory devotion. It reveals far more about Tolkien's invented world than any of his readers in pre-Silmarillion days could ever have imagined or hoped for." He concludes that thorough study of the twelve volumes would be essential for understanding "Tolkien's imaginative art".

Liz Milner, for A Green Man Review, writes that the series provides "an unprecedented opportunity to examine a great writer's creative development over a period of 60 years". She adds that Christopher Tolkien's editing demonstrated "the endurance and cleaning power of Hercules", given that his father's papers were all in disorder.

Wayne G. Hammond and Christina Scull, in VII, describe Tolkien's mythology as documented in the History as "a work of extraordinary power and scope". They note that only with the History's publication can that at last be judged; and that the legendarium as left to his son Christopher was "an immense and extremely complex set of writings". They note, too, that readers were hoping for "another Lord of the Rings". Christopher created The Silmarillion as a "coherent and internally self-consistent narrative" by fitting together and modifying his father's drafts, which had been written in different styles, degrees of detail, and degrees of completeness. But this gave little idea of the diversity or process of continual change embodied in the legendarium. Accordingly, Christopher set to work on the History to try to tackle the "infinite variety" of his father's writings, from prose to alliterative verse, from cosmology and annals to time-travel stories. Hammond and Scull note that some readers felt that the History "should never have been published, that it is a disservice to Tolkien to display his missteps and false starts". They note, too, that other fans have objected to it "on false grounds of 'canonicity'", arguing that Tolkien had not "approve[d] these texts for publication", nor fixed the details for use in games and the like. Hammond and Scull answer that the History was meant to present "not a fixed design, but a living creation, and the process by which Tolkien gave it life." In their view, it offers "a unique opportunity to view the creative spark, a fascinating insight into the work of one of the most imaginative and influential writers of the twentieth century". They predict that it would start "a new era" in Tolkien studies.

== Analysis ==
=== A life's work ===
Sample from "The Music of the Ainur" in Book of Lost Tales 1 (History volume 1, 1983)
Christopher Tolkien's commentary	J. R. R. Tolkien's text
In another notebook identical to that in which The Cottage of Lost Play was written out by my mother, there is a text in ink in my father's hand ... entitled: Link between Cottage of Lost Play and (Tale 2) Music of Ainur. This follows on directly from Vairë's last words to Eriol, and in turn links on directly to The Music of the Ainur ... The Link exists in only one version, for the text in ink was written over a draft in pencil that was wholly erased.	'But', said Eriol, 'still are there many things that remain dark to me. Indeed I would fain know who be these Valar; are they the Gods?' 'So be they', said Lindo, 'though concerning them Men tell many strange and garbled tales that are far from the truth...'; but Vairë said: 'Nay then, Lindo, be not drawn into more tale-telling tonight, for the hour of rest is at hand, and for all his eagerness our guest is way-worn. Send now for the candles of sleep, ...

In 1967, Tolkien named his son Christopher as his literary executor, and more specifically as his co-author of The Silmarillion. After his father's death in 1973, Christopher took a large quantity of legendarium manuscripts to his Oxfordshire home, where he converted a barn into a workspace. He and the young Guy Gavriel Kay started work on the documents, discovering by 1975 how complex the task was likely to be. In September 1975 he resigned from his position at New College, Oxford, to work exclusively on editing his father's writings. He moved to the south of France and continued this task for 45 years. In all, he edited and published 24 volumes of his father's writings, including the 12 of the History. In those volumes, Verlyn Flieger writes,

Christopher arranged and edited in chronological sequence all the stories of his father's mythology. Now published as the twelve-volume series, The History of Middle-earth, this work presents Tolkien's mythology in its entirety, tracing the path of a remarkable vision, a musical score, if you will, from its earliest conception to its author's last meditations on his creation.

=== Challenges ===
Christopher Tolkien's task was complicated by numerous features of the manuscripts. The drafts were handwritten, often hastily, making them hard to decipher. Many were in pencil; earlier pencilled versions were often erased and overwritten. Drafts were frequently annotated or extended on the same sheets of paper, making the exact sequence hard to reconstruct. The papers were in disorder; relative dates had to be worked out from evidence in the texts, or occasionally from his father's use or reuse of a stock of paper that derived from a certain place or time, giving an earliest bound to the dating of those manuscripts.

=== Editorial framing ===
The scholar Gergely Nagy observes that Tolkien "thought of his works as texts within the fictional world" (his emphasis), and that the overlapping of different and sometimes contradictory accounts was central to his desired effect. Further, Tolkien was a philologist; Nagy comments that Tolkien may have been intentionally imitating the philological style of authors such as Elias Lönnrot, compiler of the Finnish epic, the Kalevala, whom Tolkien saw as an exemplar of a professional and creative philology. This was, Nagy believes, what Tolkien thought essential if he was to present a mythology for England, since such a thing had to have been written by many hands. Further, writes Nagy, by publishing his father's writings, Christopher Tolkien, also a philologist, "inserted himself in the functional place of Bilbo" as editor and collator, in his view "reinforcing the mythopoeic effect" that his father had wanted to achieve, making the published book do what Bilbo's book was meant to do, and so unintentionally realising his father's intention. Tolkien's Middle-earth writings had become, in reality and no longer only in fiction, a complex work by different hands edited, annotated, and commented upon over a long period.

Elizabeth Whittingham writes that Tolkien valued the impression of depth that the mention of much older events had created in The Lord of the Rings, and that he realised he could not do the same for the Silmarillion stories as they were in that older time. Instead, a man from a later age, such as Eriol of The Book of Lost Tales, could visit Middle-earth and listen to the tales of the Elves, providing a frame story. He records the stories, she writes, and "Eriol's perspective becomes the reader's, ... separat[ing] readers from these tales of past loss and faded glory."

Flieger comments that Christopher's remark in the introduction to The Book of Lost Tales 1, that he had made an error in not providing any sort of frame story for his 1977 The Silmarillion, is at least partly correct. In her view, the one-volume Silmarillion "gives a misleading impression of coherence and finality, as if it were a definitive, canonical text", while in fact the legendarium from which it is adapted "is a jumble of overlapping and often competing stories, annals, and lexicons." All the same, she writes, that book was essential, as without it the History would never have been published, and the twelve-volume work "provides exactly the framework its editor [Christopher] felt was lacking in the earlier and in some ways premature book."

Vincent Ferré writes that Christopher Tolkien's editing of the 12 volumes of The History of Middle-earth, using his skill as a philologist, created an editorial frame for his father's legendarium, and for the books derived from it. Ferré comments that this presented his father's writings as historical, a real set of legends from the past, in just the same way that his editing of The Monsters and the Critics, and Other Essays presented his father's essays as scholarly work.

Editorial framing of The Monsters and the Critics, and Other Essays by Christopher Tolkien presents it as a set of scholarly texts.

Christopher Tolkien's editorial framing of the 12 volumes of The History of Middle-earth presents his father's legendarium, and the books derived from it, as a set of historic texts, analogous to the presentation of genuine scholarly works like The Monsters and The Critics; and it creates a narrative voice throughout the series, a figure of Christopher Tolkien himself.

Outside Christopher Tolkien's editorial frame, other authors have contributed more humorous framing elements. Tolkien's friend and fellow-Inkling, C. S. Lewis, greatly enjoyed The Lay of Leithian, going so far as to invent scholars Peabody and Pumpernickel who comment on what Lewis pretends is an ancient text. Mark Shea wrote a mock work of philological scholarship, set in the distant future, and looking back at the works attributed to Tolkien and to Peter Jackson. Shea states that "Experts in source-criticism now know that The Lord of the Rings is a redaction of sources ranging from The Red Book of Westmarch (W) to Elvish Chronicles (E) to Gondorian records (G) to orally transmitted tales of the Rohirrim (R)," each with "their own agendas", like "the 'Tolkien' (T) and 'Peter Jackson' (PJ) redactors". He notes confidently that "we may be quite certain that 'Tolkien' (if he ever existed) did not write this work in the conventional sense, but that it was assembled over a long period of time..."

== Sources ==
- Bratman, David (2000). "The Literary Value of 'The History of Middle-earth'". Contributions to the Study of Science Fiction and Fantasy (86): 69–94.
- Carpenter, Humphrey (1977). J. R. R. Tolkien: A Biography. New York: Ballantine Books. ISBN 978-0-04-928037-3.
- Ferré, Vincent (2022). "The Son Behind the Father: Christopher Tolkien as a Writer". In Ovenden, Richard; McIlwaine, Catherine (eds.). The Great Tales Never End: Essays in Memory of Christopher Tolkien. Bodleian Library Publishing. pp. 53–69. ISBN 978-1-8512-4565-9.
- Flieger, Verlyn (2005). Interrupted Music: The Making Of Tolkien's Mythology. Kent State University Press. ISBN 0-87338-824-0.
- Ovenden, Richard; McIlwaine, Catherine, eds. (2022). The Great Tales Never End: Essays in Memory of Christopher Tolkien. Bodleian Library Publishing. ISBN 978-1-8512-4565-9.
- Whittingham, Elizabeth A. (2008). The Evolution of Tolkien's Mythology: A Study of the History of Middle-earth. McFarland & Company. ISBN 978-1-4766-1174-7.
