= The Peoples of Middle-earth =

Twelfth of the 12 volumes of 'The History of Middle-earth'

- Editor: Christopher Tolkien
- Author: J. R. R. Tolkien
- Language: English
- Series: The History of Middle-earth
- Release number: 12
- Subject: Tolkien's legendarium
- Genre: High fantasy Literary analysis
- Publisher: Allen & Unwin (UK)
- Publication date: 1996
- Publication place: United Kingdom
- Media type: Print (hardback and paperback)
- Pages: 512 (paperback)
- ISBN: 978-0261103481
- Preceded by: The War of the Jewels

The Peoples of Middle-earth (1996) is the 12th and final volume of The History of Middle-earth, edited by Christopher Tolkien from the unpublished manuscripts of his father J. R. R. Tolkien. Some characters (including Anairë, the wife of Fingolfin) only appear here, as do a few other works that did not fit anywhere else.

== Contents ==
Navigable diagram of Tolkien's legendarium. The Peoples of Middle-earth, the last volume of analysis of the legendarium, contains materials written late in his life.

Each volume of The History of Middle-earth bears on the title page spread an inscription by Christopher Tolkien in Fëanorian letters (in Tengwar, an alphabet J. R. R. Tolkien devised for the High-Elves), that describes the contents of the book. The inscription in Volume XII reads: "This is the last volume of the work of Christopher Tolkien in which he has collected a great part of all that his father John Ronald Reuel Tolkien wrote of Middle-earth and Valinor. In this book is traced the devising of the history of the later ages in the Northwest of Middle-earth after the Great Battle and the Fall of Morgoth."

=== Part One: The Prologue and Appendices to The Lord of the Rings ===
This section focuses on covering the development of the Prologue and Appendices of The Lord of the Rings as well as the Akallabêth, along with themes and ideas associated with them. It is by far the most substantial section of the book, consisting of nearly 300 of the book's 480 text pages. It includes early drafts of the novel's Prologue and the appendices on languages, family trees, and calendars, as well as the history of the Akallabêth, "The Tale of Years" (chronologies of the Second and Third Ages), the heirs of Elendil, and the making of Appendix A.

=== Part Two: Late Writings ===
Materials mostly postdating 1969, consisting of the essays "Of Dwarves and Men", on the development of the languages of these races; "The Shibboleth of Fëanor", on the linguistics of the Elvish language of Quenya and giving etymologies for the names of the princes of the Noldor; "The Problem of Ros", exploring the suffix "-ros" found in certain names such as Elros and Maedhros; and some "last writings" addressing the subjects of the Istari (Wizards), Glorfindel of Gondolin and Rivendell, and Círdan the Shipwright.

=== Part Three: The Teachings of Pengoloð ===
A brief narrative going back to the Book of Lost Tales period, presenting information provided by Pengoloð of Gondolin to Ælfwine of England in regard to the sundering of the Elven tongues.

=== Part Four: Incomplete Tales ===
Two stories written in the 1950s.

==== The New Shadow ====
"The New Shadow" is a sequel to The Lord of the Rings, set a little over a century later in the time of King Eldarion, Aragorn's son. The editor mentions (p. 409) that Tolkien wrote three versions of the beginning of this story, but all were abandoned after a few pages.

==== Tal-Elmar ====
"Tal-Elmar" is set in the Second Age and tells of the Númenórean colonization of Middle-earth from the point of view of the Wild Men. The title character and protagonist, one of the ancient inhabitants of the lands of Gondor, is partly descended from Númenórean settlers.

== Reception ==
=== An intricate history ===
Charles Noad, in Mallorn, comments that the book "at long last" provides Tolkien's account of the "reincarnation" of Glorfindel, a character who appears both in The Silmarillion and (thousands of years later) in The Lord of the Rings.

Noad writes that "Christopher Tolkien warned that a history of the Appendices would prove 'both far-ranging and intricate'; and so they have." Noad describes the situation with the Appendices for The Lord of the Rings as a "debacle". He notes Tolkien's unpreparedness for publishing the extensive Appendices that he had hoped would accompany the narrative of The Lord of the Rings as putting him in a weak position to defend their inclusion. In the event, he had to compress them extremely heavily, which was "a pity": and he did not "re-expand" them in the second edition. Noad comments that given this much trouble with the Appendices, it was "extraordinarily optimistic" of him to imagine that he could have published The Silmarillion at the same time.

=== Reframing Middle-earth ===
Noad remarks, too, on the Note on the Shire Records which Tolkien added to the 2nd edition Prologue, as it "dismantled the framing mechanism for The Silmarillion that had survived for the past half-century." The frame story had involved Eriol or Ælfwine of England who had visited Tol Eressea and been briefed by an Elf, Pengoloð; the wandering mariner had written it all down and it had come into Tolkien's hands. But the Note has instead Bilbo Baggins's three volumes of "great skill and learning", written from the library at Rivendell, mainly describing "the Elder Days", i.e. The Silmarillion. So, Noad writes, Bilbo's work "makes Ælfwine's tales redundant." He wonders why Tolkien would have made this major change, since having Ælfwine for ancient times and Bilbo for the later ones was "perfectly reasonable and coherent". Noad suggests that perhaps Tolkien thought that the Straight Road was no longer available by the 20th century, so that the traveller could not have used it. Or perhaps, he suggests, Tolkien had at last dropped the "old dream" of providing a mythology for England, linking the legendarium to English history.

== See also ==
- The Nature of Middle-earth, edited by Carl Hostetter, effectively the next volume of the series
