= Elizabeth Whittingham =

Tolkien scholar

Elizabeth Whittingham is a former lecturer in English at the State University of New York College, Brockport, New York. She is known for her Tolkien studies research, including her 2008 book The Evolution of Tolkien's Mythology, which examines the development of his legendarium as published in the 12-volume The History of Middle-earth.

== Life ==
Elizabeth Whittingham is the daughter of Thomas Whittingham and his wife Dorothy M. McEwen, who was chair of nursing at Roberts Wesleyan College. She was a lecturer in English at the State University of New York College, Brockport, New York, and at Monroe Community College, Rochester, New York. She has contributed to The J. R. R. Tolkien Encyclopedia. She retired from teaching early in the 2020s.

== Tolkien studies ==
Whittingham wrote one of the first scholarly studies of Christopher Tolkien's 12-volume The History of Middle-earth (1983–1996), focusing on the Silmarillion legendarium (and avoiding the history of the Lord of the Rings), in her 2008 book The Evolution of Tolkien's Mythology, based on her PhD thesis. She contributed a chapter on Unfinished Tales and The History of Middle-earth to the 2014 Wiley-Blackwell A Companion to J. R. R. Tolkien, and a chapter on Tolkien's music and songs to the 2019 book Music in Tolkien's Work and Beyond, from which she has been quoted as stating that music is "the most powerful force in Tolkien's universe".

== Reception ==
=== The Evolution of Tolkien's Mythology ===
Deidre Dawson, reviewing The Evolution of Tolkien's Mythology in Tolkien Studies, noted that it was one of the first books on Christopher Tolkien's 12-volume work, barring studies such as those by Verlyn Flieger and Tom Shippey. She finds the analysis of theology and comparative mythology "quite dense", showing an "impressive" command of both the legendarium and Tolkien's ancient sources, and finds "convincing" the argument for the growing importance of "Judeo-Christian theology" in Tolkien's writings. She disagrees, however, with Whittingham's claim that his struggles with the legendarium's original flat world cosmology showed that "his mythology was not relevant to people of a modern, scientific age". On the contrary, Dawson writes, if he had failed to make his mythology relevant, there would neither be so many readers of his work, nor such a variety of researchers studying it.

B. N. Wolfe, reviewing the book for the Oxford C. S. Lewis Society, writes that it does much that should assist other scholars, and is "serious scholarship in a field full of insubstantial popularizations." Wolfe is relieved that while Whittingham acknowledges her debt to Flieger, she does not agree with Flieger's view that "most of Tolkien's ideas" came from Owen Barfield. All the same, Wolfe suggests that Barfield should have been discussed. He finds interesting her analysis of Christopher Tolkien's elimination of all forms of framing of The Silmarillion as he published it. Overall, he recommends the book, forgiving its "many" faults since "it is blazing a relatively new path".

David Bratman, in Mythlore, writes that the book is a "good start" on scholarship about the history of Tolkien's writing, which like Tolkien's legendarium itself "takes time to absorb". He notes that it is among the first book-scale studies of The History of Middle-earth, following Flieger's work on the time-travel aspects and its frame structure. In his view, however, the book is more like Christina Scull's essay in the 2000 collection Tolkien's Legendarium. He writes that Whittingham's chapters look at the "serious" topics that Tolkien addresses, in an order which is both logical and in the same order as in The Silmarillion.

David Bratman's analysis of Whittingham's chapter themes, matched to The Silmarillion
Theme	Meaning	The Silmarillion	Notes
Cosmogony	Creation of the world of Arda	Ainulindalë	
Theogony	Pantheon of the Valar	Valaquenta	
Cosmology	Structure of the world	Quenta Silmarillion	From flat earth to round world; Arda lit by two lamps, then by the Two Trees of Valinor, then by Sun and Moon
Thanatology	Death and immortality	Akallabêth	Númenor attacks Valinor in the false hope of gaining immortality. Theme also in tales of Beren and Lúthien, Finwë and Míriel
Eschatology	The end of the world and ultimate destiny	Final paragraphs of Quenta Silmarillion	

== Sources ==
- Bratman, David (2008). "Review of The Evolution of Tolkien's Mythology: A Study of the History of Middle-earth, by E. A. Whittingham". Mythlore. 26 (3/4): 201–203. JSTOR 26814594.
- Dawson, Deidre A. (2008). "[Review:] The Evolution of Tolkien's Mythology: A Study of the History of Middle-earth (review)". Tolkien Studies. 5 (1): 205–209. doi:10.1353/tks.0.0028. S2CID 170596445.
- Lee, Stuart D., ed. (2022) [2014]. A Companion to J. R. R. Tolkien. Wiley Blackwell. OCLC 1183854105.
- Rone, Vincent E. (2022). "The Musical Continuity between Howard Shore and J.R.R. Tolkien". Tolkien Studies. 19 (2): 113–141. doi:10.1353/tks.2022.0015. ISSN 1547-3163.
- Whittingham, Elizabeth A. (2008). The Evolution of Tolkien's Mythology: A Study of the History of Middle-earth. McFarland. ISBN 978-1-4766-1174-7.
- Whittingham, Elizabeth A. (2019). "'A Matter of Song': The Power of Music and Song in Tolkien's Legendarium". In Julian Eilmann; Friedhelm Schneidewind (eds.). Music in Tolkien's Work and Beyond. Walking Tree Publishers. pp. 135–158.
