= Arda =

Arda or ARDA may refer to:

== Arts and entertainment ==
- Arda (Middle-earth), fictional world in the works of J. R. R. Tolkien
- Arda (band), a Russian heavy metal band

== People ==
- Arda (name)

== Places ==
- Arda (Maritsa), a river in Bulgaria and Greece
- Arda (Italy), a river in Italy
- Arda (Douro), a river in Portugal
- Arda, Bulgaria, a village in southern Bulgaria
- Arda, County Fermanagh, a townland in County Fermanagh, Northern Ireland
- Arda Peak, in Antarctica

== Biology ==
- Amphisbaena arda, Rodrigues, 2003, a worm lizard species in the genus Amphisbaena
- Perzelia arda, a moth species

== Acronym ==
- Advanced Research and Development Activity
- Association of Religion Data Archives
