= Tolkien's moral dilemma =

Ethical issue in Middle-earth fiction

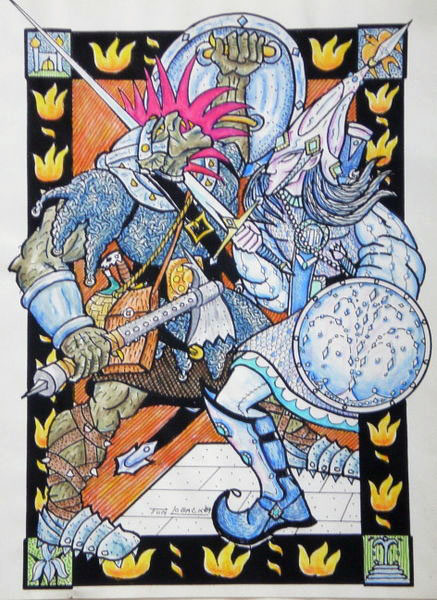
The Elf Ecthelion slays the Orc champion Orcobal in Gondolin. 2007 illustration by Tom Loback

J. R. R. Tolkien, a devout Catholic, (Note: Carpenter 2023, Letter 142 to Robert Murray, 2 December 1953) created what he came to feel was a moral dilemma for himself with his supposedly evil Middle-earth peoples like Orcs, when he made them able to speak. This identified them as sentient and sapient; indeed, he portrayed them talking about right and wrong. This meant, he believed, that they were open to morality, like Men. In Tolkien's Christian framework, that in turn meant they must have souls, so killing them would be wrong without very good reason. Orcs serve as the principal forces of the enemy in The Lord of the Rings, where they are slaughtered in large numbers in the battles of Helm's Deep and the Pelennor Fields in particular. (Note: Tolkien 1954, book 3, ch. 7 "Helm's Deep") (Note: Tolkien 1955, book 5, ch. 6 "The Battle of the Pelennor Fields")

If Tolkien wanted killing Orcs not to be such a problem, then they would have to be without any moral sense, like ordinary animals. Both Tolkien and other scholars have been aware of the contradiction implied by this position: if Orcs were essentially "beasts", then they should not have had a moral sense; if they were corrupted Elves, then treating them as "other" to be slaughtered was straightforward racism. Tolkien made repeated attempts to resolve the dilemma, trying different approaches but not arriving at what he felt was a satisfactory solution. (Note: Tolkien 1977 ch. 3 "Of the Coming of the Elves"; ch. 10 "Of the Sindar") (Note: Tolkien 1984b "The Fall of Gondolin") (Note: Tolkien 1993, "Myths transformed", X)

== Context ==
J. R. R. Tolkien was an English author and philologist of ancient Germanic languages, specialising in Old English; he spent much of his career as a professor at the University of Oxford. He is best known for his novels about his invented Middle-earth, The Hobbit and The Lord of the Rings, and for the posthumously published The Silmarillion which provides a more mythical narrative about earlier ages. He invented several peoples for Middle-earth, including Elves, Dwarves, Hobbits, Orcs, Trolls, Ents, and Eagles. Orcs serve as the principal forces of the enemy in The Lord of the Rings, where they are slaughtered in large numbers in the battles of Helm's Deep and the Pelennor Fields in particular. A devout Catholic, he described The Lord of the Rings as "a fundamentally religious and Catholic work", rich in Christian symbolism.

== Implied morality ==
=== Men and elves ===
In the cosmology of Tolkien's legendarium, Men live only in the world (Arda), are able to die from it, have souls, and may ultimately go to Heaven, though this is left vague in the Legendarium. The Tolkien scholar Tom Shippey notes that in the Middle English source, the South English Legendary from c. 1250, which he presumes Tolkien must have read, Elves appear on Earth and in the Earthly Paradise, leaving a puzzle as to whether they had souls. Since they could not leave the world, the answer was no; but given that they did not disappear completely on death, the answer had to have been yes. In The Silmarillion, Tolkien similarly has the Elves go not to Heaven but to the halfway house of the Halls of Mandos on Valinor.

=== Anthropomorphized animals ===
Wargs, great wolf-like beasts, can attack independently, as they do while the Fellowship of the Ring is going south from Rivendell, (Note: Tolkien 1954a, book 2, ch. 4 "A Journey in the Dark") and soon after Thorin's Company emerged from the Misty Mountains. The group of Wargs in The Hobbit could speak, though never pleasantly. (Note: Tolkien 1937, ch. 6 "Out of the Frying-pan into the Fire") The critic Gregory Hartley notes that Tolkien uses several types of anthropomorphized animals, such as the great eagles, giant spiders, Smaug the dragon, ravens and thrushes. Hartley states that the Wargs on the other hand do not rise above the level of beasts, as they do not "speak the language of humans; they do not act independently; they do not possess autonomous wills or build civilizations". He notes on the other hand that Tolkien writes about Wargs' actions using verbs like "[to] plan" and "[to] guard", giving an "illusion of sentience". In Hartley's view, this creates a "suspicion" that the Wargs are "more than mere beasts", from which "one might easily begin to build a case for Warg autonomy"; but he at once states that making the Wargs sentient "denies a fundamental reality of the stories", since "they behave like animals". He comments in particular that they are ridden by Orcs, and that their behaviour "never transcends the bestial".

Tolkien faced the question of the Great Eagles' nature with apparent hesitation. In early writings there was no need to define it precisely, since he imagined that, beside the Valar, "many lesser spirits ... both great and small" had entered Eä upon its creation; (Note: Tolkien 1987, "Quenta Silmarillion", §2) and such sapient creatures as the Eagles or Huan the Hound, in Tolkien's own words, "have been rather lightly adopted from less 'serious' mythologies". (Note: Tolkien 1993, "Myths Transformed", VIII) The phrase "spirits in the shape of hawks and eagles" in The Silmarillion derives from that stage of writing. (Note: Tolkien 1987, "Ainulindalë") For some time Tolkien considered the Eagles as bird-shaped Maiar. (Note: Tolkien 1993, "The Annals of Aman") However, he had already said in The Lord of the Rings that Gwaihir and Landroval were descended from the Eagle Thorondor, so no supernatural origin was involved. Tolkien had also, long before then, rejected the notion of their being "Children" of the Valar and Maiar. (Note: Tolkien 1993, "The Annals of Aman"; "The Later Quenta Silmarillion", ch. 1) In the last of his notes on this topic, dated by his son Christopher to the late 1950s, Tolkien decided that the Great Eagles were animals that had been "taught language by the Valar, and raised to a higher level—but they still had no fëar [souls]."

=== Orcs ===
A more serious problem arose for Tolkien, especially with apparently wholly evil beings, especially Orcs, but it applies also to others such as Wargs and Trolls. Since in Catholic theology evil cannot make, only mock, Orcs cannot have an equal and opposite morality to that of Men; but since they can reason about their lives and have a moral sense (though they are unable to keep to it), they cannot be described as wholly evil. (Note: Tolkien 1993, "Myths Transformed" VIII)

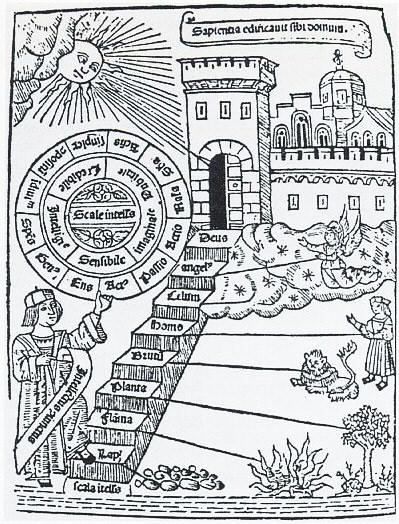
Scholars have noted that Middle-earth assumes a fixed hierarchy of beings, like the medieval great chain of being. (Ramon Llull's Ladder of Ascent and Descent of the Mind, 1305, pictured)

All of this implies, as various scholars have commented, a hierarchy of races comparable with the medieval great chain of being, representing a range of moral complexity from Men – unquestionably sapient and subject to moral judgement – down to mere beasts, which are free of morality. In between, however, are several peoples, which at least sometimes have the power of speech, but that Tolkien implies are wholly evil and without morality, raising questions about what that could mean.

=== Towards a hierarchy of beings ===
After completing The Lord of the Rings, and realizing he had created a variety of theological problems with his races of beings, Tolkien moved toward a more carefully defined hierarchical system. At the top were incarnates or "Children of Ilúvatar": Elves and Men, those who possessed fëar or souls, with the defining characteristic of being able to speak; (Note: Tolkien 1994, "Quendi and Eldar") next were self-incarnates, the Valar and Maiar, "angelic" spirits that "arrayed" themselves in bodily forms of the incarnates or of animals, and were able to communicate both by thought and speech; and finally animals, mere beasts, unable to speak.

The Tolkien scholars Paul Kocher and Shippey note that in The Hobbit, the narrator provides a firm moral framework, with good elves, evil goblins (Orcs), and the other peoples like Eagles somewhere in between. The narrator says that the Eagles are "not kindly birds", and clearly carnivorous enough to eat a small rabbit-like Hobbit. (Note: Tolkien 1937, "Out of the Frying-Pan and into the Fire")

Speech and morality of Tolkien's Middle-earth peoples
People	Able to speak The Hobbit	Able to speak Lord of the Rings	Moral sense	Origin	So, they have souls?
Men	Yes	Yes	Yes, leading to constant struggle	Created sapient	Yes, unproblematic
Orcs	Yes	Yes	Unable to live up to own standards	Corrupted Elves?	Yes?
Great Eagles	Yes	Yes	Helpful but carnivorous	Derived from beasts?	No?
Wargs	Yes	No	None, uniformly evil	Derived from beasts?	No?
Trolls	Yes	Yes (Note: The Trolls in The Lord of the Rings do not speak anywhere in the narrative. Tolkien states in an appendix that they can speak, but rarely do.)	None, uniformly evil	Derived from beasts?	No?
Beasts	No	No	None	Created non-sapient	No, unproblematic

== Dilemma ==
=== Wholly evil, or with a moral sense ===
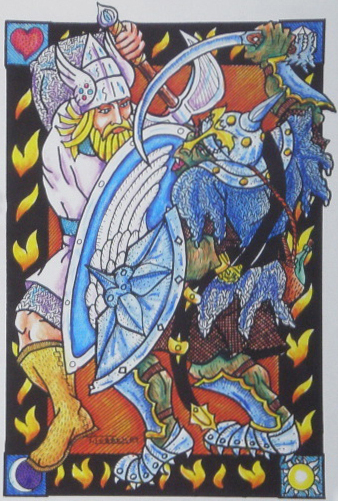
The hero Tuor, a Man, slays the Orc Othrod: scholars have suggested that for Tolkien, Orcs were a conveniently wholly evil enemy that could be slaughtered without mercy. 2007 illustration by Tom Loback

Scholars have noted that Tolkien's Orcs are depicted as wholly evil, meaning that they could be slaughtered without regret. All the same, Tolkien made them human-like both in being able to speak, and in having a similar concept of good and evil, a moral sense of fairness, even if they are totally unable to apply their morals to themselves. This presented Tolkien, as a devout Catholic, with a theological problem: since "evil cannot make, only mock", the at least somewhat morally-aware Orcs could not have been created by evil as a genuinely new and separate species. Tolkien considered an alternative, that they were corrupted from one of Middle-earth's free peoples, such as Elves, which would imply that they were fully moral and possibly even had immortal souls, but found that option equally unpalatable. Tolkien realized that some of the decisions he had made in his 1937 children's book The Hobbit, showing his goblins (Orcs) as even slightly civilised, and giving his animals the power of speech, clearly implied sapience; this conflicted with the more measured theology behind his legendarium.

An Orc's view of morality

'It's my guess you won't find much in that little fellow,' said Gorbag [an Orc]. 'He may have had nothing to do with the real mischief. The big fellow with the sharp sword doesn't seem to have thought him worth much anyhow – just left him lying: regular elvish trick.'

— The Two Towers, book 4, ch. 10 "The Choices of Master Samwise" (Note: Tolkien 1954, book 4, ch. 10 "The Choices of Master Samwise")

Shippey writes that the Orcs in The Lord of the Rings were almost certainly created just to equip Middle-earth with "a continual supply of enemies over whom one need feel no compunction", or in Tolkien's words from "Beowulf: The Monsters and the Critics", "the infantry of the old war", ready to be slaughtered. Shippey states that all the same, orcs share the human concept of good and evil, with a familiar sense of morality, though he comments that, like many people, Orcs are quite unable to apply their morals to themselves. He notes that in The Two Towers, Tolkien has the Orc Gorbag disapprove of the "regular elvish trick" of abandoning a comrade, as he wrongly supposes Sam has done with Frodo. Shippey describes the implied view of evil as Boethian, that evil is the absence of good; he notes, however, that Tolkien did not agree with that point of view, believing that evil had to be actively combatted, with war if necessary—the Manichean position.

In a 1954 letter, Tolkien wrote that Orcs were "fundamentally a race of 'rational incarnate' creatures, though horribly corrupted, if no more so than many Men to be met today." (Note: Carpenter 2023, letter 153 to Peter Hastings, draft, September 1954) The Tolkien scholar Zach Watkins wrote that Tolkien had "constructed the orcs to be at least potentially moral beings". Robert T. Tally wrote in Mythlore that despite the uniform presentation of orcs as "loathsome, ugly, cruel, feared, and especially terminable", "Tolkien could not resist the urge to flesh out and 'humanize' these inhuman creatures from time to time", in the process giving them their own morality. Stentor Danielson describes the Orcs as cutting trees "just for fun" and "out of pride in their ability to do so", noting that the character Treebeard calls the behaviour "orc-mischief".

=== Tolkien's search for a resolution ===
Tolkien attempted to resolve the dilemma about his Orcs by proposing several semi-contradictory theories for their origins. In The Tale of Tinúviel, Orcs originate as "foul broodlings of Melkor who fared abroad doing his evil work". (Note: Tolkien 1984b, "The Tale of Tinúviel") In The Silmarillion, Orcs are primal Elves "corrupted and enslaved", tortured, and bred by Melkor "in envy and mockery of the Elves"; later on, Elves of Beleriand thought them "perhaps to be Avari who had become evil and savage in the wild; in which they guessed all too near, it is said." They bred like Elves and Men: "For the Orcs had life and multiplied after the manner of the Children of Ilúvatar". In "The Fall of Gondolin" Morgoth made them of slime by sorcery, "bred from the heats and slimes of the earth". Alternatively, they were "beasts of humanized shape", possibly, Tolkien wrote, Elves mated with beasts, and later Men. Or again, Tolkien suggested, they could have been fallen Maiar, perhaps a kind called Boldog, like lesser Balrogs; or corrupted Men. If they were just "beasts" then they should not have had any morality of their own; but if they were fallen Elves or Maiar, then they certainly did, and valuing them as "other", to be killed without mercy, would in the opinion of Tolkien scholars like R. T. Tally be straightforward racism.

The origins and morality of Orcs: the Catholic Tolkien's dilemma
Issue	Created evil?	Like animals?	Created good, but fallen?
Origin of Orcs according to Tolkien	"Brooded" by Morgoth	"Beasts of humanized shape"	Fallen Maiar, or corrupted Men/Elves
Moral implication	Orcs are wholly evil (unlike Men).	Orcs have no power of speech and no morality.	Orcs have morality just like Men.
Resulting problem	Orcs like Gorbag have a moral sense (even if they cannot keep to it) and can speak, which conflicts with their being wholly evil. Since evil cannot make, only mock, Orcs cannot have an equal and opposite morality to Men.		Orcs should be treated with mercy, where possible.

== See also ==
- Tolkien's round world dilemma – another dilemma that Tolkien never resolved, on whether Arda should be a planet in space, or should have a mythological past

== Sources ==
- Burns, Marjorie (2005). Perilous Realms: Celtic and Norse in Tolkien's Middle-earth. Toronto, Ontario, Canada: University of Toronto Press. ISBN 0-8020-3806-9.
- Carpenter, Humphrey (1977). J. R. R. Tolkien: A Biography. New York: Ballantine Books. ISBN 978-0-04-928037-3.
- Carpenter, Humphrey, ed. (2023) [1981]. The Letters of J. R. R. Tolkien: Revised and Expanded Edition. New York: HarperCollins. ISBN 978-0-35-865298-4.
- Danielson, Stentor (2021). ""To trees all Men are Orcs": The Environmental Ethic of J.R.R. Tolkien's "The New Shadow"". Tolkien Studies. 18 (1). Project Muse: 179–194. doi:10.1353/tks.2021.0011. ISSN 1547-3163. S2CID 241036661.
- Evans, Jonathan (2013) [2007]. "Monsters". In Drout, Michael D. C. (ed.). J.R.R. Tolkien Encyclopedia: Scholarship and Critical Assessment. pp. 433–434. ISBN 9780415969420.
- Hartley, Gregory (2014). "Civilized goblins and Talking Animals: How The Hobbit Created Problems of Sentience for Tolkien". In Bradford Lee Eden (ed.). The Hobbit and Tolkien's mythology: essays on revisions and influences. Vol. Part III: Themes. McFarland. ISBN 978-0-7864-7960-3. OCLC 889426663. Archived from the original on 25 February 2023.
- Kocher, Paul (1974) [1972]. Master of Middle-earth: The Achievement of J. R. R. Tolkien. Penguin Books. ISBN 0140038779.
- Shippey, Tom (2001). J. R. R. Tolkien: Author of the Century. HarperCollins. ISBN 978-0261-10401-3.
- Tally, Robert T. Jr. (2010). "Let Us Now Praise Famous Orcs: Simple Humanity in Tolkien's Inhuman Creatures". Mythlore. 29 (1). article 3.
- Shippey, Tom (2005) [1982]. The Road to Middle-Earth: How J. R. R. Tolkien Created a New Mythology (Third ed.). HarperCollins. ISBN 978-0-261-10275-0.
- Tolkien, J. R. R. (1937). Douglas A. Anderson (ed.). The Annotated Hobbit. Boston: Houghton Mifflin (published 2002). ISBN 978-0-618-13470-0.
- Tolkien, J. R. R. (1954a). The Fellowship of the Ring. The Lord of the Rings. Boston: Houghton Mifflin. OCLC 9552942.
- Tolkien, J. R. R. (1954). The Two Towers. The Lord of the Rings. Boston: Houghton Mifflin. OCLC 1042159111.
- Tolkien, J. R. R. (1955). The Return of the King. The Lord of the Rings. Boston: Houghton Mifflin. OCLC 519647821.
- Tolkien, J. R. R. (1977). Christopher Tolkien (ed.). The Silmarillion. Boston: Houghton Mifflin. ISBN 978-0-395-25730-2.
- Tolkien, J. R. R. (1984b). Christopher Tolkien (ed.). The Book of Lost Tales. Vol. 2. Boston: Houghton Mifflin. ISBN 0-395-36614-3.
- Tolkien, J. R. R. (1987). Christopher Tolkien (ed.). The Lost Road and Other Writings. Boston: Houghton Mifflin. ISBN 0-395-45519-7.
- Tolkien, J. R. R. (1993). Christopher Tolkien (ed.). Morgoth's Ring. Boston: Houghton Mifflin. ISBN 0-395-68092-1.
- Tolkien, J. R. R. (1994). Christopher Tolkien (ed.). The War of the Jewels. Boston: Houghton Mifflin. ISBN 0-395-71041-3.
