= Morgoth's Ring =

Volume of 'The History of Middle-earth'

- Editor: Christopher Tolkien
- Author: J. R. R. Tolkien
- Language: English
- Series: The History of Middle-earth
- Subject: Tolkien's legendarium
- Genre: High fantasy Literary analysis
- Publisher: HarperCollins (UK)
- Publication date: 1993
- Media type: Print (hardback and paperback)
- Pages: 496 (paperback)
- ISBN: 978-0261103009
- Preceded by: The History of The Lord of the Rings
- Followed by: The War of the Jewels

Morgoth's Ring (1993) is the tenth volume of Christopher Tolkien's 12-volume series The History of Middle-earth in which he analyses the unpublished manuscripts of his father J. R. R. Tolkien. It contains "The Annals of Aman" which presents the history of Arda with year-by-year entries like real-world annals, and "Athrabeth Finrod ah Andreth" which presents a discussion of death and immortality between an Elf and a human.

Reviewers welcomed the volume, noting that it reveals Tolkien exploring hard questions about his mythology, and struggling to reconcile them, to the extent that he unsuccessfully attempts a destructive reworking of the entire cosmology of Arda. The issues covered include death, immortality, and the extent to which Tolkien embodied Christianity in Middle-earth; evil and the origin of Orcs; and Tolkien's attempts to replace his mythology with "feigned history".

== Book ==
=== Contents ===
Navigable diagram of Tolkien's legendarium. Morgoth's Ring presents materials related to Quenta Silmarillion.

Morgoth's Ring presents source materials and editorial commentary on the following:

- Later (1951) revisions of The Silmarillion, showing Tolkien's drastic revisiting and rewriting of his legends.
- "The Annals of Aman" – the history of the world from the entry of the Valar into Arda until the Hiding of Valinor after the revolt and exile of the Noldor. It is written in the form of year-by-year entries of varying lengths, much like real-world annals. Tolkien attributes the work to the Noldorin lore-master and linguist Rúmil of Tirion. There are three extant versions of the text, including a carefully emended manuscript, a typescript and its carbon copy, each featuring different corrections and notes, and a typescript of the earlier sections of the text that deviates from the previous typescript. Christopher Tolkien surmises that the first typescript was composed in 1958. According to the second typescript, The Annals of Aman were remembered by the Noldorin Exiles in Middle-earth, who transmitted their knowledge to the Men of Númenor, whence it eventually reached Arnor and Gondor. A reworking of the earlier "Annals of Valinor" and connected closely with the narrative of the incomplete 1937 Quenta Silmarillion, "The Annals of Aman" moves from a compressed narrative style to a fuller accounting of the events of the chronology.
- "Laws and Customs among the Eldar" – several essays and legends on the Eldar (Elves), particularly their mating and naming customs, and their conceptions of the fëa (soul) and hröa (body).
- "Athrabeth Finrod ah Andreth" – A discussion between two characters, Finrod Felagund, an Elven king, and Andreth, a mortal woman, about the nature of death and immortality, and the ways in which Elves and Men suffer their different sorrows; (Note: These themes are discussed further at "The Tale of Aragorn and Arwen" § Love and death.) and about the healing of the world and the fear of death by the hope of the coming of Eru Iluvatar into Middle-earth.
- "Tale of Adanel" – the Middle-earth version of the Fall, attached to "Athrabeth".
- "Myths Transformed" – several fragments on Morgoth, Sauron, and the problem of the origin of the Orcs. This section, which proposes inconsistent solutions to the problem, is frequently cited in discussions of Tolkien's legendarium, and represents the author's later-evolved views on some central topics.

=== Title and inscription ===
The title of this volume comes from a statement in one of Tolkien's essays: "Just as Sauron concentrated his power in the One Ring, Morgoth dispersed his power into the very matter of Arda, thus the whole of Middle-earth was Morgoth's Ring".

The title page of each volume of The History of Middle-earth displays an inscription in the Fëanorian characters (Tengwar, an alphabet devised by Tolkien for High-elven), written by Christopher Tolkien and describing the contents of the book. The inscription in Volume X reads: "In this book are given many of the later writings of John Ronald Reuel Tolkien concerning the history of the Elder Days from the Music of the Ainur to the Hiding of Valinor; here much is told of the Sun and Moon; of the immortal Eldar and the death of the Atani; of the beginning of the Orcs and of the evil power of Melkor, the Morgoth, the Black Foe of the World."

== Reception ==
=== Death, immortality, and Christianity ===
Reviewing the book for Mythlore, Glen GoodKnight wrote that in it, Christopher Tolkien leads the reader into "new third phase of his father's concept of Middle-earth after the writing of The Lord of the Rings — his recasting and adding to the mythos." In his view, the book is a major "earthquake" bringing "astounding revelations" about Tolkien's development of Middle-earth. One is the "Athrabeth Finrod ah Andreth" (The Debate of Finrod and Andreth), meant to be the last item in The Silmarillion's appendix; it presents opinions of death held by Men and Elves. Andreth complains of how unfair Man's short life is, believing death to be imposed by Morgoth, while Finrod speaks of hope, and that he believes human's death to be given by Eru, and not imposed by Morgoth. Tolkien comments on the passage that "Finrod has already guessed that the redemptive function was originally specially assigned to Men", leading GoodKnight to observe that Tolkien here aligns "his mythology very closely to his faith and theological belief in the primary world."

In her 2008 The Evolution of Tolkien's Mythology, Elizabeth Whittingham calls the Athrabeth the nearest that Tolkien got to Christian theology anywhere in his legendarium. Further, she notes, Glorfindel is the only Elf who is reincarnated, while he abandoned the concept everywhere else. According to Deidre Dawson, who reviewed her book, this suggests that Tolkien kept the "possibility" of this non-Christian concept to allow his Elves to be immortal.

=== Evil and the origin of Orcs ===
Tolkien had a long-standing and unresolved challenge with the origin of Orcs, whether they were "irredeemably evil" (if derived from evil) or as Tolkien here states, bred from Men (who would be redeemable). Amelia Rutledge writes that "theodicy, the study of justice and of the nature of evil" is the "central concern" of Morgoth's Ring. David Bratman, in Mythprint, finds interesting Tolkien's explanation that unlike Sauron, Morgoth's evil could not be fully purged from the world, because he had spread himself all through its physical matter. All in all, Bratman writes, the philosophical writings in the volume are "unlike almost anything else" in History of Middle-earth, as "what they most resemble is some of the long self-explanatory letters that Tolkien wrote to readers in the late 1950s".

=== "Feigned history" versus mythology ===
The co-founder of the Tolkien Society Charles Noad writes that Tolkien was "virtually attempting a [destructive] reinvention of his mythology", including Arda's cosmology, "Elvish reincarnation, the origins of Orcs, and the powers of Morgoth." Noad comments that the attempt to rework the cosmology was an "alarming and destructive débâcle" that would effectively had demythologised his whole mythology, but that Tolkien broadly succeeded in his other attempted problem resolutions. Dawson describes the situation as Tolkien's "steady movement away from the archetypes and structures of ancient pagan myths, towards a mythology for the modern era which includes more elements inspired by biblical texts," as seen in Morgoth's Ring.

Bratman comments that the reader enters the "Myths Transformed" section at their peril, "for here you will see the author probing the absolute rock-bottom theoretical base of his subcreation." The material reveals, too, why Tolkien could not complete The Silmarillion, as he grappled with his changing view of the acceptability of a mythology as against a "feigned history". The later volume The Nature of Middle-earth presents more of Tolkien's attempts to resolve the dilemma.

=== Structure of The Silmarillion ===
GoodKnight writes that the materials in Morgoth's Ring could have radically changed The Silmarillion, had Tolkien lived to finish it "to his satisfaction". Noad, reviewing Morgoth's Ring in Mallorn, approves of Tolkien's intention to give his planned The Silmarillion shape with the Athrabeth at the end, with the "Great Tales" printed in full as appendices to the text, a structure that would in his view have been a great improvement. He praises Christopher Tolkien for his "clarity of exposition ... clothed in expressive grace".

== See also ==
- History of Arda
