= Arda (name) =

- Pronunciation: [aɾˈda]
- Gender: Male (Turkish), Female (Armenian)

Origin
- Languages: Turkish, Old English

Arda is a given name of various origins. In Turkey, it is used as a masculine name. In Turkish, Arda means sceptre, an ornamented staff carried by rulers on ceremonial occasions as a symbol of sovereignty, and latter (successor), the Arda river (an important tributary of the Maritsa in the Edirne region), a very old Turkic name in Uyghur writings. In Armenia, it is a feminine given name. It is also a given name of Old English origin. Notable people with the name include:

== Given name ==
- Arda of Armenia, a queen of Jerusalem
- Arda Akbulut (born 2001), Turkish footballer
- Arda Anarat (born 1999), Turkish actor
- Arda Azkara (born 2003), Turkish tennis player
- Arda Bowser (1899–1996), American footballer
- Arda Çınkır (born 2002), Turkish footballer
- Arda Collins, American poet of Armenian descent
- Arda La Croix, American stage actor, screen actor, and author
- Arda Denkel (1949–2000), Turkish philosopher
- Arda Arsenian Ekmekji (born 1951), Lebanese Armenian scholar
- Arda Green (1899–1958), American biochemist
- Arda Güler (born 2005), Turkish footballer
- Arda Hakouma, Central African warlord and military commander
- Arda Kalpakian (born 1944), Lebanese athlete
- Arda Kılıç (born 2005), Turkish footballer
- Arda Kızıldağ (born 1998), Turkish footballer
- Arda Kural (born 1980), Turkish actor
- Arda Okan Kurtulan (born 2002), Turkish footballer
- Arda Mandikian (1924–2009), Greek Armenian opera singer
- Arda Ocal (born 1981), Turkish-Canadian TV and radio broadcaster
- Arda Özçimen (born 2002), Turkish footballer
- Arda Turan (born 1987), Turkish footballer
- Arda Ünyay (born 2006), Turkish footballer
- Arda Vekiloğlu (born 1979), Turkish basketball player
- Kemal Arda Gürdal (born 1990), Turkish swimmer

== Surname ==
- Ben Arda (1929–2006), Filipino professional golfer
- H. Efsun Arda, Turkish developmental and systems biologist
- Yasemin Arda (born 1978), Turkish-Belgian management scientist and operations researcher
