= Tolkien's round world dilemma =

Aspect of J.R.R. Tolkien's legendarium

J. R. R. Tolkien came to feel that the flat earth cosmology he embodied in his legendarium would be unacceptable to a modern readership. In The Silmarillion, Earth was created flat and was changed to round as a cataclysmic event during the Second Age in order to prevent direct access by Men to Valinor, home of the immortals. In the Round World Version, Earth is spherical from the beginning.

Tolkien abandoned the Round World Version before completing The Lord of the Rings, but later regretted this decision. He created a Round World Version, "The Drowning of Anadûnê", of the Akallabêth, the central story of the submerging of Númenor. He felt unable to proceed with it because the Flat World version was so deeply embedded in his mythology, with vitally important symbols like the Two Trees of Valinor which were difficult to fit in a Round World Version. He never resolved the dilemma, continuing to redraft his published works to make them compatible with a round world version for most of the rest of his life.

His son Christopher, editing The Silmarillion which he published after Tolkien's death, considered adjusting the text to comply with Tolkien's wish to return to the Round World Version. He decided against doing that, not least because the Akallabêth relies intrinsically on the Flat World cosmology.

Scholars have given at least three possible reasons why Tolkien should have felt the need for the drastic change to his mythology. Firstly, Tolkien believed that the Númenóreans would understand that a flat Earth was impossible, and so would not have passed on a story about it. Secondly, he felt that ordinary readers would find it impossible to suspend their disbelief in a flat earth with a little sun and moon that were respectively a glowing fruit and flower from magical trees. Thirdly, his attitude seems to have shifted from feeling comfortable with mythology to wanting Middle-earth to be realistically historical.

== History ==
An early stage in the Flat World Version of Tolkien's cosmology, complete with two enormous lamps, fixed on tall pillars, that gave the world its light.

Tolkien gives the fullest account of the creation myth in the Ainulindalë ("Music of the Ainur"). He wrote the original version in the 1930s, calling it the "Flat World Version", or later the "Old Flat World Version" after he had created a new flat world version. In 1946 he wrote the "Round World Version", intending this to be the published version. Tolkien sent both the "Old Flat World Version" and the "Round World Version" to Katharine Farrer (mystery novelist and wife of the theologian Austin Farrer) for review in 1948. Farrer replied to him in October, strongly supporting the Flat World Version – "The hope of Heaven is the only thing which makes modern astronomy tolerable". Farrer seems to have influenced Tolkien to abandon the Round World Version, which he did before completing The Lord of the Rings, or even starting its last volume, The Return of the King. Tolkien created a new manuscript from a heavily edited Old Flat World Version. (Note: Tolkien 1993, Ainulindalë) He then produced a final polished Round World manuscript with illuminated capitals.

Timeline
Date	Event
1930s	Flat World Version
1946	Round World Ainulindalë
1948?	Round World Akallabêth
late 1950s–1973	Round World edits in various Silmarillion materials
1966	Round World edits in 3rd ed. of The Hobbit
1977	Christopher Tolkien's heavily edited Flat World Ainulindalë in The Silmarillion

No version of the Ainulindalë was published during Tolkien's lifetime, but a heavily edited version later formed the first chapter of the 1977 The Silmarillion edited by Tolkien's son Christopher. The earliest version (named "The Music of the Ainur", not Ainulindalë) was published in 1984 in The Book of Lost Tales volume 1. (Note: Tolkien 1984, "The Music of the Ainur") The Old Flat World Version was included in the 1987 The Lost Road and Other Writings. Both the Round World Version and the New Flat World Version were included in the 1993 Morgoth's Ring. (Note: Tolkien 1993, "The Later Quenta Silmarillion") The latter is a more faithful reproduction of Tolkien's manuscript than the edited version in The Silmarillion.

Tolkien wrote a Round World Version of the Akallabêth, possibly in 1948 to match the Ainulindalë Round World Version. The Akallabêth is an Atlantis-like story of the destruction of the island of Númenor, brought about by Sauron's deception of its people. In the Flat World Akallabêth, this geographic change is part of the transition from flat to round world, effectively explaining how the world was flat in the First Age, but is round now. Like the Ainulindalë, the Akallabêth was not published during Tolkien's lifetime, but it was included in The Silmarillion. (Note: Tolkien 1977, Akallabêth)

Tolkien continued incorporating the Round World Versions into his later Middle-earth writings. In 1960–61, Tolkien invented heraldic devices for his characters, including a "Winged Sun" for Finwë. This presupposes the Round World version, as in the Flat World version the Sun does not exist until after Finwë's death. He mentioned a Round World cosmology in a BBC interview in 1964, during which he briefly discussed the drowning of Númenor. In the third edition of The Hobbit (published in 1966), he altered the text to have the Wood-elves lingering in the twilight of the Sun, implying a Round World, instead of lingering in the twilight before the raising of the Sun, as would be the case in a Flat World.

== In-universe description ==
In the Flat World Version of Tolkien's cosmology, the downfall of Númenor was tied to the reshaping of the world from flat to round, making the purely Round World version problematic. (Note: Carpenter 2023, letter 154 to Naomi Mitchison, 25 September 1954) Shapes of continents are purely schematic.

Christopher Tolkien described the Round World Version as "de-mythologised", as it abolishes many elements of Tolkien's mythology. As well as removing the flat Earth, it abolishes the need for the Sun and Moon to be transported by mythical beings. Also gone are the two enormous lamps that light the Earth before the creation of the Sun: the Sun shines from the beginning. In the Round World Version, the Earth has always been round, and Arda is the name for the whole solar system, not just the Earth. The Sun and the Moon are not the fruit of the Two Trees, but preceded the creation of the Trees. Instead, the Trees preserved the light of the Sun before it was tainted by Melkor. In some of the Round World texts, the Moon is created from part of the Earth: Christopher Tolkien considers this a further piece of de-mythologising, since this is in accordance with the scientific paradigm.

In the Round World Akallabêth, the Earth is in fact round from the beginning, and the Elves teach the Númenóreans that it is so; but one of Sauron's deceptions is to tell the Númenóreans that it is flat. As a result, when the survivors of the Downfall explore the Earth in search of their lost home, thus finding proof that the world is round, they then believe that it had been made so only after Númenor was drowned. (Note: Tolkien 1992, "The Drowning of Anadûnê") During the Downfall, Valinor is not removed from the physical world (as in the Flat World version); instead, its landmass simply becomes America. It is instead those who dwell there, the Valar and the Elves, who since the Downfall live only in memory: thus the End of Arda is moved ahead by Eru, as far as the Elves are concerned. (Note: Tolkien 2021, "The Númenórean Catastrophe & End of “Physical” Aman", pp. 343–345)

According to the in-universe transmission, the legends of the Silmarillion would be passed down through Númenor. Thus, the actual stories as transmitted are "blended and confused"; they arise from Mannish mythology and cosmology. (Note: Tolkien 1993, "Myths Transformed") (Note: Carpenter 2023, letter 325 to Roger Lancelyn Green, 17 July 1971) The Elves, on the other hand, already had a picture of the world at Cuiviénen, according to which not only the Sun and Moon, but even Venus (later mythologically called Eärendil), existed already at that time. (Note: Tolkien 2021, "Dark and Light")

== Tolkien's dilemma ==
=== An internal problem: impossible to the Númenóreans ===
According to the lawyer and author on Tolkien Douglas Kane, the fundamental problem Tolkien had with the Flat World Version was that the Númenóreans, the ancestors of Men, were the means by which the legends of the earliest days were transmitted to later generations. Tolkien believed that the Númenóreans would understand that a flat Earth was impossible.

=== An external problem: incredible to the ordinary reader ===
The Tolkien scholar John D. Rateliff takes a different view of the problem, writing that Tolkien had changed his mind about what an ordinary reader would be able to believe, or the extent to which that reader might be able to suspend their disbelief, in the face of a medieval cosmology. Rateliff wrote that

Tolkien had come to believe that the average reader's astronomical knowledge by the middle of the twentieth century was sufficient that the idea of a flat earth—circled by a little sun and moon that were glowing fruits and flowers from magical trees carried in flying boats, each of which, steered by an angel, sails in the sky from east to west before travelling back beneath the earth by night—simply [wouldn't] do.

Christopher Tolkien wrote in Morgoth's Ring that his father had decided to reconstruct his mythology to a Round World model because he had

come to believe that such a vast upheaval was a necessity, that the cosmos of the old myth was no longer valid; and at the same time he was impelled to try to construct a more secure 'theoretical' or 'systematic' basis for elements in the legendarium that were not to be dislodged.

— Christopher Tolkien, Morgoth's Ring

=== A change in attitude ===
The Inklings scholar David Bratman identifies a third possible reason for moving to a Round World model: that "Tolkien's attitude to his creation" had shifted. He suggests that Tolkien had grown "more analytical with details in general", giving as example the work he did late in his life, documented in The Nature of Middle-earth, in which he laboriously compares the Elvish and human life cycles. Bratman describes as an "absolutely crushing moment" the time when Tolkien made up his mind that

his beautiful mythological image of Valinor being separated from the mortal lands when the shape of the world was changed was not feasible—what happened to it physically? So it must have lost its Valinorian magic and become America.

— David Bratman, "Notes of an Inklings Scholar" (Note: Tolkien 2021, p. 343)

In Bratman's view, the cause of this change was that he had gradually and perhaps unwittingly turned the mythological legendarium into an annalistic history "modeled on the Anglo-Saxon Chronicles". The further back the exact historical dates went, the more acute the crisis became; and the dates could go very far back into what had been vague mythological time, because Elves like Elrond could remember events thousands of years before the events of the War of the Ring. And Tolkien had written The Lord of the Rings in a far more modern style than the Silmarillion, supported by extensive "historical" Appendices including exact chronologies.

Bratman's analysis, after Rilstone, of the evolution of Tolkien's attitude
Period	Approach	Example
Early	"purely mythological"	The Book of Lost Tales "when Beren was an Elf, Sauron was a cat and minstrels had names like Tinfang Warble"
Middle	"mixed mythological-historical"	The Lord of the Rings, and its "historical" Appendices, complete with dates
Late	"purely historical and scientific"	"the only partially sketched" Round World version

=== The horns of the dilemma ===
The Flat World Version, Tolkien had come to feel, was thus essentially unacceptable, whether internally or externally, requiring replacement. But the story of the submerging of Númenor relies intrinsically on this cosmology. Many other dramatic moments would be lost or need serious revision to make a Round World Version consistent across all of the works in the Middle-earth legendarium. Among the tales that would need revising is the story of the Two Trees. Matthew Dickerson calls these "the most important mythic symbols in all of the legendarium".

The Round World Version thus represents a major, concrete part of Tolkien's attempt to entirely rewrite the mythology of Middle-earth. Rateliff comments that Tolkien had an "extremely good" grasp of the "cascading effects" of making such a change in his legendarium; and that this change was uniquely awkward, as it stood at the junction of the myths from Valinor and the legends of Beleriand. Tolkien saw that he would have to rewrite the early tales that set out his cosmology, and stop work on the legends until the cosmology had been made fully consistent. In Rateliff's view, Tolkien "became convinced that he had to make changes he simply couldn't bring himself to make" and became stuck; this problem was compounded by his publisher's rejection of The Silmarillion in 1951. Even if Tolkien could have resolved one of these issues, Rateliff writes, the two together "probably" ensured that no version of The Silmarillion would be published in his lifetime.

Tolkien gave the Round World Version of the Akallabêth the name The Drowning of Anadûnê; this was eventually published in Sauron Defeated in 1992. He described this as the "Man's version", possibly to distinguish it from the Elvish version in the Akallabêth, and to reconcile why there are two versions in the legendarium. Despite his desire to abandon or heavily revise the Flat World Version, he found himself unable to do so, as it was already too deeply embedded in the universe he had created. Tolkien was attempting, but failing, to reinforce the sense of believability in his mythology by bringing it more into line with scientific knowledge of the history of the Earth.

Patrick Curry argued in 2013 that the Round World Version generated as many problems as it solved, such as where the earthly paradise of Valinor might now be placed – though Tolkien's own solution to this problem was only published in 2014. Carl Hostetter added that Tolkien's solution appears to contradict The Lord of the Rings, in which Frodo journeys to what appears to be a "very physical" Tol Eressëa. The Tolkien scholar Verlyn Flieger described the attempt as "a 180% [sic] turn", citing Christopher Tolkien's description of it, "'a fearful weapon' against his own creation".

In Christopher Tolkien's view, his father's manuscripts reveal a tension or "stress" between the need for the new model, and the difficulty of such a fundamental reconstruction of the mythology:

With their questionings, their certainties giving way to doubt, their contradictory resolutions, these writings are to be read with a sense of [Tolkien's] intellectual and imaginative stress in the face of such a dismantling and reconstitution, believed to be an inescapable necessity, but never achieved.

— Christopher Tolkien, Morgoth's Ring

Kristine Larsen likens Tolkien's struggles to reconcile cosmology with his mythology to the Renaissance astronomer Tycho Brahe's attempts to reconcile his observations with his model of the Solar System. She quotes Christopher Tolkien's description of his father's struggles as "a prolonged interior debate", and his judgement that:

It may be ... that he came to perceive from such experimental writing as this text that the old structure was too comprehensive, too interlocked in all its parts, indeed its roots too deep, to withstand such a devastating surgery.

— Christopher Tolkien, Morgoth's Ring

In Larsen's view, Tolkien was neither able to "ignore the simple logic of a heliocentric cosmology", nor to switch over to it "as it would break much of what was so poetic in his fictional cosmology."

Kristine Larsen's analysis of Tolkien's "prolonged interior debate"
Original principles to be retained	Modern cosmology to be reflected
Arda is flat; Arda is "our planet".	Earth as a "planet orbiting the Sun in space"
Light of the Two Trees of Valinor	Earth as a "planet orbiting the Sun in space"
Treat "Sun and Moon as lesser lights" inferior to that of the Trees	Earth as a "planet orbiting the Sun in space"
Centrality of the Silmarils (containing light of the Two Trees)	Earth as a "planet orbiting the Sun in space"

However, Christopher Tolkien also pointed out in Morgoth's Ring that the Round World version was referred to in his father's commentary to the Athrabeth Finrod ah Andreth, as well as incorporated into his last work on Chapter 6 of the Silmarillion. In the two further volumes of The History of Middle-earth that he released, he pointed out further references to the Round World and its associated transmission framework in several late texts: the 1959–60 text Quendi and Eldar, (Note: Tolkien 1994, "Quendi and Eldar", editorial notes 6 and 29) the c. 1963 text Of the Ents and the Eagles, (Note: Tolkien 1994, "Of the Ents and the Eagles") the c. 1968 The Shibboleth of Fëanor (Note: Tolkien 1996, "The Shibboleth of Fëanor", note 17) and The Problem of Ros, (Note: Tolkien 1996, "The Problem of Ros", note 21) and the c. 1972–73 Glorfindel II. (Note: Tolkien 1996, "Last Writings", note 17) Carl Hostetter, in his editorial comments to the late 1960s text Dark and Light presented in The Nature of Middle-earth (discussing Elvish conceptions of astronomy before they met the Valar), also noted that the Round World changes were "obviously long-lived". Douglas Kane also considered the Of the Ents and the Eagles reference as being "of particular interest", even though he agreed with Christopher Tolkien's decision to use a Flat World for the published Silmarillion.

In 2024 Vyacheslav Stepanov, writing in Palantir, the journal of the St. Petersburg Tolkien Society, pointed to such examples and added that the Round World was incorporated into the narratives as late as the c. 1972–73 text Círdan. Considering the extended period over which these revisions were made, right up to the year of Tolkien's death, Stepanov argued that Tolkien had in fact solved the problem to his satisfaction and decided in favour of the Round World.

== Choice for The Silmarillion ==
While preparing The Silmarillion for its 1977 publication, Christopher Tolkien was aware that his father had intended to update it to a new Round World Version. He considered editing the manuscripts to comply with this wish. In other respects, he had edited the stories to make them internally self-consistent, and consistent with the already published canon. He later published several edited versions of his father's Silmarillion stories in the 12-volume The History of Middle-earth.

Christopher decided against such a cosmological update for several reasons. What his father had left of the Round World Silmarillion was no more than an outline of his intentions. The earlier Round World Version was no longer viable, because by this stage it differed too greatly from already published works. The Silmarillion would either need major rework, or the change would have to be allowed to introduce new inconsistencies.

Kristine Larsen argues that Christopher's "uncharacteristically scant" commentary on the Round World revisions in Morgoth's Ring is related to his own rejection of that cosmology. While she agrees with Christopher that the Flat World cosmology is "beautiful", she nonetheless finds it "unfortunate" that these cosmological reworkings did not receive a full analysis. She points to various astronomical implications of the Round World texts (including the possible existence of extraterrestrial life in the legendarium) that Christopher did not comment on.

== See also ==
- The Science of Discworld II: The Globe
- Tolkien's moral dilemma – another dilemma that Tolkien never resolved, on the nature of Orcs and evil

== Sources ==
- Bratman, David (2022). "Notes of an Inklings Scholar: Musings on Myth and History, Promises and Secrecy, Ethical Reviewing, and the Limits of Authorial Intent". Mythlore. 41 (1). Article 2.
- Carpenter, Humphrey, ed. (2023) [1981]. The Letters of J. R. R. Tolkien: Revised and Expanded Edition. New York: HarperCollins. ISBN 978-0-35-865298-4.
- Curry, Patrick (2013) [2007]. "Earth". In Drout, Michael D. C. (ed.). J.R.R. Tolkien Encyclopedia. Routledge. pp. 138–139. ISBN 978-0-415-86511-1.
- Dickerson, Matthew (2013) [2007]. "Trees". In Drout, Michael D. C. (ed.). J.R.R. Tolkien Encyclopedia. Taylor & Francis. pp. 678–679. ISBN 978-0-415-96942-0.
- Flieger, Verlyn (2023). "'A Fearful Weapon'". Mythlore. 42 (1). Article 10.
- Garbowski, Christopher (2013) [2007]. "Middle-earth". In Drout, Michael D. C. (ed.). J.R.R. Tolkien Encyclopedia. Routledge. pp. 422–428. ISBN 978-0-415-86511-1.
- Gueroult, Denys; Tolkien, J. R. R. (1964). "J. R. R. Tolkien". BBC Radio 4: Author Archive Collection.
- Hammond, Wayne G.; Scull, Christina (1998) [1995]. "6. Patterns and Devices". J. R. R. Tolkien: Artist and Illustrator. HarperCollins. pp. 187–198. ISBN 978-0-261-10360-3.
- Kane, Douglas Charles (2009). Arda Reconstructed: The Creation of the Published Silmarillion. Associated University Presses. ISBN 978-0-9801496-3-0.
- Larsen, Kristine (2021). "The Walls of the World and the Voyages of the Evening Star: The Byzantine Borders of Tolkien's Biblical/Classical/Medieval/Geocentric/Heliocentric Complicated Cosmology". Journal of Tolkien Research. 13 (1). Article 3.
- Larsen, Kristine (2023). "The Sun, the Son, and the Silmarillion: Christopher Tolkien and the Copernican Revolution of Morgoth's Ring". Mythlore. 42 (1): 173–179.
- Larsen, Kristine (2024). "A Medievalist Myth-making Crisis: Tolkien's Tychonic Cosmology". Journal of Tolkien Research. 19 (1). Article 7.
- Nagy, Gergely (2013) [2007]. "Silmarillion, The". In Drout, Michael D. C. (ed.). J.R.R. Tolkien Encyclopedia. Routledge. pp. 608–612. ISBN 978-0-415-86511-1.
- Rateliff, John D. (2020). "The flat Earth made round and Tolkien's failure to finish The Silmarillion". Journal of Tolkien Research. 9 (1).
- Rilstone, Andrew (16 November 2021). "The Nature of Middle-earth". The Life and Opinions of Andrew Rilstone. Archived from the original on 24 April 2024.
- Shippey, Tom (2005) [1982]. The Road to Middle-Earth: How J. R. R. Tolkien Created a New Mythology (Third ed.). HarperCollins. ISBN 978-0-261-10275-0.
- Stepanov, Vyacheslav (2024). "«Он всегда был огромным шаром…»" ["It Always Had Been a Vast Globe..."]. Палантир [Palantir] (in Russian). 90. Толкиновское Общество СПб [St Petersburg Tolkien Society]: 13–18.
  - Translated into English (and expanded by the author) as Stepanov, Vyacheslav (14 April 2024). ""It Always Had Been a Vast Globe..."". RealElvish.net - Merin Essi ar Quenteli!.
- Tolkien, J. R. R. (1977). Christopher Tolkien (ed.). The Silmarillion. Boston: Houghton Mifflin. ISBN 978-0-395-25730-2.
- Tolkien, J. R. R. (1984). Christopher Tolkien (ed.). The Book of Lost Tales. Vol. 1. Boston: Houghton Mifflin. ISBN 0-395-35439-0.
- Tolkien, J. R. R. (1992). Christopher Tolkien (ed.). Sauron Defeated. Boston, New York, & London: Houghton Mifflin. ISBN 0-395-60649-7.
- Tolkien, J. R. R. (1993). Christopher Tolkien (ed.). Morgoth's Ring. Boston: Houghton Mifflin. Ainulindalë. ISBN 0-395-68092-1.
- Tolkien, J. R. R. (1994). Christopher Tolkien (ed.). The War of the Jewels. Boston: Houghton Mifflin. ISBN 0-395-71041-3.
- Tolkien, J. R. R. (1996). Christopher Tolkien (ed.). The Peoples of Middle-earth. Boston: Houghton Mifflin. ISBN 978-0-395-82760-4.
- Tolkien, J. R. R. (2021). Carl F. Hostetter (ed.). The Nature of Middle-earth. London: HarperCollins. ISBN 978-0-00-838792-1.
- Tolkien, J. R. R. (2002). Anderson, Douglas A. (ed.). The Annotated Hobbit. Boston: Houghton Mifflin Harcourt. ISBN 9780618134700.
- Tolkien, J. R. R. (2014). Devaux, Michaël; Tolkien, Christopher; Hostetter, Carl (eds.). "L'effigie des elfes". La Feuille de la Compagnie. 3.
- Whittingham, Elizabeth A. (2008). The Evolution of Tolkien's Mythology. McFarland & Company. ISBN 978-0-7864-3281-3.
