= Cosmology of Tolkien's legendarium =

Theme in J. R. R. Tolkien's writing

The fictional cosmology of J. R. R. Tolkien's legendarium combines aspects of Christian theology and metaphysics with pre-modern cosmological concepts in the flat Earth paradigm, along with the modern spherical Earth view of the Solar System.

The created world, Eä, includes the planet Arda, corresponding to the Earth. It is created flat, with the dwelling of the godlike Valar at its centre. When this is marred by the evil Vala Melkor, the world is reshaped, losing its perfect symmetry, and the Valar move to Valinor, but the Elves can still sail there from Middle-earth. When Men try to go there, hoping for immortality, Valinor and its continent of Aman are removed from Arda, which is reshaped as a round world. Scholars have compared the implied cosmology with that of Tolkien's religion, Catholicism, and of medieval poetry such as Pearl or Dante's Paradiso, where there are three parts, Earth, Purgatory or the Earthly Paradise, and Heaven or the Celestial Paradise. Scholars have debated the nature of evil in Middle-earth, arguing whether it is the absence of good (the Boethian position) or equally as powerful as good (the Manichaean view).

== Ontology ==
=== Creation and destruction ===
Eru is introduced in The Silmarillion as the supreme being of the universe, creator of everything, including the world, Arda, and its central continent, Middle-earth. In Tolkien's invented Elvish language Quenya, Eru means "The One", or "He that is Alone" and Ilúvatar signifies "Father of All". (Note: Tolkien 1977, pp. 329, 336, 356, 358) He is usually called Eru by Men, and Ilúvatar by Elves. (Note: Tolkien 1977, Valaquenta) Tolkien uses the name Eru for God in his Quenya versions of Christian prayers, e. g. in Aia María, (Hail Mary) where he translates Holy Mary, Mother of God as Aire María Eruo ontaril.

Eru first created a group of godlike or angelic beings, the Ainur, consisting of the powerful Valar and their assistants, the Maiar. These assisted in the creation of the universe through a holy music and chanting called the Ainulindalë or "Music of the Ainur". (Note: Tolkien 1977, Ainulindalë)

I am a servant of the Secret Fire, wielder of the flame of Anor. You cannot pass. The dark fire will not avail you, flame of Udûn. Go back to the shadow! You cannot pass.

— Gandalf, speaking to the Balrog (Note: Tolkien 1954a book 2, chapter 5, "The Bridge of Khazad-dûm")

Tolkien stated that the "Flame Imperishable" or "Secret Fire" represents the Holy Spirit in Christian theology, the creative activity of Eru, inseparable both from him and from his creation. In the interpretation of Christopher Tolkien, it represents "the mystery of authorship", the author both standing outside of his work and indwelling in it. In the First Age, Eru alone created Elves and Men, the "Children of Ilúvatar". (Note: Tolkien 1977, chapter 1, "Of the Beginning of Days") The race of the Dwarves was created by Aulë, a powerful Vala, and given sapience by Eru. (Note: Tolkien 1977, chapter 2, "Of Aulë and Yavanna") Animals and plants were fashioned by Yavanna during the Music of the Ainur after the themes set out by Eru.

Arda ends in the apocalyptic battle of Dagor Dagorath, which Tolkien stated owed something to the Norse myth of Ragnarök. (Note: Carpenter 2023, #131 to Milton Waldman, late 1951)

=== Eru's direct interventions ===
In the Second Age, Eru buried King Ar-Pharazôn of Númenor and his army when they invaded Aman, trying to reach the Undying Lands, which they wrongly supposed would give them immortality. He caused the Earth to take a spherical shape, drowned Númenor, and caused the Undying Lands to be taken "outside the spheres of the earth". When Gandalf died in the fight with the Balrog in The Fellowship of the Ring, it was beyond the power of the Valar to resurrect him; Eru himself intervened to send Gandalf back. (Note: Carpenter 2023, #156 to R. Murray, S.J., November 1954)

Discussing Frodo's failure to destroy the Ring in The Return of the King, Tolkien indicates in a letter that "the One" does intervene actively in the world, pointing to Gandalf's remark to Frodo that "Bilbo was meant to find the Ring, and not by its maker", and to the eventual destruction of the Ring despite Frodo's failure to complete the task. (Note: Carpenter 2023, #192 to Amy Ronald, December 1956)

=== Fëa and hröa ===
Fëa and hröa are the "soul" and "body" of Elves and Men. Their hröa is made out of the matter of Arda; for this reason hröar are marred or, as Tolkien wrote, contain a "Melkor ingredient". (Note: Tolkien 1993, p. 400) When an Elf dies, the fëa leaves the hröa, which then dies. The fëa is summoned to the Halls of Mandos in Valinor, where it is judged; however, as with death, their free will is not taken away, and they could refuse the summons. (Note: Tolkien 1993, p. 339) If allowed by Mandos, the fëa may be re-embodied into a new body identical to the previous hröa. The situation of Men is different: a Mannish fëa is only a visitor to Arda, and when the hröa dies, the fëa, after a brief stay in Mandos, leaves Arda completely.

=== Unseen world ===
In The Lord of the Rings, Tolkien justifies the nature of the Ring by explaining that Elves and other immortal beings dwell in "both worlds" at once (the physical and the spiritual, or Unseen world) and have great power in both, especially those who have dwelt in the light of the Two Trees of Valinor before there was a Sun or Moon. The powers associated with 'magic' were spiritual in nature. (Note: Tolkien 1954a book 2, chapter 1, "Many Meetings". "you saw him for a moment as he [is] upon the other side: [...] for those who have dwelt in the Blessed Realm live at once in both worlds, and against both the Seen and the Unseen they have great power.") (Note: Tolkien 1954a book 2, chapter 7, "The Mirror of Galadriel". "yet if you succeed, then our power is diminished, and Lothlórien will fade, and the tides of Time will sweep it away. We must depart into the West, or dwindle to a rustic folk of dell and cave, slowly to forget and to be forgotten.")

The Elves who stayed in Middle-earth where Melkor once was dominant, being in bodies and surrounded by things that are themselves marred and subject to decay by the influence of Melkor, created the Elven Rings out of a desire to preserve the physical world unchanged; as if it were in the Undying Lands of Valinor, home of the Valar. Without the rings they are destined to eventually "fade", eventually becoming shadows in the physical world, prefiguring the concept of Elves as dwelling in a separate and often-underground (or overseas) plane in historical European mythology.

Mortals who wear a Ring of Power are destined to "fade" more rapidly, as the rings unnaturally preserve their life-span, turning them into wraiths. Invisibility is a side effect of this, as the wearer is temporarily drawn into the spirit world. (Note: Tolkien 1954a book 1, chapter 2, "The Shadow of the Past". "if [a mortal] often uses the Ring to make himself invisible, he fades: he becomes in the end invisible permanently, and walks in the twilight under the eye of the dark power that rules the Rings.") (Note: Tolkien 1954a book 2, chapter 1, "Many Meetings". "You were in gravest peril while you wore the Ring, for then you were half in the wraith-world yourself.")

=== Men, Elves, and Paradise ===
Men live only in the world (Arda), are able to die from it, have souls, and may ultimately go to a kind of Heaven, though this is left vague in the legendarium. The case of Elves is different. They may inhabit the "undying lands" of Valinor, home of the Valar, effectively, according to the Tolkien scholar Tom Shippey, an "Earthly Paradise" as envisaged for Elves in the Middle English South English Legendary. Other Elves are in Middle-earth; the Elf-queen Galadriel indeed is expelled from Valinor, much like the fallen Melkor, though she is clearly good, and much like an angel. Shippey considers whether Elves have souls. He reasons that, since they are unable to leave the world, the answer must be no; but, given that they do not disappear completely on death, the answer must be yes. In Shippey's view, the Silmarillion resolves the puzzle, letting Elves go not to Heaven but to the halfway house of the Halls of Mandos on Valinor. The problem arises again with apparently wholly evil beings such as Orcs. Since evil cannot make, only mock, Orcs cannot have an equal and opposite morality to that of Men; but since they speak and have a moral sense (though they are unable to keep to it), they are neither wholly evil nor lacking sentience. All of this implies, as various scholars have commented, a hierarchy of races comparable with the Medieval great chain of being.

Hierarchy of beings
Tolkien	Catholicism / Medieval world
Eru, the creator	God
Valar, immortal, participating in the creation	Angels (or pantheon of Norse gods)
Fallen Vala, Melkor	Fallen Angel, Satan
Elves ("functionally immortal")	
Men (mortal)	Men (with souls)
Orcs (possibly evil)	
Beasts	Animals (no soul)

Several scholars have likened the implied cosmology of Tolkien's legendarium to that of his religion, Roman Catholicism, and that of Medieval poetry.

Cosmology of Tolkien's legendarium compared to Catholicism and Medieval poetry
Tolkien	Catholicism	Pearl, Dante's Paradiso
"that which is beyond Elvenhome and will ever be" (Note: Tolkien 1955, book 6, chapter 4, "The Field of Cormallen")	Heaven	Celestial Paradise, "beyond"
Undying lands of Aman, Elvenhome in Valinor	Purgatory	Earthly Paradise, Garden of Eden
Middle-earth	Earth	Earth

=== Evil in Middle-earth ===
Tolkien used the first part of The Silmarillion, the Ainulindalë or creation account, to describe his thoughts on the origin of evil in his fictional world, which he took pains to comport with his own beliefs on the subject, as accounted in his Letters.

In the Ainulindalë, evil represents a rebellion against the creative process set in motion by Eru. Evil is defined by its original actor, Melkor, a Luciferian figure who falls from grace in active rebellion against Eru, out of a desire to create and control things of his own. Melkor creates Orcs in mockery of Elves, or by corrupting Elves he had captured in his northern Middle-earth fortress of Udûn. (Note: Tolkien 1977, chapter 3, "Of the Coming of the Elves and the Captivity of Melkor")

Shippey writes that Tolkien's Middle-earth writings embody the ancient Christian debate on the nature of evil. Shippey notes Elrond's Boethian statement that "nothing is evil in the beginning. Even [the Dark Lord] Sauron was not so", (Note: Tolkien 1954a, book 2, chapter 2, "The Council of Elrond") in other words all things were created good; but this is set alongside the Manichean view that good and evil are equally powerful, and battle it out in the world. Tolkien's personal war experience was Manichean: evil seemed at least as powerful as good, and could easily have been victorious, a strand which Shippey notes can also be seen in Middle-earth. Brian Rosebury, a humanities scholar, interprets Elrond's statement as implying an Augustinian universe, created good.

== The physical universe ==
=== Flat-earth cosmology ===
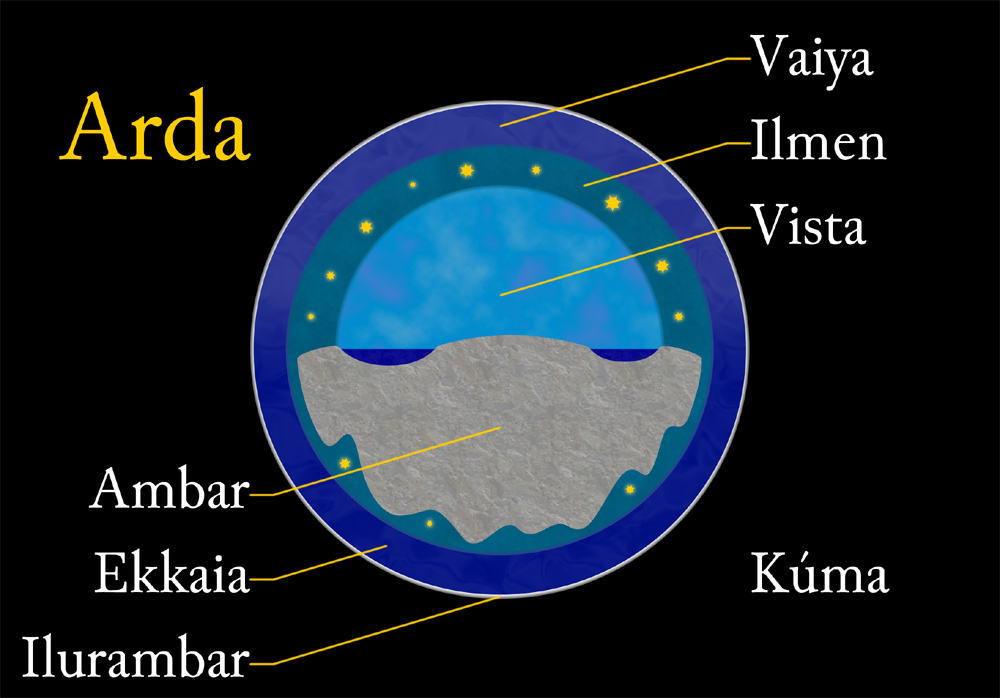
Sketch of one of Tolkien's conceptions of Arda within the Void, Kúma, showing the Encircling Ocean, Ekkaia, around the Flat Earth, Ambar, the Air, Vista, and the Starry Heaven, Ilmen, before the creation of Sun and Moon.

Arda as a flat disc in the Years of the Lamps

Eä, "that which is", is the material universe as a realisation of the vision of the Ainur. The Quenya word is from the existential to be in its aorist form. Eä was the word spoken by Eru Ilúvatar to bring the universe into actuality.

The Void (Kúma, the Outer Dark) is the nothingness outside Arda. From Arda, it is accessible through the Doors of Night. The Valar exiled Melkor to the Void after his defeat in the War of Wrath. Legend foretells that Melkor will return to Arda just before the apocalyptic battle of Dagor Dagorath. The void is not to be confused with the state of non-being that preceded the creation of Eä. (Note: Tolkien 1993, "Myths Transformed", section VII)

When Arda (the Earth) was created, "innumerable stars" were already in existence. To provide greater light, the Valar later created the Two Lamps in Middle-earth, and when these were destroyed they created the Two Trees of Valinor. These gave rise to the Ages of the Lamps and the Years of the Trees; however, the Ages of the Stars did not conclude until the creation of the Sun and Moon. (Note: Tolkien 1977, ch. 13 "Of the Return of the Noldor") During the Years of the Trees, shortly before the Awakening of the Elves, Varda created the Great Stars: "new stars and brighter" and constellations.

Ilúvatar created Arda according to a flat Earth cosmology. This disc-like Arda has continents and the seas, and the moon and the stars revolve around it. Arda was created to be the "Habitation" (Ambar) for Elves and Men. This world was lit by two lamps created by the Valar: Illuin ('Sky-blue') and Ormal ('High-gold'). To support the lamps, Aulë forged two enormous pillars of rock: Helcar in the north of the continent Middle-earth, and Ringil in the south. Illuin was set upon Helcar and Ormal upon Ringil. Between the columns, where the light of the lamps mingled, the Valar dwelt on the island of Almaren in the midst of a Great Lake. When Melkor destroyed the lamps, two vast inland seas (Helcar and Ringil) and two major seas (Belegaer and the Eastern Sea) were formed, but Almaren and its lake were destroyed. The Valar left Middle-earth, and went to the newly formed continent of Aman in the west, where they created their home called Valinor. To discourage Melkor from assailing Aman, they thrust the continent of Middle-earth to the east, thus widening Belegaer at its middle, and raising five major mountain ranges in Middle-earth: the Blue, Red, Grey, and Yellow Mountains, plus the Mountains of the Wind. This act disrupted the symmetrical shapes of the continents and seas. (Note: Tolkien 1977, chapter 11, "Of the Sun and Moon and the Hiding of Valinor")

Ekkaia, also called the Enfolding Ocean and the Encircling Sea, is a dark sea that surrounds the world before the cataclysm at the end of the Second Age. During this flat-Earth period, Ekkaia flows completely around Arda, which floats on it like a ship on a sea. Above Ekkaia is a layer of atmosphere. Ulmo the Lord of Waters dwells in Ekkaia, underneath Arda. Ekkaia is extremely cold; where its waters meet the waters of the ocean Belegaer on the northwest of Middle-earth, a chasm of ice is formed: the Helcaraxë. Ekkaia cannot support any ships except the boats of Ulmo. The Sun passes through Ekkaia on its way around the world, warming it as it passes. (Note: Tolkien 1977, chapter 11, "Of the Sun and Moon and the Hiding of Valinor")

Ilmen is a region of clean air pervaded by light, before the cataclysm at the end of the Second Age. The stars and other celestial bodies are in this region. The Moon passes through Ilmen on its way around the world, plunging down the Chasm of Ilmen on its return.

=== Spherical-earth cosmology ===
The Downfall of Númenor and the Changing of the World.
Aman is removed from Arda. (Note: "Actually in the imagination of this story we are now living on a physically round Earth. But the whole 'legendarium' contains a transition from a flat world [...] to a globe". Carpenter 2023, #154 to Naomi Mitchison, 25 September 1954)
Shapes of continents are purely schematic.

Tolkien imagined Arda as the Earth in the distant past. With the loss of all its peoples except Man, and the reshaping of the continents, all that is left of Middle-earth is a dim memory in folklore, legend, and old words.

Tolkien's legendarium addresses the spherical Earth paradigm by depicting a catastrophic transition from a flat to a spherical world, in which Aman, the continent where Valinor lay, was removed "from the circles of the world". The only remaining way to reach Aman was the so called Old Straight Road, a hidden route leaving Middle-earth's curvature through sky and space which was exclusively known and open to the Elves, who were able to navigate it with their ships.

This transition from a flat to a spherical Earth is at the centre of Tolkien's "Atlantis" legend. The Númenóreans, growing arrogant, tried to reach Valinor, thinking that being there would confer immortality; but Eru destroyed their island and reshaped the world to prevent Men from ever reaching it. Tolkien's unfinished The Lost Road suggests a sketch of the idea of historical continuity connecting the Elvish mythology of the First Age with the classical Atlantis myth, the Germanic migrations, Anglo-Saxon England and the modern period, presenting the Atlantis legend in Plato and other deluge myths as a "confused" account of the story of Númenor. The cataclysmic re-shaping of the world would have left its imprint on the cultural memory and collective unconscious of humanity, and even on the genetic memory of individuals. The "Atlantis" part of the legendarium explores the theme of the memory of a 'straight road' into the West, which now only exists in memory or myth, because the physical world has been changed. The Akallabêth says that the Númenóreans who survived the catastrophe sailed as far west as they could in search of their ancient home, but their travels only brought them around the world back to their starting points. (Note: Tolkien 1977, Akallabêth)

A few years after publishing The Lord of the Rings, in a note associated with the story "Athrabeth Finrod ah Andreth", Tolkien equated Arda with the Solar System; because Arda by this point consisted of more than one heavenly body, with Valinor on another planet, while the Sun and Moon were celestial objects in their own right.

=== Planets and constellations ===
Durin's emblem includes the "Seven Stars" of the Valacirca, which Tolkien identified as the Plough.

Tolkien developed a list of names and meanings called the Qenya Lexicon. Christopher Tolkien included extracts from this in an appendix to The Book of Lost Tales, with mentions of specific stars, planets, and constellations. The Sun was called Anor or Ur. (Note: Tolkien 1984, "The Coming of the Valar") (Note: Tolkien 1955 Tolkien defines Anor and Durin's Crown (under 'Star') in Index IV and Menelvagor and Ithil in Appendix E.I in the entries for 'H' and 'TH' consonant sounds respectively.) The Moon was called Ithil or Silmo. (Note: Tolkien, J. R. R. (1998). Gilson, Christopher; Hostetter, Carl F.; Wynne, Patrick H.; Smith, Arden R. (eds.). "Qenya Lexicon". Parma Eldalamberon. 12. This includes star names omitted from The Book of Lost Tales appendix, on its pages 35, 43, 63, and 82.) (Note: Tolkien 1955 Appendix E. I, TH) Eärendil's Star denotes the light of a Silmaril, set on Eärendil's ship Vingilot as it flew across the sky, identified as the planet Venus. The English use of the word "earendel" in the Old English poem Christ I was found by 19th century philologists to be some sort of bright star, and from 1914 Tolkien took this to mean the morning-star; he still thought so late in his life, in 1967. (Note: Tolkien 1984b, p. 266) The line éala éarendel engla beorhtast "Hail, Earendel, brightest of angels" was Tolkien's inspiration. Tolkien created Sindarin names for the other planets in the solar system, as recorded in Morgoth's Ring, but did not use these elsewhere. The names were Silindo for Jupiter, Carnil for Mars, Elemmire for Mercury, Luinil for Uranus, Lumbar for Saturn, and Nenar for Neptune. (Note: Tolkien 1993, Index) The Book of Lost Tales lists Morwen as a name for Jupiter. (Note: Tolkien 1984, Appendix, "Mornie")

A few individual stars have been identified as names of real stars, whether by Tolkien, his son Christopher, or by scholars. Tolkien indicates in "Three is Company" in The Fellowship of the Ring that Borgil is a red star which appears between Remmirath (the Pleiades) and before Menelvagor (Orion). Larsen and others write that Aldebaran is the only major red star to fit the description. Helluin (also Gil, Nielluin and Nierninwa) is the dog star, Sirius, while Morwinyon is Arcturus.

As with the planets, a few major constellations are named in the Legendarium, and can be equated with real constellations seen in the Northern hemisphere. Eksiqilta (also Ekta) is Orion's Belt. Menelvagor (also Daimord, Menelmacar, Mordo, Swordsman of the Sky, Taimavar, Taimondo, Telimbektar, Telimektar, Telumehtar) is Orion the hunter and was meant to represent Túrin Turambar. Remmirath (also Itselokte or Sithaloth), "the Netted Stars", is the Pleiades or Seven Sisters. Valacirca, "the Sickle of the Valar", (Note: Tolkien 1977, "Of the Coming of the Elves" (also Durin's Crown, Burning Briar, Edegil, Otselen, Seven Stars, Seven Butterflies, Silver Sickle, Timbridhil)) is Ursa Major (the Plough or Big Dipper) which Varda set in the Northern sky as a warning to Melkor. Wilwarin, meaning "Butterfly", is taken to be Cassiopeia.

== Analysis ==
=== Theological basis ===
In his 2020 book Tolkien's Cosmology, the scholar of English literature Sam McBride suggests a new category, "monotheistic polytheism", for the theological basis of Tolkien's cosmology, insofar as it combines a polytheistic pantheon with the Valar, Maiar, and beings such as Tom Bombadil, alongside an evidently monotheistic cosmos created by one god, Eru Ilúvatar. In his view, the Valar "cannot be reduced either to spirit-beings or earth-forces; they encompass both simultaneously". McBride shows how Eru's actions can be seen in the creation of the world (Eä) and the Valar through which he acts, and more ambiguously in the Third Age where the divine will is at most hinted at.

The theologian Catherine Madsen writes that Tolkien found it impossible to make his many drafts and revisions of The Silmarillion consistent with The Lord of the Rings, leaving it unpublished at his death. Its cosmology is glimpsed: she notes that the tale of Eärendil is recited, and it serves as background to Frodo and Sam's use of the Phial of Galadriel, which contains some of the light of Eärendil's star. In contrast, the creation myth of the Ainulindalë is not even mentioned in The Lord of the Rings, though she notes that it could have been: Beowulf offered a suitable model familiar to Tolkien, in the minstrel's telling of a creation story. By having The Lord of the Rings told from the hobbits' point of view, Madsen writes, cosmology is pushed still further into the background: the hobbits know even less of the Valar than Men do, and Eru is not mentioned at all.

=== Round world version ===
Scholars have noted that Tolkien seems in later life to have hesitated and drawn back from the flat earth cosmology of Arda in favour of a round world version, but that it was so deeply embedded in the entire Legendarium that recasting it in what Deirdre Dawson, writing in Tolkien Studies, calls "a more rational, scientifically plausible, global shape", proved unworkable.

The Tolkien scholar Janet Brennan Croft states in Mythlore that the races of Middle-earth, Hobbits, Men, Elves, and Dwarves, all believe that there is "a literal cosmological battle between Good and Evil", all expecting a "final cataclysmic battle". Readers may, she writes, consider interpreting the Ainulindalë metaphorically, so that Melkor's attempts to destroy Arda, "raising the valleys, throwing down the mountains, spilling the seas—could be read as a symbolic representation of geological forces", but there is no suggestion of this in the text.

== See also ==
- Tolkien's maps
