= H. Efsun Arda =

Turkish developmental and systems biologist

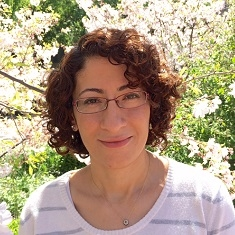
- Born: Hatice Efsun Arda
- Education: Boğaziçi University (BS); University of Massachusetts Medical School (PhD)
- Scientific career
- Fields: Developmental biology systems biology
- Workplaces: National Cancer Institute
- Thesis: C. Elegans Metabolic Gene Regulatory Networks (2010)
- Doctoral advisor: Marian Walhout

Hatice Efsun Arda is a Turkish developmental and systems biologist researching cell lineages that give rise to human pancreas using single cell sequencing. She is a Stadtman principal investigator and head of the developmental genomics group at the National Cancer Institute.

== Early life and education ==
Hatice Efsun Arda spent time with her mother, a nurse practitioner, at a hospital and in clinical laboratories. This early exposure encouraged her to study biology and medicine. Arda completed a B.S. in molecular biology and genetics at Boğaziçi University.

Arda obtained a Ph.D. in systems biology from the University of Massachusetts Medical School. During her doctorate training in the laboratory of Marian Walhout, she studied gene regulatory networks that pertain to the metabolism of the model organism, C. elegans. She uncovered a set of metabolic genes that are sensitive to the nutrient content of C. elegans bacterial diet.

=== Postdoctoral research ===
Interested in gene regulatory networks and developmental biology, Arda joined the laboratory of Seung K. Kim at Stanford University for her postdoctoral training. As a JDRF fellow, she developed cell sorting methods to purify primary pancreatic cells from children and adults, and used RNA sequencing to reveal hundreds of genes that are differentially regulated during the first 10 years of human lifespan, several of which are linked by association studies to diabetes risk. To understand how pancreatic cell type-specific gene expression programs are controlled at the genomic level, she then combined cell sorting with genomic techniques, like ATAC-Seq to delineate the regulatory chromatin landscape of human pancreatic cell types. This work revealed thousands of putative enhancer regions that explain cell type-specific gene expression in the human pancreas.

In 2016, Arda's research showed that the beta cells in the human pancreas continue their maturation after birth. Arda and colleagues examined the gene expression and chromatin profiles of pancreas cells isolated from children and adults and found specific gene-expression programs that are turned on after the age of 10. The study was the first to demonstrate these differences at a global level, and the team uncovered new factors potentially mediating this process.

To investigate genomic regulation, Arda continued to research the DNA elements that control pancreas-cell specification, identity, and function. Arda and co-authors and generated an atlas of genomic elements specific to the main cell types in the human pancreas. She identified unique regions in our genomes that control cell-type-specific gene expression in human pancreas cells. These regions also turned out to harbor more disease-risk variants associated with diabetes or pancreas cancer than other parts of the human genome.

== Career and research ==
Arda joined the National Institutes of Health in 2017 as a Stadtman principal investigator in the laboratory of receptor biology and gene expression at the National Cancer Institute. She is head of the developmental genomics group.

Arda's laboratory aims to delineate the gene regulatory networks that control the development, expansion and function of human pancreatic cells. Her research group combines genomic approaches with use of primary human cells, stem cell and genome-editing technologies to build maps of regulatory genomes governing the establishment and growth of human pancreatic cell lineages. Arda characterizes the cell lineages that give rise to human pancreas using single cell sequencing.
