= Arda Arsenian Ekmekji =

Lebanese Armenian scholar

- Born: 1951 (age 74–75); Jerusalem
- Education: American University of Beirut; University of Paris I-Panthéon-Sorbonne
- Occupations: Scholar, Dean of Arts and Sciences at Haigazian University
- Employer: Haigazian University
- Known for: Research on electoral reform, Prehistoric Armenia, and the Kingdom of Urartu
- Notable work: Confessionalism and Electoral Reform in Lebanon, Towards Golgotha

Arda Arsenian Ekmekji is a Lebanese Armenian scholar. She has been the dean of arts and sciences at Haigazian University since 1998, specialising in research on electoral reform, Prehistoric Armenia and the Kingdom of Urartu.

== Early life ==
Ekmekji was born in Jerusalem in 1951 and lived in Jordan until 1968. She is a holder of a Lebanese citizenship and currently resides in Beirut. She has a masters of arts degree in archaeology from the American University of Beirut (AUB) and a PhD in the same field from the University of Paris I-Pantheon- Sorbonne in Paris.

== Academic career ==
Ekmekji taught archaeology, ancient religions, civilizations and cultural studies at AUB for two decades before accepting a position at Haigazian University where she has served as the Dean of Arts and Sciences since 1998. She has also been a member of the National Commission for Electoral Reform (Boutros Commission 2006), Member of the Lebanese Supervisory Commission of Elections (2009, 2018).

Her research interests include electoral reform, Prehistoric Armenia and the Kingdom of Urartu. She also works on oral histories of the Armenian genocide and gender studies (with a focus on education). She published "Confessionalism and Electoral Reform in Lebanon" with the Aspen Institute in 2012. She published the memoirs of her grandfather, Hagop Arsenian, a survivor of the Armenian genocide, titled Towards Golgotha.

== Publications ==
- Towards Golgotha, The Memoirs of Hagop Arsenian, a Genocide Survivor. (HUP 2011, 2015).
- Confessionalism and Electoral Reform in Lebanon (The Aspen Institute, July 2012)
- Surviving Massacre: Hagop Arsenian's Armenian Journey to Jerusalem, 1915-1916 (Jerusalem Quarterly, Issue. 49, Spring 2012).
- Revisiting artin in Beirut: How Armenians are viewed in Lebanon (Lebanese American University, 2001).
- Les relations archéologiques entre les cités Urartéennes et les états du Nord de la Syrie entre le VIIIe et le VIe siècle [avant] [Jésus]-[Christ] , 1994- Paris I - Pantheon - Sorbonne
