= Arda (band) =

Russian band

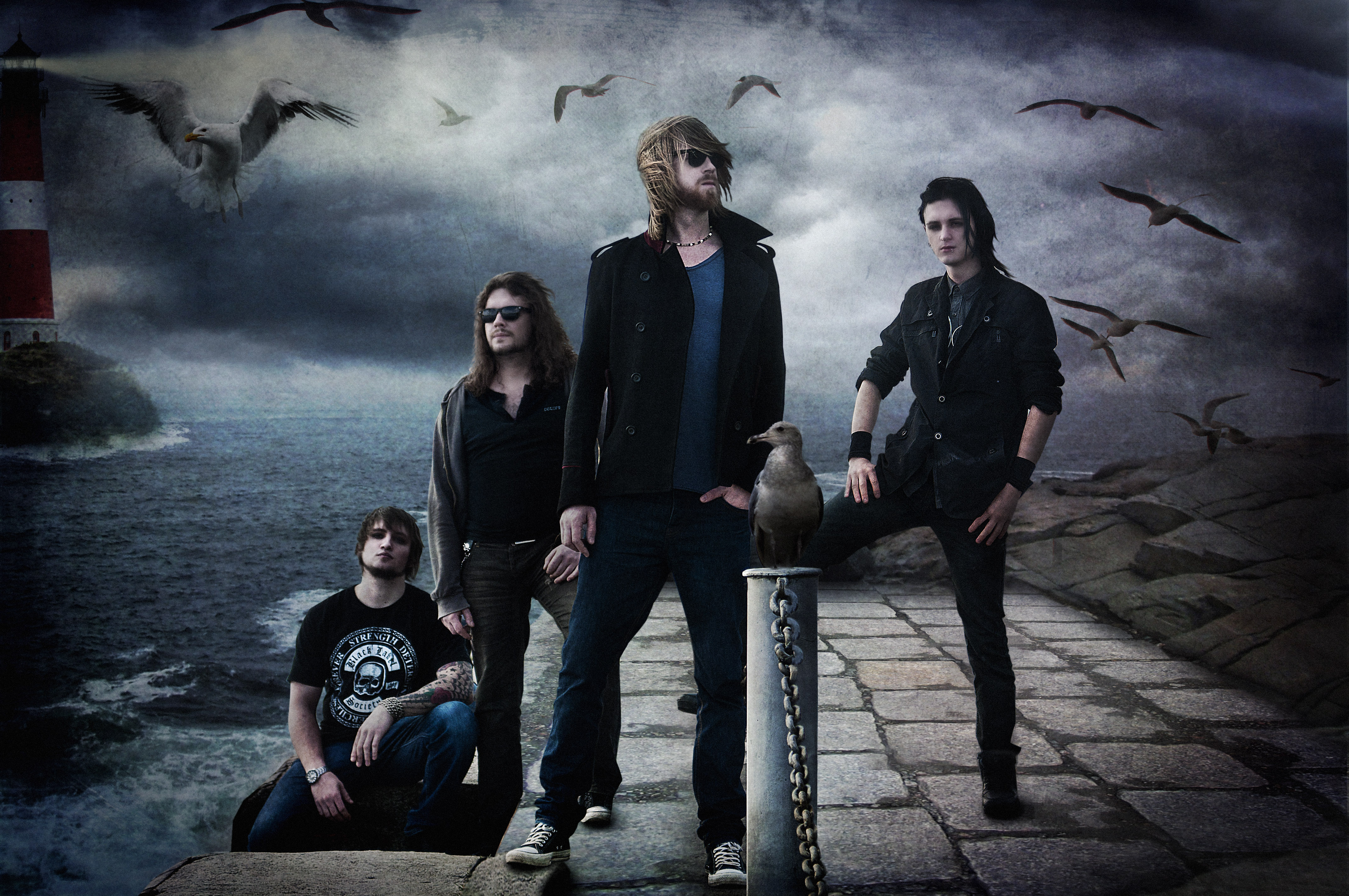
- Arda, 2013

Background information
- Origin: Russia
- Genres: Heavy metal
- Years active: 2000–present
- Spinoff of: Epidemia
- Members: Pavel Okunev, Mikhail Shaev, Anton Ginsburg, Karen Ter-Misropyan
- Website: http://arda.su

Arda (Russian: Арда) is a Russian heavy metal band that was formed in 2000 in Moscow, by vocalist Pavel Okunev (ex-Epidemia).

Band made its breakthrough releasing their debut album «О скитаниях вечных и о земле» (2004) and mini-album «Экзорцист» (2005), with popular songs Egzorcist, Taet sneg, Mrak, Pervaya zima, Net nikogo, Krilyataya tma, Radi zvezd and Tolyko pilj. In 2007 they released their next studio album called «Море исчезающих времён» followed by EP «В небо» in 2009 and EP «Холод» in 2010. In 2011 Pavel Okunev changed all bandmembers and with new cast released full-length albums "Там где земля становится морем" (2014) and "Северный Крест" (2017) and numerous singles and EP's: "Перерождение" (2011), "Полярная Звезда" (2013), "Мёртвая Вода" (2015) and "Экзорцист X" (2016)

== Band members ==
- Pavel Okunev - Lead vocals
- Mikhail Shaev - Guitar, back vocals
- Anton Ginsbourg - Bass guitar
- Karen Ter-Mesropyan - Guitar
- Den Zolotov - Drums

== Discography ==
- О скитаниях вечных и о земле (2004)
- Экзорцист (2005)
- Море исчезающих времён (2007)
- В небо EP (2009)
- Холод EP (2010)
- перерождение Single (2011)
- Полярная звезда EP (2013)
- Там где земля становится морем (2014)
- Мертвая Вода Single (2015)
- Экзорцист X EP (2016)
- Северный Крест (2017)
- Не Угаснет Надежда (2017)
