= Arda River (Douro tributary) =

River in northern Portugal

Coordinates: 41°02′56″N 08°22′38″W

The Arda River (Portuguese pronunciation: [ˈaɾðɐ]) is a river in Portugal. It flows into the Douro River. Arouca village is located near the Arda River.
