= Arda Denkel =

Turkish philosopher

- Born: 6 July 1949; Ankara
- Died: 21 May 2000; Istanbul, Turkey

Philosophical work
- Era: Contemporary philosophy
- Region: Western philosophy
- School: Analytic
- Main interests: Philosophy of language, ontology, epistemology, philosophy of mind, history of philosophy

Arda Denkel (6 July 1949 – 21 May 2000) was a Turkish philosopher. He graduated from Lycée Saint-Benoît d'Istanbul in 1968 and began his undergraduate studies at the Department of City and Regional Planning at Middle East Technical University. During his undergraduate education, he attended classes taught by philosophers including Teo Grünberg, Hüseyin Batuhan, and Cemal Yıldırım. He graduated in 1972 and began his doctoral studies in the philosophy of language under the supervision of Peter Strawson at the University of Oxford. He received his Ph.D. in 1977 with a thesis titled 'Communication and Meaning which he later developed into a more expansive study with his book The Natural Background of Meaning in 1999.

Upon his return to Turkey he became an important promoter of analytical philosophy in Turkey, a country traditionally almost entirely cultivated within a continental atmosphere, and became a faculty member in the philosophy department at the Boğaziçi University in Istanbul for the rest of his life.

He was twice a visiting professor at the University of Wisconsin between 1985 and 1989, and served as a member of the steering committee of the European Society for Analytic Philosophy (ESAP) between 1996 and 1999.

He also authored several other books and articles in both Turkish and English, including his Object and Property in 1996. He died in 2000 after a prolonged fight with a brain tumour.

== Books ==
- 1981 Anlaşma: Anlatma ve Anlama
- 1984 Bilginin Temelleri
- 1984 Anlamın Kökeni
- 1986 Nesne ve Doğası
- 1995 Reality and Meaning: A Particularistic Point of View
- 1995 Reality and Meaning
- 1996 Anlam ve Nedensellik
- 1997 Düşünceler ve Gerekçeler I
- 1997 Düşünceler ve Gerekçeler II
- 1998 İlkçağ’da Doğa Felsefeleri
- 1999 The Natural Background of Meaning
