= South English legendaries =

Middle English hagiographic compilations

South English legendaries are compilations of versified saints' lives written in southern dialects of Middle English from the late 13th to 15th centuries. At least fifty of these manuscripts survive, preserving nearly three hundred hagiographic works.

== Manuscripts ==
A legendary is any hagiographic collection. Earlier scholarship attempted to identify a unitary work known as the South English Legendary (SEL) that varied between different copies but still had an identifiable point of origin, similar to The Canterbury Tales or Piers Plowman. More recent work understands 'South English legendaries' as a category of manuscripts that flourished in the later Middle Ages.

The Bodleian Library houses the oldest manuscript (MS. Laud Misc. 108), written in the late thirteenth century. It is likely that the texts this manuscripts contains predate the compilation.

Manuscripts containing versified saints' lives in Middle English include:

- Oxford, Bodleian Library, MS. Laud Misc. 108
- London, British Library, Harley MS 2277
- Oxford, Bodleian Library, MS. Ashmole 43
- London, British Library, Egerton MS 1993
- Cambridge, Magdalene College, Pepys MS 2344
- London, British Library, Stowe MS 949
- Oxford, Bodleian Library, MS. Eng. poet. a.1 (Vernon MS)
- London, Lambeth Palace Library, Lambeth 223
- Oxford, Bodleian Library, MS. Bodl. 779

== Compilation and audience ==
Manfred Görlach concluded that the first collection of versified saints' lives identifiable as a legendary written in southern Middle English was created c. 1270–85. This has largely been supported by subsequent scholarship. Dialectal evidence suggests that most of the texts were composed in the South-West or West Midlands of England.

== Editions ==
- Acker, Paul, "Saint Mildred in the South English Legendary", in The South English Legendary: A Critical Assessment, ed. Klaus Jankofsky (Tübingen: Francke, 1992), 140–153.
- Braswell, Laurel, "Saint Edburga of Winchester: A Study of her Cult, a.d. 950–1500, with an edition of the fourteenth-century Middle English and Latin lives", Mediaeval Studies 33 (1971), 292-333.
- D'Evelyn and Mill, The South English Legendary, edited from Corpus Christi College Cambridge MS. 145 and British Museum MS. Harley 2277 (1956), review: Dorothy Bethurum, Speculum (1959).
- Horstmann, Carl, The Early South English Legendary or Lives of Saints London: 1887. Early English Text Society 87.
- Major, Tristan, "Saint Etheldreda in the South English Legendary," Anglia 128.1 (2010), 83–101.
- Nagy, Michael, "Saint Æþelberht of East Anglia in the South English Legendary", The Chaucer Review 37 (2002), 159–72.
- Yeager, Stephen, "The South English Legendary "Life of St. Edwine": An Edition," Traditio 66 (2011), 170–87.

== Scholarship ==
- Blurton, Heather and Jocelyn Wogan-Browne, ed., Rethinking the 'South English Legendaries' (Manchester: Manchester University Press, 2012).
- Görlach, Manfred. The Textual Tradition of the South English Legendary, Leeds Texts and Monographs, n. s. 6 (Leeds: University of Leeds, 1974).
- Jankofsky, Klaus P, ed. The South English Legendary: A Critical Assessment (Tübingen: Francke, 1992).
- Pearsall, Derek, ed. Studies in The Vernon Manuscript (Cambridge: DS Brewer, 1990).
- Samson, Annie. 'The South English Legendary: Constructing a Context', in Thirteenth Century England I, ed. by P. R. Coss and S. D. Lloyd (Woodbridge: Boydell Press, 1985).
- Thompson, Anne. Everyday Saints and the Art of Narrative in the South English Legendary. (Aldershot: Ashgate, 2003).
