= Valar =

Divine or angelic race in Tolkien's writings

Relationships between the Valar

The Valar (['valar]; sing. Vala) are characters in J. R. R. Tolkien's Middle-earth writings. They are "angelic powers" or "gods" (Note: Carpenter 2023, #154 to Naomi Mitchison, September 1954) subordinate to the one God (Eru Ilúvatar). The Ainulindalë describes how some of the Ainur choose to enter the world (Arda) to complete its material development, after its form is determined by the Music of the Ainur. The mightiest of these are called the Valar, or "the Powers of the World", and the lesser spirits are called the Maiar.

The Valar are mentioned briefly in The Lord of the Rings, but Tolkien had developed them earlier, in material published posthumously in The Silmarillion, especially the "Valaquenta" (Quenya: "Account of the Valar"), The History of Middle-earth, and Unfinished Tales. Scholars have noted that the Valar resemble angels in Christianity but that Tolkien presented them rather more like pagan gods. They play a role in providing what the characters in Middle-earth experience as luck or providence.

== Origin and acts ==
The creator Eru Ilúvatar first reveals to the Ainur his great vision of the world, Arda, through musical themes, as described in Ainulindalë, "The Music of the Ainur". (Note: Tolkien 1977, "Ainulindalë")

This world, fashioned from his ideas and expressed as the Music of Ilúvatar, is refined by thoughtful interpretations by the Ainur, who create their own themes based on each unique comprehension. No one Ainu understands all the themes that spring from Ilúvatar. Instead, each elaborates individual themes, like singing of mountains and subterranean regions from themes for metals and stones. The themes of Ilúvatar's music are elaborated, and each of the Ainur adds harmonious creative touches. Melkor, however, adds discordant themes out of selfishness and vanity, and strives against the Music.

The Valar's first home is the Isle of Almaren, in the middle of Arda in the Years of the Lamps. (Note: Tolkien 1977, ch. 1, "Of the Beginning of Days")

Once the Music is complete, including Melkor's interwoven themes, Ilúvatar gives the Ainur a choice—to dwell with him or to enter the world that they have mutually created. The greatest of those that choose to enter the world become known as the Valar, the 'Powers of Arda', and the lesser are called the Maiar. Among the Valar are some of the most powerful and wise of the Ainur, including Manwë, the Lord of the Valar, and Melkor, his brother. The two are distinguished by the selfless love of Manwë for the Music of Ilúvatar and the selfish love that Melkor bears for himself and no other—least of all for the Children of Ilúvatar, Elves and Men.

Melkor (later named Morgoth, Sindarin for "dark enemy") arrives in the world first, causing tumult wherever he goes. As the others arrive, they see how Melkor's presence would destroy the integrity of Ilúvatar's themes. Eventually, and with the aid of the Vala Tulkas, who enters Arda last, Melkor is temporarily overthrown, and the Valar begin shaping the world and creating beauty to counter the darkness and evil of Melkor's discordant noise.

Valinor, the Blessed Realm, on the continent of Aman in the far West of Arda

Most terrible of the early deeds of Melkor is the destruction of the Two Lamps and with them, the original home of the Valar, the Isle of Almaren at the middle of the world. This permanently destroys the world's symmetry and forces the Valar to move to the western continent of Aman ("Unmarred"), where they found Valinor. The war with Melkor continues: The Valar realize many wonderful subthemes of Ilúvatar's grand music, while Melkor pours all his energy into Arda and the corruption of creatures like Balrogs, dragons, and Orcs. Eventually, Melkor is captured and chained for many ages in the fastness of Mandos, until he is pardoned by Manwë. (Note: Tolkien 1977, ch. 3 "Of the Coming of the Elves and the Captivity of Melkor")

With the arrival of the Elves in the world, a new phase of the regency of the Valar begins. Summoned by the Valar, many Elves abandon Middle-earth for Valinor, where the Valar concentrate their creativity. There they make the Two Trees, their greatest joy because they illuminate the beauty of Valinor and delight the Elves. Fëanor, a Noldor Elf, with forethought and love, captures the light of the Two Trees in the three Silmarils, the greatest jewels ever created.

At Melkor's instigation, the evil giant spider Ungoliant destroys the Trees. Melkor steals the Silmarils from Fëanor, kills his father, Finwë, chief of the Noldor in Aman, and flees to Middle-earth. Many of the Noldor, in defiance of the will of the Valar, swear revenge and set out in pursuit. This event, and the poisonous words of Melkor that foster mistrust among the Elves, leads to the exile of the greater part of the Noldor to Middle-earth: The Valar close Valinor against them to prevent their return. (Note: Tolkien 1977, ch. 9 "Of the Flight of the Noldor")

For the remainder of the First Age, the Lord of Waters, Ulmo, alone of the Valar, visits the world beyond Aman. Ulmo directly influences the actions of Tuor, setting him on the path to find the hidden city of Gondolin. (Note: Tolkien 1977, ch. 23, "Of Tuor and the Fall of Gondolin") At the end of the First Age, the Valar send forth a great host of Maiar and Elves from Valinor to Middle-earth, fighting the War of Wrath, in which Melkor is defeated. The lands are changed, and the Elves are again called to Valinor. (Note: Tolkien 1977, ch. 24, "Of the Voyage of Eärendil and the War of Wrath")

During the Second Age, the Valar's main deeds are the creation of Númenor as a refuge for the Edain, who are denied access to Aman but given dominion over the rest of the world. The Valar, now including even Ulmo, remain aloof from Middle-earth, allowing the rise to power of Morgoth's lieutenant, Sauron, as a new Dark Lord. Near the end of the Second Age, Sauron convinces the Númenóreans to attack Aman itself. This leads Manwë to call upon Ilúvatar to restore the world to order; Ilúvatar answers by destroying Númenor, as described in the Akallabêth. (Note: Tolkien 1977, "Akallabêth") Aman is removed from Arda (though not from the whole created world, Eä, for Elvish ships could still reach it). In the Third Age, the Valar send the Istari (or wizards) to Middle-earth to aid in the battle against Sauron. (Note: Tolkien 1980, "The Istari")

== The chief Valar ==
The names and attributes of the chief Valar, as they are described in the "Valaquenta", are listed below. In Middle-earth, they are known by their Sindarin names: Varda, for example, is called Elbereth. Men know them by many other names, and sometimes worship them as gods. With the exception of Oromë, the names listed below are not actual names but rather titles: The true names of the Valar are nowhere recorded. The males are called "Lords of the Valar", and the females are called "Queens of the Valar," or Valier. Of the known seven male and seven female Valar, there are six married pairs: Ulmo and Nienna are the only ones who dwell alone. This is evidently a spiritual rather than a physical union, as in Tolkien's later conception they do not reproduce. (Note: Tolkien 1977, "Valaquenta")

The Aratar (Quenya: Exalted), or High Ones of Arda, are the eight greatest of the Valar: Manwë, Varda, Ulmo, Yavanna, Aulë, Mandos, Nienna, and Oromë. Lórien and Mandos are brothers and are collectively called the Fëanturi, "Masters of Spirits".

Ilúvatar brings the Valar (and all the Ainur) into being by his thought and may therefore be considered their father. However, not all the Valar are siblings; where this is held to be so, it is because they are so "in the thought of Ilúvatar". It was the Valar who first practise marriage and later pass on their custom to the Elves; all the Valar have spouses, save Nienna, Ulmo, and Melkor. Only one such marriage among the Valar takes place within the world, that of Tulkas and Nessa after the raising of the Two Lamps.

=== Lords ===
Lords of the Valar
Name(s)	Duties	Spouse	Dwelling-place	Description
Manwë	King of the Valar, King of Arda, Lord of air, wind, and clouds	Varda	Atop Mount Taniquetil, the highest mountain of the world, in the domed halls of Ilmarin from where he could see right across Middle-earth	Noblest and greatest in authority, but not in power, of the Ainur; greatest of the Aratar. Observes the tidings of Middle-earth and intervenes when necessary by use of his heralds, the Eagles of Manwë and their king, Thorondor.
Ulmo	Lord of Waters	——	No fixed dwelling place: he lives in the deep waters of the ocean	Comes to Valinor only in dire need. A chief architect of Arda. In authority, second to Manwë. Sympathetic to the plight of the Ñoldor and delivers them hope in the form of Tuor who weds Idril and fathers Eärendil, the mariner who sails the difficult seas and arrives in Valinor to plead with the Valar on behalf of the Ñoldor. The only one of the Valar who helped the Children of Eru even while the other Valar had forsaken Middle-Earth.
Aulë	Lord of matter, Master of all crafts	Yavanna	Valinor	Creates the seven fathers of the Dwarves, who call him Mahal, the Maker. Eru is not pleased, as the stone people are not of the original theme and possess no fëa, only being able to do as the will of Aulë commands, but when Aulë lifts his hammer to smite them in repentance, they tremble upon the sight of Aulë's hammer, as Eru in that moment grants them fëa and pardons Aulë's disobedience. Eru notes the repercussions, including the love of the Dwarves' iron for Yavanna's trees. During the Music of the Ainur, Aulë's themes concern the physical things of which Arda is made; when Eru gives being to the themes of the Ainur, his music becomes the lands of Middle-earth. He created Angainor (the chain of Melkor), the Two Lamps, the aforementioned dwarves, and the vessels of the Sun and Moon.
Oromë [ˈorome], Araw in Sindarin, Aldaron "Lord of the Trees", Arum, Béma, Arāmē, the Great Rider	Huntsman of the Valar	Vána		Brother of Nessa. Active in the struggle against Morgoth. Renowned for his anger, the most terrible of the Valar in his wrath. Has a mighty horn, Valaróma, and a steed called Nahar. During the Years of the Trees, after most of the Valar had hidden in Aman, Oromë still hunts the Enemy in the forests of Middle-earth with Huan, Hound of the Valar. There he finds the Elves at Cuiviénen. (Note: In The Return of the King, Théoden is compared to Oromë when he leads the charge of Rohirrim in The Battle of the Pelennor Fields: "Fey he seemed, or the battle-fury of his fathers ran like new fire in his veins, and he was borne up on Snowmane like a god of old, even as Oromë the Great in the battle of the Valar when the world was young." (Note: Tolkien 1955, book 5, ch. 6 "The Battle of the Pelennor Fields"))
Mandos [ˈmandos], Námo [ˈnaːmo]	Judge of the Dead, Master of Doom, Chief advisor to Manwë, Keeper of the souls of elves	Vairë	Halls of Mandos	Stern and dispassionate, never forgetting a thing. Speaks the Prophecy of the North against the Noldor Elves leaving Aman, counselling that they should not be allowed to return. (Note: "Tears unnumbered ye shall shed; and the Valar will fence Valinor against you, and shut you out, so that not even the echo of your lamentation shall pass over the mountains. On the House of Fëanor the wrath of the Valar lieth from the West unto the uttermost East, and upon all that will follow them it shall be laid also. Their Oath shall drive them, and yet betray them, and ever snatch away the very treasures that they have sworn to pursue. To evil end shall all things turn that they begin well; and by treason of kin unto kin, and the fear of treason, shall this come to pass. The Dispossessed shall they be for ever." The Silmarillion (Note: Tolkien 1977 ch. 9 "Of the Flight of the Noldor")) The prophecies and judgments of Mandos, unlike Morgoth, are not cruel or vindictive by his own design. They are simply the will of Eru, and he does not speak them unless he is commanded to do so by Manwë. Only once is he moved to pity, when Lúthien sings of the grief she and her lover Beren had experienced in Beleriand.
Lórien [ˈloːrien], Irmo [ˈirmo]	Master of Visions and Dreams	Estë	Lórien	Named Irmo, but more commonly called Lórien, after his dwelling place. Lórien and Mandos are the Fëanturi: Masters of spirits. Lórien, the younger, is the master of visions and dreams. His gardens in the land of the Valar, where he dwells with his wife Estë, are the fairest place in the world and are filled with many spirits. All those who dwell in Valinor find rest and refreshment at the fountain of Irmo and Estë. Since he is the master of dreams, he and his servants are well aware of the hopes and dreams of the children of Eru. Olórin, or Gandalf, prior to his assignment by Manwë to a role as one of the Istari, is a Maia who long taught in the gardens of Lórien.
Tulkas [ˈtulkas] the Strong, Astaldo "The Brave One"	Champion of Valinor	Nessa		Not initially one of the Valar, Tulkas the Strong is "greatest in strength and deeds of prowess ... [who] came last to Arda, to aid the Valar in the first battles with Melkor". Having joined the Valar, Tulkas is the Last of the Valar to descend into Arda, helping tip the scales against Melkor prior to the creation of the Two Lamps. Swifter on foot than any other living thing, he eschews a steed in battle. A wrestler, physically the strongest of the Valar, his fist is his only weapon. He laughs in sport and in war, and even laughs in the face of Melkor. Husband of Nessa; slow to anger, but slow to forget; opposes release of Melkor after his prison sentence.

=== Queens ===
The Valier, Queens of the Valar
Name(s)	Spouse	Description
Varda; Elentári in Quenya; Elbereth Gilthoniel in Sindarin; Lady of the Stars the Kindler	Manwë	Kindles the first stars before the Ainur descend into the world; later brightens them with gold and silver dew from the Two Trees. Melkor fears and hates her the most, because she rejected him before Time. The Elvish hymn A Elbereth Gilthoniel appears in three differing forms in The Lord of the Rings. (Note: Tolkien 1954a, book 1, ch. 3 "Three is Company") (Note: Tolkien 1954a, book 2, ch. 1 "Many Meetings") (Note: Tolkien 1954, book 4, ch. 10 "The Choices of Master Samwise")
Nienna; Lady of Mercy, acquainted with grief	——	Tutor of Olórin; weeps constantly, but not for herself; and those who hearken to her learn pity, and endurance in hope. She gives strength to those in the Hall of Mandos. Her tears are those of healing and compassion, not of sadness, and often have potency; she watered the Two Trees with her tears, and washed the filth of Ungoliant away from them once they were destroyed. She was in favour of releasing Melkor after his sentence, not being able to see his evil nature.
Estë [ˈeste] The Gentle "the healer of hurts and of weariness"	Irmo	Her name means 'Rest'. "Grey is her raiment, and rest her gift." Lives with Irmo in his Gardens of Lórien in Valinor. She sleeps by day on the island in the Lake Lorellin.
Vairë [ˈvai̯re] the Weaver	Mandos	She weaves the story of the world in her tapestries, which are draped all over the halls of Mandos.
Yavanna [jaˈvanna] Queen of the Earth; Giver of Fruits	Aulë	She is responsible for both kelvar (animals) and olvar (plants). She requested the creation of the Ents, concerned for the safety of the trees once her husband created the Dwarves. The Two Lamps were created by Aulë at Yavanna's request; their light germinated the seeds that she had planted throughout Arda. Following the destruction of the Two Lamps by Melkor and the withdrawal of the Valar to Aman, Yavanna sings into being her greatest creation, the Two Trees of Valinor.
Vána [ˈvaːna] Queen of Blossoming Flowers and the Ever-young	Oromë	Younger sister of Yavanna. "All flowers spring as she passes and open if she glances upon them; and all birds sing at her coming." She dwells in gardens filled with golden flowers and often comes to the forests of Oromë. Tolkien wrote that Vána was "the most perfectly 'beautiful' in form and feature (also 'holy' but not august or sublime), representing the natural unmarred perfection of form in living things". (Note: Tolkien 2007, p. 150 "Words, Phrases and Passages")
Nessa; The Dancer	Tulkas	Sister of Oromë. Noted for her agility and speed, she is able to outrun the deer who follow her in the wild. Known for her love of dancing and celebration on the ever-green lawns of Valinor.

=== Ex-Valar ===
Ex-Valar
Name(s)	Duties	Spouse	Dwelling-place	Description
Melkor or Morgoth	——	——	Fortress of Angband under Thangorodrim mountains, Beleriand.	Melkor means "He who arises in might". Morgoth means "Dark Enemy". Originally the most powerful Valar. The great enemy, the first Dark Lord; seeking to destroy both Elves and Men. Corrupts many Maiar such as Sauron and the Balrogs.

== Language ==
Tolkien at first decided that Valarin, the tongue of the Valar, would be the proto-language of the Elves. He developed the Valarin language and its grammar in the early 1930s. (Note: Tolkien 1987, ch. 7 The Lhammas) In this early conception, as described in the 1937 Lhammas, all Middle-earth's languages are derived from Valarin. In the 1940s, he changed his mind, and the tongue he had developed became Primitive Quendian instead. (Note: Tolkien 2009, p. 72 "Tengwesta Qenderinwa") He then conceived an entirely new tongue for the Valar, still called Valarin; he did not develop this new language in any detail. (Note: Tolkien 1994, pp. 397–407) In this later conception, Valarin is unrelated to the other languages of Middle-earth. Only a few words of Valarin, mainly proper names, are recorded. The Valar can communicate through thought and have no need for a spoken language, but may have developed Valarin when they took physical, humanlike (or elf-like) forms.

== Analysis ==
=== Beowulf ===
The passage at the start of the Old English poem Beowulf about Scyld Scefing contains a cryptic mention of þā ("those") who have sent Scyld as a baby in a boat, presumably from across the sea, and to whom Scyld's body is returned in a ship funeral, the vessel sailing by itself. Shippey suggests that Tolkien may have seen in this both an implication of a Valar-like group who behave much like gods, and a glimmer of his Old Straight Road, the way across the sea to Valinor forever closed to mortal Men by the remaking of the world after Númenor's attack on Valinor.

=== Norse Æsir ===
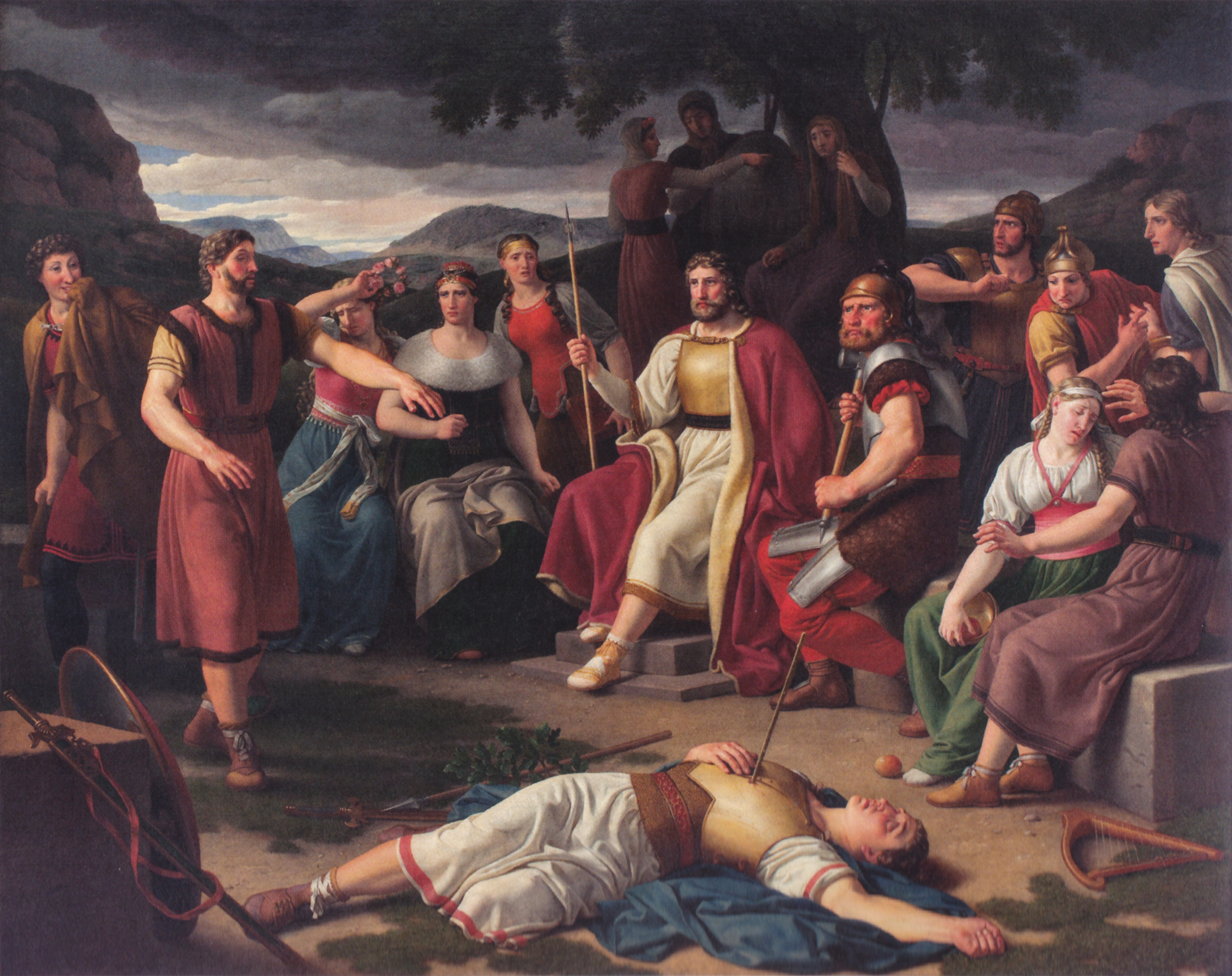
Some critics have noted the similarity of the Valar to the Æsir, the strong and combative Norse gods of Asgard. Painting by Christoffer Wilhelm Eckersberg, 1817.

Scholars such as John Garth have noted that the Valar resemble the Æsir, the Norse gods of Asgard. Thor, for example, physically the strongest of the gods, can be seen both in Oromë, who fights the monsters of Melkor, and in Tulkas, the strongest of the Valar. Manwë, the head of the Valar, has some similarities to Odin, the "Allfather", while the wizard Gandalf, one of the Maiar, resembles Odin the wanderer.

=== Godlike power ===
Tolkien compared King Théoden of Rohan, charging into the enemy at the Battle of the Pelennor Fields, to a Vala of great power, and to "a god of old": (Note: Tolkien 1955, book 5, ch. 5, "The Ride of the Rohirrim")

Théoden could not be overtaken. Fey he seemed, or the battle-fury of his fathers ran like new fire in his veins, and he was borne up on Snowmane like a god of old, even as Oromë the Great in the battle of the Valar when the world was young. His golden shield was uncovered, and lo! it shone like an image of the Sun, and the grass flamed into green about the white feet of his steed. For morning came ... and the hosts of Mordor wailed ... and the hoofs of wrath rode over them.

The Episcopal priest and author Fleming Rutledge comments that while Tolkien is not equating the events here with the Messiah's return, he was happy when readers picked up biblical echoes. In her view the language here is clearly biblical, evoking Malachi's messianic prophecy "See, the day is coming, burning like an oven, when all the arrogant and all evildoers will be stubble ... And you shall tread down the wicked, for they will be ashes under the soles of your feet".

=== Pagan gods or angels ===
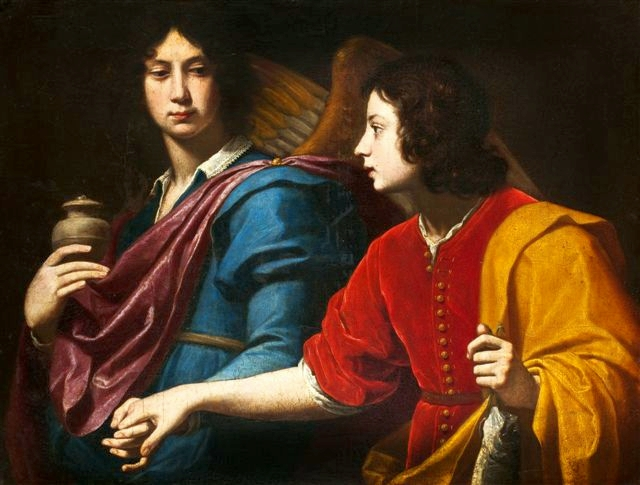
Other scholars have likened the Valar to Christian angels, intermediaries between the creator and the created world. Painting by Lorenzo Lippi, c. 1645

The theologian Ralph C. Wood describes the Valar and Maiar as being what Christians "would call angels", intermediaries between the creator, Eru Ilúvatar, and the created cosmos. Like angels, they have free will and can therefore rebel against him.

Matthew Dickerson, writing in the J.R.R. Tolkien Encyclopedia, calls the Valar the "Powers of Middle-earth", noting that they are not incarnated and quoting the Tolkien scholar Verlyn Flieger's description of their original role as "to shape and light the world". Dickerson writes that while Tolkien presents the Valar like pagan gods, he imagined them more like angels and notes that scholars have compared the devotion of Tolkien's Elves to Elbereth, an epithet of Varda, as resembling the Roman Catholic veneration of Mary the mother of Jesus. Dickerson states that the key point is that the Valar were "not to be worshipped". He argues that as a result, the Valar's knowledge and power had to be limited, and they could make mistakes and moral errors. Their bringing of the Elves to Valinor meant that the Elves were "gathered at their knee", a moral error as it suggested something close to worship.

The scholar of literature Marjorie Burns notes that Tolkien wrote that to be acceptable to modern readers, mythology had to be brought up to "our grade of assessment". In her view, between his early work, The Book of Lost Tales, (Note: The Book of Lost Tales had two additional Valar, Makar and Meássë, omitted from Tolkien's later works, with roles similar to war gods of classical myth. (Note: Tolkien 1984, chs 3 "The Coming of the Valar and the Building of Valinor", 4 "The Chaining of Melko", 5 "The Coming of the Elves and the Making of Kôr", and 6 "The Theft of Melko and the Darkening of Valinor")) and the published Silmarillion, the Valar had greatly changed, "civilized and modernized", and this had made the Valar "slowly and slightly" more Christian. For example, the Valar now had "spouses" rather than "wives", and their unions were spiritual, not physical. All the same, she writes, readers still perceive the Valar "as a pantheon", serving as gods.

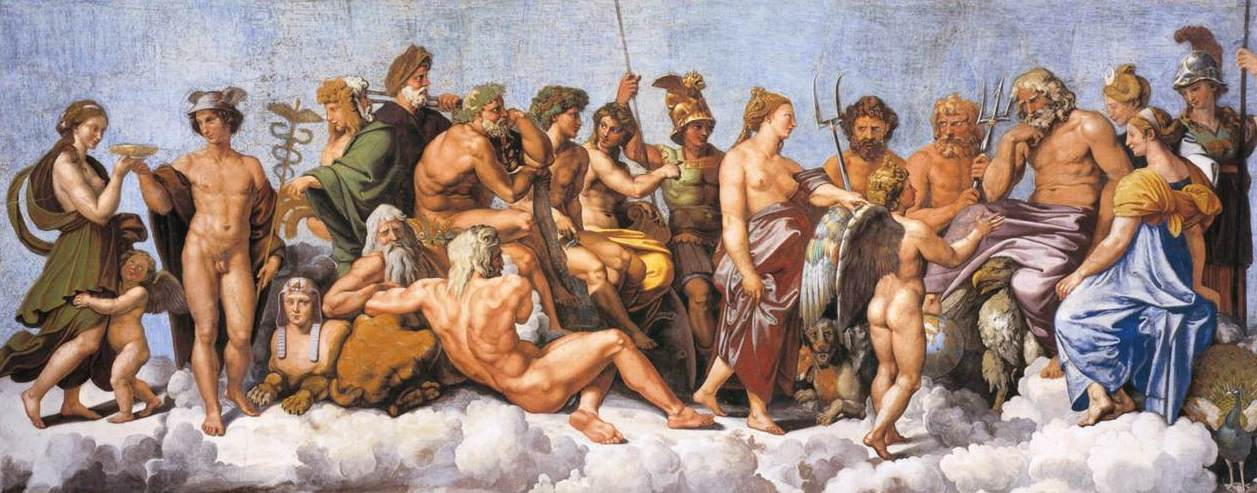
Tolkien's Valar behave as a group, so that readers perceive them as a pantheon like the Olympian gods of the Greeks.

Elizabeth Whittingham comments that the Valar are unique to Tolkien, "somewhere between gods and angels". In her view, they mostly lack the rough brutality of the Norse gods; they have the angels' "sense of moral rightness" but disagree with each other; and their statements most closely resemble those of Homer's Greek gods, who can express their frustration with mortal men, as Zeus does in the Odyssey In a letter to Milton Waldman, Tolkien states directly that the Valar are "'divine', that is, were originally 'outside' and existed 'before' the making of the world. Their power and wisdom is derived from their Knowledge of the cosmogonical drama". (Note: Carpenter 2023, #131 to Milton Waldman, late 1951) He explains that he intends them to be "of the same order of beauty, power, and majesty as the 'gods' of higher mythology". Whittingham notes further that Tolkien likens lesser spirits, wizards, who are Maiar not Valar, to guardian angels; and that when describing the Maiar he "vacillates between 'gods' and 'angels' because both terms are close but neither is exactly right". Tolkien states in another letter that the Valar "entered the world after its making, and that the name is properly applied only to the great among them, who take the imaginative but not the theological place of 'gods'." (Note: Carpenter 2023, #212, unsent draft continuation to Rhona Beare, on or after 14 October 1858) Whittingham comments that the "thoughtful and carefully developed explanations" that Tolkien gives in these letters are markedly unlike his depictions of the Valar in his "earliest stories".

=== Luck or providence ===
The Tolkien scholar Tom Shippey discusses the connection between the Valar and "luck" on Middle-earth, writing that as in real life, "People ... do in sober reality recognise a strongly patterning force in the world around them" but that while this may be due to "Providence or the Valar", the force "does not affect free will and cannot be distinguished from the ordinary operations of nature" nor reduce the necessity of "heroic endeavour". He states that this exactly matches the Old English view of luck and personal courage, as Beowulf's "wyrd often spares the man who isn't doomed, as long as his courage holds." The scholar of humanities Paul H. Kocher similarly discusses the role of providence, in the form of the intentions of the Valar or of the creator, in Bilbo's finding of the One Ring and Frodo's bearing of it; as Gandalf says, they were "meant" to have it, though it remained their choice to co-operate with this purpose.

Rutledge writes that in The Lord of the Rings, and especially at moments like Gandalf's explanation to Frodo in "The Shadow of the Past", there are clear hints of a higher power at work in events in Middle-earth:

There was more than one power at work, Frodo. The Ring was trying to get back to its master ... Behind that there was something else at work, beyond any design of the Ring-maker. I can put it no plainer than by saying that Bilbo was meant to find the Ring, and not by its maker. In which case you also were meant to have it. [Tolkien's italics] (Note: Tolkien 1954a, book 1, ch. 2 "The Shadow of the Past")

Rutledge notes that in this way, Tolkien repeatedly hints at a higher power "that controls even the Ring itself, even the maker of the Ring himself [her italics]", and asks who or what that power might be. Her reply is that at the surface level, it means the Valar, "a race of created beings (analogous to the late-biblical angels)"; at a deeper level, it means "the One", Eru Ilúvatar, or in Christian terms, divine Providence.
