= AWK (disambiguation) =

AWK is a programming language for text processing.

AWK or awk may also refer to:

- Adwick railway station, Yorkshire, England
- American Water Works (by NYSE ticker)
- Awabakal language, spoken in eastern Australia (ISO 639-3:awk)
- Wake Island Airfield, Micronesia (by IATA code)

== See also ==
- AUK (disambiguation)
- ORC (disambiguation)
- ORK (disambiguation)
