= Tolkien and Edwardian adventure stories =

Effect on Tolkien's legendarium

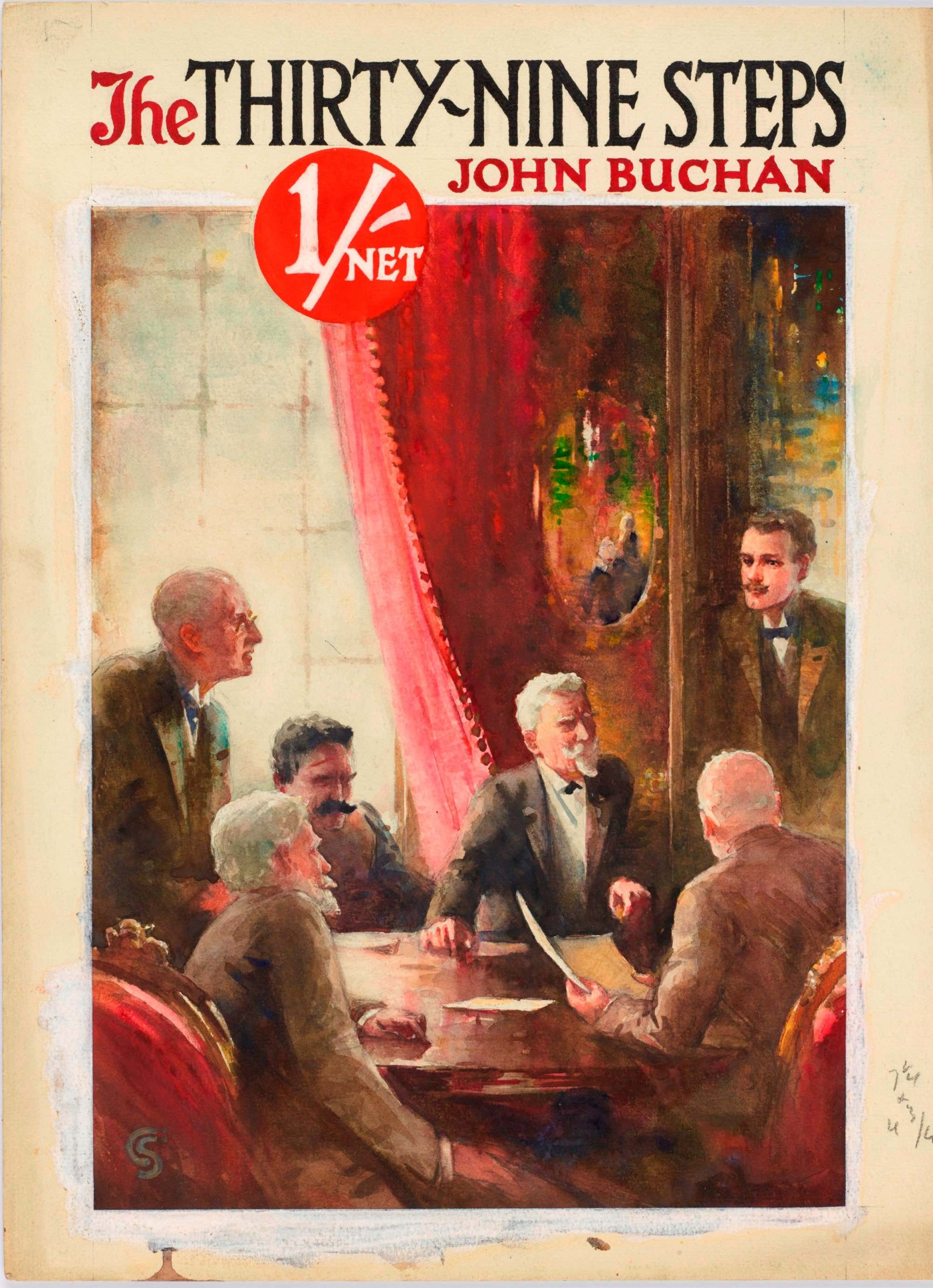
Tolkien said he enjoyed John Buchan's stories; scholars have compared his writings to Buchan's, such as the 1915 novel The Thirty-Nine Steps.

The philologist and author J. R. R. Tolkien enjoyed Edwardian adventure stories by authors such as John Buchan and H. Rider Haggard as a boy, and among many other influences made use of their structure and motifs in his epic fantasy The Lord of the Rings.

The Tolkien scholar Jared Lobdell accordingly writes that the novel is in the tradition of the Edwardian adventure story. Among the parallels that he mentions are the story of Englishmen travelling abroad; the past strangely alive in the present; the accidental assembling of the group of travellers, and their safe return.

The scholar Julie Pridmore agrees with Lobdell that The Hobbit is reminiscent of Edwardian adventure stories, but writes that The Lord of the Rings is more clearly modern. Tom Shippey comments that Tolkien's writing is post-war; Pridmore concurs that having experienced the First World War, Tolkien made his heroes ordinary soldiers, unlike Victorian or Edwardian adventure heroes. Anna Vaninskaya writes that while Tolkien was influenced by authors born in the Victorian era, he can be viewed as responding like James Joyce and T. S. Eliot to the trauma of the First World War, or like William Golding and George Orwell to the evil of the Second World War.

== Context ==
=== Adventure fiction ===
Adventure fiction presents danger, or gives the reader a sense of excitement, sometimes outside ordinary experience. Especially in the English Victorian and Edwardian eras, many adventure stories for young people were written, often with an excitingly exotic setting in faraway places in the British Empire. Such stories were often primarily for boys, described by Martin Green as embodying the "energising myth of English Imperialism", forming "collectively, the story that England told itself as it went to sleep at night ... they charged England's will with the energy to go out into the world and explore, conquer, and rule".

=== Tolkien ===
J. R. R. Tolkien was a scholar of English literature, a philologist and medievalist interested in language and poetry from the Middle Ages, especially that of Anglo-Saxon England and Northern Europe. His professional knowledge of works such as Beowulf shaped his fictional world of Middle-earth, including his fantasy novel The Lord of the Rings. (Note: Carpenter 2023, #131 to Milton Waldman, late 1951) This did not prevent him from making use of modern sources as well; in the J.R.R. Tolkien Encyclopedia, Dale Nelson discusses 25 authors whose works are paralleled by elements in Tolkien's writings. Thomas Kullmann and Dirk Siepmann state that "the tradition Tolkien owes most to ... is nineteenth- and early twentieth-century novel-writing." Tolkien's fantasy writing however also drew on a wide array of influences including his profession, philology, and his religion, Christianity. He incorporated many themes in his Middle-earth writings, from environmentalism and the sound of language to addiction to power.

=== Boyhood favourites ===
In the case of a few authors, such as John Buchan and H. Rider Haggard, it is known that Tolkien enjoyed their adventure stories. Tolkien stated that he "preferred the lighter contemporary novels", such as Buchan's. Critics have detailed resonances between the two authors. In Ross Smith's words, Tolkien liked "imaginative novels which [were] a 'cracking good read'". The poet W. H. Auden compared The Fellowship of the Ring to Buchan's thriller The Thirty-Nine Steps. Nelson states that Tolkien responded rather directly to the "mythopoeic and straightforward adventure romance" in Haggard's novels. Tolkien wrote that stories about "Red Indians" were his favourites as a boy; the Tolkien scholar Tom Shippey likens the Fellowship's trip downriver, from Lothlórien to Tol Brandir "with its canoes and portages", to James Fenimore Cooper's 1826 historical romance The Last of the Mohicans. Shippey writes that in the Eastemnet, Éomer's riders of Rohan circle "round the strangers, weapons poised" in a scene "more like the old movies' image of the Comanche or the Cheyenne than anything from English history".

Scholars have commented, too, on the similarities between Tolkien's monstrous Gollum and the evil and ancient hag Gagool in Haggard's 1885 novel King Solomon's Mines. Gagool appeared as

a withered-up monkey [that] crept on all fours ... a most extraordinary and weird countenance. It was (apparently) that of a woman of great age, so shrunken that in size it was no larger than that of a year-old child, and was made up of a collection of deep yellow wrinkles ... a pair of large black eyes, still full of fire and intelligence, which gleamed and played under the snow-white eyebrows, and the projecting parchment-coloured skull, like jewels in a charnel-house. As for the skull itself, it was perfectly bare, and yellow in hue, while its wrinkled scalp moved and contracted like the hood of a cobra."

Tolkien wrote of being impressed as a boy by Samuel Rutherford Crockett's 1899 historical fantasy novel The Black Douglas and of using its fight with werewolves for the battle with the wargs in The Fellowship of the Ring. (Note: Carpenter 2023, Tolkien's footnote to letter 306 to Michael Tolkien, 1967-68) Critics have suggested other incidents and characters that it could possibly have inspired. (Note: Tolkien 1937, p. 150) Tolkien stated that he had read many of Edgar Rice Burroughs' books, but denied that the Barsoom novels influenced his giant spiders such as Shelob and Ungoliant: "Spiders I had met long before Burroughs began to write, and I do not think he is in any way responsible for Shelob. At any rate I retain no memory of the Siths or the Apts."

When Tolkien was interviewed in 1966, the only book he named as a favourite was Haggard's 1887 adventure novel She: "I suppose as a boy She interested me as much as anything—like the Greek shard of Amyntas [Amenartas], which was the kind of machine by which everything got moving." A facsimile of this potsherd appeared in Haggard's first edition, and the ancient inscription it bore, once translated, led the English characters to She's ancient kingdom, perhaps influencing the "Testament of Isildur" in The Lord of the Rings and Tolkien's efforts to produce a realistic-looking page from the Book of Mazarbul, a record of the fate of the Dwarf colony in Moria. Critics starting with Edwin Muir have found resemblances between Haggard's romances and Tolkien's. Jared Lobdell has compared Saruman's death to the sudden shrivelling of Ayesha when she steps into the flame of immortality.

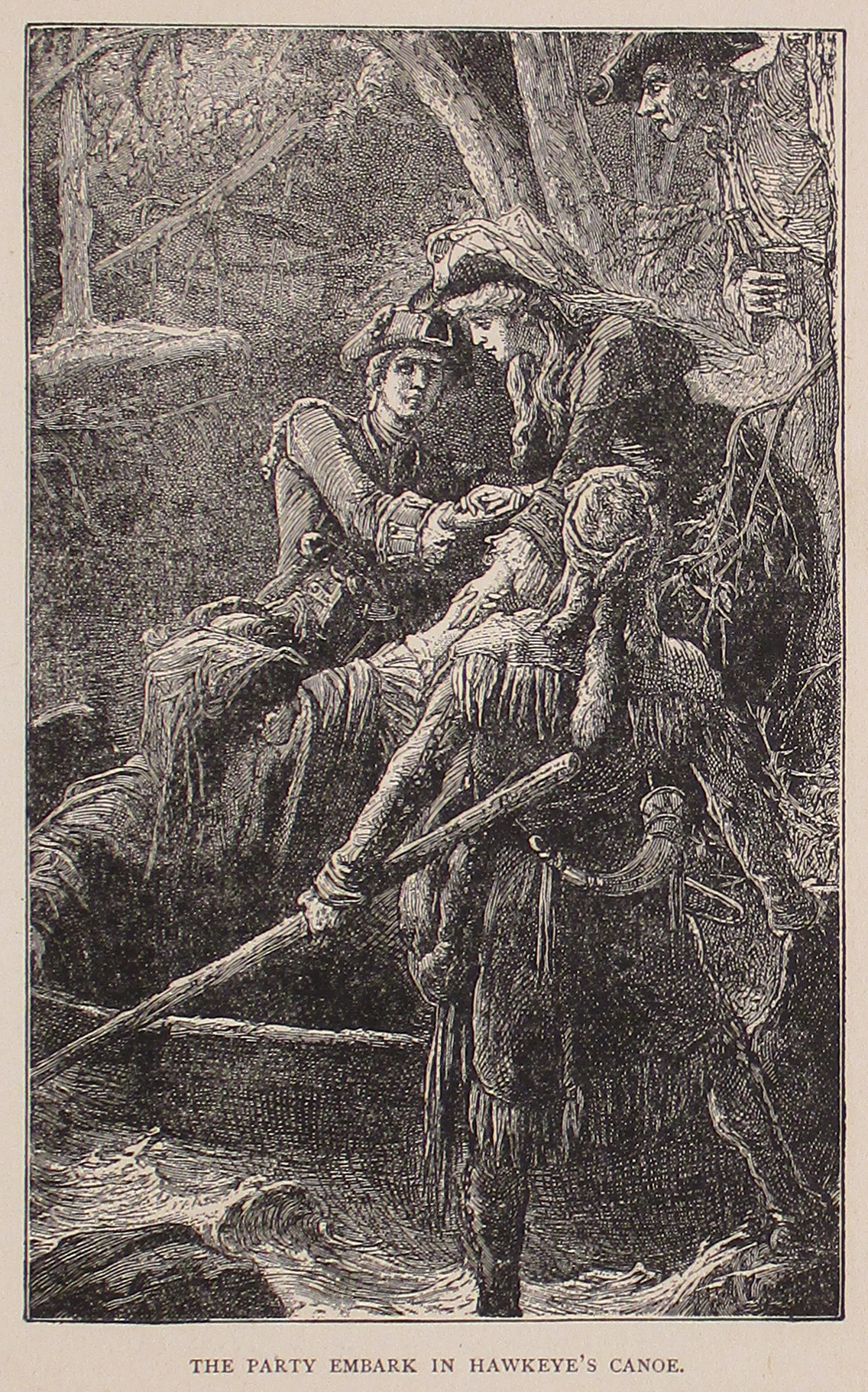
The Fellowship of the Ring's trip downriver has been likened to events in James Fenimore Cooper's 1826 The Last of the Mohicans.

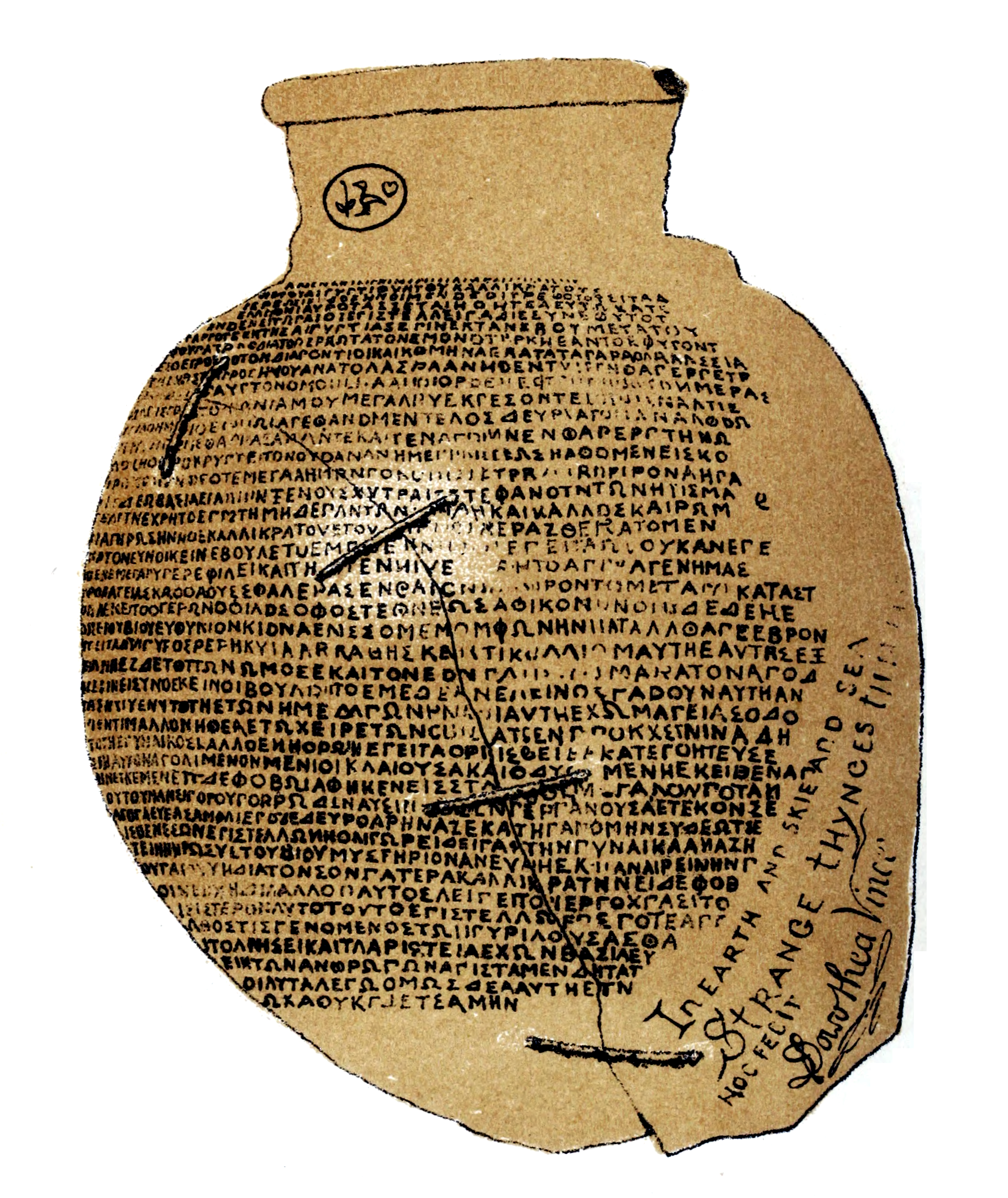
Rider Haggard's "sherd of Amenartas" for his 1887 She may have inspired Tolkien's facsimile Book of Mazarbul.

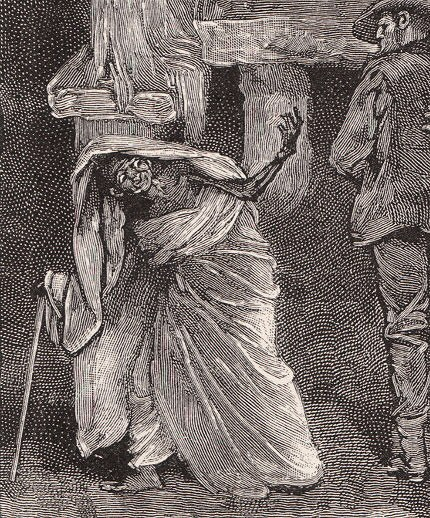
Gollum may derive from the "shrunken" Gagool in Rider Haggard's 1888 King Solomon's Mines.

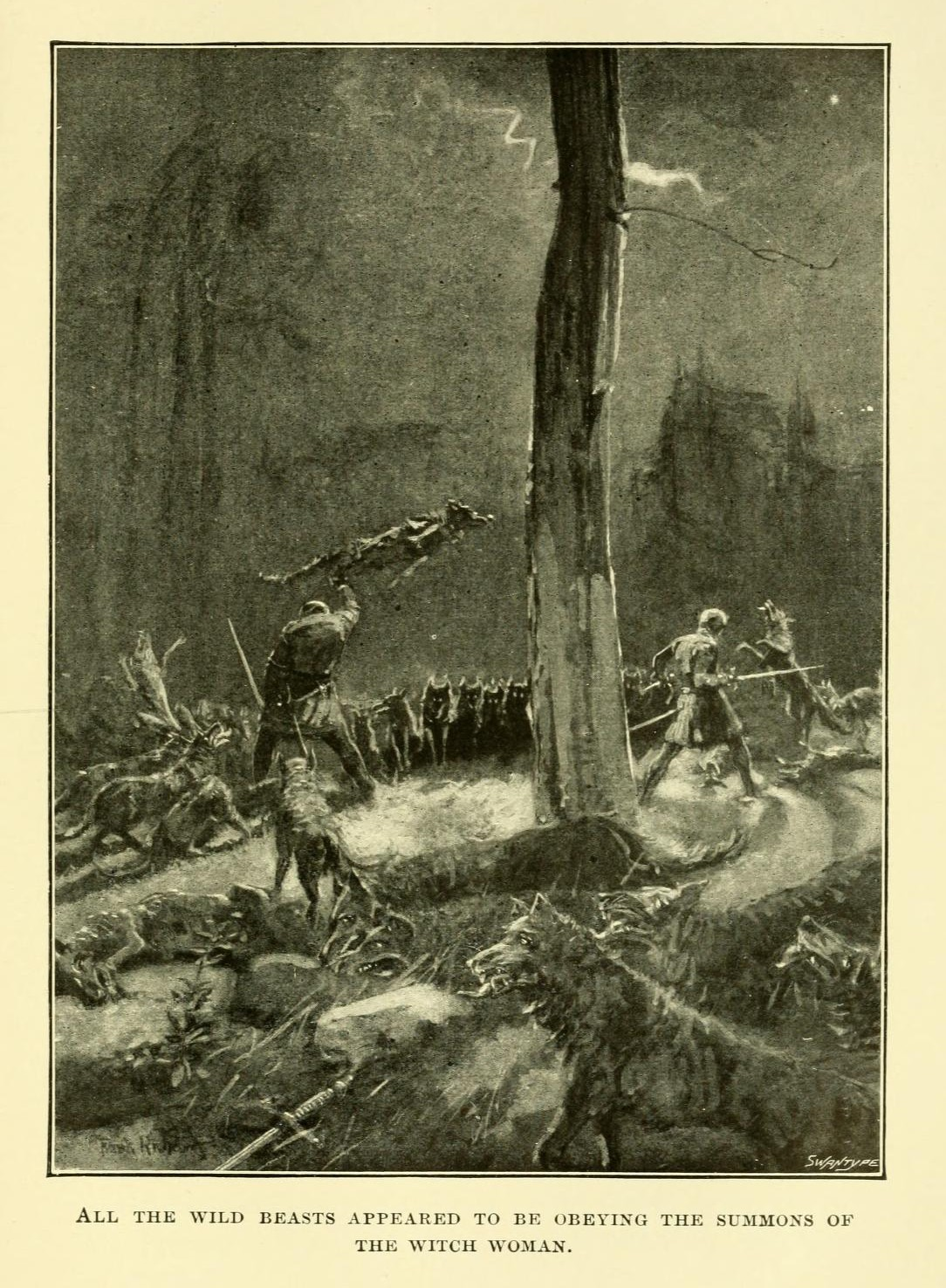
Tolkien based his battle with the wargs on the werewolf fight in Samuel Rutherford Crockett's 1899 The Black Douglas.

Nature attacks the protagonists, here as pterodactyls in Arthur Conan Doyle's 1912 The Lost World (illustration from French serial version, 1914)

== "An adventure story in the Edwardian mode" ==
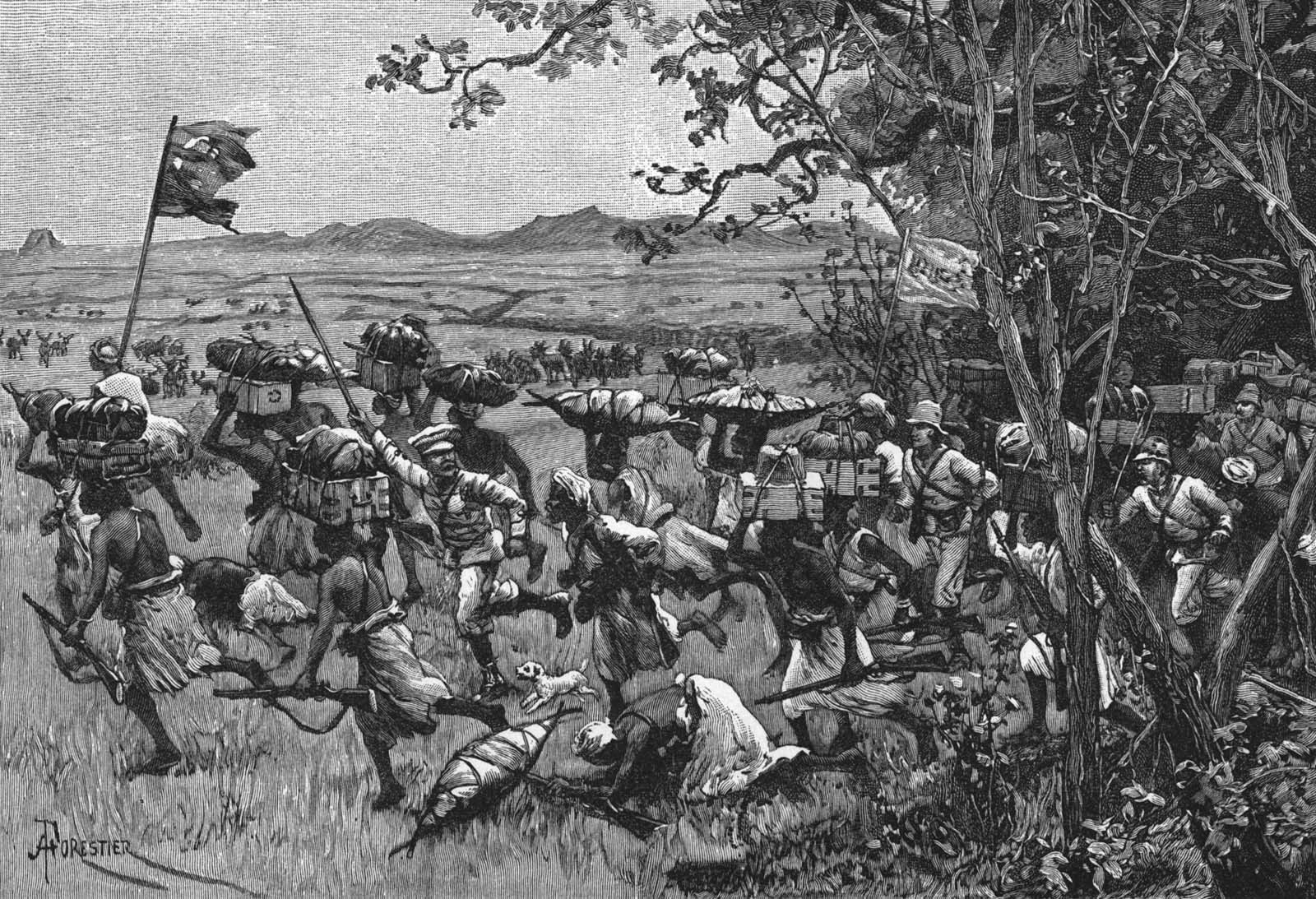
Jared Lobdell suggests that Edwardian adventure stories may derive ultimately from traveller's tales like Henry Morton Stanley's 1890 In Darkest Africa.

Lobdell proposes that The Lord of the Rings is "an adventure story in the Edwardian mode", supporting this with multiple parallels. The structure of the story, centred on Englishmen who travel abroad and find the world mysterious, and especially that the past is somehow alive in present time, is in Lobdell's view characteristic of the genre. The story is "frankly aristocratic in its conventions"; and there is a "self-deprecating tone" in the narration. He writes that since the narrator has to come home alive to tell his story, the "there and back again" framework is a simple consequence. Martin Simonson writes that characters like Sam Gamgee and Gandalf function as typical characters of "British imperial adventure novel[s] of the period, friends of the hero. Lobdell suggests that the origins of this type of adventure story are in novels of "wilderness adventure" like Fenimore Cooper's, and in actual travel adventures, such as those of the explorers Richard Francis Burton (1821–1890) and Henry Morton Stanley (1841–1904). Lobdell notes one possible objection, that the Edwardian adventure story was often a short novel, and eventually a short story, written in a few weeks. He says in reply that while Tolkien did take 25 years or more to write his novel, this was driven largely by his busy working life.

In the case of Arthur Conan Doyle's 1912 novel The Lost World, Lobdell describes parallels such as the way the group of travellers accidentally come together, helped by a professorial figure who accompanies them for only part of their adventure. The journey involves travelling to unknown lands, via a cave. The characterisation is basic, with "types" rather than characters that are developed in detail; one of the characters is an "eccentric omnicompetent" figure who solves many problems for the group. The protagonists come safely through all their adventures despite hazards from nature. Finally, the story is said to have been written by the most ordinary member of the group, providing a "common lens" though which the reader can view the "heroic experience".

Parallels identified by Jared Lobdell with Edwardian adventure stories
Parallel	Edwardian adventure story	The Lord of the Rings
Story "of Englishmen abroad in the wide and mysterious world"	"Triumph over nature" The Lost World	Hobbits "are Englishmen"
The past is "mysteriously alive in the present"	e.g. King Solomon's Mines, She, The Lost World	
"There and back again" framework	"Narrator has to return home ... to tell his story"	Both The Hobbit and The Lord of the Rings
For example, in The Lost World ...
Travellers assemble accidentally...	"or by the machinations of Professor Challenger" "who is not with them for the entire journey"	Gandalf, ditto
"Travel to unknown lands" ...	... via a cave (on way down)	... via Shelob's cave (on way up)
Protagonists "are types"	"Sportsman, Irish rugger, desiccated (but tough) professor, ... eccentric omnicompetent"	The Company of the Ring with "the eccentric omnicompetent, Gandalf"
Nature attacks the protagonists	"prehistoric animals"	Old Man Willow, snow at Caradhras
They come safely through	all 4	8 of the 9
Story is written by the most ordinary of the group	Edward Dunn Malone	Frodo Baggins, the "common lens for heroic experience"

== Post-war novelist ==
Julie Pridmore agrees that The Hobbit "would seem to owe much to the nineteenth and early twentieth-century Edwardian adventure story", but that The Lord of the Rings is more clearly modern, even if some scholars denied that connection. In particular, as Shippey has written, Tolkien is a "post-war writer"; Pridmore states that "Tolkien's heroes were never the great men of late Victorian and early Edwardian hero worship". Instead, in her view, he wrote about heroism in the actions of ordinary soldiers, represented by Frodo and Sam. She concludes that "the First World War ... separates Tolkien's heroes from the adventure heroes of the Victorians and Edwardians and makes The Lord of the Rings a twentieth-century text with twentieth-century questions about masculinity, heroism and hero-worship."

Anna Vaninskaya notes Lobdell's characterisation of Tolkien as a writer of Edwardian mode adventure stories, and that the modern authors who influenced him "were born before 1880". But on the other hand, she writes, Tolkien can equally well be seen as a writer responding to the trauma of the First World War, alongside James Joyce and T. S. Eliot, or one responding to the evil of the Second World War, like William Golding and George Orwell. And his use of post-modernist devices like metafiction, pastiche, and self-referentiality would imply, she writes, that his contemporaries include writers after 1950.

== Sources ==
- Auden, W. H. (31 October 1954). "The Hero Is a Hobbit". The New York Times.
- Buck, Claire (2013) [2007]. "Literary Context, Twentieth Century". In Drout, Michael D. C. (ed.). J.R.R. Tolkien Encyclopedia: Scholarship and Critical Assessment. Routledge. pp. 363–366. ISBN 978-0-415-86511-1.
- Carpenter, Humphrey (1978) [1977]. J. R. R. Tolkien: A Biography. Unwin Paperbacks. ISBN 978-0-04928-039-7.
- Carpenter, Humphrey, ed. (2023) [1981]. The Letters of J. R. R. Tolkien: Revised and Expanded Edition. New York: HarperCollins. ISBN 978-0-35-865298-4.
- Dickerson, Matthew; Evans, Jonathan (2006). Ents, Elves, and Eriador: The Environmental Vision of J.R.R. Tolkien. University Press of Kentucky. pp. 215–234. ISBN 0-8131-7159-8.
- Flieger, Verlyn (2005). Interrupted Music: The Making Of Tolkien's Mythology. Kent State University Press. ISBN 978-0-87338-824-5.
- Hooker, Mark T. (2006). Tolkienian Mathomium: A Collection of Articles on J. R. R. Tolkien and his Legendarium. Llyfrawr. ISBN 978-1-4382-4631-4.
- Hooker, Mark T. (2011). "Reading John Buchan in Search of Tolkien". In Fisher, Jason (ed.). Tolkien and the Study of his Sources: Critical Essays. McFarland. ISBN 978-0-7864-6482-1. OCLC 731009810.
- Kullmann, Thomas; Siepmann, Dirk (2021). Tolkien as a Literary Artist. Cham: Palgrave Macmillan. ISBN 978-3-030-69298-8.
- Lupoff, Richard A.; Stiles, Steve (2015). Edgar Rice Burroughs: Master of Adventure. London: Hachette UK. p. pt 135. ISBN 978-1-4732-0871-1. OCLC 932059522.
- Lobdell, Jared C. (2004) [1981 (England and Always: Tolkien's World of the Rings)]. The World of the Rings: Language, Religion, and Adventure in Tolkien. Open Court. ISBN 978-0-8126-9569-4.
- Muir, Edwin (1988). The Truth of Imagination: Some Uncollected Reviews and Essays. Aberdeen University Press. p. 121. ISBN 0-08-036392-X.
- Nelson, Dale J. (2006). "Haggard's She: Burke's Sublime in a popular romance". Mythlore (Winter–Spring).
- Nelson, Dale (2013) [2007]. "Literary Influences, Nineteenth and Twentieth Centuries". In Drout, Michael D. C. (ed.). J.R.R. Tolkien Encyclopedia: Scholarship and Critical Assessment. Routledge. pp. 366–377. ISBN 978-0-415-86511-1.
- Pridmore, Julie (2016). "Beyond the Somme: war, sacrifice and heroism in the writing of JRR Tolkien". TricTrac: Journal of World Mythology and Folklore. 9 (1): 98–110.
- Resnick, Henry (1967). "An Interview with Tolkien". Niekas: 37–47.
- Rogers, William N. II; Underwood, Michael R. (2000). "Gagool and Gollum: Exemplars of Degeneration in King Solomon's Mines and The Hobbit". In Sir George Clark (ed.). J. R. R. Tolkien and His Literary Resonances: Views of Middle-earth. Westport, Connecticut: Greenwood Publishing Group. pp. 121–132. ISBN 978-0-313-30845-1.
- Shippey, Tom (2001) [2000]. J. R. R. Tolkien: Author of the Century. HarperCollins. ISBN 978-0261-10401-3.
- Shippey, Tom (2005) [1982]. The Road to Middle-Earth (Third ed.). Grafton (HarperCollins). ISBN 978-0-261-10275-0.
- Simonson, Martin (2006). "Three is Company: Novel, Fairy Tale, and Romance on the Journey through the Shire". Tolkien Studies. 3 (1): 81–100. doi:10.1353/tks.2006.0029. ISSN 1547-3163 – via Project Muse.
- Smith, Ross (2006). "Tolkien the storyteller". English Today. 22 (1): 45–50. doi:10.1017/S0266078406001076.
- Tolkien, J. R. R. (1937). The Hobbit. United Kingdom: George Allen & Unwin.
- Vaninskaya, Anna (2020) [2014]. "Modernity: Tolkien and His Contemporaries". In Lee, Stuart D. (ed.). A Companion to J. R. R. Tolkien. Wiley Blackwell. pp. 350–366. ISBN 978-1119656029.
