= Influences on Tolkien =

Impacts on English writer and philologist

Tolkien influences timeline
Date	Influences	Elements
c. 1900	First World War; Battle of the Somme; Tanks	Mordor; Metal dragons at Gondolin
c. 1900	Edwardian adventure stories	English Hobbits travel Past is mysteriously alive
c. 1900	Victorian era	Bag End, Hobbit lifestyle
c. 1900	Modern literature William Morris; Rider Haggard's She	Dead Marshes, Mirkwood; Saruman shrivels, dies
c. 1800	Antiquarianism	Poems, maps, scripts, artwork, genealogy
c. 1600	Shakespeare; Macbeth	Prophecy of Witch-King's death
c. 1400	Late Medieval	Cosmology, magic, named weapons, heraldry, interlaced narrative
c. 1000	Early Medieval; Crist I Beowulf; Sigelwara	Eärendil, light Elves, Ents, Orcs; Rohan; Silmarils, Balrogs, Harad
c. 400	Romano-British; Temple of Nodens	Celebrimbor; Rings of Power; Dwarves
c. 100	Christianity; The One God; The Devil	Eru Ilúvatar; Melkor/Morgoth
c. 400 BC	Classical era Atlantis; Ring of Gyges; Orpheus and Eurydice; Oedipus; Prometheus	Númenor; The One Ring; Beren and Lúthien; Túrin Turambar; Fëanor
c. 1000 BC	Bronze to Iron Age; Uffington White Horse; Hallstatt culture	Rohan's horse-culture Barrow-wight's treasure
c. 5000 BC	Neolithic; Pile Houses of Europe; Barrows	Esgaroth (Lake-town); Barrow-downs
150 mya	Jurassic; Pterosaurs	The Nazgûl's Fell beasts

J. R. R. Tolkien's fantasy books on Middle-earth, especially The Lord of the Rings and The Silmarillion, drew on a wide array of influences including language, Christianity, mythology, archaeology, ancient and modern literature, and personal experience. He was inspired primarily by his profession, philology; his work centred on the study of Old English literature, especially Beowulf, and he acknowledged its importance to his writings.

He was a gifted linguist, influenced by Germanic, Celtic, Finnish, Slavic, and classical language and mythology. His fiction reflected his Christian beliefs and his early reading of adventure stories and fantasy books. Commentators have attempted to identify many literary and topological antecedents for characters, places and events in Tolkien's writings. Some writers were certainly important to him, including the Arts and Crafts polymath William Morris, and he undoubtedly made use of some real place-names, such as Bag End, the name of his aunt's home.

Tolkien stated that he had been influenced by his childhood experiences of the English countryside of Warwickshire and its urbanisation by the growth of Birmingham, and his personal experience of the First World War.

== Philology ==
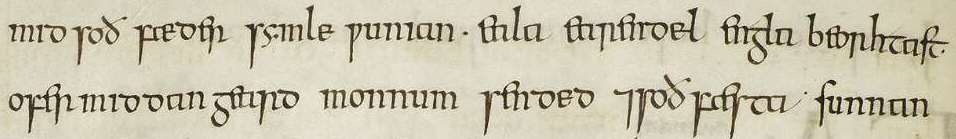
Ēala ēarendel engla beorhtast / ofer middangeard monnum sended, "Hail Earendel, brightest of angels, over Middle-earth to men sent" (second half of top line, first half of second line) - part of the poem Crist 1 in the Exeter Book, folio 9v, top, which inspired Tolkien to start his mythology

Imagemap with clickable links. Crist 1's influence on Tolkien's legendarium. It has been called "the catalyst for Tolkien's mythology".

Tolkien was a professional philologist, a scholar of comparative and historical linguistics. He was especially familiar with Old English and related languages. He remarked to the poet and The New York Times book reviewer Harvey Breit that "I am a philologist and all my work is philological"; he explained to his American publisher Houghton Mifflin that this was meant to imply that his work was "all of a piece, and fundamentally linguistic [sic] in inspiration. ... The invention of languages is the foundation. The 'stories' were made rather to provide a world for the languages than the reverse. To me a name comes first and the story follows."

=== Crist 1 ===
Tolkien began his mythology with the 1914 poem The Voyage of Earendel the Evening Star, inspired by the Old English poem Crist 1. Around 1915, he had the idea that his constructed language Quenya was spoken by Elves whom Eärendil meets during his journeys. From there, he wrote the Lay of Earendel, telling of Earendel and his voyages and how his ship is turned into the morning star. These lines from Crist 1 also gave Tolkien the term Middle-earth (translating Old English Middangeard). Accordingly, the medievalists Stuart D. Lee and Elizabeth Solopova state that Crist 1 was "the catalyst for Tolkien's mythology".

=== Beowulf ===
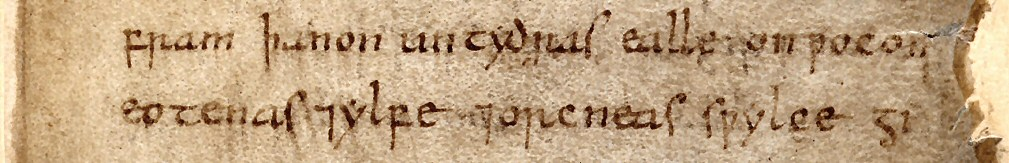
Beowulf's eotenas [ond] ylfe [ond] orcneas, "ogres [and] elves [and] devil-corpses" helped to inspire Tolkien to create orcs, Elves, and other races.

Tolkien was an expert on Old English literature, especially the epic poem Beowulf, and made many uses of it in The Lord of the Rings. For example, Beowulf's list of creatures, eotenas ond ylfe ond orcnéas, "ettens [giants] and elves and demon-corpses", contributed to his creation of some of the races of beings in Middle-earth, though with so little information about what elves were like, he was forced to combine scraps from all the Old English sources he could find.

He derived the Ents from a phrase in another Old English poem, Maxims II, orþanc enta geweorc, "skilful work of giants"; The Tolkien scholar Tom Shippey suggests that Tolkien took the name of the tower of Orthanc (orþanc) from the same phrase, reinterpreted as "Orthanc, the Ents' fortress". The word occurs again in Beowulf in the phrase searonet seowed, smiþes orþancum, "[a mail-shirt, a] cunning-net sewn, by a smith's skill": Tolkien used searo in its Mercian form *saru for the name of Orthanc's ruler, the wizard Saruman, incorporating the ideas of cunning and technology into Saruman's character. He made use of Beowulf, too, along with other Old English sources, for many aspects of the Riders of Rohan: for instance, their land was the Mark, a version of the Mercia where he lived, in Mercian dialect *Marc.

=== Sigelwara ===
Imagemap with clickable links. Tolkien's Sigelwara etymologies, leading to three strands in his writings on Middle-earth.

Several Middle-earth concepts may have come from the Old English word Sigelwara, used in the Codex Junius to mean "Aethiopian". Tolkien wondered why there was a word with this meaning, and conjectured that it had once had a different meaning, which he explored in detail in his essay "Sigelwara Land", published in two parts in 1932 and 1934. He stated that Sigel meant "both sun and jewel", the former as it was the name of the sun rune *sowilō (ᛋ), the latter from Latin sigillum, a seal. He decided that the second element was *hearwa, possibly related to Old English heorð, "hearth", and ultimately to Latin carbo, "soot". He suggested this implied a class of demons "with red-hot eyes that emitted sparks and faces black as soot". Shippey states that this "helped to naturalise the Balrog" (a demon of fire) and contributed to the sun-jewel Silmarils. The Aethiopians suggested to Tolkien the Haradrim, a dark southern race of men. (Note: In drafts of The Lord of the Rings, Tolkien toyed with names such as Harwan and Sunharrowland for Harad; Christopher Tolkien notes that these are connected to his father's Sigelwara Land.)

=== Nodens ===
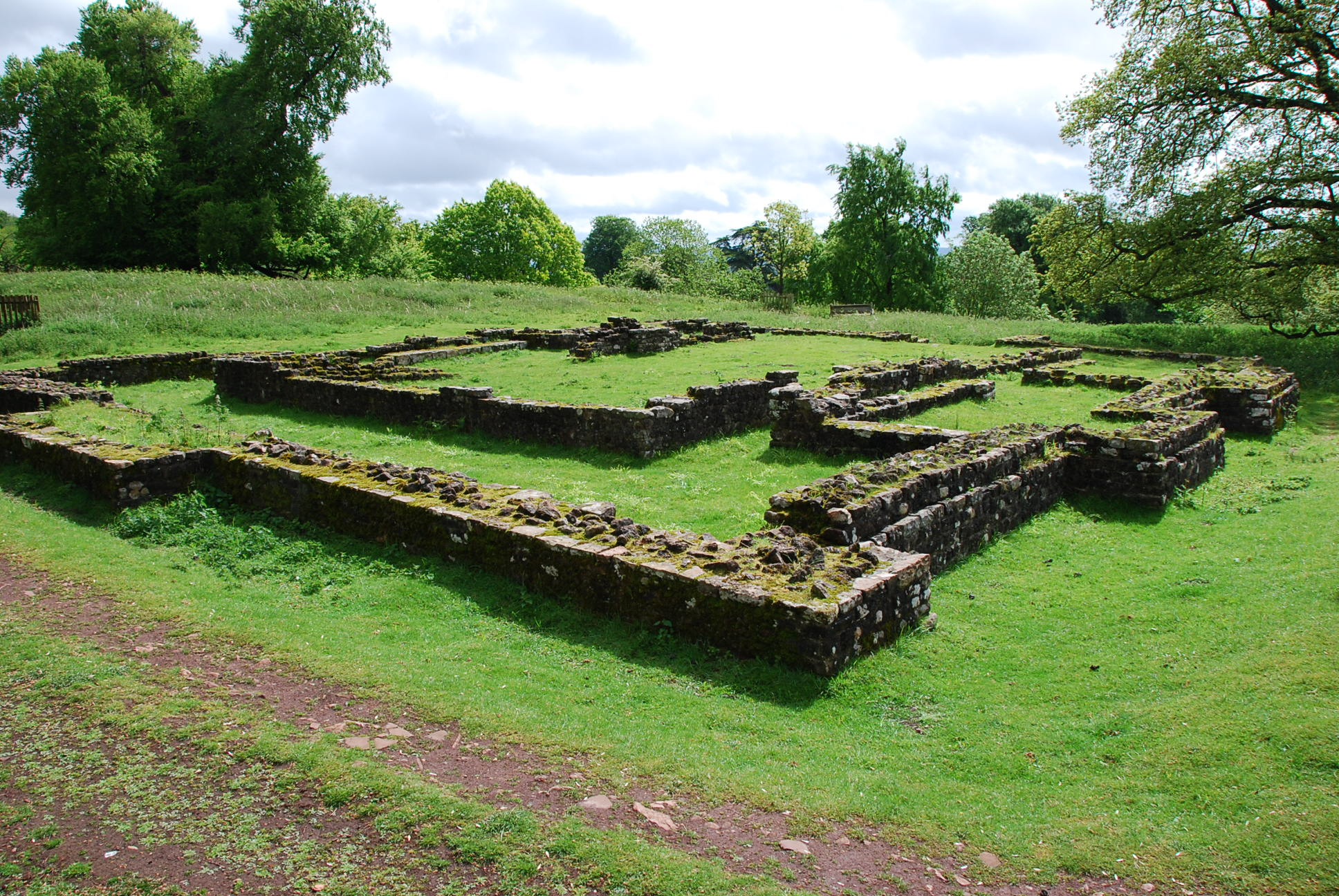
Tolkien visited the temple of Nodens at a place called "Dwarf's Hill" and translated an inscription with a curse upon a ring. It may have inspired his dwarves, Mines of Moria, rings, and Celebrimbor "Silver-Hand", an Elven-smith who contributed to Moria's construction.

In 1928, a 4th-century Romano-British cult temple was excavated at Lydney Park, Gloucestershire. Tolkien was asked to investigate a Latin inscription there: "For the god Nodens. Silvianus has lost a ring and has donated one-half [its worth] to Nodens. Among those who are called Senicianus do not allow health until he brings it to the temple of Nodens." The Anglo-Saxon name for the place was Dwarf's Hill, and in 1932 Tolkien traced Nodens to the Irish hero Nuada Airgetlám, "Nuada of the Silver-Hand".

Imagemap with clickable links. Apparent influence of archaeological and philological work at Nodens' Temple on Tolkien's Middle-earth legendarium

Shippey thought this "a pivotal influence" on Tolkien's Middle-earth, combining as it did a god-hero, a ring, dwarves, and a silver hand. The J.R.R. Tolkien Encyclopedia notes also the "Hobbit-like appearance of [Dwarf's Hill]'s mine-shaft holes", and that Tolkien was extremely interested in the hill's folklore on his stay there, citing Helen Armstrong's comment that the place may have inspired Tolkien's "Celebrimbor and the fallen realms of Moria and Eregion". The Lydney curator Sylvia Jones said that Tolkien was "surely influenced" by the site. The scholar of English literature John M. Bowers notes that the name of the Elven-smith Celebrimbor is the Sindarin for "Silver Hand", and that "Because the place was known locally as Dwarf's Hill and honeycombed with abandoned mines, it naturally suggested itself as background for the Lonely Mountain and the Mines of Moria."

== Christianity ==
Tolkien was a devout Roman Catholic. He once described The Lord of the Rings to his friend, the English Jesuit Father Robert Murray, as "a fundamentally religious and Catholic work, unconsciously so at first, but consciously in the revision." Many theological themes underlie the narrative, including the battle of good versus evil, the triumph of humility over pride, and the activity of grace, as seen with Frodo's pity toward Gollum. In addition the epic includes the themes of death and immortality, mercy and pity, resurrection, salvation, repentance, self-sacrifice, free will, justice, fellowship, authority and healing. Tolkien mentions the Lord's Prayer, especially the line "And lead us not into temptation but deliver us from evil" in connection with Frodo's struggles against the power of the One Ring. Tolkien said "Of course God is in The Lord of the Rings. The period was pre-Christian, but it was a monotheistic world", and when questioned who was the One God of Middle-earth, Tolkien replied "The one, of course! The book is about the world that God created – the actual world of this planet."

The Bible and traditional Christian narrative also influenced The Silmarillion. The conflict between Melkor and Eru Ilúvatar parallels that between Satan and God. Further, The Silmarillion tells of the creation and fall of the Elves, as Genesis tells of the creation and fall of Man. As with all of Tolkien's works, The Silmarillion allows room for later Christian history, and one version of Tolkien's drafts even has Finrod, a character in The Silmarillion, speculating on the necessity of Eru Ilúvatar's eventual incarnation to save Mankind. A specifically Christian influence is the notion of the fall of man, which influenced the Ainulindalë, the Kinslaying at Alqualondë, and the fall of Númenor.

== Mythology ==
=== Germanic ===
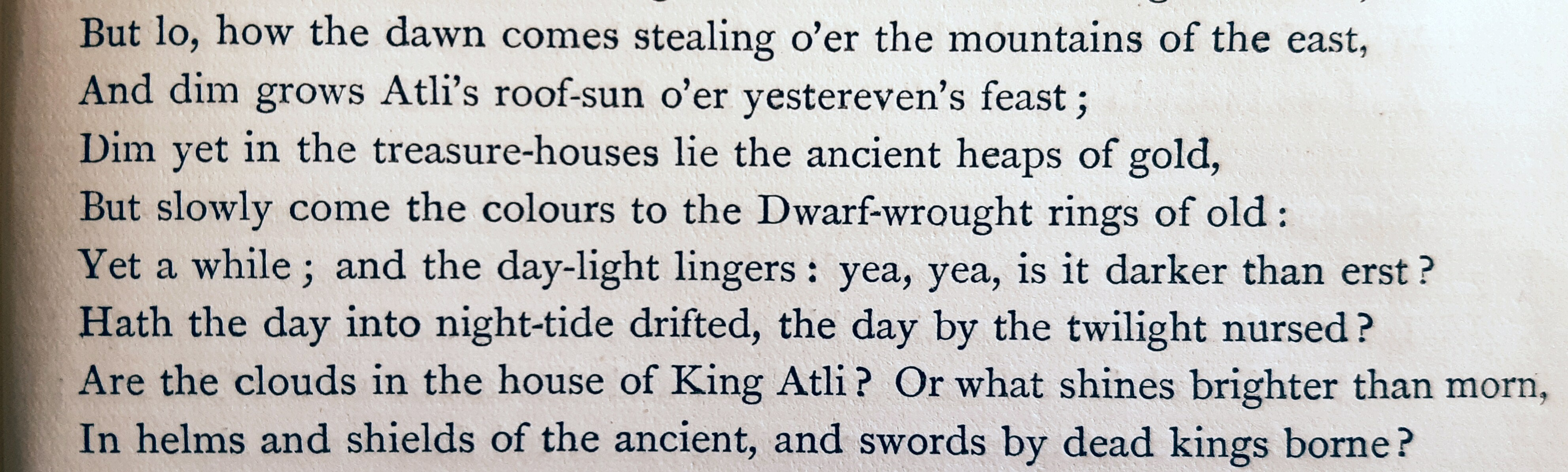
William Morris's Sigurd the Volsung told (in this extract from page 389) of Dwarf-Rings and swords carried by dead kings. Tolkien was familiar with the poem, and with Morris and Magnússon's prose translation.

Tolkien was influenced by Germanic heroic legend, especially its Norse and Old English forms. During his education at King Edward's School in Birmingham, he read and translated from the Old Norse in his free time. One of his first Norse purchases was the Völsunga saga. While a student, Tolkien read the only available English translation of the Völsunga saga, the 1870 rendering by William Morris of the Victorian Arts and Crafts movement and Icelandic scholar Eiríkur Magnússon. The Old Norse Völsunga saga and the Middle High German Nibelungenlied were coeval texts made with the use of the same ancient sources. Both of them provided some of the basis for Richard Wagner's opera series, Der Ring des Nibelungen, featuring in particular a magical but cursed golden ring and a broken sword reforged. In the Völsunga saga, these items are respectively Andvaranaut and Gram, and they correspond broadly to the One Ring and the sword Narsil (reforged as Andúril). The Völsunga saga also gives various names found in Tolkien. Tolkien's The Legend of Sigurd and Gudrún discusses the saga in relation to the myth of Sigurd and Gudrún.

Tolkien was influenced by Old English poetry, especially Beowulf; Shippey writes that this was "obviously" the work that had most influence upon him. The dragon Smaug in The Hobbit is closely based on the Beowulf dragon, the points of similarity including its ferocity, its greed for gold, flying by night, having a well-guarded hoard, and being of great age. Tolkien made use of the epic poem in The Lord of the Rings in many ways, including elements like the great hall of Heorot, which appears as Meduseld, the Golden Hall of the Kings of Rohan. The Elf Legolas describes Meduseld in a direct translation of line 311 of Beowulf (líxte se léoma ofer landa fela), "The light of it shines far over the land". The name Meduseld, meaning "mead hall", is itself from Beowulf. Shippey writes that the whole chapter "The King of the Golden Hall" is constructed exactly like the section of the poem where the hero and his party approach the King's hall: the visitors are challenged twice; they pile their weapons outside the door; and they hear wise words from the guard, Háma, a man who thinks for himself and takes a risk in making his decision. Both societies have a king, and both rule over a free people where, Shippey states, just obeying orders is not enough.

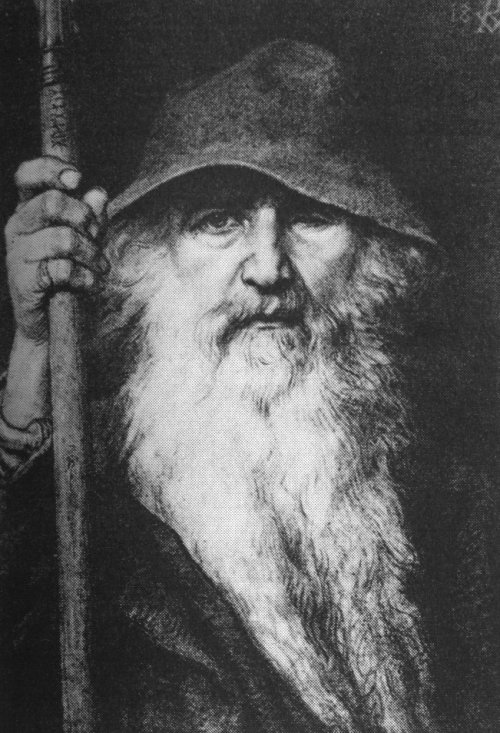
Tolkien wrote that he thought of Gandalf as an "Odinic Wanderer". Odin, the wanderer by Georg von Rosen, 1886

The figure of Gandalf is based on the Norse deity Odin in his incarnation as "The Wanderer", an old man with one eye, a long white beard, a wide brimmed hat, and a staff. Tolkien wrote in a 1946 letter that he thought of Gandalf as an "Odinic wanderer". The Balrog and the collapse of the Bridge of Khazad-dûm in Moria parallel the fire jötunn Surtr and the foretold destruction of Asgard's bridge, Bifröst. The "straight road" linking Valinor with Middle-Earth after the Second Age further mirrors the Bifröst linking Midgard and Asgard, and the Valar themselves resemble the Æsir, the gods of Asgard. Thor, for example, physically the strongest of the gods, can be seen both in Oromë, who fights the monsters of Melkor, and in Tulkas, the strongest of the Valar. Manwë, the head of the Valar, has some similarities to Odin, the "Allfather". The division between the Calaquendi (Elves of Light) and Moriquendi (Elves of Darkness) echoes the Norse division of light elves and dark elves. The light elves of Norse mythology are associated with the gods, much as the Calaquendi are associated with the Valar.

Some critics have suggested that The Lord of the Rings was directly derived from Richard Wagner's opera cycle, Der Ring des Nibelungen, whose plot also centres on a powerful ring from Germanic mythology. Others have argued that any similarity is due to the common influence of the Völsunga saga and the Nibelungenlied on both authors. Tolkien sought to dismiss critics' direct comparisons to Wagner, telling his publisher, "Both rings were round, and there the resemblance ceases." According to Humphrey Carpenter's biography of Tolkien, the author claimed to hold Wagner's interpretation of the relevant Germanic myths in contempt, even as a young man before reaching university. Some researchers take an intermediate position: that both the authors used the same sources, but that Tolkien was influenced by Wagner's development of the mythology, especially the conception of the Ring as conferring world mastery. Wagner probably developed this element by combining the ring with a magical wand mentioned in the Nibelungenlied that could give to its wearer the control over "the race of men". Some argue that Tolkien's denial of a Wagnerian influence was an over-reaction to statements about the Ring by Åke Ohlmarks, Tolkien's Swedish translator. Others believe that Tolkien was reacting against the links between Wagner's work and Nazism. (Note: The DVD of Peter Jackson's film of The Return of the King ends with a quotation of the Siegfried theme from the Ring of the Nibelungen; the scholar of film and film music Kevin J. Donnelly writes that the reference is ambiguous, being possibly a musical joke, perhaps a comment on the similarity of the two stories, or maybe an oblique allusion to "the troubling racial imaginary of Tolkien's world and Peter Jackson's trilogy of films". See also Music of The Lord of the Rings film series.)

=== Finnish ===
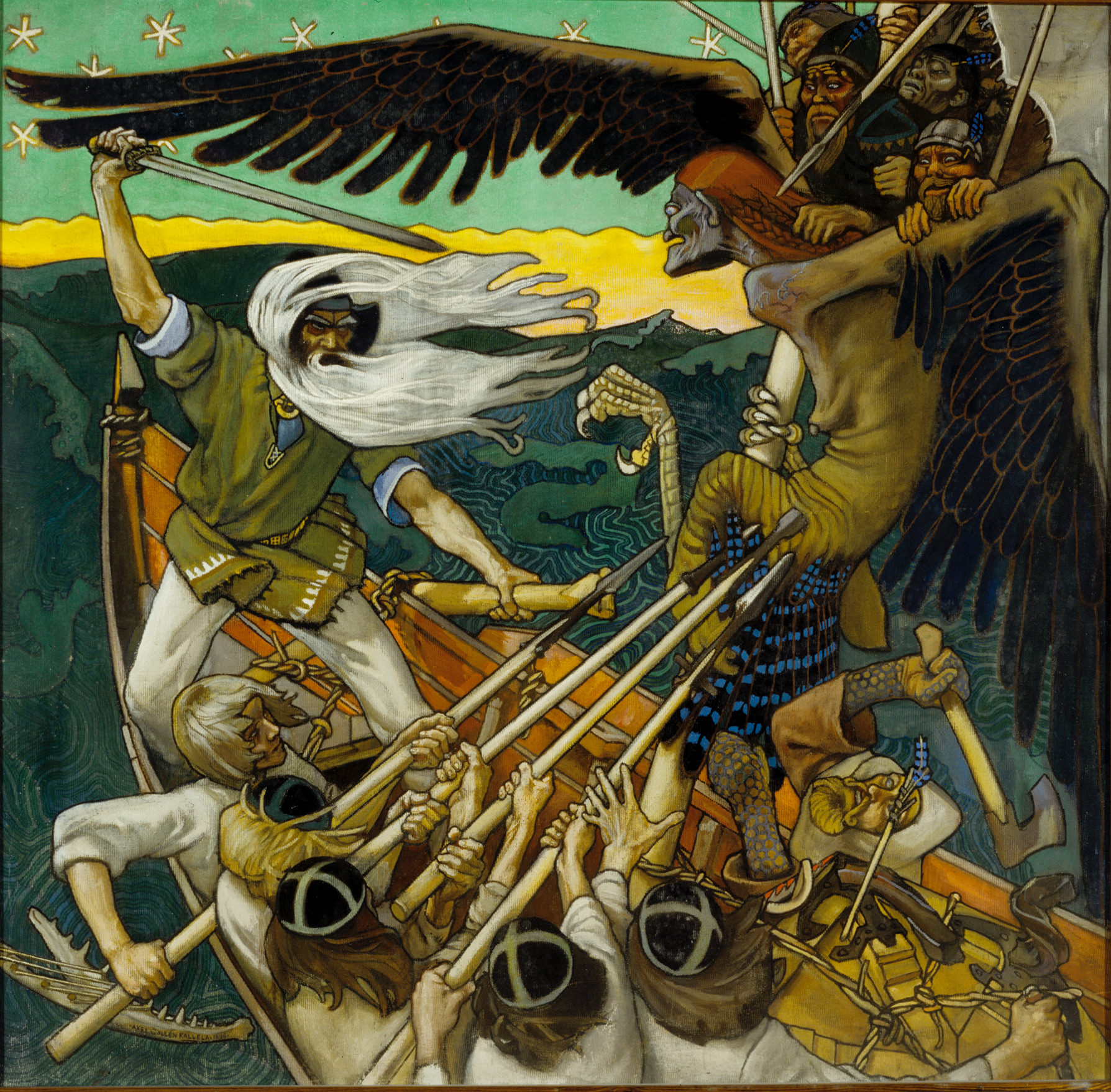
Tolkien may have made use of the Finnish epic poem Kalevala for some Middle-earth characters. Painting: The Defense of the Sampo, an adaptation of a scene from Kalevala, by Akseli Gallen-Kallela, 1896

Tolkien was "greatly affected" by the Finnish national epic Kalevala, especially the tale of Kullervo, as an influence on Middle-earth. He credited Kullervo's story with being the "germ of [his] attempt to write legends". He tried to rework the story of Kullervo into a story of his own, and though he never finished, similarities to the story can still be seen in the tale of Túrin Turambar. Both are tragic heroes who accidentally commit incest with their sister who on finding out kills herself by leaping into water. Both heroes later kill themselves after asking their sword if it will slay them, which it confirms.

Like The Lord of the Rings, the Kalevala centres around a magical item of great power, the Sampo, which bestows great fortune on its owner, but whose exact nature is never made clear; it has been considered a World pillar (Axis mundi) among other possibilities. Scholars including Randel Helms have suggested that the Sampo contributed to Tolkien's Silmarils that form a central element of his legendarium. Jonathan Himes has suggested further that Tolkien found the Sampo complex, and chose to split the Sampo's parts into desirable objects. The pillar became the Two Trees of Valinor with their Tree of life aspect, illuminating the world. The decorated lid became the brilliant Silmarils, which embodied all that was left of the light of the Two Trees, thus tying the symbols together.

Like the One Ring, the Sampo is fought over by forces of good and evil, and is ultimately lost to the world as it is destroyed towards the end of the story. The work's central character, Väinämöinen, shares with Gandalf immortal origins and wise nature, and both works end with the character's departure on a ship to lands beyond the mortal world. Tolkien also based elements of his Elvish language Quenya on Finnish. Other critics have identified similarities between Väinämöinen and Tom Bombadil.

=== Classical ===
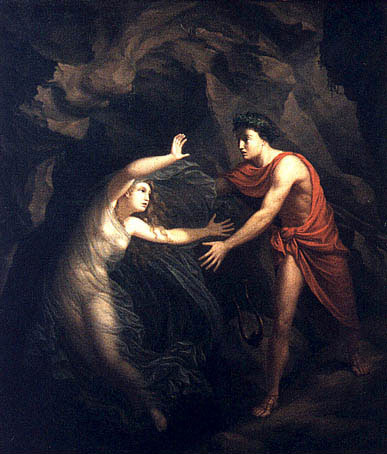
In the classical myth, Orpheus nearly rescues Eurydice from Hades, only for her to die a second death. In Tolkien's version, Lúthien plays Orpheus rather than Eurydice, three times rescuing Beren, and they enjoy a second life together.

Influence from Greek mythology is apparent in the disappearance of the island of Númenor, recalling Atlantis. Tolkien's Elvish name "Atalantë" for Númenor resembles Plato's Atlantis, furthering the illusion that his mythology simply extends the history and mythology of the real world. In his Letters, however, Tolkien described this merely as a "curious chance."

Classical mythology colours the Valar, who borrow many attributes from the Olympian gods. The Valar, like the Olympians, live in the world, but on a high mountain, separated from mortals; Ulmo, Lord of the Waters, owes much to Poseidon, and Manwë, the Lord of the Air and King of the Valar, to Zeus.

Tolkien compared Beren and Lúthien with Orpheus and Eurydice, but with the gender roles reversed. Oedipus is mentioned in connection with Túrin in the Children of Húrin, among other mythological figures:

There is the Children of Húrin, the tragic tale of Túrin Turambar and his sister Níniel – of which Túrin is the hero: a figure that might be said (by people who like that sort of thing, though it is not very useful) to be derived from elements in Sigurd the Volsung, Oedipus, and the Finnish Kullervo.

Fëanor has been compared with Prometheus by researchers such as Verlyn Flieger. They share a symbolical and literal association with fire, are both rebels against the gods' decrees and inventors of artefacts that were sources of light, or vessels to divine flame.

=== Celtic ===
==== Welsh and Irish ====
Classical, medieval, and recent influences on the geography and peoples of Middle-earth. All locations are approximate.

The extent of Celtic influence has been debated. Tolkien wrote that he gave the Elvish language Sindarin "a linguistic character very like (though not identical with) Welsh ... because it seems to fit the rather 'Celtic' type of legends and stories told of its speakers". Some names of characters and places in The Hobbit and The Lord of the Rings have Welsh origin; for instance, Crickhollow in the Shire recalls the Welsh placename Crickhowell, while the hobbit name Meriadoc has been suggested as an allusion to a legendary king of Brittany, though Tolkien denied any connection. In addition, the depiction of Elves has been described as deriving from Celtic mythology.

Tolkien wrote of "a certain distaste" for Celtic legends, "largely for their fundamental unreason", but The Silmarillion is thought by scholars to have some Celtic influence. The exile of the Noldorin Elves, for example, has parallels with the story of the Tuatha Dé Danann in Irish mythology. The Tuatha Dé Danann, semi-divine beings, invaded Ireland from across the sea, burning their ships when they arrived and fighting a fierce battle with the current inhabitants. The Noldor arrived in Middle-earth from Valinor and burned their ships, then turned to fight Melkor. Another parallel can be seen between the loss of a hand by Maedhros, son of Fëanor, and the similar mutilation suffered by Nuada Airgetlám / Llud llaw Ereint ("Silver Hand/Arm") during the battle with the Firbolg. Nuada received a hand made of silver to replace the lost one, and his later appellation has the same meaning as the Elvish name Celebrimbor: "silver fist" or "Hand of silver" in Sindarin (Telperinquar in Quenya).

Tolkien's 1955 O'Donnell lecture at Oxford, "English and Welsh," addresses Tolkien's love of the musicality of the Welsh language, which he states was an influence on the sounds of the Elvish language of Sindarin. He voiced his affinity for Welsh by stating, "Welsh is of this soil, this island, the senior language of the men of Britain; and Welsh is beautiful."

==== Arthurian legends ====
The Arthurian legends are part of the Celtic cultural heritage. Tolkien denied their influence, but critics have found several parallels. Authors such as Donald O'Brien, Patrick Wynne, Carl Hostetter, and Tom Shippey have pointed out similarities between the tale of Beren and Lúthien in The Silmarillion and Culhwch and Olwen, a tale in the Welsh Mabinogion. In both, the male heroes make rash promises after having been stricken by the beauty of non-mortal maidens; both enlist the aid of great kings, Arthur and Finrod; both show rings that prove their identities; and both are set impossible tasks that include, directly or indirectly, the hunting and killing of ferocious beasts (the wild boars, Twrch Trwyth and Ysgithrywyn, and the wolf Carcharoth) with the help of a supernatural hound (Cafall and Huan). Both maidens possess such beauty that flowers grow beneath their feet when they come to meet the heroes for the first time, as if they were living embodiments of spring. The Mabinogion was part of the Red Book of Hergest, a source of Welsh Celtic lore, which the Red Book of Westmarch, a supposed source of Hobbit-lore, probably imitates.

Gandalf has been compared with Merlin, Frodo and Aragorn with Arthur, and Galadriel with the Lady of the Lake. Flieger has investigated the correlations and Tolkien's creative methods. She points out visible correspondences such as Avalon and Avallónë, and Brocéliande and Broceliand, the original name of Beleriand. Tolkien himself said that Frodo's and Bilbo's departure to Tol Eressëa (also called "Avallon" in the Legendarium) was an "Arthurian ending". Such correlations are discussed in the posthumously published The Fall of Arthur; a section, "The Connection to the Quenta", explores Tolkien's use of Arthurian material in The Silmarillion. Another parallel is between the Arthurian tale of Sir Balin and that of Tolkien's Túrin Turambar. Though Balin knows he wields an accursed sword, he continues his quest to regain King Arthur's favour. Fate catches up with him when he unwittingly kills his own brother, who mortally wounds him. Turin accidentally kills his friend Beleg with his sword.

=== Slavic ===
There are a few echoes of Slavic mythology in Tolkien's novels, such as the names of the wizard Radagast and his home at Rhosgobel in Rhovanion; all three appear to be connected with the Slavic god Rodegast, a god of the sun, war, hospitality, fertility, and harvest. The Anduin, the Sindarin name for The Great River of Rhovanion, may be related to the Danube River, which flows mainly among the Slavic people and played an important role in their folklore.

== History ==
The Battle of the Pelennor Fields towards the end of The Lord of the Rings may have been inspired by a conflict of real-world antiquity. Elizabeth Solopova notes that Tolkien repeatedly referred to a historic account of the Battle of the Catalaunian Fields by Jordanes, and analyses the two battles' similarities. Both battles take place between civilisations of the "East" and "West", and like Jordanes, Tolkien describes his battle as one of legendary fame that lasted for several generations. Another apparent similarity is the death of king Theodoric I on the Catalaunian Fields and that of Théoden on the Pelennor. Jordanes reports that Theodoric was thrown off by his horse and trampled to death by his own men who charged forward. Théoden rallies his men shortly before he falls and is crushed by his horse. And like Theodoric, Théoden is carried from the battlefield with his knights weeping and singing for him while the battle still goes on.

== Literature ==
=== Shakespeare ===
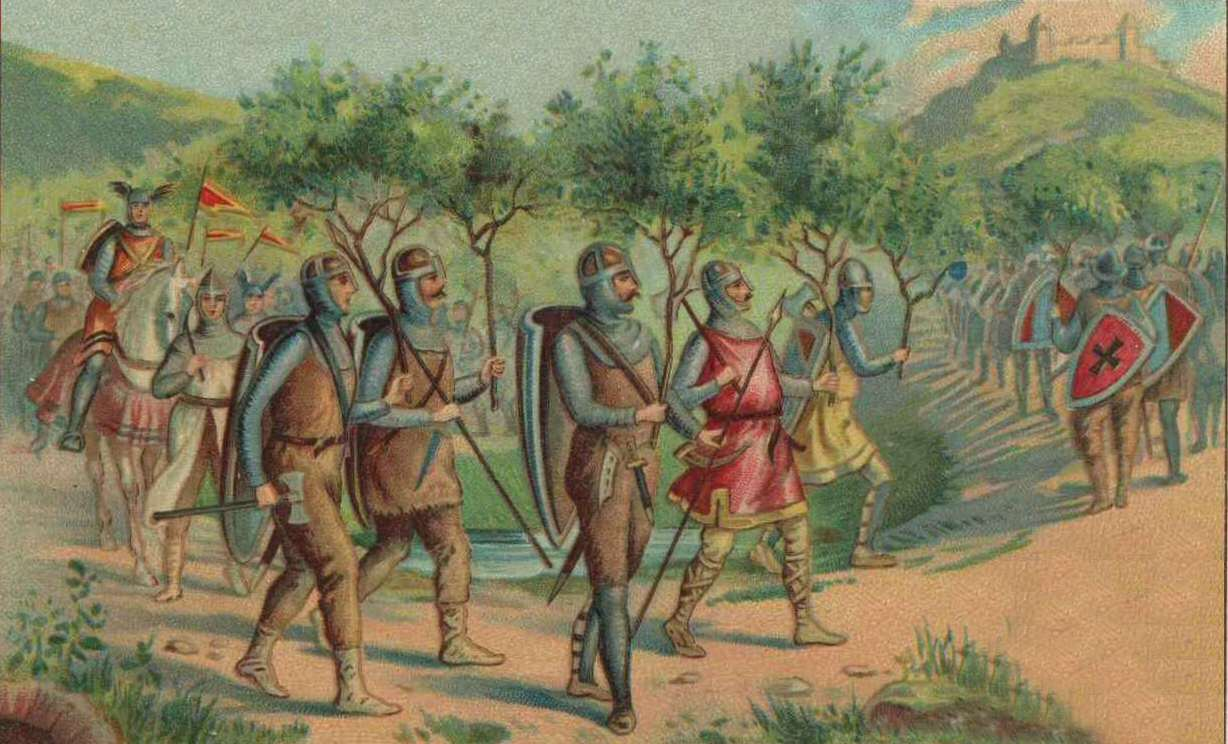
Birnam Wood comes to Dunsinane, as branches carried by soldiers, in Shakespeare's version. Tolkien found this deeply disappointing.

Shakespeare's influence on Tolkien was substantial, despite Tolkien's professed dislike of the playwright. Tolkien disapproved in particular of Shakespeare's devaluation of elves, and was deeply disappointed by the prosaic explanation of how Birnam Wood came to Dunsinane Hill in Macbeth. Tolkien was influenced especially by Macbeth and A Midsummer Night's Dream, and he used King Lear for "issues of kingship, madness, and succession". He arguably drew on several other plays, including The Merchant of Venice, Henry IV, Part 1, and Love's Labour's Lost, as well as Shakespeare's poetry, for numerous effects in his Middle-earth writings. The Tolkien scholar Tom Shippey suggests that Tolkien may even have felt a kind of fellow-feeling with Shakespeare, as both men were rooted in the county of Warwickshire.

=== Antiquarianism ===
Scholars including Nick Groom place Tolkien in the tradition of English antiquarianism, where 18th century authors like Thomas Chatterton, Thomas Percy, and William Stukeley created a wide variety of antique-seeming materials much as Tolkien did, including calligraphy, invented language, forged medieval manuscripts, genealogies, maps, heraldry, and a mass of invented paratexts such as notes and glossaries. Will Sherwood comments that these non-narrative elements "will all sound familiar as they are the techniques that [Tolkien] used to immerse readers into Arda." Sherwood argues that Tolkien intentionally set about improving on antiquarian forgery, eventually creating "the codes and conventions of modern fantasy literature".

=== Modern ===
Thomas Kullmann and Dirk Siepmann write that The Lord of the Rings imitates "epic poetry from ancient Greece, Ireland and England; early modern romances, folklore and fairy tales; rhetorical traditions and popular poetry", adding that the tradition Tolkien uses most is none of those, but the often overlooked influence of "nineteenth- and early twentieth-century novel-writing." Claire Buck, writing in the J.R.R. Tolkien Encyclopedia, explores his literary context, while Dale Nelson in the same work surveys 24 authors whose works are paralleled by elements in Tolkien's writings. Postwar literary figures such as Anthony Burgess, Edwin Muir, Philip Toynbee and the critic Colin Manlove variously sneered at The Lord of the Rings, but others like Naomi Mitchison and Iris Murdoch respected the work, and W. H. Auden championed it. Those early critics dismissed Tolkien as non-modernist. Later critics have placed Tolkien closer to the modernist tradition with his emphasis on language and temporality, while his pastoral emphasis is shared with First World War poets and the Georgian movement. Buck suggests that if Tolkien was intending to create a mythology for England, that would fit the tradition of English post-colonial literature and the many novelists and poets who reflected on the state of modern English society and the nature of Englishness.

Tolkien acknowledged a few authors of Edwardian adventure stories, such as John Buchan and H. Rider Haggard, as writing excellent stories. Tolkien stated that he "preferred the lighter contemporary novels", such as Buchan's. Critics have detailed resonances between the two authors. Auden compared The Fellowship of the Ring to Buchan's thriller The Thirty-Nine Steps. Nelson states that Tolkien responded rather directly to the "mythopoeic and straightforward adventure romance" in Haggard. Tolkien wrote that stories about "Red Indians" were his favourites as a boy; Shippey likens the Fellowship's trip downriver, from Lothlórien to Tol Brandir "with its canoes and portages", to James Fenimore Cooper's 1826 historical romance The Last of the Mohicans. Shippey writes that Éomer's riders of Rohan in the scene in the Eastemnet wheel and circle "round the strangers, weapons poised" in a way "more like the old movies' image of the Comanche or the Cheyenne than anything from English history".

When interviewed, the only book Tolkien named as a favourite was Rider Haggard's adventure novel She: "I suppose as a boy She interested me as much as anything—like the Greek shard of Amyntas [Amenartas], which was the kind of machine by which everything got moving." A supposed facsimile of this potsherd appeared in Haggard's first edition, and the ancient inscription it bore, once translated, led the English characters to She's ancient kingdom, perhaps influencing the Testament of Isildur in The Lord of the Rings and Tolkien's efforts to produce a realistic-looking page from the Book of Mazarbul. Critics starting with Edwin Muir have found resemblances between Haggard's romances and Tolkien's. Saruman's death has been compared to the sudden shrivelling of Ayesha when she steps into the flame of immortality.

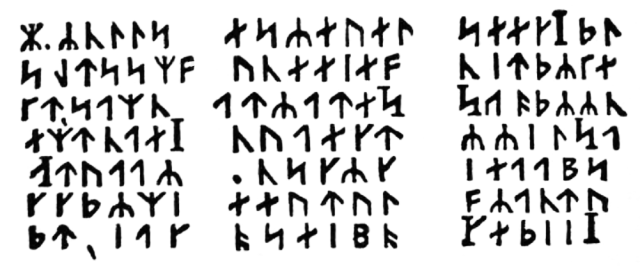
Verne's Runic Cryptogram from Journey to the Center of the Earth

Parallels between The Hobbit and Jules Verne's Journey to the Center of the Earth include a hidden runic message and a celestial alignment that direct the adventurers to the goals of their quests.

Tolkien wrote of being impressed as a boy by Samuel Rutherford Crockett's historical fantasy novel The Black Douglas and of using it for the battle with the wargs in The Fellowship of the Ring; critics have suggested other incidents and characters that it may have inspired, but others have cautioned that the evidence is limited. Tolkien stated that he had read many of Edgar Rice Burroughs' books, but denied that the Barsoom novels influenced his giant spiders such as Shelob and Ungoliant: "I developed a dislike for his Tarzan even greater than my distaste for spiders. Spiders I had met long before Burroughs began to write, and I do not think he is in any way responsible for Shelob. At any rate I retain no memory of the Siths or the Apts."

Charles Dickens' The Pickwick Papers has been shown to have reflections in Tolkien; for instance, Bilbo's birthday party speech recalls Pickwick's first speech to his group. William Morris was a major influence. Tolkien wished to imitate the style and content of Morris's prose and poetry romances, and made use of elements such as the Dead Marshes and Mirkwood. Another was the fantasy author George MacDonald, who wrote The Princess and the Goblin. Books by the Inkling author Owen Barfield contributed to his world-view, particularly The Silver Trumpet (1925), History in English Words (1926) and Poetic Diction (1928). Edward Wyke-Smith's Marvellous Land of Snergs, with its "table-high" title characters, influenced the incidents, themes, and depiction of Hobbits, as did the character George Babbitt from Babbitt. H. G. Wells's description of the subterranean Morlocks in his 1895 novel The Time Machine is suggestive of some of Tolkien's monsters.

== Personal experience ==
=== Childhood ===
Some locations and characters were inspired by Tolkien's childhood in rural Warwickshire, where from 1896 he first lived near Sarehole Mill, and later in Birmingham near Edgbaston Reservoir. There are also hints of the nearby industrial Black Country; he stated that he had based the description of Saruman's industrialization of Isengard and The Shire on that of England. (Note: The various tall towers in the Birmingham area, including Edgbaston Waterworks, Perrott's Folly and the University of Birmingham's clock tower, have repeatedly been suggested, without evidence, as possible inspirations for the towers in The Lord of the Rings.) The name of Bilbo's Hobbit-hole, "Bag End", was the real name of the Worcestershire home of Tolkien's aunt Jane Neave in Dormston.

=== War ===
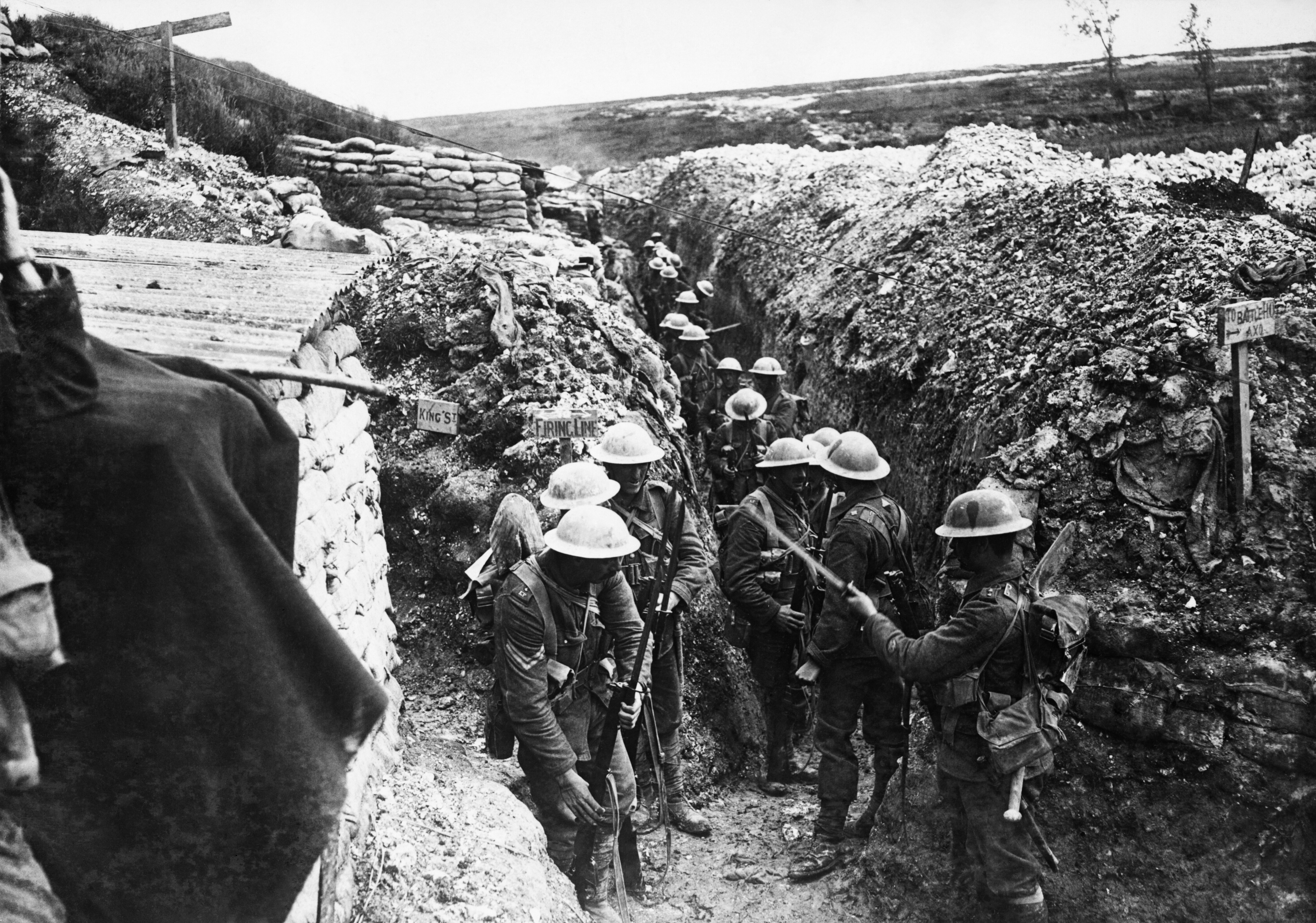
Tolkien stated that his trench warfare experience with his regiment, the Lancashire Fusiliers (pictured), on the Western Front in the First World War influenced his account of the landscape around Mordor.

On publication of The Lord of the Rings there was speculation that the One Ring was an allegory for the atomic bomb; Alan Nicholls wrote that "The closeness of its analogy to the human situation gives it a dreadful reality and relevance. It is a prose-poet's rendering of the mental twilight of the modern world, darkened as it is by the black power ... of the atom bomb". The poet and novelist Edwin Muir disagreed, writing that it could not directly equated with the hydrogen bomb, as it "seems to stand for evil itself". Tolkien insisted that the book was not allegorical, and pointed out that he had completed most of the book, including the ending, before the first use of atomic bombs. However, in a 1960 letter, he wrote that "The Dead Marshes [just north of Mordor] and the approaches to the Morannon [an entrance to Mordor] owe something to northern France after the Battle of the Somme", and, in the foreword to The Lord of the Rings, that the First World War was "no less hideous an experience" for its young participants than the Second. In September and October 1916, Tolkien took part in the Battle of the Somme as a signals officer, before being sent home with trench fever. Tolkien scholars agree that Tolkien responded to the war by creating his Middle-earth legendarium. Commentators have suggested multiple correspondences between Tolkien's wartime experiences and aspects of his Middle-earth writings. For example, the metallic dragons that attack the Elves in the final battle of The Fall of Gondolin are reminiscent of the newly-invented tanks that Tolkien saw. Tolkien's fellow-Inkling C. S. Lewis, who fought in the 1917 Battle of Arras, wrote that The Lord of the Rings realistically portrayed "the very quality of the war my generation knew", including "the flying civilians, the lively, vivid friendships, the background of something like despair and the merry foreground, and such heavensent windfalls as a cache of tobacco 'salvaged' from a ruin".

=== Inklings ===
Tolkien was a core member of the Inklings, an informal literary discussion group associated with the University of Oxford between the early 1930s and late 1949. The group shared in Colin Duriez's words "a guiding vision of the relationship of imagination and myth to reality and of a Christian worldview in which a pagan spirituality is seen as prefiguring the advent of Christ and the Christian story." Shippey adds that the group was "preoccupied" with "virtuous pagans", and that The Lord of the Rings is plainly a tale of such people in the dark past before Christian revelation. He further writes that what Tolkien called the Northern theory of courage, namely that even total defeat does not make what is right wrong, was "a vital belief" shared by Tolkien and other Inklings. The group considered philosophical issues, too, which found their way into Tolkien's writings, among them the ancient debate within Christianity on the nature of evil. Shippey notes Elrond's Boethian statement that "nothing is evil in the beginning. Even [the Dark Lord] Sauron was not so", in other words all things were created good; but that the Inklings, as evidenced by C. S. Lewis's Mere Christianity, book 2, section 2, to some extent tolerated the Manichean view that Good and Evil are equally powerful, and battle it out in the world. Shippey writes that Tolkien's Ringwraiths embody an Inkling and Boethian idea found in Lewis and Charles Williams, that of things being bent out of shape, the word wraith suggesting "writhe" and "wrath", glossed as "a twisted emotion"; even the world became bent, so men could no longer sail the old straight road westwards to the Undying Lands. All the same, Shippey writes, Tolkien's personal war experience was Manichean: evil seemed at least as powerful as good, and could easily have been victorious, a strand which can also be seen in Middle-earth. At a personal level, Lewis's friendship greatly encouraged Tolkien to keep going with The Lord of the Rings; he wrote that without Lewis "I should never have brought The L. of the R. to a conclusion."

== Sources ==
- Burns, Marjorie (2005). Perilous Realms: Celtic and Norse in Tolkien's Middle-earth. University of Toronto Press. ISBN 0-8020-3806-9.
- Byock, Jesse L. (1990). The Saga of the Volsungs: The Norse Epic of Sigurd the Dragon Slayer. University of California Press. ISBN 0-520-06904-8.
- Carpenter, Humphrey, ed. (2023) [1981]. The Letters of J. R. R. Tolkien: Revised and Expanded Edition. New York: HarperCollins. ISBN 978-0-35-865298-4.
- Carpenter, Humphrey (1978) [1977]. J. R. R. Tolkien: A Biography. Unwin Paperbacks. ISBN 978-0-04928-039-7.
- Carpenter, Humphrey (2000). J.R.R. Tolkien: A Biography. New York: Houghton Mifflin. ISBN 978-0618057023.
- Chance, Jane (2001). Tolkien's Art: A 'Mythology for England'. University Press of Kentucky. ISBN 0-8131-9020-7.
- Chance, Jane (2004). Tolkien and the Invention of Myth: A Reader. University Press of Kentucky. ISBN 0-8131-2301-1.
- Clark, George; Timmons, Daniel, eds. (2000). J. R. R. Tolkien and His Literary Resonances: Views of Middle-Earth. Greenwood Publishing Group. ISBN 0-313-30845-4.
- Croft, Janet Brennan (2004). War and the Works of J.R.R. Tolkien. Praeger. ISBN 978-0-313-32592-2. OCLC 52948909.
- Flieger, Verlyn (2002). Splintered Light: Logos and Language in Tolkien's World. Kent State University Press. ISBN 0-87338-744-9.
- Flieger, Verlyn (2005). Interrupted Music: The Making Of Tolkien's Mythology. Kent State University Press. ISBN 9780873388245.
- Garth, John (2003). Tolkien and the Great War: The Threshold of Middle-earth. Houghton Mifflin Harcourt. ISBN 978-0-618-57481-0.
- Hooker, Mark T. (2006). Tolkienian Mathomium: A Collection of Articles on J. R. R. Tolkien and his Legendarium. Llyfrawr. ISBN 978-1-4382-4631-4.
- Hooker, Mark T. (2011). "Reading John Buchan in Search of Tolkien". In Fisher, Jason (ed.). Tolkien and the Study of his Sources: Critical Essays. McFarland. ISBN 978-0-7864-6482-1. OCLC 731009810.
- Hooker, Mark T. (2014). The Tolkienaeum: Essays on J.R.R. Tolkien and his Legendarium. Llyfrawr. ISBN 978-1-49975-910-5.
- Kosalka, David (2011). Ghosts of Mythic Pasts: Mythic History in the Works of Friedrich Gundolf, Robert Graves, and JRR Tolkien in Light of the First World War. University of Wisconsin–Milwaukee (PhD thesis).
- Kullmann, Thomas; Siepmann, Dirk (2021). Tolkien as a Literary Artist. Cham: Palgrave Macmillan. ISBN 978-3-030-69298-8.
- Lee, Stuart D.; Solopova, Elizabeth (2005). The Keys of Middle-earth: Discovering Medieval Literature Through the Fiction of J. R. R. Tolkien. Palgrave. ISBN 978-1403946713.
- Libran-Moreno, Miryam (2011). "'Byzantium, New Rome!' Goths, Langobards, and Byzantium in 'The Lord of the Rings'". In Fisher, Jason (ed.). Tolkien and the Study of His Sources: Critical Essays. McFarland. pp. 85–115. ISBN 978-0-7864-8728-8.
- Lobdell, Jared C. (2004). The World of the Rings: Language, Religion, and Adventure in Tolkien. Open Court. ISBN 978-0-8126-9569-4.
- Shippey, Tom (2001) [2000]. J. R. R. Tolkien: Author of the Century. HarperCollins. ISBN 978-0261-10401-3.
- Shippey, Tom (2004). "Light-elves, Dark-elves, and Others: Tolkien's Elvish Problem". Tolkien Studies. 1 (1): 1–15. doi:10.1353/tks.2004.0015.
- Shippey, Tom (2005) [1982]. The Road to Middle-Earth (Third ed.). Grafton (HarperCollins). ISBN 978-0261102750.
- Shippey, Tom (2007). Roots and Branches: Selected Papers on Tolkien. Cormarë Series. Vol. 11. Walking Tree Publishers. ISBN 978-3-905703-05-4.
- Simek, Rudolf (2005). Mittelerde: Tolkien und die germanische Mythologie [Middle-earth: Tolkien and the Germanic Mythology] (in German). C. H. Beck. ISBN 978-3406528378.
- Solopova, Elizabeth (2009). Languages, Myths and History: An Introduction to the Linguistic and Literary Background of J. R. R. Tolkien's Fiction. New York City: North Landing Books. ISBN 978-0-9816607-1-4.
- Tolkien, J. R. R. (1954a). The Fellowship of the Ring. The Lord of the Rings. Boston: Houghton Mifflin. OCLC 9552942.
- Tolkien, J. R. R. (1977). Christopher Tolkien (ed.). The Silmarillion. Boston: Houghton Mifflin. ISBN 978-0-395-25730-2.
- Tolkien, J. R. R. (1984b). Christopher Tolkien (ed.). The Book of Lost Tales. Vol. 2. Boston: Houghton Mifflin. ISBN 0-395-36614-3.
- Tolkien, J. R. R. (1993). Christopher Tolkien (ed.). Morgoth's Ring. Boston: Houghton Mifflin. ISBN 0-395-68092-1.
- Williams, Hamish, ed. (2021). Tolkien and the Classical World. Zurich: Walking Tree Publishers. ISBN 978-3-905703-45-0. OCLC 1237352408.
