= Ork =

Ork or ORK may refer to:

- Ork (folklore), a mountain demon of Tyrol folklore
- Ork (video game), a 1991 game for the Amiga and Atari ST systems
- Ork (Warhammer 40,000), a fictional species in the Warhammer 40,000 universe
- Ork!, a 2001 role-playing game
- Cork Airport (IATA: ORK) in Ireland
- Orkney Islands
- Ork, a character in the book The Scarecrow of Oz by L. Frank Baum
- Ork, the home planet of the character Mork in the American television series Mork & Mindy

== Orc ==
- An alternate spelling of orc, the name of a fantasy creature popularized by J. R. R. Tolkien
- An alternate spelling of orc (slang), a pejorative term used in Ukraine for a Russian soldier in the Russo-Ukrainian War

== See also ==
- 90482 Orcus, Anti-Pluto, a trans-Neptunian object from the Kuiper belt with a large moon
- Orc (disambiguation)
