= Orc (disambiguation) =

An orc is a mythological and fictional creature, especially in Tolkien's The Lord of the Rings.

Orc or ORC may also refer to:

== Fictional monsters and races ==
- Orc (Blake), a character in the work of William Blake
- Orc (Warcraft)
- Orc (Warhammer)
- l'Orco, a sea monster in the poem Orlando Furioso
- Orsimer, or orcs, in The Elder Scrolls video games

== Acronyms ==
- O.R.C., postnominal letters for members of the Canons Regular of the Holy Cross of Coimbra
- ORC License, the Open RPG Creative License
- Odd radio circle, unexplained astronomical object
- Odonata Records Committee, verifies dragonflies in the UK
- Offshore Racing Congress, for maritime yacht racing
- Offshore Raiding Craft, a boat operated by the Royal Marines
- Ohio Revised Code, statutes of the U.S. state of Ohio
- Opinion Research Corporation, a polling and market research company
- Order of Railway Conductors, an American trade union
- Organic Rankine Cycle
- Organized retail crime
- Origin recognition complex, a protein complex
- Otago Regional Council, New Zealand
- Ottawa Rowing Club, a Canadian rowing club
- Olivos Rugby Club, an Argentine rugby union club

== Transport ==
- ORC, Amtrak station code for Oregon City (Amtrak station), Oregon, United States
- ORC, IATA airport code for Orocue Airport, Orocue, Colombia
- ORC, MRT station abbreviation for Orchard MRT station, Singapore
- Ottoman Railway Company

== Other uses ==
- Apache ORC, a file format
- Orc (album), an album by Oh Sees
- Orc (programming language)
- Orcs: First Blood, a series of books by Stan Nicholls
- Orc (sometimes romanized as Ork), a pejorative term used in Ukraine for a Russian soldier in the Russo-Ukrainian War

== See also ==
- Ork (disambiguation)
- Orca
