= AUK =

Auk or AUK may refer to:

== Auk ==
- Auk, a type of bird
- The Auk, now Ornithology, an American ornithological journal
- "The Auk", nickname of Claude Auchinleck (1884–1981), British field marshal
- Auk oilfield, near Aberdeen, Scotland

== AUK ==
=== Universities ===
- Agriculture University, Kota, Rajasthan, India
- The American University of Kurdistan, Dohuk, Iraq
- American University in Kosovo, part of the Rochester Institute of Technology
- American University of Kuwait, a non-profit university in Kuwait

=== Other uses ===
- AUK CORP, a Korean semiconductor and optoelectronic manufacturer
- AETN UK, a joint venture of A&E Television Networks and British Sky Broadcasting
- Audax UK, a cycling organisation
- AUK, IATA code for Alakanuk Airport in the Kusilvak Census Area, Alaska
- AUK, a shortening of the name of modern Heathen organisation based in the United Kingdom, Asatru UK

== See also ==
- AWK (disambiguation)
