= Orc (slang) =

Pejorative term for Russian soldiers

Orc (Cyrillic: орк, romanised: ork), plural orcs (Russian: орки, romanized: orki, Ukrainian: орки, romanized: orky), is a pejorative commonly used in Ukraine to refer to a Russian soldier participating in the Russian-Ukrainian War and Russian citizens who support the aggression of Russia against Ukraine. The pejorative serves to symbolize the inhuman wickedness and brutality of the invaders. It references the orcs, a fictional race of humanoid monsters from J. R. R. Tolkien's fantasy novel The Lord of the Rings.

== Usage ==
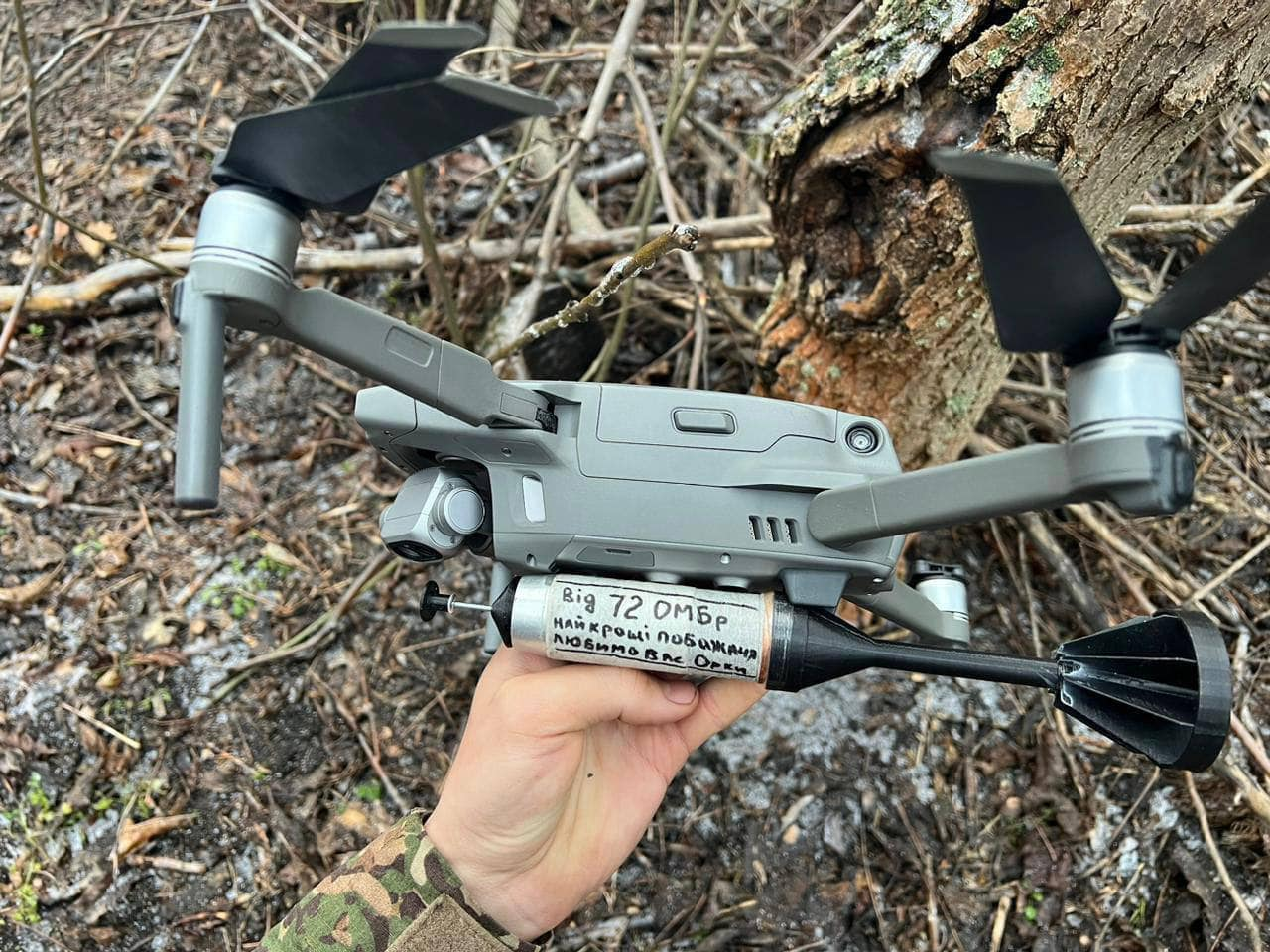
Ukrainian quadcopter drone-based bomber with an attached bomb. The inscription on the bomb's casing says: "From 72nd brigade / best wishes / love you orcs"

Comparisons of Vladimir Putin's Russian regime and its security services to the evil necromancer Sauron, his domain of Mordor, and orcs were made at least as early as 2009 by a Russian-American blogger and 2012 by Russian journalist Leonid Bershidsky.

Since the beginning of the Russo-Ukrainian War in 2014, Ukrainians have used the term to as a pejorative for Russian forces. During the Russian invasion of Ukraine in 2022, Ukrainians began to massively use the term "orcs" in relation to Russian military personnel and their war crimes. Al Jazeera English and Politico included the term as an example of the "new language of war in Ukraine".

The term is used by Ukrainian senior officials, the military and the media. For example, in early March 2022, in the Russian-occupied city of Melitopol, demonstrators protested against "orc looting". On April 8, the chairman of the Sumy Regional State Administration, Dmytro Zhyvytskyi, announced that his region was now "free of orcs". The Mayor of Makariv Vadym Tokar followed him the next day, he stated that the bodies of 132 civilians were found and that they were "killed by Russian orcs".

== Analysis ==
Calling Russian soldiers "orcs" has been described as an example of dehumanization.

The Spectator compared the "brutality and chaos" of the Russian troops to Tolkien's orcs and noted that the use of this term may not be just an accidental insult, but the result of drawing an analogy between the Middle-earth conflict and the real world.

== See also ==
- The Great War and Middle-earth
- The Last Ringbearer
- Moskal
- Vatnik
