= J. R. R. Tolkien: A Biography =

1977 biography by Humphrey Carpenter

- Dust wrapper of first edition
- Author: Humphrey Carpenter
- Language: English
- Subject: Biography
- Publisher: George Allen & Unwin
- Publication date: 5 May 1977
- Publication place: United Kingdom
- Pages: 330
- ISBN: 978-0-04-928037-3
- OCLC: 16381273

J. R. R. Tolkien: A Biography, written by Humphrey Carpenter, was first published in 1977. It is called the "authorized biography" of J. R. R. Tolkien, creator of The Hobbit and The Lord of the Rings. It was first published in London by George Allen & Unwin, then in the United States by Houghton Mifflin Company. It has been reprinted many times since.

== Book ==
=== Synopsis ===
Carpenter begins with a visit to Tolkien. He then describes Tolkien's early years, from South Africa to Birmingham and Oxford, and Tolkien's experience of fighting in the trenches of Northern France. He then explores how the legendarium came into being, from the Book of Lost Tales in 1917 onwards. The story of how Tolkien came to write The Hobbit, with the famous first line "In a hole in the ground there lived a hobbit", is set in the context of life at the University of Oxford, Tolkien's love of language, and his developing skill as a storyteller. Carpenter then looks at how the "new Hobbit", its successor The Lord of the Rings, took shape, and Tolkien's increasing fame in the 1960s. The narrative ends with an account of his final years.

Appendices provide a family tree, a chronology, and a list of published writings.

=== Publication history ===
The biography was first published by George Allen & Unwin in London in 1977. It was repeatedly reprinted that year, in 1978, in 1987 by both Unwin and by Houghton Mifflin in the US, and many times since. It has been translated into languages including French (C. Bourgeois, 1980), German (Klett-Cotta, 1979), Polish (Wydawnictwo ALFA-WERO, 1997), Russian (ĖKSMO-Press, 2002), and Spanish (Minotauro, 1990).

== Reception ==
The Tolkien scholar Tom Shippey writes that even though the biography came out before most of the posthumous publications edited by Christopher Tolkien, "it has worn very well," telling of Tolkien's "sad and traumatic youth" and providing good coverage of his dealings with C. S. Lewis and his publishers. August J. Fry reviewed the book for Christianity & Literature, and Anthea Lawson reviewed it for The Observer in 2002.

Charles E. Lloyd reviewed the book for the Sewanee Review in 1978, writing that Carpenter "reveals an affecting remarkable life without interposing between reader and subject personal predilections or self-advertisement." Lloyd states that the effect is to present Tolkien as a "very ordinary, even obscure, professor." He cites, too, Carpenter's mention that Tolkien "disapproved of biography as an aid to literary appreciation," agreeing that this may have been correct, with the two famous works telling what readers most need to know about Tolkien, but adding that it is helpful to know that Tolkien liked ordinary working men, like the batmen who served officers in the First World War trenches. Lloyd finds Carpenter's account of Tolkien's youth "gripping and astounding", and extremely good on his friendships and Catholicism.
