= The Great War and Middle-earth =

Effect on Tolkien's legendarium

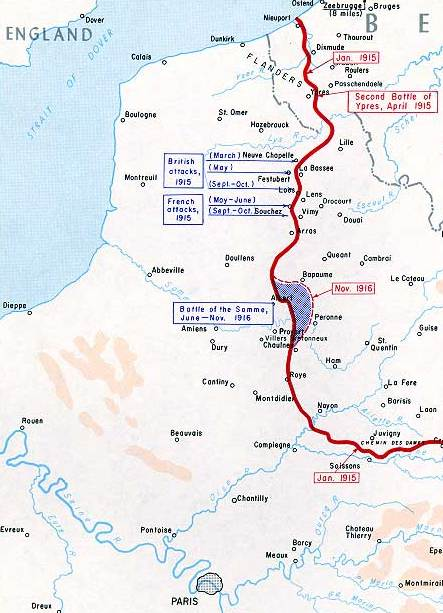
The northern part of the Western front 1915–16, showing the Battle of the Somme where J. R. R. Tolkien saw action

J. R. R. Tolkien took part in the First World War, known then as the Great War, and began his fantasy Middle-earth writings at that time. The Fall of Gondolin was the first prose work that he created after returning from the front, and it contains detailed descriptions of battle and streetfighting. He continued the dark tone in much of his legendarium, as seen in The Silmarillion. The Lord of the Rings, too, has been described as a war book.

Tolkien was reluctant to explain influences on his writing, specifically denying that The Lord of the Rings was an allegory of the Second World War, but admitting to certain connections with the Great War. His friend and fellow-Oxford University literary discussion group Inkling C. S. Lewis however described the work as having just the quality of the Great War in many of its descriptions.

Biographers and scholars including John Garth and Janet Brennan Croft have suggested multiple specific correspondences and the war's likely influences on Tolkien's work, including in The Hobbit, The Lord of the Rings, The Silmarillion, and Tolkien's poetry.

Dome Karukoski's 2019 biographical drama film Tolkien visually links the Great War to Middle-earth by depicting Tolkien with trench fever hallucinating scenes from his future books. Some critics found this at best a reductive approach to literature.

== Context ==
J. R. R. Tolkien (1892–1973) was an English Roman Catholic writer, poet, philologist, and academic, best known as the author of the high fantasy works The Hobbit and The Lord of the Rings. The Great War, later called the First World War, broke out in 1914. Among other nations, Britain and France fought Germany, resulting in a long and bloody period of trench warfare in northeastern France.

Tolkien was attached to the Lancashire Fusiliers who fought in the Battle of the Somme from September 1916. Tolkien's battalion stayed in reserve for the first week. It went into action at Ovillers, Tolkien's company again staying in reserve to carry supplies. Tolkien became battalion signals officer and often worked close to the front line. The battalion helped to win the Battle of Thiepval Ridge in late September, and took part in the capture of Regina Trench in late October. On 25 October, he went down with trench fever, and was sent home a fortnight later.

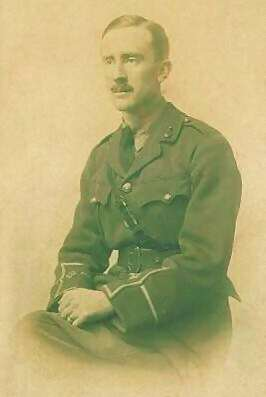
Tolkien in uniform, 1916

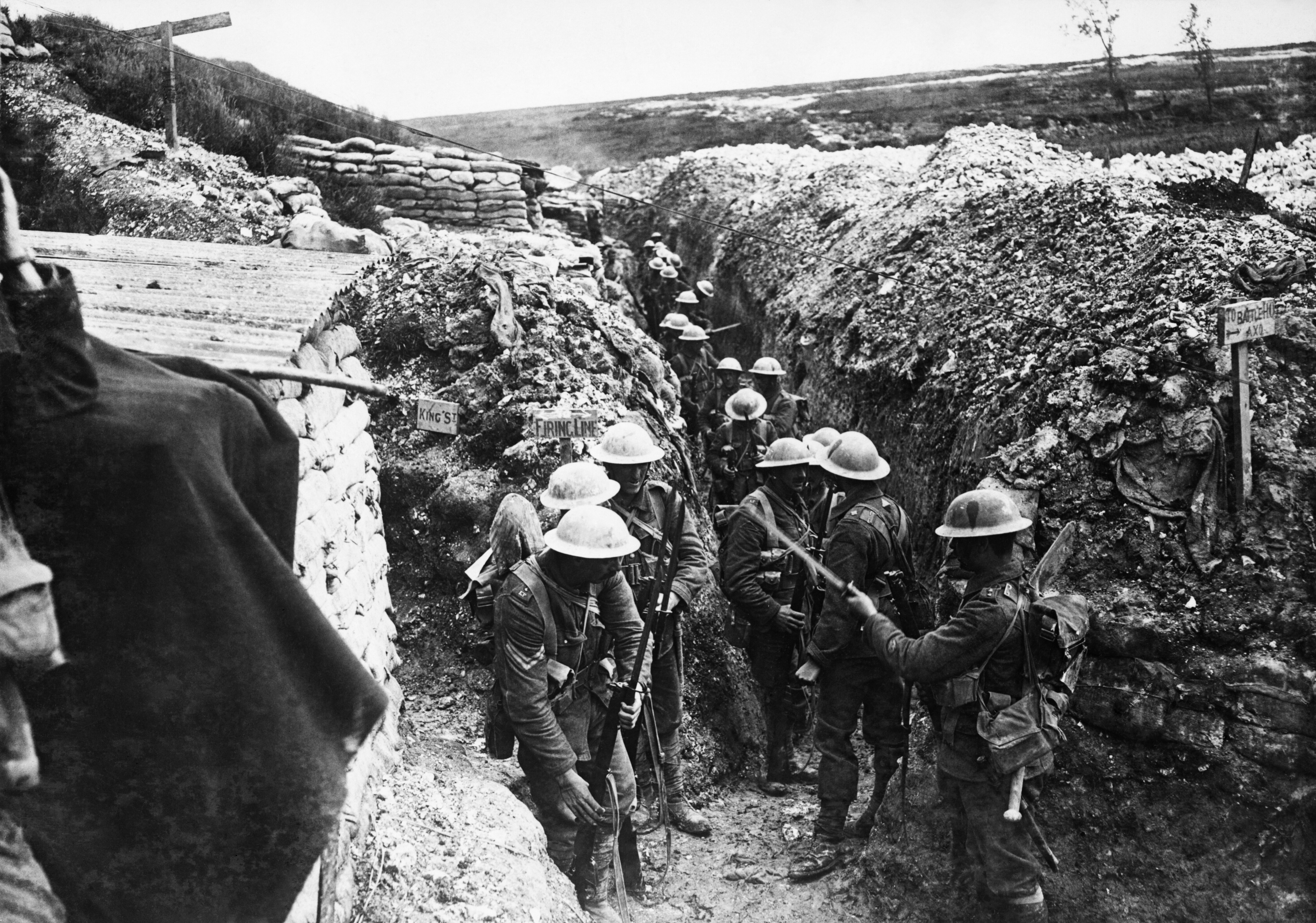
Tolkien experienced trench warfare with the Lancashire Fusiliers (pictured), on the Western Front in 1916.

== Responding to war with fantasy ==
The Tolkien scholar Tom Shippey writes that "The Lord of the Rings in particular is a war-book ... framed by and responding to the crisis of Western civilisation, 1914–1945". The scholar of literature David Kosalka similarly writes that Tolkien created his mythology, as the poets and novelists Friedrich Gundolf and Robert Graves did to a lesser extent, to find meaning for his Great War experiences. In his view, they adapted the Romanticist 19th century approach to myth to create mythic histories that addressed what they had encountered in the war. The Lord of the Rings, he suggests, shows how the modern world could engage with myth to address "modern decay". Shippey comments that it is not obvious why multiple English and American authors including Tolkien should have chosen to share their experiences through fantasy, but that they did so. He gives as examples William Golding with his 1954 Lord of the Flies and his 1955 The Inheritors; T. H. White with his 1958 The Once and Future King; George Orwell, in his 1945 novella Animal Farm; and Kurt Vonnegut, in his 1966 Slaughterhouse-Five. All, Shippey writes, had "an evidently realistic, serious, non-escapist, contemporary theme", and Tolkien, who had been accused of escapism, "belongs in this group". Shippey states that Tolkien wrote repeatedly in his mythology of the "Path of Dreams" and the "Great Escape from Death", but that he "never gave way" to the temptation to escape into fantasy.

Tolkien's wartime experiences were studied by the author John Garth in his 2003 book Tolkien and the Great War. Garth analyses the effect of the war on Tolkien, arguing that far from being escapism, his legendarium, including The Silmarillion, "reflects the impact of the war". Garth begins by noting that "Tolkien produced a mythology, not a trench memoir. Middle-earth contradicts the prevalent view of literary history, that the Great War finished off the epic and heroic traditions in any serious form". He describes how Tolkien went against the tide of modernism followed by the war poets, preferring romances and epic adventures from writers like William Morris and Rider Haggard, and medieval poetry such as Beowulf. Garth writes that Tolkien chose to use a "high diction", something that he knew could be abused, and created an "even-handed depiction of war as both terrible and stirring". He notes that the fact that Tolkien personally "saw battle ... may explain the central or climactic role of battles in his stories". Evidence for this view, Garth suggests, includes the "tank-like 'dragons' in the assault on Gondolin", the critical importance of timing in Middle-earth battles, the catastrophic failure of units to co-ordinate effectively in the Battle of Unnumbered Tears, and the arrival of a rescuing force at the last moment, all directly reflecting what Tolkien had seen for himself on the Somme. In Garth's view,

The war imposed urgency and gravity, took [Tolkien] through terror, sorrow, and unexpected joy, and reinvented the real world in a strange, extreme form. Without the war, it is arguable whether his fictions would have focused on a conflict between good and evil; or if they had, whether good and evil would have taken a similar shape. The same may be said for his thoughts on death and immortality, dyscatastrophe and eucatastrophe, enchantment and irony, the significance of fairy-story, the importance of ordinary people in events of historic magnitude, and, crucially, the relationship between language and mythology.

Tolkien's legendarium "assumed the dimensions of a conflict between good and evil immediately after the Somme", writes Garth. He suggests that Tolkien may have chosen to write in that way to express an experience beyond the conventional literary range.

Verlyn Flieger likened poems by Tolkien and his friend G. B. Smith, killed in the war, suggesting that Tolkien saw both as war-poems.
Part of Tolkien's "The Sea-Bell"

I walked by the sea, and there came to me,
as a star-beam on the wet sand,
a white shell like a sea-bell;
trembling it lay in my wet hand ...

Then I saw a boat silently float
On the night-tide, empty and grey ...

G. B. Smith's "The House of Eld"

Now the old winds are wild about the house,
And the old ghosts cry to me from the air
Of a far isle set in the western sea,
And of the evening sunlight lingering there.

Ah! I am bound here, bound and fettered,
The dark house crumbles, and the woods decay,
I was too fain of life, that bound me here;
Away, old long-loved ghosts, away, away!

The Tolkien scholar Verlyn Flieger writes that Tolkien spoke in his fairy tale world not only out of his own wartime experience, but out of that of his dead TCBS (Note: Tea Club and Barrovian Society, a small literary club at Tolkien's school.) school-friends Smith and Gilson. She discusses Tolkien's "haunting" poem "The Sea-Bell", initially called "Looney" and later labelled "Frodo's Dreme", where a lone traveller, possibly Frodo, goes on a bewildering journey to the distant shores of Faërie, and returns to find himself a stranger to his own people. Flieger notes the similarity of tone of "The Sea-Bell" to a fragmentary poem, "The House of Eld", in the little collection Tolkien made of Smith's poetry, suggesting that Tolkien associated both poems with the war. She observes that war and fairy-stories "would seem to be opposites", something that might appear to imply that going into Faërie would be escapism, and indeed the historian Hugh Brogan described Tolkien's The Book of Lost Tales and other Middle-earth writings as "therapy for a mind wounded in war". She writes, however, that:

War and Faërie have a certain resemblance to one another. Both are set beyond the reach of ordinary human experience. Both are equally indifferent to the needs of ordinary humanity. Both can change those who return so that they become 'pinned in a kind of ghostly deathlessness', not just unable to say where they have been but unable to communicate to those who have not been there what they have seen or experienced. Perhaps worst of all, both war and Faërie can change out of all recognition the wanderer's perception of the world to which he returns, so that never again can it be what it once was.

== Specific correspondences ==
=== Identified by Tolkien ===
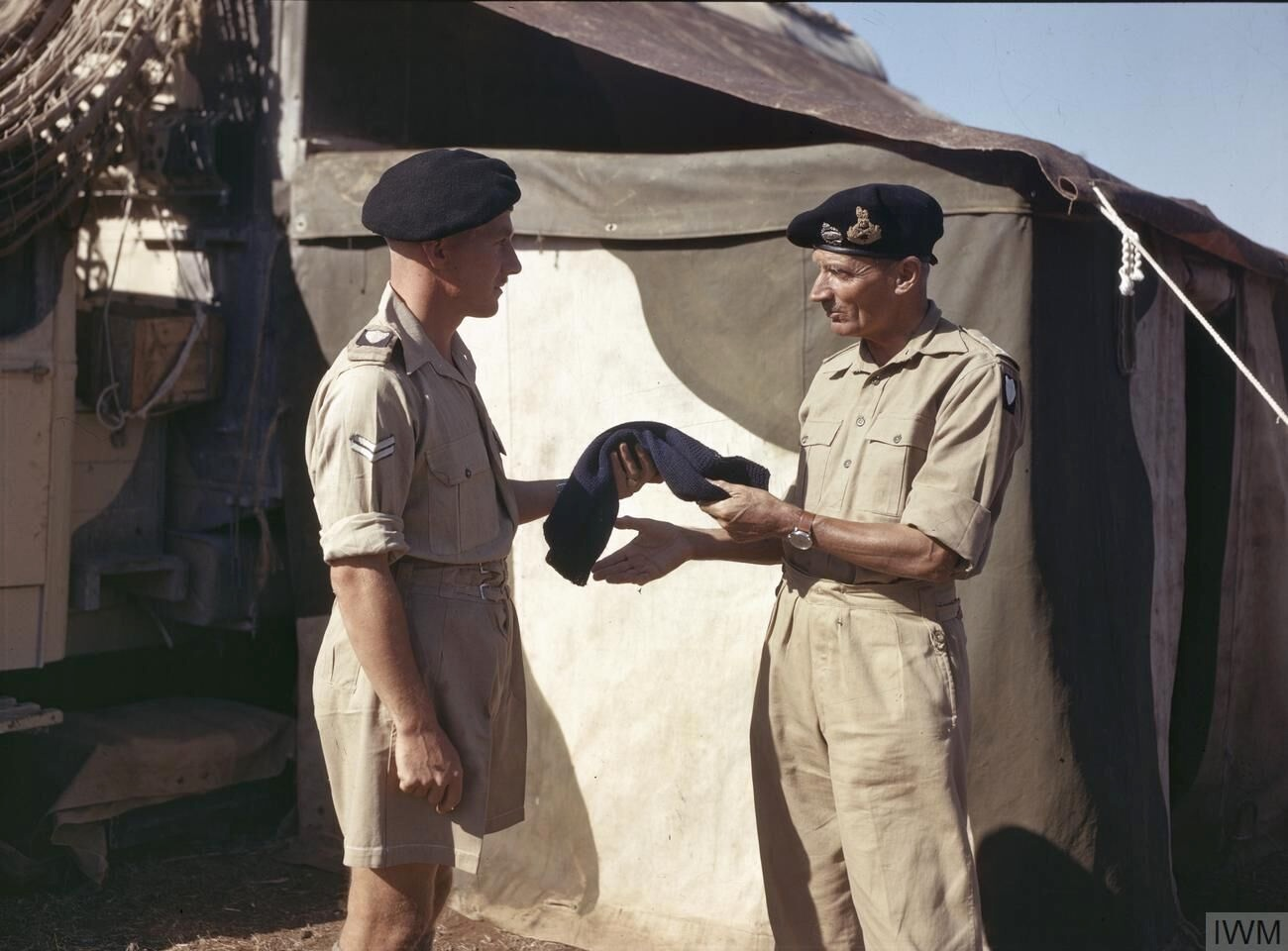
Tolkien stated that Sam Gamgee was based on the batmen he knew in the war. Photograph of a British officer, General Montgomery, being given a scarf by his batman.

Tolkien deliberately avoided saying much about the effect of the war on Middle-earth, and specifically denied that The Lord of the Rings was an allegory of the Second World War as some critics had supposed. Among the few connections he admitted are firstly that if any of his characters resembles him, it is Faramir, the scholarly military commander, "with a reverence for the old histories and sacred values that helps him through a bitter war". Secondly, Frodo's gardener Sam, who acts as his servant on the journey to destroy the Ruling Ring in Mordor, is in Tolkien's words "indeed a reflexion of the English soldier, of the privates and batmen I knew in the 1914 war, and recognised as so far superior to myself". Thirdly, Tolkien writes that neither world war "had any influence upon either the plot [of The Lord of the Rings] or the manner of its unfolding. The Dead Marshes and the approaches to the Morannon owe something to Northern France after the Battle of the Somme".

=== Identified by C. S. Lewis ===
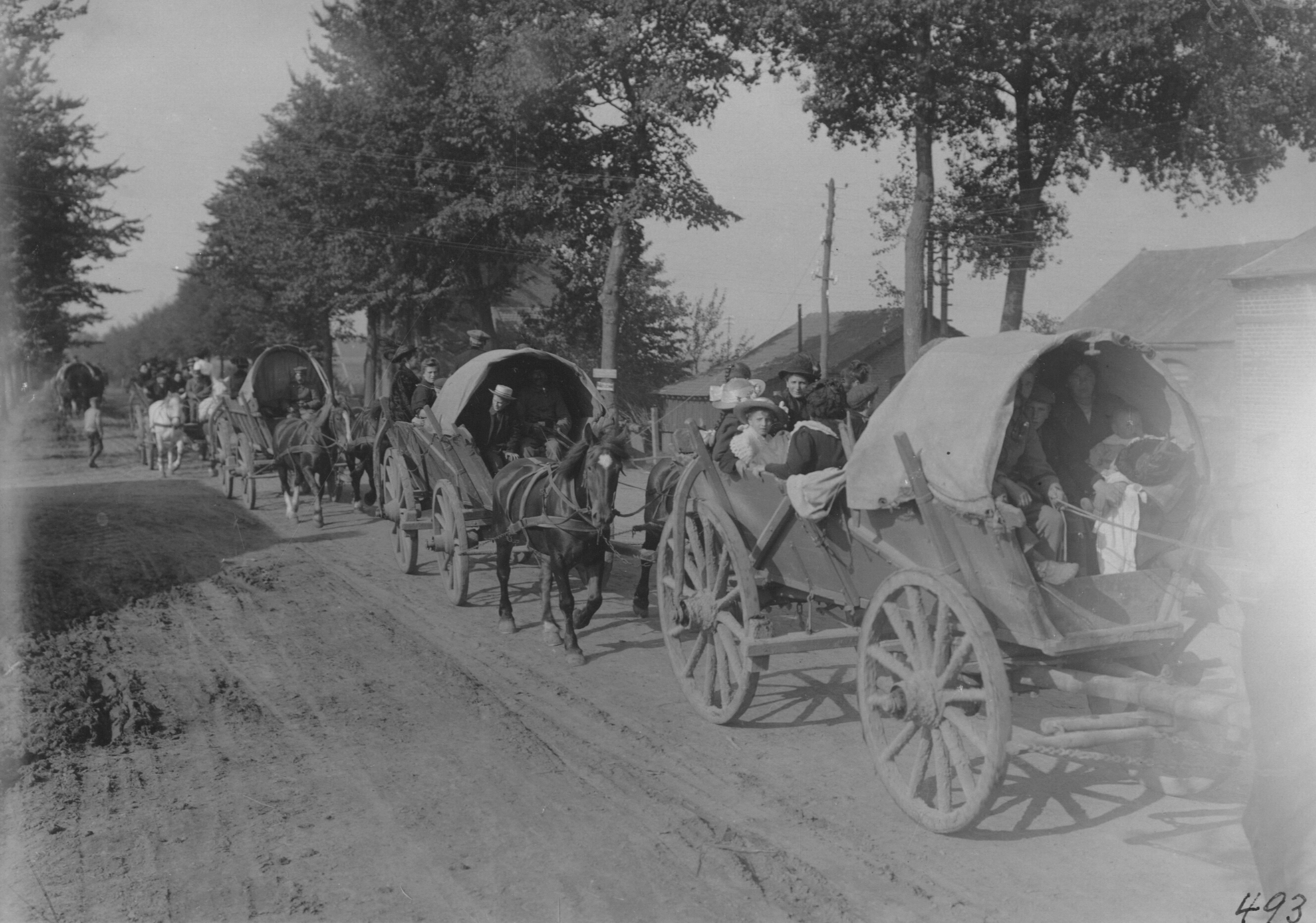
Tolkien's friend and fellow-Inkling C. S. Lewis, who had fought on the Western Front, noted the realism of The Lord of the Rings with details like "flying civilians". Photograph of fleeing French civilians near Bapaume

Lewis, who had also fought in the trenches (at the 1917 Battle of Arras), wrote in 1955 how surprisingly realistic he found The Lord of the Rings:

This war has the very quality of the war my generation knew. It is all here: the endless, unintelligible movement, the sinister quiet of the front when 'everything is now ready', (Note: Here Lewis alludes to the waiting in Minas Tirith for the onset of the forces of Mordor before the Battle of the Pelennor Fields.) the flying civilians, the lively, vivid friendships, the background of something like despair and the merry foreground, and such heavensent windfalls as a cache of tobacco 'salvaged' from a ruin. (Note: This is an allusion to the Hobbits Merry and Pippin, who are found to be smoking and making themselves comfortable in the ruins of Isengard.) The author has told us elsewhere that his taste for fairy-tale was wakened into maturity by active service; that, no doubt, is why we can say of his war scenes (quoting Gimli the Dwarf) 'There is good rock here. This country has tough bones.'

Garth comments that other resemblances could be added to Lewis's list, including Frodo's impatience with his parochial Shire Hobbits; the sudden descent into danger and mass mobilisation; the fierce courage of ordinary people, motivated by camaraderie and love; the "striking absence" of women in the story; the machine-dominated mind of Saruman. He cites Shippey's comment, too, that the Shire's lack of appreciation of Frodo when he returns after his quest echoes the disillusionment of British soldiers returning unwelcomed to England.

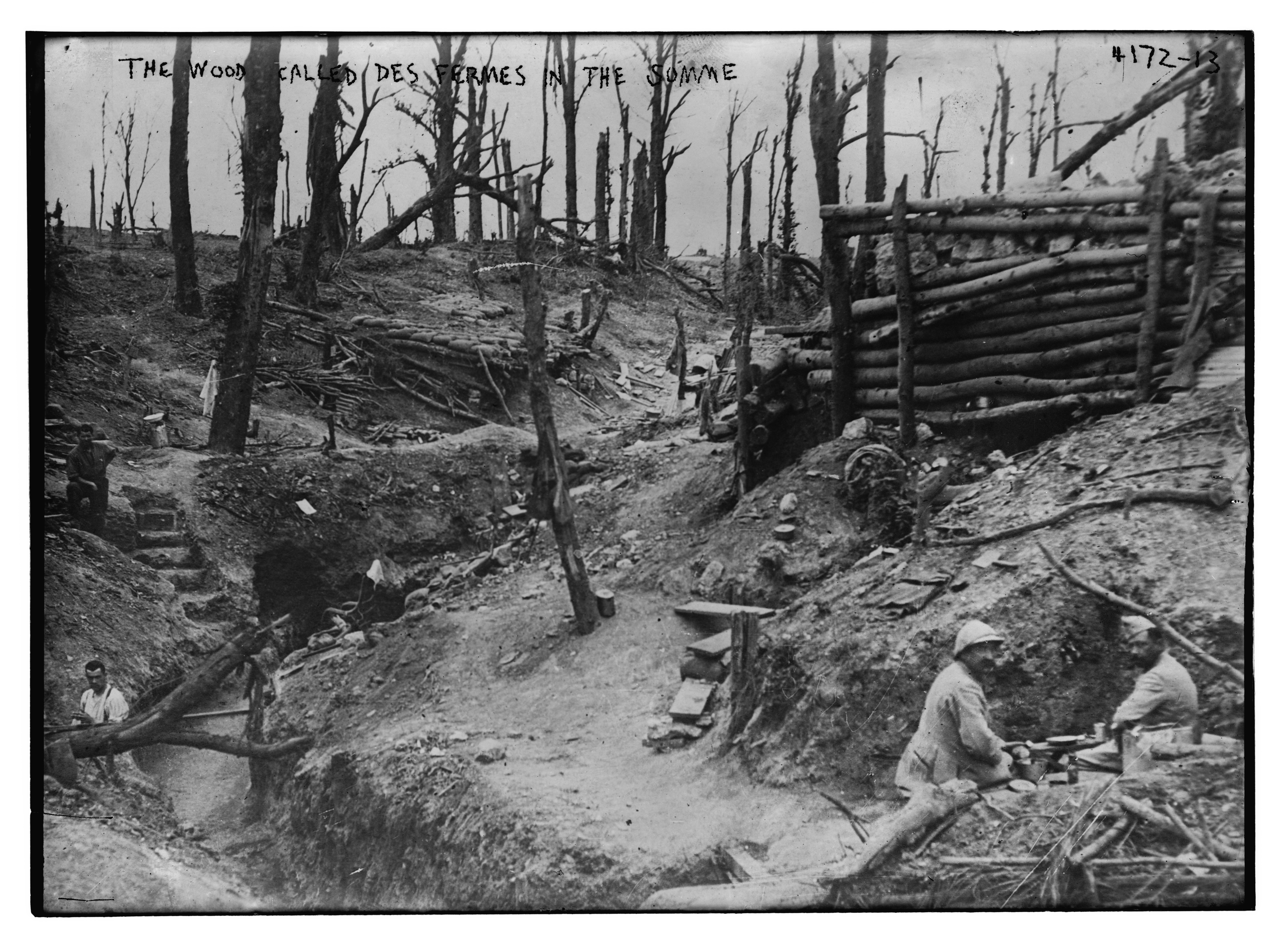
Garth suggests that the revenge of Fangorn's trees for Saruman's "wanton destruction" could have been prompted by the sight of shattered forests on the Somme battlefield.

Further, Garth writes, Lewis did not mention elements of The Lord of the Rings that might appear unrealistic, but which nevertheless echo the First World War: the Eye of Sauron's "sweeping surveillance"; the shifting of reality to dream on "long marches, or into nightmare in the midst of battle"; the "lumbering elephantine behemoths" and "previously unseen airborne killers" on the battlefield of the Pelennor Fields; the "Black Breath" of the Nazgûl that fills even the bravest with despair; and "the revenge of the trees for their wanton destruction" by Saruman.

=== Identified by Tolkien scholars ===
Following Garth's book, Tolkien scholars have studied numerous aspects of the influence of the Great War on Tolkien's writings, as on his friend and fellow-Inkling C. S. Lewis's. Suggested connections to that war include the birth of his legendarium during the war; fictional wars of Middle-earth in The Silmarillion, The Lord of the Rings, and indeed The Hobbit; the way that Tolkien transmuted his wartime experiences into art; and the issues of race, class, gender, and sexuality in wartime.

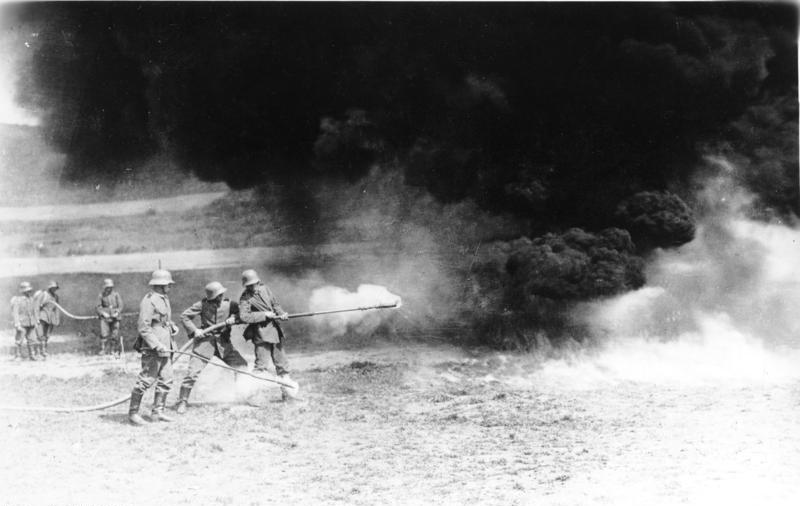
German Flammenwerfer on the Western Front, 1917

Shippey notes the likeness of the phrase used by Bard of Laketown in The Hobbit, urging the townsmen "to fight to the last arrow", to the wartime "fighting to the last round" (his emphasis). He finds a second parallel in the town's fight against the dragon Smaug with "a company of archers that held their ground ...", stating that "holding one's ground" speaks of "modern coolness and preparation" rather than "ancient 'berserk' fury". Another, he suggests, is the use by Saruman at Isengard of a projected burning substance, which he likens with "reference to Tolkien's own experience" to a Flammenwerfer, a German flame thrower. He finds a psychological correspondence, too, between the way that the Hobbits Pippin, Merry, and above all Sam maintain a cheerfulness even when they see no hope of success, with soldiers' accounts of the Great War such as Frank Richards's 1933 Old Soldiers Never Die; he states that this forms part of Tolkien's theory of courage. The opposite, defeatism, is to Tolkien a great evil; Shippey remarks that "with his best friends dead in Flanders", Tolkien hated it "like poison", and that even the bad steward of Gondor, Denethor, chooses ceremonial suicide over some Vichy-style submission to the enemy.

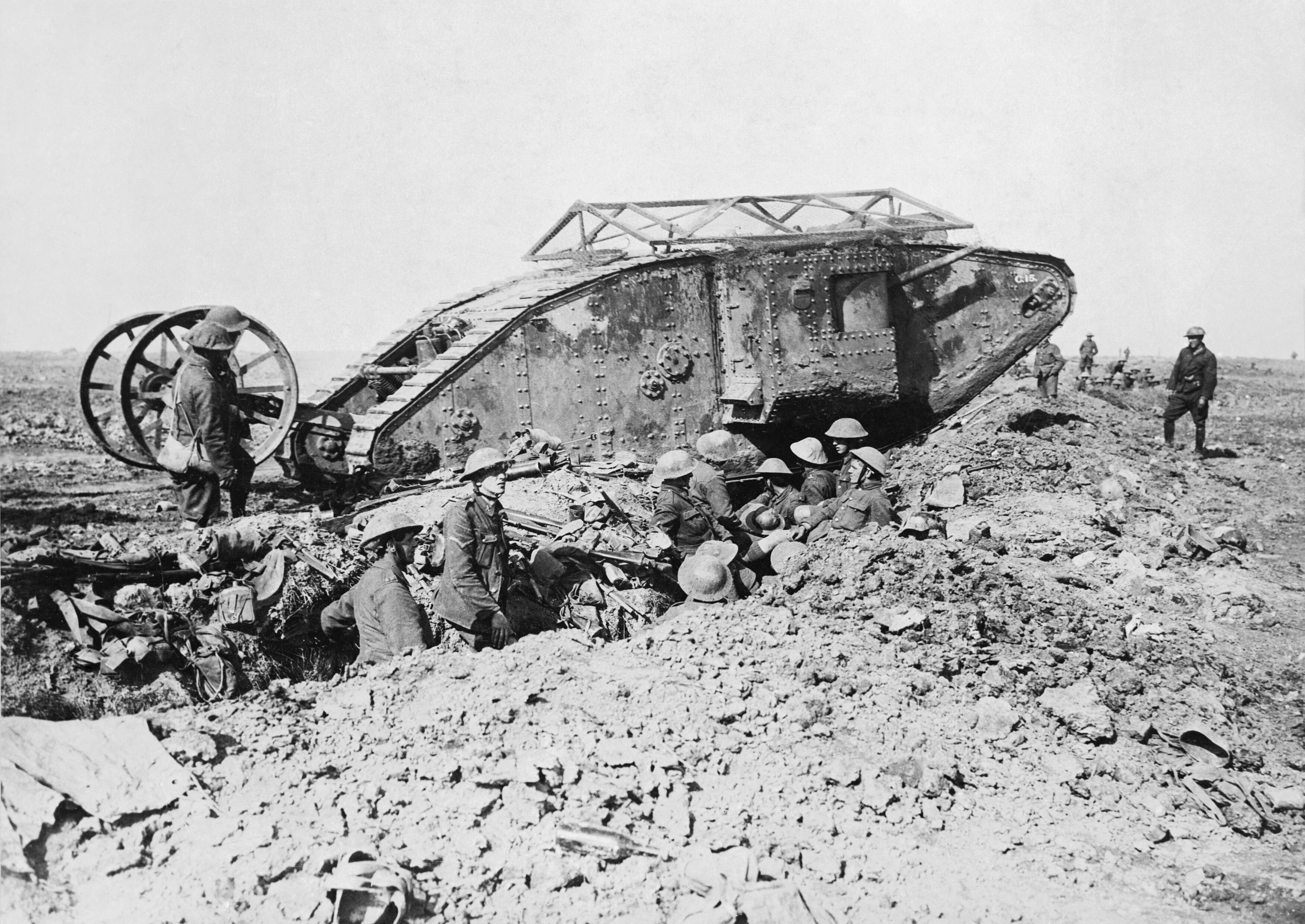
"Beasts like snakes and dragons of irresistible might": a British Mark I tank near Thiepval where Tolkien fought on the Somme in September 1916

The Tolkien scholar Janet Brennan Croft writes that the first prose work that Tolkien wrote after returning from the war was The Fall of Gondolin, and that it is "full of extended and terrifying scenes of battle"; she notes that the streetfighting is described over 16 pages. Croft compares Gondolin on its "island of rock in a hidden valley" with island Britain before the Great War, with its policy of "splendid isolation". Further, Britain had formed the Triple Entente, but delayed actually helping its neighbour, just as Gondolin, she writes, had stood apart from troubles outside. And, while Tolkien was writing in early 1918, the United States was still not involved in the war. Gondolin was forced to fight through treachery, while the Zimmermann Telegram, proposing a secret military alliance between Germany and Mexico, brought the United States into the war. Both Croft and Garth noted a resemblance between the monsters created by Melko for use against Gondolin, and the British Mark I tanks which joined the Battle of the Somme that Tolkien saw. Whether the monsters were living, mechanical, or both, they included a hollow metal kind which carried Orcs to battle.

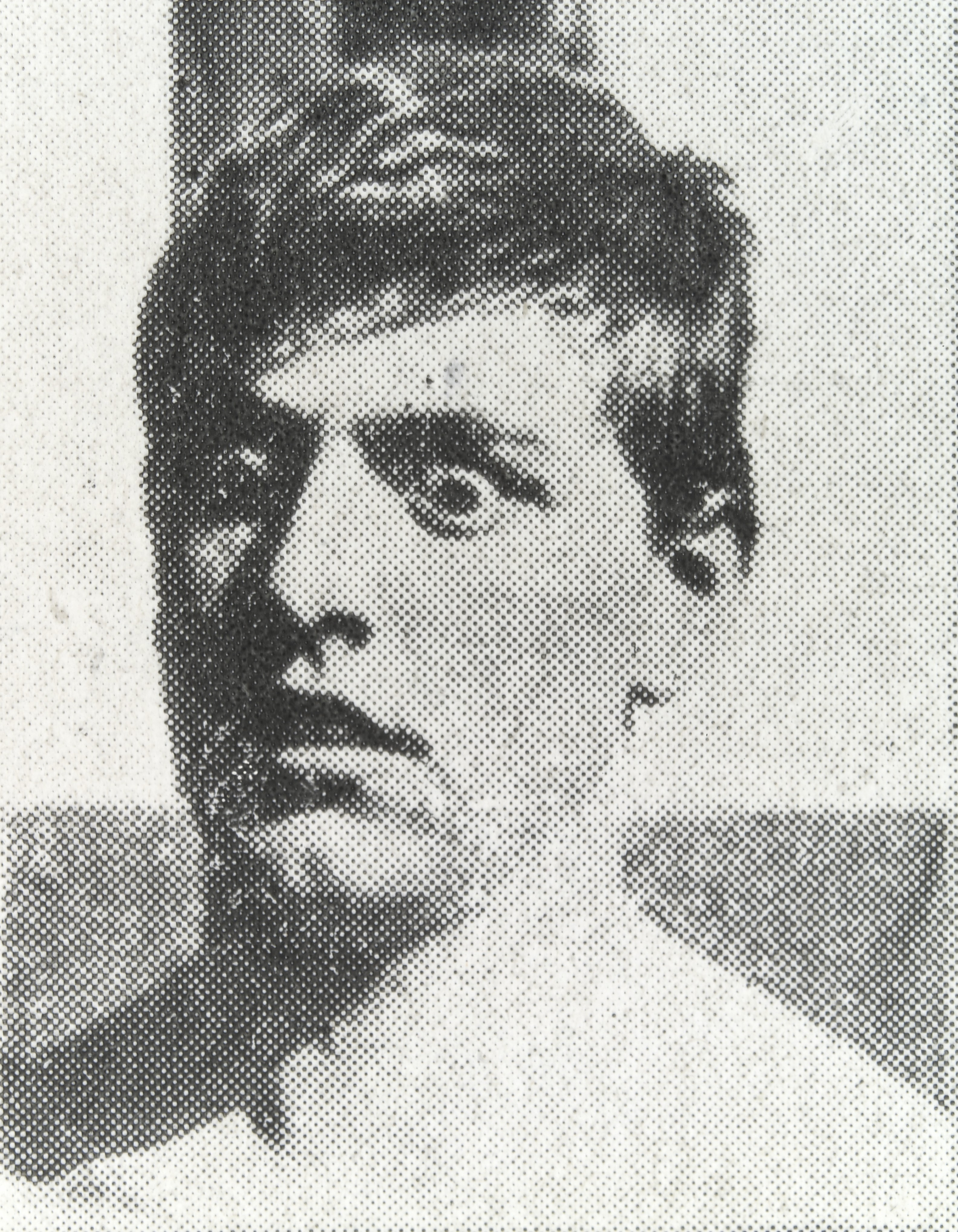
Frodo's sad return to the Shire at the end of The Lord of the Rings has been likened to the return of shell-shocked soldiers to England.

Both the scholar of English literature Chris Hopkins and the historian Michael Livingston, writing in Mythlore, note that the "battle-scarred landscapes" of Middle-earth resemble those of Flanders in the Great War. Frodo comes home to the Shire with what Livingston suggests is post-traumatic stress disorder (known to Great War soldiers as shell shock). He interprets Frodo's shock, sadness, and increasing pacifism as evidence of this disorder. In his view, it was not surprising that trench warfare left its mark on Tolkien's writing. He finds that Tolkien depicts this effect of war in a nuanced and sympathetic way in The Lord of the Rings. Hopkins observes, too, that while Tolkien portrays the Ringwraiths as wholly evil, their footsoldiers the Orcs are clearly brutal but their speech is often a source of comedy, with grumbling conversations and "jokey idioms" that recall urban working-class soldiers' dialect from the Great War.

Garth writes that when Tolkien created the tale of the wiping out of the "very numerous" Hammer of Wrath battalion of Elves in The Fall of Gondolin, where they were "ill-fated, and none ever fared away from that field", he can scarcely not have been thinking of the Battle of the Somme, where the units of both his close friends' battalions – Rob Gilson's Cambridgeshire Regiment, and his own and G. B. Smith's Lancashire Fusiliers suffered terrible losses. Similarly, he notes, Fëanor paid heavily for venturing too far into enemy territory. In a different way, the arrival of Tolkien's frame story wanderer Eriol, the "one who dreams alone", in the Lonely Isle, "the Land of Release", has in Garth's view the feeling of a soldier's dream of coming home to find everything restored to normality. Eriol is escaping his own time and entering the timeless realm of Faerie, just as for the soldier in the trenches, time had rushed on while it had hardly moved back in England, so, he suggests, the Lonely Isle could symbolise a nostalgic vision of England.

=== In film ===
The 2019 biopic Tolkien links the Great War to Middle-earth by showing Tolkien, in delirium, hallucinating a fire-breathing dragon from what may be a Flammenwerfer in no-man's land.

The Finnish film director Dome Karukoski's 2019 biographical drama film Tolkien narrates Tolkien's early life and wartime experiences. It depicts him in delirium with trench fever on the front line, beginning "to hallucinate scenes from the books he is yet to write", and thus visually linking the war to his legendarium. In a vision, perhaps dreamed, in a smoky, dark and chaotic no man's land of mud and shattered tree-stumps, he sees not a Flammenwerfer but a fiery dragon before him. He also has a batman named Sam. Sheila O'Malley, reviewing the film for the film criticism website RogerEbert.com, comments that having Tolkien literally "see[ing] dragons and what would eventually become the Eye of Sauron and the Nazgûl, unfurling across the hellscape of No-man's-Land ... is a very reductive approach to literature". Worse, in O'Malley's view, is that by explicitly showing the Somme as "'inspiration'" (her quotation marks) for Middle-earth, the film "diminish[es] both the battle and the books".

== Sources ==
- Bradshaw, Peter (2 May 2019). "Tolkien Review – Affecting Biopic of the Lord of the Rings Creator". The Observer.
- Brogan, Hugh (1989). "Tolkien's Great War". In Gillian Avery; Julia Briggs (eds.). Children and Their Books: A Celebration of the Works of Iona and Peter Opie. Clarendon Press. ISBN 978-0-19812-253-1. OCLC 1228195421.
- Carpenter, Humphrey (1978) [1977]. J. R. R. Tolkien: A Biography. Unwin Paperbacks. ISBN 978-0-04928-039-7.
- Catto, Mike (2019). "Tolkien". BBC: The Arts Show.
- Croft, Janet Brennan (2004). War and the Works of J.R.R. Tolkien. Praeger. ISBN 978-0-313-32592-2. OCLC 52948909.
- Croft, Janet Brennan; Röttinger, Annika, eds. (2019). Something Has Gone Crack: New Perspectives on J.R.R. Tolkien in the Great War. Walking Tree Publishers. ISBN 978-3-905703-41-2. OCLC 1121292764.
- Flieger, Verlyn (2001) [1997]. A Question of Time: J.R.R. Tolkien's Road to Faërie. Kent State University Press. ISBN 978-0-87338-699-9.
- Garth, John (2003). Tolkien and the Great War: The Threshold of Middle-earth. HarperCollins. ISBN 978-0-00711-953-0.
- Hamby, James (2021). "Book Review: "Something Has Gone Crack": New Perspectives on J.R.R. Tolkien in the Great War" (PDF). Fafnir - Nordic Journal of Science Fiction and Fantasy Research. 8 (1): 37–40. ISSN 2342-2009.
- Hopkins, Chris (1996). "Tolkien and Englishness". Mythlore. 21 (2). Article 41.
- Ide, Wendy (5 May 2019). "Tolkien Review – Lumpen Life Story". The Observer.
- Kosalka, David (2011). Ghosts of Mythic Pasts: Mythic History in the Works of Friedrich Gundolf, Robert Graves, and JRR Tolkien in Light of the First World War. University of Wisconsin–Milwaukee (PhD thesis).
- Lewis, C. S. (22 October 1955). "The Dethronement of Power". Time and Tide. p. 36.
- Livingston, Michael (2006). "The Shell-shocked Hobbit: The First World War and Tolkien's Trauma of the Ring". Mythlore. 25 (1). Article 6.
- Loconte, Joe (2015). A Hobbit, a Wardrobe, and a Great War: How J.R.R. Tolkien and C.S. Lewis Rediscovered Faith, Friendship, and Heroism in the Cataclysm of 1914-1918. Nelson Books. ISBN 978-0-7180-9145-3. OCLC 910568768.
- O'Malley, Sheila (10 May 2019). "Reviews: Tolkien". RogerEbert.com.
- Noad, Charles E. (2000). "On the Construction of The Silmarillion in Tolkien's Legendarium". In Verlyn Flieger; Carl F. Hostetter (eds.). Tolkien's Legendarium: Essays on The History of Middle-earth. Greenwood Press. pp. 31–68. ISBN 978-0-313-30530-6.
- Shippey, Tom (2005) [1982]. The Road to Middle-Earth (Third ed.). HarperCollins. ISBN 978-0-26110-275-0.
- Smith, Geoffrey Bache (1918). Tolkien, J. R. R. (ed.). A Spring Harvest. Erskine MacDonald. OCLC 78917370.
