= Evil in Middle-earth =

Theme in Tolkien's fiction

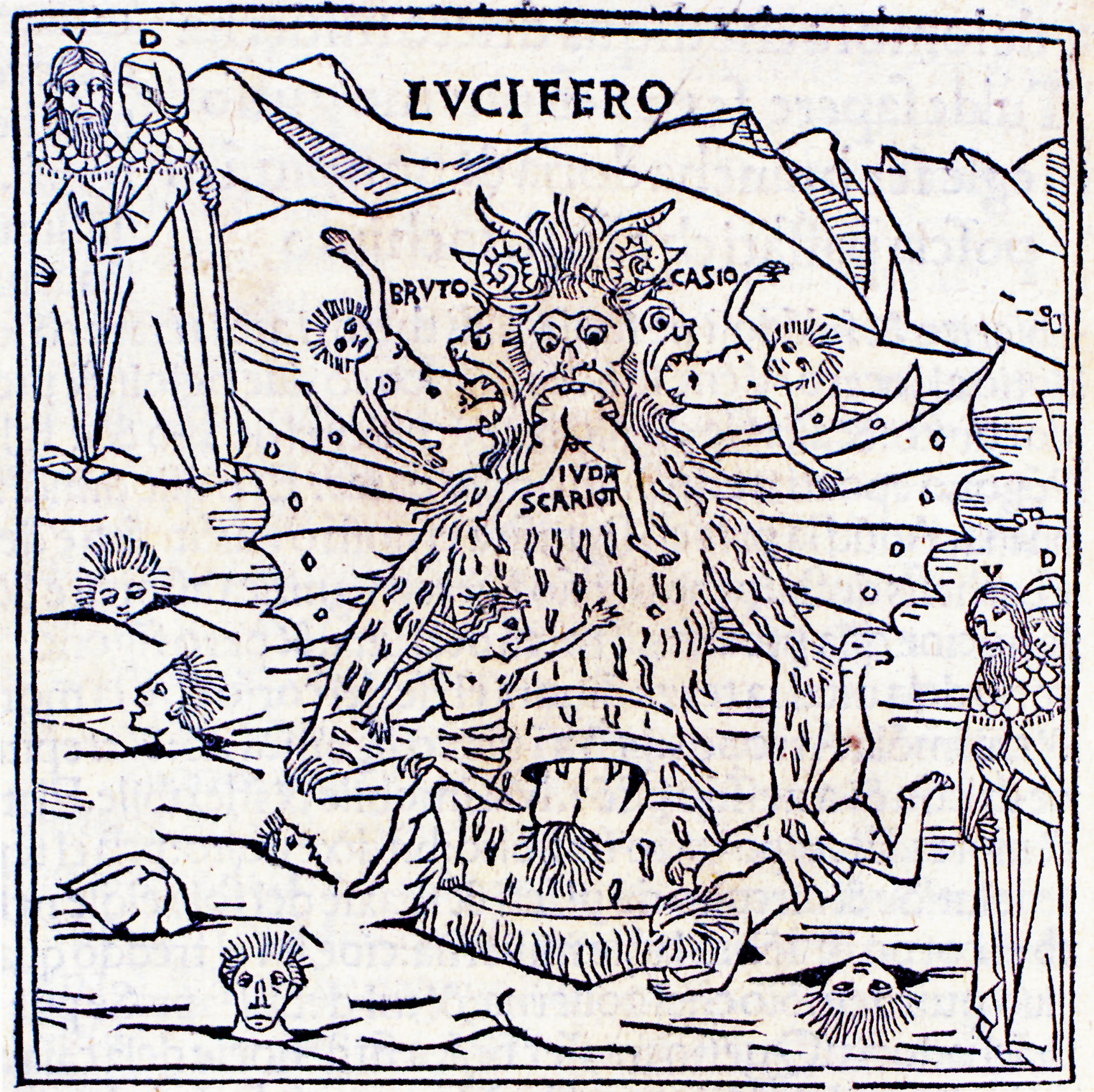
J. R. R. Tolkien's Dark Lord Melkor has been compared to Lucifer, as he is a powerful spirit-being who rebels against his creator. Illustration of Lucifer devouring human souls for Dante Alighieri's Inferno, canto 33. Pietro di Piasi, Venice, 1491.

Evil is ever-present in J. R. R. Tolkien's fictional realm of Middle-earth. Tolkien is ambiguous on the philosophical question of whether evil is the absence of good, the Boethian position, or whether it is a force seemingly as powerful as good, and forever opposed to it, the Manichaean view. The major evil characters have varied origins. The first is Melkor, the most powerful of the immortal and angelic Valar; he chooses discord over harmony, and becomes the first Dark Lord Morgoth. His lieutenant, Sauron, is an immortal Maia; he becomes Middle-earth's Dark Lord after Morgoth is banished from the world. Melkor has been compared to Satan in the Book of Genesis, and to John Milton's fallen angel in Paradise Lost. Others, such as Gollum, Denethor, and Saruman – respectively, a Hobbit, a Man, and a Wizard – are corrupted or deceived into evil, and die fiery deaths like those of evil beings in Norse sagas.

== Context: Tolkien's Catholicism ==
J. R. R. Tolkien was a devout Roman Catholic. He described The Lord of the Rings as rich in Christian symbolism. (Note: Carpenter 2023, Letters #142 to Robert Murray, S.J., 2 December 1953) Many theological themes underlie the narrative, including the battle of good versus evil, the triumph of humility over pride, and the activity of grace. (Note: Carpenter 2023, Letters #181 to Michael Straight, drafts, early 1956) The Bible and traditional Christian narrative influenced The Silmarillion; in particular, the fall of man is depicted in the Ainulindalë, the fighting amongst the Elves, and the fall of Númenor. (Note: Carpenter 2023, Letters #131 to Milton Waldman, late 1951)

== The nature of evil ==
=== Manichaean, or Augustinian and Boethian ===
Alternative views of evil in the world, Manichaean, where evil coexists with good, and Boethian, where evil is the absence of good. Both views are hinted at in Tolkien's Middle-earth writings. In addition, the creation of the world as good is Augustinian.

Tom Shippey writes that The Lord of the Rings embodies the ancient debate within Christianity on the nature of evil. Shippey notes Elrond's statement that "nothing is evil in the beginning. Even [the Dark Lord] Sauron was not so". (Note: Tolkien 1954a, book 2, ch. 2 "The Council of Elrond") He takes this to mean things were created good, and to have become evil by moving away from the good, a Boethian position (evil being the absence of good). This is set alongside the Manichaean view that good and evil are equally powerful, and battle it out in the world. Tolkien's personal war experience was Manichean: evil seemed at least as powerful as good, and could easily have been victorious, a strand which Shippey notes can also be seen in Middle-earth. Elrond's statement is taken by scholars to imply an Augustinian universe, created good.

=== Personified ===
The Jesuit John L. Treloar writes that the Book of Revelation personifies evil in the Four Horsemen of the Apocalypse: the first, on a white horse, represents a conquering king; the second, red with a sword, means bloody war; the third, black and carrying a scale balance, means famine; and the last, green, is named death. Treloar comments that the personification increases the emotional impact, and that the Ringwraiths (Nazgûl) are introduced "as terror-inspiring horsemen who bring these four evils into the world. They are bent on conquest, war, [and] death, and the land they rule [in Mordor] is non-productive."

=== Involving sapience ===
Tolkien, a devout Roman Catholic, created what he came to feel was a moral dilemma for himself with his supposedly wholly evil Middle-earth peoples like Orcs, when he made them able to speak. This identified them as sentient and sapient; indeed, he portrayed them talking about right and wrong. This meant, he believed, that they were open to morality, like Men. In Tolkien's Christian framework, that in turn implied that they must have souls, so killing them would be wrong without very good reason. Orcs serve as the principal forces of the enemy in The Lord of the Rings, where they are slaughtered in large numbers, such as in the battles of Helm's Deep and the Pelennor Fields.

If Tolkien wanted killing Orcs not to be such a problem, then they would have to be without any moral sense, like ordinary animals. That would place them as fierce enemies, but not sapient. Both Tolkien and other scholars have been aware of the contradiction implied by this position: if Orcs were essentially "beasts", then they should not have had a moral sense; if they were corrupted Elves, then treating them as "other" to be slaughtered was straightforward racism. Tolkien made repeated attempts to resolve the dilemma, (Note: Tolkien 1984b, "The Tale of Tinúviel") (Note: Tolkien 1977, ch. 3 "Of the Coming of the Elves"; ch. 10 "Of the Sindar") (Note: Tolkien 1984b "The Fall of Gondolin") without arriving at what he felt was a satisfactory solution.

== Dark Lords ==
=== Morgoth ===
In Tom Shippey's analysis, The Silmarillion's Melkor/Morgoth parallels the Book of Genesis's Lucifer/Satan.

Middle-earth's first Dark Lord is Morgoth in The Silmarillion. Morgoth originates as Melkor, the most powerful of the divine or angelic Valar. He chooses to go his own way rather than to follow that of the creator, and creates discord. (Note: Tolkien 1977, "Ainulindalë") He is renamed Morgoth, the dark enemy. (Note: Tolkien 1993, pp. 194, 294) Morgoth's lieutenant is a lesser spirit being, a Maia, Sauron, one of several seduced into his service. (Note: Tolkien 1977, "Valaquenta") Morgoth wages war on the Elves of Beleriand. (Note: Tolkien 1977, ch. 13, "Of the Return of the Noldor") (Note: Tolkien 1977, ch. 18, "Of the Ruin of Beleriand") (Note: Tolkien 1977, ch. 20, "Of the Fifth Battle: Nirnaeth Arnoediad") Eventually the Valar call on the creator, Eru Ilúvatar, to intervene; Morgoth is destroyed amidst the utter ruin of his fortress of Thangorodrim; Beleriand sinks beneath the waves, ending the First Age of Middle-earth. (Note: Tolkien 1977, ch. 24, "Of the Voyage of Eärendil and the War of Wrath")

Melkor has been interpreted as analogous to Satan, once the greatest of all God's angels, Lucifer, but fallen through pride; he rebels against his creator. Morgoth has been likened, too, to John Milton's fallen angel in Paradise Lost, again a Satan-figure. Tom Shippey has written that The Silmarillion maps the Book of Genesis with its creation and its fall, even Melkor having begun with good intentions. Marjorie Burns has commented that Tolkien used the Norse god Odin to create aspects of several characters, the wizard Gandalf getting some of his good characteristics, while Morgoth gets his destructiveness, malevolence, and deceit. Verlyn Flieger writes that the central temptation is the desire to possess, something that ironically afflicts two of the greatest figures in the legendarium, Melkor and Fëanor.

=== Sauron ===
Transmission of Evil in Middle-earth, starting with the Dark Lord Morgoth and his lieutenant Sauron

==== Men deceived: Númenor destroyed ====
In the Second Age, Sauron proceeds to deceive the Men of Númenor into seeking immortality by invading Valinor. When their fleet arrives there, Eru Ilúvatar once again intervenes. The flat world is remade to be round, the fleet is destroyed, and Númenor is drowned, ending the Second Age in a cataclysm reminiscent of the legend of Atlantis. (Note: Tolkien 1977, "Of the Rings of Power and the Third Age") (Note: Carpenter 2023, #211 to Rhona Beare, 14 October 1958) The faithful under Elendil, who opposed the attack on Valinor, escape to Middle-earth. (Note: Tolkien 1955, Appendices)

==== Elves deceived: the Rings of Power and the Nazgûl ====
Sauron too escapes, and takes on the mantle of Dark Lord for the Third Age. He helps the Elves of Middle-earth to put their power into Rings of Power, which they intend to use for good. He deceives them by secretly forging the One Ring, putting much of his own power into it, and gaining power over all the other Rings. The Elves perceive him and hide their three Rings, preventing him from controlling them. He gives seven Rings to the Dwarf-lords, and nine Rings to lords of Men. The nine become Ringwraiths, the Nazgûl, corrupted and enslaved to his will. Sauron uses the One Ring to build the Dark Tower of Mordor, Barad-dûr, and to amass armies of Orcs, Men, Trolls, and other beings. Elves led by Gil-galad, and Men led by Elendil, make war on Mordor. The two of them defeat Sauron, at the cost of their own lives; Elendil's son Isildur cuts the One Ring from Sauron's hand, but fails to destroy it.

==== The War of the Ring ====
Centuries later, Sauron rematerialises, and rebuilds Mordor and its armies. He learns that the One Ring has not been destroyed, and sends the Nazgûl to find it: if he regains it, his power of evil will dominate the whole of Middle-earth. (Note: Tolkien 1954a, book 1, ch. 2 "The Shadow of the Past") In the War of the Ring, it is finally destroyed, through the combined courage of the Free Peoples of Middle-earth, the confusion caused by the traitor Saruman, Sauron's own inability to see the quest to destroy the Ring, and the evil of Gollum that unexpectedly has a good result, or as King Théoden proverbially says, "oft evil will shall evil mar". (Note: Tolkien 1954, Book 3, ch. 9 "The Palantír") The Third Age ends, leaving Middle-earth to become a world of Men.

=== Monsters in spirit ===
Joe Abbott describes the Dark Lords Morgoth and Sauron as monsters, intelligent and powerful but wholly gone over to evil. He notes that in The Monsters and the Critics, Tolkien distinguished between ordinary monsters in the body, and monsters also in spirit: "The distinction [is] between a devilish ogre, and a devil revealing himself in ogre-form—between a monster, devouring the body and bringing temporal death, that is inhabited by a cursed spirit, and a spirit of evil aiming ultimately at the soul and bringing eternal death". By going beyond the limits of the body with these monstrous Dark Lords, Tolkien had in Abbott's view made the "ultimate transformation" for a Christian author, creating "a far more terrifying monster" than any physical adversary.

=== Presiding over successive falls ===
The evil power of the Dark Lords brings about successive falls in the history of Middle-earth, reflecting the biblical pattern in which man is cast out of the original paradise into the ordinary world, never to return. Morgoth presides over the destruction of the two Lamps, then that of the Two Trees of Valinor, then the ruinous wars over the Silmarils. Tolkien noted that reflections of the biblical fall of man can be seen in the Ainulindalë, the Kinslaying at Alqualondë, and (under Sauron) the fall of Númenor. Sauron is at last destroyed in the War of the Ring, but even that victory represents the dwindling or fading away of all non-human peoples in Middle-earth, including the Elves and Dwarves.

== Evil characters ==
=== Witch-king of Angmar ===
A Boethian depiction of Evil

In rode the Lord of the Nazgûl. A great black shape against the fires beyond he loomed up, grown to a vast menace of despair. In rode the Lord of the Nazgûl, under the archway that no enemy ever yet had passed, and all fled before his face.
All save one. There waiting, silent, and still in the space before the Gate, sat Gandalf upon Shadowfax: Shadowfax who alone among the free horses of the earth endured the terror, unmoving, steadfast as a graven image in Rath Dínen.
"You cannot enter here", said Gandalf, and the huge shadow halted. "Go back to the abyss prepared for you! Go back! Fall into the nothingness that awaits you and your Master. Go!"
The Black Rider flung back his hood, and behold! he had a kingly crown; and yet upon no head visible was it set. The red fires shone between it and the mantled shoulders vast and dark. From a mouth unseen there came a deadly laughter.
"Old fool!" he said. "Old fool! This is my hour. Do you not know Death when you see it? Die now and curse in vain!" And with that he lifted high his sword and flames ran down the blade...

— "The Siege of Gondor" (Note: Tolkien 1955, book 5, ch. 4, "The Siege of Gondor")

The Witch-king of Angmar is Lord of the Nazgûl, a former King of the northern Kingdom of Angmar which made war on the Númenórean Kingdom of Arnor, and destroyed it. Commentators have written that the Lord of the Nazgûl functions at the level of myth when he calls himself Death and bursts the gates of Minas Tirith with magical spells. At a theological level, he embodies a vision of evil similar to Karl Barth's description of evil as das Nichtige, an active and powerful force that turns out to be empty.

=== Gollum ===
Gollum is, Burns writes, "a thieving, kin-murdering, treasure-hoarding, sun-hating, underground dweller who ought to be dead," much like the Barrow-wight. As Gollum states: "We are lost, lost... No name, no business, no Precious, nothing. Only empty. Only hungry; yes, we are hungry". (Note: Tolkien 1954 Book 4, ch. 6 "The Forbidden Pool") Verlyn Flieger suggests that Gollum is Tolkien's central monster-figure, likening him to both Grendel and the Beowulf dragon, "the twisted, broken, outcast hobbit whose manlike shape and dragonlike greed combine both the Beowulf kinds of monster in one figure". Burns comments that Gollum has other attributes from the undead of Norse myth: supernatural strength, demanding that he be wrestled; he may appear to be black, but has "bone-white" skin.

=== Saruman ===
Saruman is the leader of the Istari, wizards sent to Middle-earth in human form by the Valar to challenge Sauron. He comes to desire Sauron's power for himself, so he betrays the Istari and tries to take over Middle-earth by force, creating an army in his fastness of Isengard. He embodies the themes of the corruptive nature of power and the use of technology in opposition to nature. His desire for knowledge and order leads to his fall, as he submits to Sauron's evil will, brought about by the use of a palantír and his study of "the arts of the enemy". He rejects the chance of redemption when it is offered.

=== Denethor ===
Denethor is the Steward of Gondor, a realm neighbouring and opposed to Mordor. He is depicted as embittered and despairing as the forces of Mordor close in on Gondor. He does not side with Sauron, but his use of a Palantír allows Sauron to deceive him about present and future events. Tom Shippey comments that this forms part of a pattern around the use of the deceptive Palantír, that one should not try to see the future but should trust in one's luck and make one's own mind up, courageously facing one's duty in each situation. Critics have noted the contrast between Denethor and both Théoden, the good King of Rohan, and Aragorn, the true King of Gondor. Others have likened Denethor to Shakespeare's King Lear, who similarly falls into a dangerous despair.

== Deaths of evil characters ==
Marjorie Burns writes that multiple monstrous or evil characters in Middle-earth die deaths that would befit "the [undead] afterwalkers of Old Norse sagas", being destroyed by fire sufficient to eliminate them completely. Gollum is brought to an end by fire, the final resort for "stopping the restless dead". In similar vein, the Nazgûl, already wraiths, are destroyed at the same time as the One Ring, blazing in their final flight, "shooting like flaming bolts" and ending in "fiery ruin" as they are burnt out. (Note: Tolkien 1955 Book 3, ch. 3 "Mount Doom") Burns states that Tolkien creates "quite a pattern" for characters "who would take more than their due and who have aligned themselves with death", naming Sauron, Saruman, and Denethor as instances of those who come to a "final and well-deserved destruction".

Marjorie Burns's analysis of the living deaths and final ends of evil characters in Middle-earth
Evil character	Origin	Actions	Fiery death
Gollum	Hobbit	Constantly seeks the One Ring, finally bites it from Frodo's hand	Falls into the fire of the Cracks of Doom in Orodruin
Nazgûl	Kings of Men	Obey Sauron's commands, carry messages to Orthanc, terrify his enemies	Seemingly on fire in their final flight, "shooting like flaming bolts", ending in "fiery ruin"
Sauron	A Maia, assistant to Morgoth	Creates the One Ring to dominate Middle-earth; uses it to build Mordor and the Dark Tower; becomes the "Necromancer", communing with the dead	"Virtually indestructible": undone by fire, his shadow blown away
Saruman	Wizard, a Maia	Imitator of Sauron; creates an army in Isengard, dwells in the tower of Orthanc; has sided with death	As a Maia, should be immortal; turns to "grey mist ... like smoke from a fire"; is blown away by the wind
Denethor	Dúnedain, Steward of Gondor	Lives in dying city of Minas Tirith; plans to die, killing his one remaining son Faramir with him	Burns to death on funeral pyre, holding his magical Palantír

== Sources ==
- Abbott, Joe (1989). "Tolkien's Monsters: Concept and Function in The Lord of the Rings (Part 3) Sauron". Mythlore. 16 (3). Article 8.
- Burns, Marjorie (2000). "Gandalf and Odin". In Flieger, Verlyn; Hostetter, Carl F. (eds.). Tolkien's Legendarium: Essays on the History of Middle-earth. Westport, Connecticut: Greenwood Press. pp. 219–246. ISBN 978-0-313-30530-6. OCLC 41315400.
- Burns, Marjorie (2014). "Night-wolves, Half-trolls and the Dead Who Won't Stay Down". In Houghton, John Wm.; Croft, Janet Brennan; Martsch, N. (eds.). Tolkien in the New Century: Essays in Honor of Tom Shippey. McFarland. pp. 182–196. ISBN 978-1-4766-1486-1.
- Carpenter, Humphrey, ed. (2023) [1981]. The Letters of J. R. R. Tolkien: Revised and Expanded Edition. New York: HarperCollins. ISBN 978-0-35-865298-4.
- Carter, Lin (2011). Tolkien: A Look Behind The Lord Of The Rings. London, England: Hachette UK. ISBN 978-0-575-11666-5.
- Chance, Jane (1980) [1979]. Tolkien's Art: 'A Mythology for England'. Papermac. ISBN 0-333-29034-8.
- Dickerson, Matthew T.; Evans, Jonathan Duane (2006). Ents, Elves, and Eriador: The Environmental Vision of J.R.R. Tolkien. University Press of Kentucky. pp. 192 et seq. ISBN 978-0-8131-2418-6.
- Evans, Jonathan Duane (2013) [2006]. "Saruman". J. R. R. Tolkien Encyclopedia. Routledge. pp. 589–590. ISBN 978-0-41586511-1.
- Flieger, Verlyn (1983). "Making versus Hoarding". Splintered Light: Logos and Language in Tolkien's World. Wm B. Eerdmans Publishing. ISBN 978-0-8028-1955-0.
- Flieger, Verlyn (2004). "Frodo and Aragorn: The Concept of the Hero". In Zimbardo, Rose A.; Isaacs, Neil D. (eds.). Understanding the Lord of the Rings: The Best of Tolkien Criticism. Houghton Mifflin. ISBN 978-0-618-42251-7.
- Hannon, Patrice (2004). "The Lord of the Rings as Elegy". Mythlore. 24 (2): 36–42.
- Holmes, John R. (2013) [2007]. "Milton". In Drout, Michael D. C. (ed.). The J. R. R. Tolkien Encyclopedia. Routledge. ISBN 978-1-135-88033-0.
- Kocher, Paul H. (1973). Master of Middle-earth. London: Thames and Hudson. ISBN 0-500-01095-1.
- Rosebury, Brian (2003). Tolkien: A Cultural Phenomenon. Palgrave. ISBN 978-1403-91263-3.
- Rosebury, Brian (2008). "Tolkien in the History of Ideas". In Bloom, Harold (ed.). J.R.R. Tolkien. Infobase Publishing. ISBN 978-1-60413-146-8.
- Shippey, Tom (2005) [1982]. The Road to Middle-Earth: How J. R. R. Tolkien Created a New Mythology (Third ed.). HarperCollins. ISBN 978-0-261-10275-0.
- Smith, Leigh (2007). "The Influence of King Lear on Lord of the Rings". In Croft, Janet Brennan (ed.). Tolkien and Shakespeare: Essays on Shared Themes and Language. McFarland & Company. p. 140. ISBN 978-0-78642-827-4.
- Spacks, Patricia Meyer (1968). "6 Power and meaning in The Lord of the Rings". In Isaacs, Neil (ed.). Tolkien and the Critics; Essays on J. R. R. Tolkien's the Lord of the Rings. University of Notre Dame. pp. 84–85. ISBN 0-268-00279-7.
- Tally, Robert T. Jr. (2010). "Let Us Now Praise Famous Orcs: Simple Humanity in Tolkien's Inhuman Creatures". Mythlore. 29 (1). article 3.
- Tolkien, J. R. R. (1954a). The Fellowship of the Ring. The Lord of the Rings. Boston: Houghton Mifflin. OCLC 9552942.
- Tolkien, J. R. R. (1954). The Two Towers. The Lord of the Rings. Boston: Houghton Mifflin. OCLC 1042159111.
- Tolkien, J. R. R. (1955). The Return of the King. The Lord of the Rings. Boston: Houghton Mifflin. OCLC 519647821.
- Tolkien, J. R. R. (1977). Christopher Tolkien (ed.). The Silmarillion. Boston: Houghton Mifflin. ISBN 978-0-395-25730-2.
- Tolkien, J. R. R. (1984b). Christopher Tolkien (ed.). The Book of Lost Tales. Vol. 2. Boston: Houghton Mifflin. ISBN 0-395-36614-3.
- Tolkien, J. R. R. (1993). Christopher Tolkien (ed.). Morgoth's Ring. Boston: Houghton Mifflin. ISBN 0-395-68092-1.
- Treloar, John L. (1988). "Tolkien and Christian Concepts of Evil: Apocalypse and Privation". Mythlore. 15 (2). Article 7.
- Walther, Bo Kampmann; Larsen, Lasse Juel (2024). "Beyond the Fantasy of Orcs: Orcish Transformation in Amazon's The Rings of Power". HumaNetten (52 (Spring 2024)): 92–109. doi:10.15626/hn.20245209.
