= Waybread =

Waybread may refer to:

- Plantago major, or broadleaf plantain, a species of flowering plant
- Lembas, or elvish waybread, a fictional food in the works of J. R. R. Tolkien
