= Tolkien's monsters =

Evil beings in J. R. R. Tolkien's Middle-earth fiction

Tolkien's monsters are the evil beings, such as Orcs, Trolls, and giant spiders, who oppose and sometimes fight the protagonists in J. R. R. Tolkien's Middle-earth legendarium. Tolkien was an expert on Old English, especially Beowulf, and several of his monsters share aspects of the Beowulf monsters; his Trolls have been likened to Grendel, the Orcs' name harks back to the poem's orcneas, and the dragon Smaug has multiple attributes of the Beowulf dragon. The European medieval tradition of monsters makes them either humanoid but distorted, or like wild beasts, but very large and malevolent; Tolkien follows both traditions, with monsters like Orcs of the first kind and Wargs of the second. Some scholars add Tolkien's immensely powerful Dark Lords Morgoth and Sauron to the list, as monstrous enemies in spirit as well as in body. Scholars have noted that the monsters' evil nature reflects Tolkien's Roman Catholicism, a religion which has a clear conception of good and evil.

== Origins ==
The word "monster" has as its origin the Latin monstrum, "a marvel, prodigy, portent", in turn from Latin monstrare, "to show". Monsters in medieval Europe were often humanoid, but could also resemble wild beasts, but of enormous size; J. R. R. Tolkien followed both paths in creating his own monsters.

Some of Tolkien's monsters may derive from his detailed knowledge of the Old English epic poem Beowulf; Gollum has some attributes of Grendel, while the dragon Smaug in The Hobbit shares several features with the Beowulf dragon. The poem, too, speaks of Orcs, with the Old English compound orcneas, meaning "demon-corpses". In his famous 1936 lecture, "Beowulf: The Monsters and the Critics", Tolkien described the poem's monsters as central to its structure, changing the course of Beowulf scholarship. Commentators have noted that Tolkien clearly preferred the epic's monsters to the critics.

== Humanoid, bestial, and beyond ==
=== Evil in mind or body ===
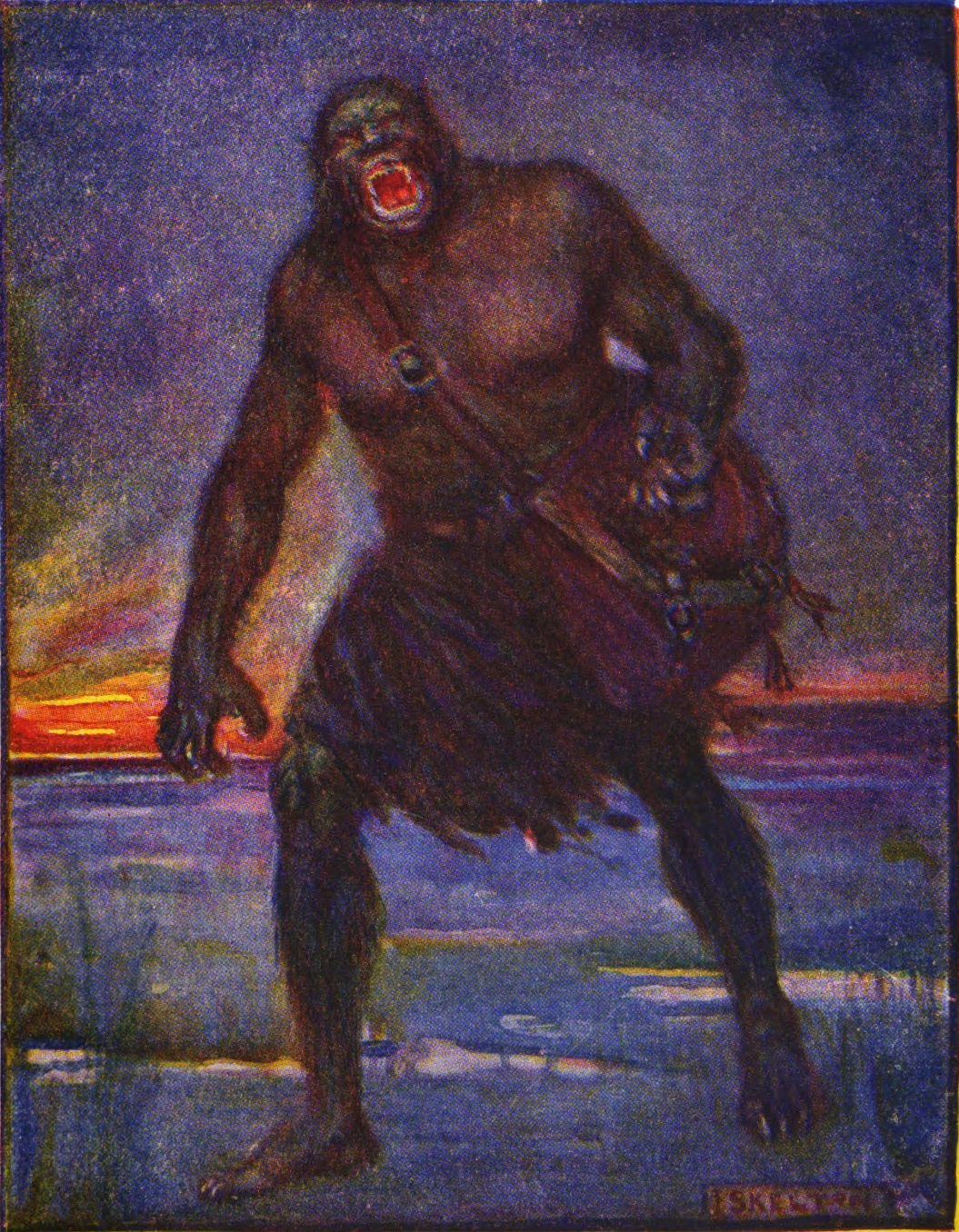
Tolkien's later, wordless trolls have been compared to Grendel, a monster in Beowulf. Illustration by J. R. Skelton, 1908

In the J. R. R. Tolkien Encyclopedia, Jonathan Evans initially identifies two categories of monster in Tolkien's legendarium. The first includes Trolls, Orcs, and Balrogs, which are humanoid, but distorted in various ways; the second consists of malevolent beasts which resemble those of the natural world, but are much larger, such as the wolflike Wargs, the giant evil spiders – Ungoliant and her brood including Shelob – and the tentacled Watcher in the Water. The featherless winged steeds of the Nazgûl are monstrous in the second way, gigantic but evidently based on nature, and "apt to evil". Tolkien never names them, though he describes them as "fell beasts", and describes them in a letter as "pterodactylic". (Note: Tolkien 1955, book 5, ch. 6, "The Battle of the Pelennor Fields") (Note: Carpenter 2023, #211 to Rhona Beare, 14 October 1958)

Evans notes that Tolkien's dragons, "an especially important monstrous type", do not fit either of these categories, and he treats those "extraordinarily large, reptilian creatures ... preternaturally evil monsters" separately. Dragons are mentioned only in passing in The Lord of the Rings, but dragons that can speak but which are certainly not humanoid are important characters in both The Silmarillion and The Hobbit.

Tolkien was not consistent in his allocation of monsters to these categories. In The Hobbit, the hill-trolls are initially comic; they are carnivorous but not particularly malevolent, have vulgar table manners, and speak, with Cockney accents. However, when the Wizard Gandalf outwits them, the scholar Christina Fawcett writes, these Trolls are seen as "monstrous, a warning against vice, captured forever in stone for their greed and anger". The critic Gregory Hartley adds that the Trolls in The Silmarillion and The Lord of the Rings are "more bestial" and much less like the trolls of Norse mythology; Fawcett compares them to the monster Grendel in Beowulf. Tolkien's description runs: "Olog-hai they were called in the Black Speech. That Sauron bred them none doubted, though from what stock was not known... Trolls they were, but filled with the evil will of their master: a fell race, strong, agile, fierce and cunning, but harder than stone. Unlike the older race of the Twilight they could endure the Sun, so long as the will of Sauron held sway over them. They spoke little, and the only tongue that they knew was the Black Speech of Barad-dûr." (Note: Tolkien 1955, Appendix F "Of Other Races")

=== Evil in spirit ===
Other scholars sometimes add the Legendarium's powerful opponents to the list of monsters; Joe Abbott, writing in Mythlore, describes the Dark Lords Morgoth and Sauron as monsters, intelligent and powerful but wholly gone over to evil. Abbott notes that in The Monsters and the Critics, Tolkien distinguished between ordinary monsters in the body, and monsters also in spirit:

The distinction [is] between a devilish ogre, and a devil revealing himself in ogre-form—between a monster, devouring the body and bringing temporal death, that is inhabited by a cursed spirit, and a spirit of evil aiming ultimately at the soul and bringing eternal death"

By going beyond the limits of the body with these monstrous Dark Lords, Tolkien had in Abbott's view made the "ultimate transformation" for a Christian author, creating "a far more terrifying monster".

== Themes ==
=== Evil and darkness ===
Tolkien's Roman Catholicism gave him a clear sense of good and evil, and a ready symbolism to hand: light symbolises good, and darkness evil, as it does in the Bible.

In The Fellowship of the Ring, the first evil being that the Hobbits encounter after leaving the Shire on the quest to destroy the One Ring is Old Man Willow, a powerful tree or tree-spirit who controls much of the Old Forest. He is wholly malevolent. (Note: Tolkien 1954a, book 1, ch. 7 "In the House of Tom Bombadil") Outside the entrance to Moria, the Company is again attacked, this time by the Watcher in the Water. It specifically seizes Frodo, the ring-bearer, as if it knew and opposed the quest. (Note: Tolkien 1954a, book 2, ch. 4 "A Journey in the Dark") Evans comments that though clearly deadly dangerous, the monster is vague, only sketchily described in the text.

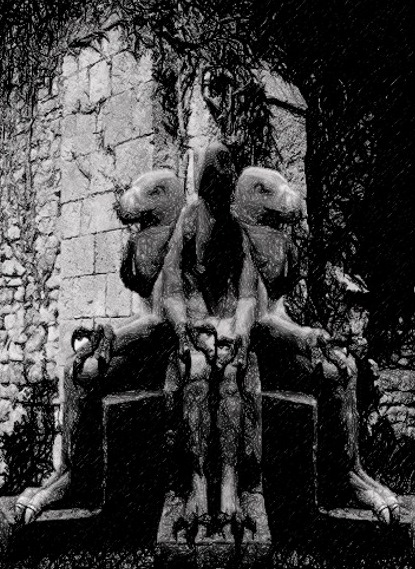
One of the two "monstrous Watchers" of the Tower of Cirith Ungol, aware but immobile, possibly not even living (Note: Tolkien 1955, book 6, ch. 1 "The Tower of Cirith Ungol")

Evans notes that "vaguer still", possibly not even living, are the "monstrous Watchers" that guard the gate of the Tower of Cirith Ungol, on a pass into the evil land of Mordor. Tolkien describes them as aware, but immobile, with an indwelling "spirit of evil vigilance":

They were like great figures seated upon thrones. Each had three joined bodies, and three heads facing outward, and inward, and across the gateway. The heads had vulture-faces, and on their great knees were laid clawlike hands. They seemed to be carved out of huge blocks of stone, immovable, and yet they were aware: some dreadful spirit of evil vigilance abode in them. They knew an enemy. Visible or invisible none could pass unheeded. They would forbid his entry, or his escape.

The monstrous Watchers are defeated by the Elvish light of the Phial of Galadriel; Sam holds it up "and the shadows under the dark arch fled"; Sam sees "a glitter in the black stones of their eyes", full of malice, and their will is broken.

The light of the Phial of Galadriel is effective, too, against Middle-earth's giant spider Shelob, daughter of the line of the evil Ungoliant. Shelob is both evil and ancient, "bloated and grown fat with endless brooding on her feasts, weaving webs of shadow; for all living things were her food, and her vomit darkness". (Note: Tolkien 1954, book 4, chapter 9: "Shelob's Lair.") The opposition of Galadriel and Shelob has been interpreted psychologically in terms of Jungian archetypes. The medievalist Alaric Hall states more generally that in The Lord of the Rings, as in Beowulf and the Grettis saga, the opposition of protagonists and monsters is psychological as much as physical, since "heroes cannot defeat their enemies without taking something from them to themselves." The Tolkien scholar Verlyn Flieger writes that Galadriel's light is a splintered remnant of that of the Two Trees of Valinor, which were consumed into the limitless darkness of Shelob's earliest ancestor, Ungoliant. That light contained and symbolised divine power; its destruction was the embodiment of evil.

=== Undead ===
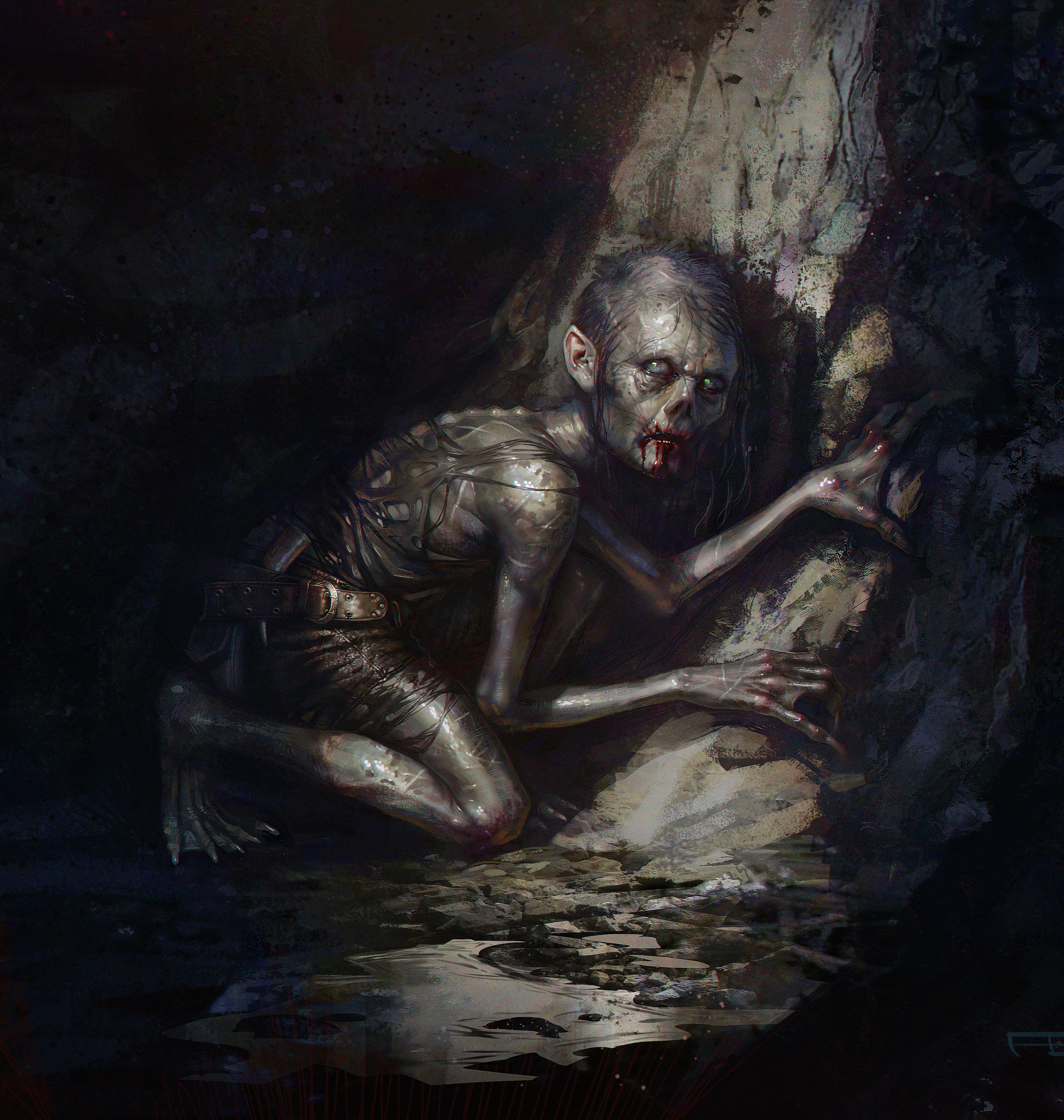
Alive long past his expected lifespan, but monstrous: (Note: Tolkien 1954a, book 1, ch. 2 "The Shadow of the Past") Gollum by Frederic Bennet, 2014 (detail)

Other monsters in The Lord of the Rings are humanoid, but undead, like the barrow-wight who traps the Hobbits soon after they have left Tom Bombadil's house. Such wights are found in Norse mythology. (Note: Tolkien 1954a, book 1, ch. 8 "Fog on the Barrow-downs") Far more powerful are the Nazgûl, undead and invisible but still physical ringwraiths, able to ride horses and to wield weapons; they were once kings of Men, but were trapped by Sauron with the gift of Rings of Power. (Note: Tolkien 1977, "Akallabêth") (Note: Tolkien 1980, 4. "The Hunt for the Ring" i. "Of the Journey of the Black Riders")

Gollum, too, once a member of a peaceful group of Hobbits, has become a desperate monster, alive but with his mind almost destroyed, constantly seeking the One Ring, after bearing it for many centuries. (Note: Tolkien 1937, ch. 5 "Riddles in the Dark") Flieger suggests that Gollum is Tolkien's central monster-figure, likening him to both Grendel and the Beowulf dragon, "the twisted, broken, outcast hobbit whose manlike shape and dragonlike greed combine both the Beowulf kinds of monster in one figure".

=== Souls and sentience ===
Orcs are depicted as wholly evil, meaning that they could be slaughtered without regret. All the same, Orcs are human-like in being able to speak, and in having a similar concept of good and evil, a moral sense of fairness, even if they are not able to apply their morals to themselves. This presented Tolkien, a devout Roman Catholic, with a problem: since "evil cannot make, only mock", the at least somewhat sentient and morally-aware Orcs could not have been created by evil as a genuinely new and separate species; but the alternative, that they were corrupted from one of Middle-earth's free peoples, such as Elves, which would imply that they were fully sentient and had immortal souls, was equally unpalatable to him. Tolkien realized that some of the decisions he had made in his 1937 children's book The Hobbit, showing his goblins (orcs) as even slightly civilised, and giving his animals the power of speech, clearly implied sentience; this conflicted with the more measured theology behind his Legendarium. The Tolkien scholar Tom Shippey writes that the orcs in The Lord of the Rings were almost certainly created just to equip Middle-earth with "a continual supply of enemies over whom one need feel no compunction", or in Tolkien's words from "Beowulf: The Monsters and the Critics", "the infantry of the old war", ready to be slaughtered. Shippey states that all the same, orcs share the human concept of good and evil, with a familiar sense of morality, though he comments that, like many people, orcs are quite unable to apply their morals to themselves. In his view, Tolkien, as a Catholic, took it as a given that "evil cannot make, only mock", so orcs could not have an equal and opposite morality to that of men or elves. Shippey notes that in The Two Towers, Tolkien has the orc Gorbag disapprove of the "regular elvish trick" of seeming to abandon a comrade, as he wrongly supposes Sam has done with Frodo. Shippey describes the implied view of evil as Boethian, that evil is the absence of good; he notes however that Tolkien did not agree with that point of view, believing that evil had to be actively combatted, with war if necessary, the Manichean position.

Wargs, great wolf-like beasts, can attack independently, as they do while the Fellowship of the Ring is going south from Rivendell, (Note: Tolkien 1954a, book 2, ch. 4 "A Journey in the Dark") and soon after Thorin's Company emerged from the Misty Mountains. The group of wargs in The Hobbit could speak, though never pleasantly. (Note: Tolkien 1937, ch. 6 "Out of the Frying-pan into the Fire") Hartley treats wargs as "personified animals", noting that Tolkien writes about their actions using verbs like "[to] plan" and "[to] guard", implying in his view that the wargs are monstrous, "more than mere beasts"; but all the same, he denies that they "possess autonomous wills".

=== Fallen angels ===
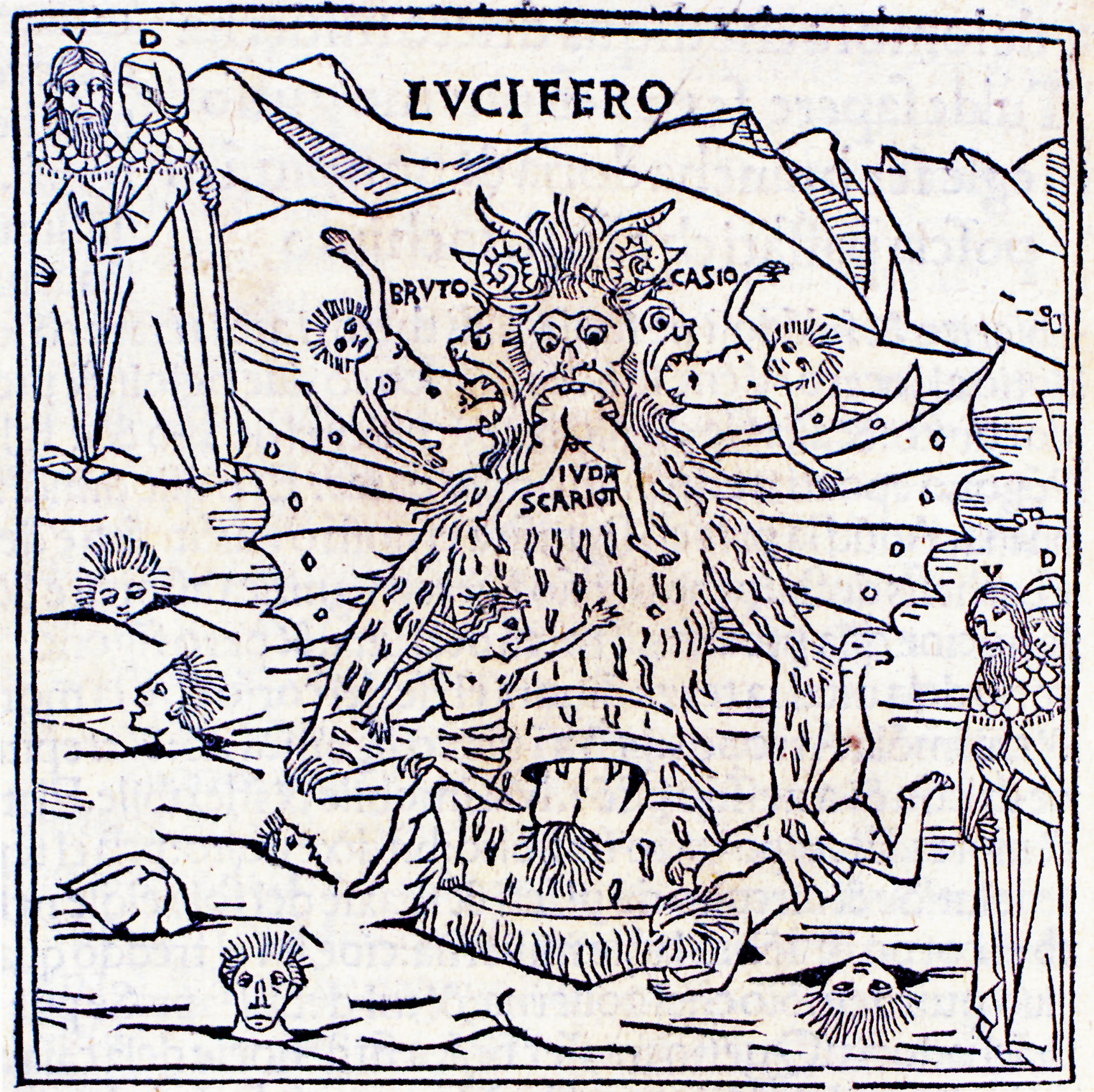
Melkor has been compared to Lucifer as he is a powerful spirit-being and rebels against his creator. Illustration of Lucifer devouring human souls for Dante Alighieri's Inferno, canto 33. Pietro di Piasi, Venice, 1491.

Some of Tolkien's monsters are certainly sentient, as they are angel-like beings, powerful Ainur, fallen into evil. This is just as in Christianity, where the devil Lucifer is understood to be a fallen angel, having been indeed once the greatest of the angels. These characters had immortal souls, were created good by the one God (Eru Iluvatar in the Legendarium), but had made the choice of evil by their own free will. The evil Lords of the Legendarium are extremely powerful. Melkor (later renamed Morgoth) particularly resembles Lucifer, as he is described as having been the most powerful of the Ainur before he turned to darkness. He has indeed been interpreted as analogous to Satan as, like Lucifer, he rebels against his creator. He physically and symbolically destroys the Two Trees of Valinor, which brought light to the world. When some of their light is captured and embodied in the jewel-like Silmarils, he steals them and places them in his crown. (Note: Tolkien 1977, "Quenta Silmarillion", ch. 6 "Of Fëanor and the Unchaining of Melkor") (Note: Tolkien 1977, "Quenta Silmarillion", ch. 9 "Of the Flight of the Noldor")

Morgoth's servant, Sauron, was similarly described as the Dark Lord; he had been a Maia serving the Vala Aulë but, on betraying the other Maiar, became Morgoth's principal lieutenant and then, in the absence of Morgoth, the Dark Lord of Middle-earth in his own right. Tolkien has a character in The Lord of the Rings, Elrond, state that "Nothing is evil in the beginning. Even Sauron was not so."

The fire-demons or Balrogs, too, come into this category, at least in Tolkien's later writings, where they were described as Maia corrupted by Melkor. (Note: Tolkien 1977, "Valaquenta") In The Lord of the Rings, the Wizard Gandalf names the Balrog of Khazad-Dum as "a foe beyond any of you" and "flame of Udûn", meaning an immortal but evil being, with power similar to his own. (Note: Tolkien 1954a, book 2, ch. 5 "The Bridge of Khazad-dûm")

== Adaptations and legacy ==
Tolkien's Middle-earth and its monsters have been documented in Clash of the Gods: Tolkien's Monsters, a 2009 television programme in the History Channel's Clash of the Gods series. Jason Seratino, writing on Complex, has listed his ten favourite Tolkien monsters in movies, describing the Great Goblin as "a slimy cross between Sloth and the Elephant Man". Artists including Alan Lee, John Howe, (Note: Such as Howe's painting of a Nazgûl riding a winged monster, File:Darktower.jpg.) and Ted Nasmith have created paintings of Tolkien's monsters, including those published in Tolkien's Dragons & Monsters: A Book of 20 Postcards.
