= Jonathan Evans (scholar) =

Jonathan Evans is a professor of medieval languages and literature at the University of Georgia. He is known as a Tolkien scholar, including for his 2006 book Ents, Elves, and Eriador and his contributions to The J. R. R. Tolkien Encyclopedia.

== Life ==
Jonathan Evans studied English at Asbury College, earning his B.A. in 1976. He gained an M.A., also in English, in 1978 at Indiana University, where he completed his Ph.D. in British Literature in 1984. That year he joined the faculty at the University of Georgia, where he is a professor of medieval languages and literature. Courses he has taught include early English, medieval languages and literature, and both environmental and fantasy literature. In addition, he researches and teaches on Tolkien studies, with topics including the languages of Middle-earth.

Evans lives with his wife in Athens, Georgia. They have three children.

== Writing ==
=== Ents, Elves, and Eriador ===
Brian McFadden, reviewing Ents, Elves, and Eriador, finds the book's argument plausible, Christianity notwithstanding, since "the basic principles of stewardship that Dickerson and Evans lay out are in line with those of many environmental writers", while their Tolkien scholarship was right up to date.

=== An Introduction to Old English ===
Caroline Batten, reviewing Evans's An Introduction to Old English in The Medieval Review, writes that it offers "a well-designed, substantive, and entirely authoritative course plan" for teaching the language, including both its historical and its linguistic contexts. She finds Evans's use of the Anglo-Saxon Chronicle "especially commendable".

=== Tolkien the Medievalist ===
Shaun Hughes, reviewing Tolkien the Medievalist in Tolkien Studies, writes that Evans's essay "The anthropology of Arda", on humans in Tolkien's world of Middle-earth, is "long and densely argued". Hughes disagrees with Evans's restriction of this to Tolkien's "Men", as Tolkien, he writes, followed the Old Norse conception of treating all the humanoid races as menn, whether they were mennskir (human) or not. But he finds the essay useful in exploring Tolkien's humans, as this was the one "race" that Tolkien did not "invent", even if dwarves and elves existed (in some form) and hobbits are "counted under human kind". Hughes notes that Evans compares how Tolkien and Milton addressed "parallel problems" like the fall of man in their Bible-related stories.

== Works ==
=== Books ===
- 2006 Ents, Elves, and Eriador: J.R.R. Tolkien's Environmental Vision (with Matthew Dickerson)
- 2008 Dragons: Myth and Legend
- 2020 An Introduction to Old English

=== Chapters ===
Evans has contributed chapters to books including:

- 1987 Mythical and Fabulous Creatures: A Sourcebook and Research Guide
- 1990 Dictionary of Literary Biography
- 1993 Medieval Scandinavia: An Encyclopedia
- 2000 J.R.R. Tolkien and His Literary Resonances
- 2000 The Encyclopedia of Medieval Folklore
- 2003 Tolkien the Medievalist
- 2006 The J. R. R. Tolkien Encyclopedia – 10 entries, inc. 'Dragons', 'Dwarves', 'Mirkwood', 'Monsters', and 'Saruman'
- 2008 The Facts on File Companion to Pre-1600 British Poetry
- 2014 Arda Inhabited: Environmental Relationships in The Lord of the Rings
