= Christianity in Middle-earth =

Theme in Tolkien's legendarium

Christianity is a central theme in J. R. R. Tolkien's fictional works about Middle-earth, but the specifics are always kept hidden. This allows for the books' meaning to be personally interpreted by the reader, instead of the author detailing a strict, set meaning.

J. R. R. Tolkien was a devout Catholic from boyhood, and he described The Lord of the Rings in particular as a "fundamentally religious and Catholic work; unconsciously so at first, but consciously in the revision". (Note: Carpenter 2023, Letters #142 to Robert Murray, S.J., 2 December 1953) While he insisted it was not an allegory, it contains numerous themes from Christian theology. These include the battle of good versus evil, the triumph of humility over pride, and the activity of grace. A central theme is death and immortality, with light as a symbol of divine creation, but Tolkien's attitudes as to mercy and pity, resurrection, the Eucharist, salvation, repentance, self-sacrifice, free will, justice, fellowship, authority and healing can also be detected. Divine providence appears indirectly as the will of the Valar, godlike immortals, expressed subtly enough to avoid compromising people's free will. The Silmarillion embodies a detailed narrative of the splintering of the original created light, and of the fall of man in the shape of several incidents including the Akallabêth (The Downfall of Númenor).

There is no single Christ-figure comparable to C. S. Lewis's Aslan in his Narnia books, but the characters of Gandalf, Frodo, and Aragorn exemplify the threefold office, the prophetic, priestly, and kingly aspects of Christ, respectively.

== Context ==
=== Middle-earth ===
Middle-earth is the generic name for the setting of much of the English writer J. R. R. Tolkien's fantasy, and more specifically the central continent of his world of Arda. Works set there include his 1937 children's book The Hobbit, his 1954–55 novel The Lord of the Rings, and his 1977 work The Silmarillion. These works are set in an imagined time in the distant pagan past of the Earth's history, long before Christianity. (Note: Carpenter 2023, #211 to Rhona Beare, 14 October 1958, last footnote)

=== Tolkien's Catholicism ===
Tolkien was a devout Catholic. He described The Lord of the Rings as rich in Christian symbolism, as he explained in a letter to his close friend and Jesuit priest, Robert Murray:

The Lord of the Rings is of course a fundamentally religious and Catholic work; unconsciously so at first, but consciously in the revision. That is why I have not put in, or have cut out, practically all references to anything like 'religion', to cults or practices, in the imaginary world. For the religious element is absorbed into the story and the symbolism.

The Tolkien scholar Patrick Curry writes that Tolkien's statement however elides the paganism that pervades the work; it may be fundamentally Christian, but on other levels it is another matter, with its pagan polytheism and animism, and many other features. In other words, Middle-earth is both Christian and pagan. The Tolkien scholar Paul H. Kocher comments that "having made the times pre-Christian, [Tolkien] has freed himself from the need to deal with them in a Christian context, which would be awkward if applied to elves, ents, dwarves, and the rest."

Many theological themes underlie the narrative, including the battle of good versus evil, the triumph of humility over pride, and the activity of grace, as seen with Frodo's pity toward Gollum. The work includes the themes of death and immortality, mercy and pity, resurrection, salvation, repentance, self-sacrifice, free will, justice, fellowship, authority and healing. Tolkien mentions the Lord's Prayer, especially the line "And lead us not into temptation but deliver us from evil" in connection with Frodo's struggles against the power of the One Ring. (Note: Carpenter 2023, Letters #181 to Michael Straight, drafts, early 1956) Tolkien said "Of course God is in The Lord of the Rings. The period was pre-Christian, but it was a monotheistic world", and when questioned who was the One God of Middle-earth, Tolkien replied "The one, of course! The book is about the world that God created – the actual world of this planet."

The Bible and traditional Christian narrative also influenced The Silmarillion. The conflict between Melkor and Eru Ilúvatar parallels that between Satan and God. Further, The Silmarillion tells of the creation and fall of the Elves, as Genesis tells of the creation and fall of Man. As with all of Tolkien's works, The Silmarillion allows room for later Christian history, and one version of Tolkien's drafts even has Finrod, a character in The Silmarillion, speculating on the necessity of Eru Ilúvatar's eventual Incarnation to save Mankind. (Note: Tolkien 1993 Morgoth's Ring, "Athrabeth Finrod Ah Andreth", pp. 322, 335) A specifically Christian influence is the notion of the fall of man, which influenced the Ainulindalë, the Kinslaying at Alqualondë, and the fall of Númenor. (Note: Carpenter 2023, Letters #131 to Milton Waldman, late 1951)

== Role ==
Commentators including some Christians have taken a wide range of positions on the role of Christianity in Tolkien's fiction, especially in The Lord of the Rings. They note that it contains representations of Christ and angels in characters such as the wizards, the resurrection, the motifs of light, hope, and redemptive suffering, the apparent invisibility of Christianity in the novel, and not least the nature of evil, an ancient debate in Christian philosophy, that has led to lengthy scholarly argument about Tolkien's position in the book. Commentators disagree in particular on whether The Lord of the Rings is a Christian work, despite Tolkien's statement that it is.

=== Not specifically Christian ===
Catherine Madsen writes that she found herself drawn to faith by the novel, "yet not particularly to the Christian faith". She notes that Tolkien wrote that "Myth and fairy-story, as all art, reflect and contain in solution elements of moral and religious truth (or error), but not explicit[ly]". She states that Tolkien clearly "did not intend his work to argue or illustrate or promulgate Christianity". In her view, Tolkien uses "Christian magic", not doctrine; she notes that Tolkien wrote that Middle-earth was "a monotheistic world of 'natural theology'". (Note: Carpenter 2023, Letters #165 to Houghton Mifflin, 30 June 1955) The "natural religion" of the book is, she argues, based on matters such as the Elves and their longing for the sea, creating a "religious feeling ... curiously compatible with a secular cosmology". A world of religion without revelation, she writes, is necessarily ambiguous, and any triumph over evil also diminishes the good, so the world inevitably fades. Hence, what The Lord of the Rings offers is not a supernatural hope, but what Tolkien called "recovery", the reawakening of the senses, an unmediated attention to the present, as when Sam looks up into the night sky in Mordor, and is struck by the beauty of a star. To Madsen, this is "the most compelling thing about the book, and also the least Christian ... available to anyone of any persuasion, and not contingent upon belief."

=== Clearly purposive ===
The Tolkien scholar Tom Shippey notes that Tolkien stated in the foreword to the second edition of The Lord of the Rings that (Note: The Lord of the Rings, "Foreword to the Second Edition")

it is neither allegorical nor topical ... I cordially dislike allegory in all its manifestations ... I much prefer history, true or feigned, with its varied applicability to the thought and experience of readers.

Despite this, writes Shippey, Tolkien certainly did sometimes write allegories, giving the example of Leaf by Niggle, and there is certainly meant to be some relationship between his fiction and fact. He notes, too, that Tolkien deliberately "approach[ed] to the edge of Christian reference" by placing the destruction of the Ring and the fall of Sauron on 25 March, the traditional Anglo-Saxon date of the crucifixion of Christ and of the annunciation, and of the last day of the Genesis creation. Other commentators have noted further echoes of Christian themes, including the presence of Christ figures, the resurrection, hope, and redemptive suffering.

Paul Kocher, in his book Master of Middle-earth, writes that "having made the times pre-Christian, [Tolkien] has freed himself from the need to deal with them in a Christian context, which would be awkward if applied to elves, ents, dwarves, and the rest." On the other hand, Kocher notes that Elrond ascribes purpose to events including the summoning of the Free Peoples to his council; Elrond uses the words "purpose", "called", "ordered", and "believe", implying "some living will". Similarly, he comments, Gandalf firmly tells Denethor, the despairing Steward of Gondor, that suicide is forbidden and indeed is "heathen".

=== Concealed Christianity ===
Concealed Christianity in The Lord of the Rings

The scholar of theology and literature Ralph C. Wood, in his 2003 book The Gospel According to Tolkien, concludes "Christians are called to be hobbit-like servants of the King and his Kingdom. Frodo and Sam are first in the reign of Iluvatar because they are willing to be last and least among those who 'move the wheels of the world'". Wood notes, too, that the elves' lembas waybread is "reminiscent of the eucharistic wafer: its airy lightness gives strength in direct disproportion to its weight". Pat Pinsent, in A Companion to J. R. R. Tolkien, states that "his own devout adherence to Catholicism is in fact reflected throughout his writing, to the extent that ... his faith was the driving force behind his literary endeavors".

The Episcopal priest and theologian Fleming Rutledge, in her 2004 book The Battle for Middle-earth: Tolkien's Divine Design in 'The Lord of the Rings', writes that Tolkien had constructed his book both as an exciting surface narrative, and as a deep theological narrative. She cites his statement that "I am a Christian (which can be deduced from my stories)." (Note: Carpenter 2023, Letters #213 to Deborah Webster, 25 October 1958) In her view, Tolkien very rarely allows the hints and suggestions of divine intervention to break the surface, but that the cumulative effect of his "veiled substructure" can have a powerful effect on the reader. She writes that Tolkien was providing "a rare glimpse of what human freedom within God's Divine Plan really means." She notes that while Tolkien had said The Lord of the Rings was fundamentally religious, Middle-earth appears "a curiously nonreligious world". Her view is that this was entirely deliberate, as Tolkien wanted to avoid any hint of pantheism, worship of the natural world; and while Arda is, as Tolkien wrote, "my own mother-earth", the action is set long before the Christian era; she points out that he wrote in a letter that

We are in a time when the One God, Eru, is known to exist by the Wise, but is not approachable save by or through the Valar, though he is still remembered in (unspoken) prayer by those of Númenórean descent." (Note: Carpenter 2023, Letters, #297 to Mr Rang, draft, August 1967)

The scholar Verlyn Flieger writes that Tolkien's fantasy "has no explicit Christianity", unlike the medieval Arthurian legends "with their miracles, pious hermits, heavy-handed symbolism, and allegorical preachiness". Tolkien's Middle-earth, "greatly to his credit", avoided preachiness and allegory. On the subject of making Christianity explicit in fantasy, he wrote:

For reasons which I will not elaborate, that seems to me fatal. Myth and fairy-story must, as all art, reflect and contain in solution elements of moral and religious truth (or error), but not explicit, not in the known form of the primary "real" world. (Note: Tolkien 1977, p. xii)

Flieger comments that the word "fatal" is to be taken literally: an explicit Christian message "would have killed the work", draining the life from the secondary world, and that Tolkien had indeed written in a letter:

That is why I have not put in, or have cut out, practically all references to anything like 'religion', to cults or practices, in the imaginary world. For the religious element is absorbed into the story and the symbolism.

== Christ ==
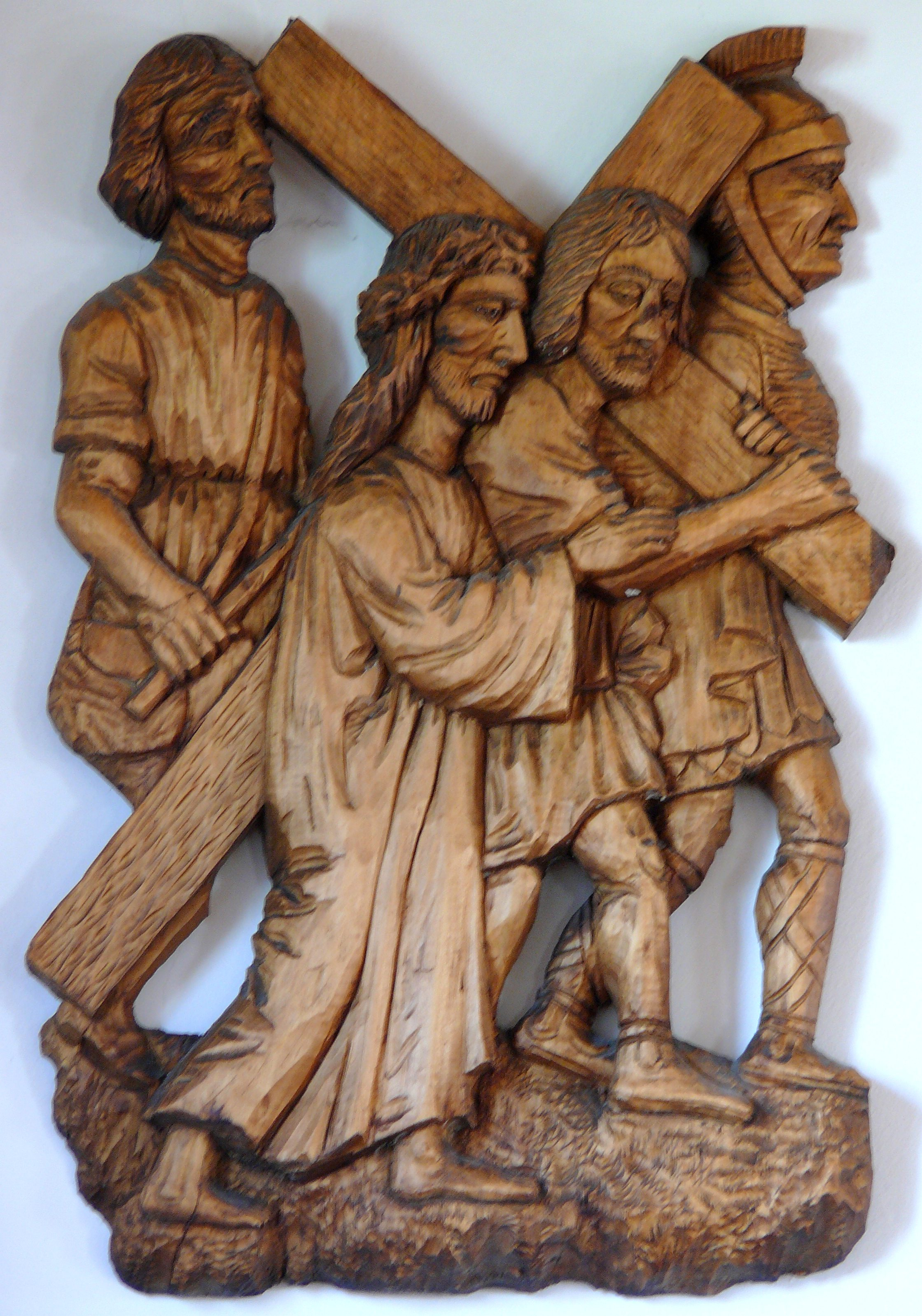
Frodo has been compared to Christ, and Sam, who carried Frodo on the way to Mount Doom, to Simon of Cyrene, who carried Christ's cross to Golgotha. Church of St. John Nepomucen, Brenna

=== Christ figures ===
Peter Kreeft's analysis of Christ-figures in The Lord of the Rings
Christ-like attribute	Gandalf	Frodo	Aragorn
Sacrificial death	Dies in Moria	Symbolically dies under Morgul-knife	Takes Paths of the Dead
Resurrection	Reborn as Gandalf the White (Note: Other commentators such as Jane Chance have compared this transformed reappearance to the Transfiguration of Jesus.)	Healed by Elrond (Note: Also by other commentators, such as Mathews, Richard (2016). Fantasy: The Liberation of Imagination. Routledge. p. 69. ISBN 978-1-136-78554-2.)	Reappears in Gondor
Saviour	All three help to save Middle-earth from Sauron		
Threefold Messianic symbolism	Prophet	Priest	King

The philosopher Peter Kreeft, like Tolkien a Catholic, observes that there is no one complete, concrete, visible Christ figure in The Lord of the Rings comparable to Aslan in C. S. Lewis's Chronicles of Narnia series. However, Kreeft and Jean Chausse have identified reflections of the figure of Jesus Christ in three protagonists of The Lord of the Rings: Gandalf, Frodo and Aragorn. While Chausse found "facets of the personality of Jesus" in them, Kreeft wrote that "they exemplify the Old Testament threefold Messianic symbolism of prophet (Gandalf), priest (Frodo), and king (Aragorn)".

=== Baptism ===
Baptism, the rite which welcomes Christians into the new life of the Church by immersing them in water, symbolically drowning their old life, has been identified in aspects of the story in The Lord of the Rings. One is the water of the fountain called the Mirror of Galadriel. Rutledge suggests that if this does symbolise baptism, then the fountain's water should protect against Sauron's evil will "to penetrate the defences even of the wise", such as Galadriel's guarding of her Elf-realm of Lothlórien. She notes that some of the water is held in the Phial of Galadriel, which protects Frodo and Sam on their way into Mordor.

A very different symbol is the dark underground Dwarf-realm of Moria. Here, the nine members of the Fellowship of the Ring enter, are submerged, and re-emerge on the other side of the mountains, symbolically having gone through death and been reborn; one of them, Gandalf, actually dies there, though he too is reborn.

=== Healing ===
Aragorn is acclaimed as King of Gondor by his own people, following their old proverb that the hands of a King are the hands of a healer. He goes about after the battle, using the healing herb Athelas or "Kingsfoil" to revive those stricken by the Black Breath, the evil of the Nazgûl. Rutledge comments on the echoes of the Samaritan woman at the well, who tells her people to come and see the miraculous man who spoke to her: "Come, see a man who told me all that I ever did. Can this be the Christ?", and about Aragorn's laying his hand on Merry's head and calling him by name, recalling Christ's raising up of Jairus's daughter.

=== Resurrection ===
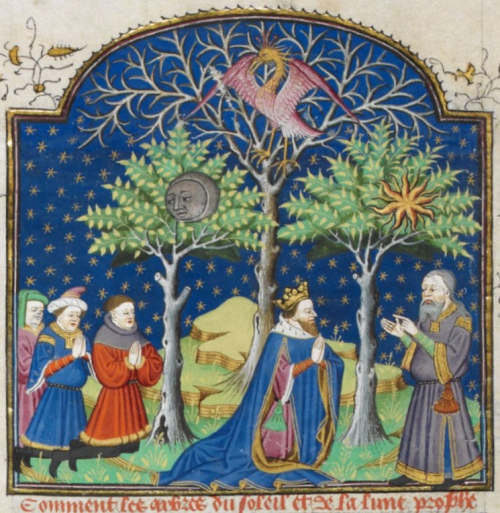
The lifeless White Tree of Gondor has been compared to the Dry Tree of medieval legend, a symbol of resurrection and new life. Medieval manuscript illustration of the Dry Tree (centre) with the Phoenix, flanked by the Trees of the Sun and the Moon. Rouen 1444-1445

Several commentators have seen Gandalf's passage through the Mines of Moria, dying to save his companions and returning as "Gandalf the White", as a symbol of the resurrection of Christ. Like Jesus who carried his cross for the sins of mankind, Frodo carried a burden of evil on behalf of the whole world. Frodo walks his "Via Dolorosa" to Mount Doom, just like Jesus who made his way to Golgotha. As Frodo approaches the Cracks of Doom, the Ring becomes a crushing weight, just as the cross was for Jesus. Sam Gamgee, Frodo's servant, who carries Frodo up to Mount Doom, parallels Simon of Cyrene, who helps Jesus by carrying his cross to Golgotha. When Frodo accomplishes his mission, like Christ, he says "it is done". Just as Christ ascends to heaven, Frodo's life in Middle-earth comes to an end when he departs to the Undying Lands.

Another symbol of resurrection is the White Tree, the symbol of Gondor. It stood dry and lifeless in the Court of the Fountain at the top of the city of Minas Tirith throughout the centuries that Gondor was ruled by the Stewards; Aragorn brought a sapling of the White Tree into the city on his return as King. The White Tree has been likened to the Dry Tree of the 14th century Travels of Sir John Mandeville. The tale runs that the Dry Tree has been lifeless since the crucifixion of Christ, but that it will flower afresh when "a prince of the west side of the world should sing a mass beneath it", while the apples of the trees allow people to live for 500 years.

=== Transfiguration ===
A dramatic event in The Lord of the Rings is the reappearance of Gandalf, or as the Elf Legolas names him in a joyous shout of recognition, "Mithrandir!" Tolkien scholars and theologians have called this a transfiguration. Rutledge considers the Biblical echoes unmistakable, likening the event to the Transfiguration of Christ on the mountaintop. Among the parallels are the fact that Gandalf stands above the companions, and his robes and hair are "gleaming white". She notes that the return of Moses from Mount Sinai, his face shining too bright to look at with the reflected light of God, could be a closer parallel, as Aragorn comments that his sight had been "veiled".

At least two other events in The Lord of the Rings have been called transfigurations. One is the change in the seemingly-crippled King Théoden of Rohan, when Gandalf visits his hall, Edoras, and lifts him out of the control of the traitor Wormtongue, who has been controlling Rohan on behalf of the Wizard Saruman. Gandalf gets the King to straighten up, stand, and walk outside his hall, and to grasp his own sword. Gandalf "announces 'The Lord of the Mark comes forth!' and the king's entire aspect is transformed as he straightens his back to meet Gandalf's description". The other is Aragorn's splendour at his coronation, with the "stately procession of the Knights of the West" into the victorious city of Minas Tirith, the liveries:

green with a white horse for Rohan, blue with a silver swan for Dol Amroth, and black or grey with silver for Gondor. At the head of them all is Aragorn, transfigured, leading the Grey Company of the Dúnedain; but Éomer King of Rohan is with him, and Prince Imrahil, and Gandalf in pure white

== Christian life ==
=== Hope ===
The motif of hope is illustrated in Aragorn's successful handling of Saruman's seeing-stone or palantír. Aragorn is given the very name of "Hope" (Sindarin "Estel"), by which he is still affectionately called by his queen, Arwen, who at the hour of his death cries out "Estel, Estel!". Only Aragorn, as the heir of Isildur, can rightfully use the palantír, while Saruman and Denethor, who have both also made extensive use of palantírs, have fallen into despair or presumption. These latter traits have been identified as the two distinct sins "against the virtue of Hope".

=== Redemptive suffering ===
The Christian theme of the redemptive and penitential nature of suffering is apparent in the dreadful ordeal of Sam and Frodo in Mordor. The Catholic author Stratford Caldecott calls Frodo "a very 'Christian' type of hero. ... He allows himself to be humiliated and crucified." In a different way, Boromir atones for his assault on Frodo by single-handedly but vainly defending Merry and Pippin from orcs, which illustrates another significant Christian theme: immortality of the soul and the importance of good intention, especially at the point of death. This is clear from Gandalf's statement: "But he [Boromir] escaped in the end.... It was not in vain that the young hobbits came with us, if only for Boromir's sake." (Note: Tolkien 1954, The Two Towers, book 3, ch 5 "The White Rider")

=== Moral conflict ===
Rosebury writes that The Lord of the Rings is saved from simple moralising or allegory by the presence of realistically complicated moral conflict within the characters: the "good" characters are challenged by temptations, while the "evil" characters all have good sides, were once good, or hesitate over evil actions.

Rosebury's analysis of moral conflict in The Lord of the Rings characters
Character	Morality	Nature	Moral ambiguity
Sauron	Evil	Fallen angel (Maia); Pride, desire for power	"Nothing is evil in the beginning. Even Sauron was not so." – Elrond
Gollum	Evil	Hobbit corrupted by the Ring	"An old starved pitiable thing" wavers over betraying Frodo and Sam
Saruman	Evil	Fallen Wizard (Maia); Pride, desire for power	"was great once, of a noble kind that we should not dare to raise our hands against"
Frodo	Good	"best hobbit in the Shire"; Nearly pacifist in "The Scouring of the Shire" (at end)	Says Bilbo should have killed Gollum (at start); Corrupted by Ring, claims it in Mount Doom
Boromir	Evil → Good	Well-intentioned; covets Ring as weapon; tries to steal it from Frodo	Repents and sacrifices his life trying to save the hobbits Merry and Pippin
Théoden	Evil → Good	Corrupted into inaction by Wormtongue	Revived by Gandalf, takes wise and bold action, dies hero's death in battle

Rutledge writes that moral conflict, as seen in the struggle within Gollum, is central both to the narrative and to the "underlying theological drama". Far from being a battle of good people against evil monsters, she writes, the evil is within each individual, citing Saint Paul's comment in Romans 3:9–10 that "none is righteous, no, not one".

=== Prayer ===
In a scene in The Lord of the Rings when the Hobbits Frodo and Sam are travelling through Ithilien, Faramir explains to the Hobbits that before eating, he and his men look West from Middle-earth to the lost island kingdom of their ancestors, Númenor, to Valinor (Elvenhome) which still exists, but is removed from Arda (the planet), and "that which is beyond Elvenhome".

Tolkien rarely breaks his rule to avoid explicit religion of any kind, but when Frodo and Sam have dinner with Faramir in his hidden fastness of Henneth Annûn, all the Men turn towards the west in a brief silence. Faramir explains that

We look towards Númenor that was, and beyond to Elvenhome that is, and to that which is beyond Elvenhome and will ever be.

Rutledge notes the parallel of this action, that she calls a sort of prayer, with the Gloria Patri of Christian liturgy,

As it was in the beginning, is now, and ever shall be".

She comments that while the mention of Númenor could be a romantic nostalgia, there is also an echo of the Christian identity exiled from the Garden of Eden, and always seeking its true home. The mention of what is beyond Elvenhome, she writes, "invokes the transcendent dimension", and is an "austere acknowledgement" of monotheism.

=== The Eucharist ===
Tolkien wrote of the Eucharist or Blessed Sacrament that it was "the one great thing to love on earth" (Note: Carpenter 2023, Letters #43 to Michael Tolkien, March 6–8, 1941) where, he advised his son Michael, "you will find romance, glory, honour, fidelity, and the true way of all your loves upon earth". He described it as a divine paradox, meaning death but also eternal life. Tolkien alluded to a religious significance of the lembas waybread in The Lord of the Rings in a letter to Forrest J. Ackerman in 1958: (Note: Carpenter 2023, Letters #210 to Forrest J. Ackerman, June 1958)

In the book lembas has two functions. It is a 'machine' or device for making credible the long marches with little provision, in a world in which as I have said "miles are miles". But that is relatively unimportant. It also has a much larger significance, of what one might hesitatingly call a "religious" kind. This becomes later apparent, especially in the chapter "Mount Doom".

Based on Tolkien's statements, Christian commentators have argued that a highly developed Eucharistic symbolism is carried by lembas and its history. This is elaborated further in The Silmarillion, noting that "waybread" can be seen as a translation of viaticum, the Eucharistic food for a journey. In The Silmarillion, the lembas, for example, is given to the Elves to feed them during their Great Journey to the Undying Lands, recalling to Christian commentators God's gift of Manna to the Israelites during their exodus to the Promised Land at Exodus 14. The Maia Melian makes a royal gift of lembas to Beleg, brother-in-arms of the mortal Man Túrin, to be his "help in the wild": (Note: Tolkien 1977, ch. 21, "Of Túrin Turambar")

And she gave him store of lembas, the waybread of the Elves, wrapped in leaves of silver, and the threads that bound it were sealed at the knots with the seal of the Queen, a wafer of white wax shaped as a single flower of Telperion; for according to the customs of the Eldalië the keeping and giving of lembas belonged to the Queen alone.

Tolkien immediately emphasizes the special nature of this gift:

In nothing did Melian show greater favour to Túrin than in this gift; for the Eldar had never before allowed Men to use this waybread, and seldom did so again.

Beleg uses the lembas, along with his Elvish power, to help heal Men of Túrin's company, and later also the Elf Gwindor, who had been enslaved by Morgoth.

An event in The Lord of the Rings has been compared to the Last Supper, the feast commemorated by the Eucharist. The Hobbit Pippin has a sunlit morning meal with his friend Beregond, a Guard of the Citadel, in Minas Tirith just before the coming of the long-expected storm as the forces of Minas Morgul assault the city. Rutledge comments that this "creates a remarkable mood. One might even think of Jesus with his disciples at the Last Supper". Indeed, very soon all who cannot fight leave the city, it grows cold, and a Nazgûl flies ominously across the sun; Rutledge remarks on the biblical echoes.

=== The Christian year ===
Shippey notes that a pair of references to the Christian year, rarely picked up by readers, is that Tolkien chose dates of symbolic importance for the quest to destroy the Ring. It began in Rivendell on 25 December, the date of Christmas, and ended on Mount Doom on 25 March, a traditional Anglo-Saxon date for the crucifixion (the modern date of Easter being moveable, and thus not yielding any fixed calendar date).

== The creation ==
=== Light ===
Coat of arms of Gondor bearing the white tree, Nimloth the fair, descendant of Telperion, one of the Two Trees of Valinor that once lit the world

A theme that runs throughout The Lord of the Rings but is especially clear in The Silmarillion is of light. The scholar of mythology and medieval literature Verlyn Flieger explains that Tolkien equates light with God and the ability to create. She cites from Tolkien's poem Mythopoeia ("Creation of Myth"):

man, sub-creator, the refracted light
through whom is splintered from a single White
to many hues, and endlessly combined
in living shapes that move from mind to mind.
Though all the crannies of the world we filled
with elves and goblins, though we dared to build
gods and their houses out of dark and light,
and sow the seed of dragons, 'twas our right
(used or misused). The right has not decayed.
We make still by the law in which we're made.

Flieger writes that by this, Tolkien meant that an author's ability to create fantasy fiction, or in his terms "subcreation", was derived from and could be seen as a small splinter of the Divine Light, the "single White" of the poem. Further, the whole of The Silmarillion can be seen as a working-out of this theme of Man splintering the original white light of creation "to many hues, and endlessly combined in living shapes" in the forms of the sundering of the Elves into light and dark elves, men good and bad, and dragons and other monsters. This creative light, she states, was for Tolkien equated with the Christian Logos, the Divine Word.

Splintering of the Created Light, with repeated re-creations
Age	Blue/Silver light	Golden light	Jewels
Years of the Lamps	Illuin, sky-blue lamp of Middle-earth, atop tall pillar, Helcar	Ormal, high-gold lamp of Middle-earth, atop tall pillar, Ringil	
ending when Melkor destroys both Lamps
Years of the Trees	Telperion, silver tree, lighting Valinor	Laurelin, golden tree, lighting Valinor	Fëanor crafts 3 Silmarils with light of the Two Trees.
ending when Melkor strikes the Two Trees, and Ungoliant kills them
First Age	Last flower becomes the Moon, carried in male spirit Tilion's ship.	Last fruit becomes the Sun, carried in female spirit Arien's ship.	
First Age	Yavanna makes Galathilion, a tree like Telperion, except that it does not shine, for the Elves' city of Tirion in Valinor.		There is war over the Silmarils.
First Age	Galathilion has many seedlings, including Celeborn on Tol Eressëa		One Silmaril is buried in the Earth, one is lost in the Sea, one sails in the Sky as Eärendil's Star.
Second Age	Celeborn has seedling Nimloth, the White Tree of Númenor.		
Second Age	Númenor is drowned. Isildur brings one fruit of Nimloth to Middle-earth.		
Third Age	A White Tree grows in Minas Tirith while a King rules Gondor.		Galadriel collects light of Eärendil's Star reflected in her fountain mirror.
Third Age	The tree stands dead while Stewards rule.		A little of that light is captured in the Phial of Galadriel.
Third Age	The new King Aragorn brings a White Sapling into the city.		Hobbits Frodo Baggins and Sam Gamgee use the Phial to defeat the giant spider Shelob.

The light begins in The Silmarillion as a unity, and in accordance with the splintering of creation is divided into more and more fragments as the myth progresses. Middle-earth is peopled by the angelic Valar and lit by two great lamps; when these are destroyed by the fallen Vala Melkor, the world is fragmented, and the Valar retreat to Valinor, which is lit by The Two Trees. When these too are destroyed, their last fragment of light is made into the Silmarils, and a sapling too is rescued, leading to the White Tree of Numenor, the living symbol of the Kingdom of Gondor. Wars are fought over the Silmarils, and they are lost to the Earth, the Sea, and the Sky, the last of these, carried by Eärendil the Mariner, becoming the Morning Star. Some of the star's light is captured in Galadriel's Mirror, the magic fountain that allows her to see past, present, and future; and some of that light is, finally, trapped in the Phial of Galadriel, her parting gift to Frodo, the counterbalance to Sauron's evil and powerful Ring that he also carries. At each stage, the fragmentation increases and the power decreases. Thus the theme of light as Divine power, fragmented and refracted through the works of created beings, is central to the whole mythology.

=== Angels ===
The place of Christianity's angels is taken by the immortal Ainur, who are divided into two orders of beings, the Valar and the Maiar. The powerful Valar behave much like the pagan gods of Greek mythology. Flieger calls their role in Middle-earth "eccentric" from a Christian point of view: they are lower than the One God, certainly, but unlike angels they are sub-creators, each with their own realm. So, for instance, Manwë is King of Arda (the Earth), Ulmo is Lord of Waters, Mandos Judge of the Dead, and they were married. This positions them, as Tolkien stated, as demiurges, godlike figures in the Platonic scheme of things with the ability to shape the material world. As with the splintering of light, Flieger writes, the choice of the name "demiurge" implies subdivision, its original meaning including "to do by dividing".

Some Maiar, a lesser order than the Valar, were sent by the Valar into Middle-earth in mortal bodies to influence, but not to direct, events there. This group of Maiar were called Wizards or Istari, of whom Gandalf is the best known to readers. Tolkien stated that they fitted the original Greek description ἄγγελος (Angelos) meaning messenger. (Note: Carpenter 2023, Letters #156 to Robert Murray, S.J., 4 November 1954)

=== The Virgin Mary ===
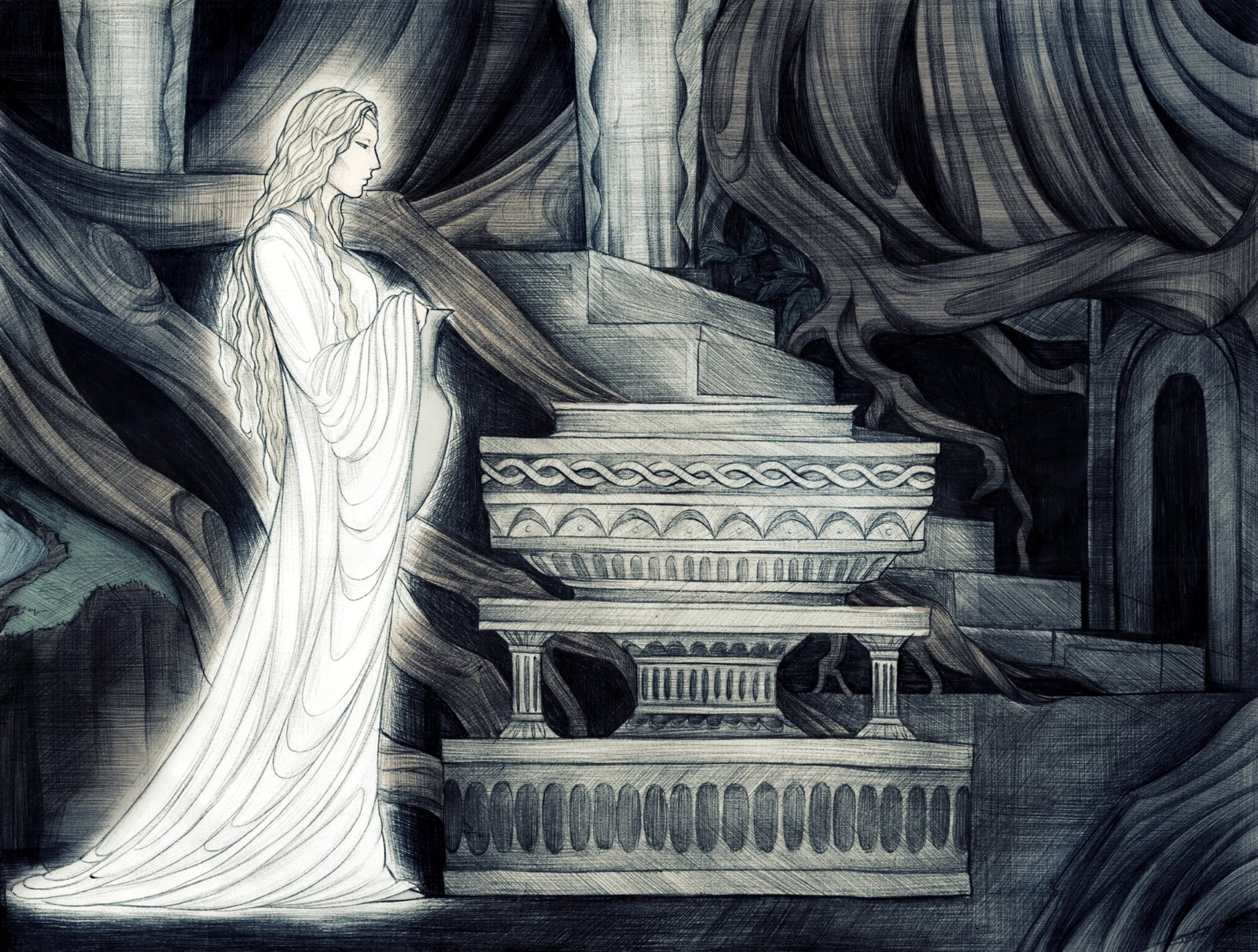
The white Elf-lady Galadriel has been compared to the Virgin Mary. Galadriel at her mirror, by Tessa Boronski, 2011

Two figures in Middle-earth have reminded commentators of the Virgin Mary: the Vala Varda, called by the Elves Elbereth, and the Elf-lady Galadriel. Wood writes that Sam's invocation of Galadriel's name, however unintentional, caused his Elven-rope to release itself from the knot that fastened it, after letting the Hobbits descend a cliff, quoting Sam's explanation "I think the rope came off itself—when I called". (Note: Untier of Knots is a traditional epithet of the Virgin Mary in art and prayer.) Rutledge notes that Frodo, facing the deadly attack of the "pale King", the Nazgûl on Weathertop, cries out O Elbereth! Gilthoniel!, apparently causing Aragorn to arrive just in time: Frodo is dangerously wounded but not killed. Rutledge comments that while there is no direct correspondence between any Lord of the Rings character and any biblical figure, Elbereth does resemble the Virgin Mary in one sense, in that she can grant favours and come to the help of people in need. Similarly, she writes that Sam makes the invocation Elbereth Gilthoniel! as he faces off with Shelob in the darkness of her lair, holding aloft the Phial of Galadriel, which blazes with (in Tolkien's words) an "intolerable light" as if "'his indomitable spirit' had activated it".

=== Providence, predestination, and free will ===
Rutledge considers the question of divine providence, predestination, and free will a central theme of The Lord of the Rings. The question hinges on the apparent contradiction between divine action and intention on one side, and human freedom on the other: if the divine power acts in the world, how can individual action be free? Rutledge notes that theologians have grappled with the problem, and that Tolkien's book can be read as an explanation of how it can work out in practice. The divine will remains almost entirely beneath the surface in the story, as she believes it does in the real world; but Tolkien gives hints throughout the text, most often in the form of statements in the passive voice about the causes of events which might appear to be luck or chance. Thus, for example, Gandalf says that Bilbo and Frodo were "meant" (in the passive voice) to have the One Ring, though it remained their choice to co-operate with this purpose.

Providence is represented in Middle-earth by the will of the Valar. This can be detected but is subtle enough not to affect the free will of the story's characters, or the need for individual courage and trust in the face of an uncertain future. In keeping with that subtlety, the Valar are mentioned directly only once in The Lord of the Rings, when one of Faramir's Rangers of Ithilien encounters the enormous Mumak or battle-elephant of the Haradrim and says "May the Valar turn him aside".

=== Fall of man ===
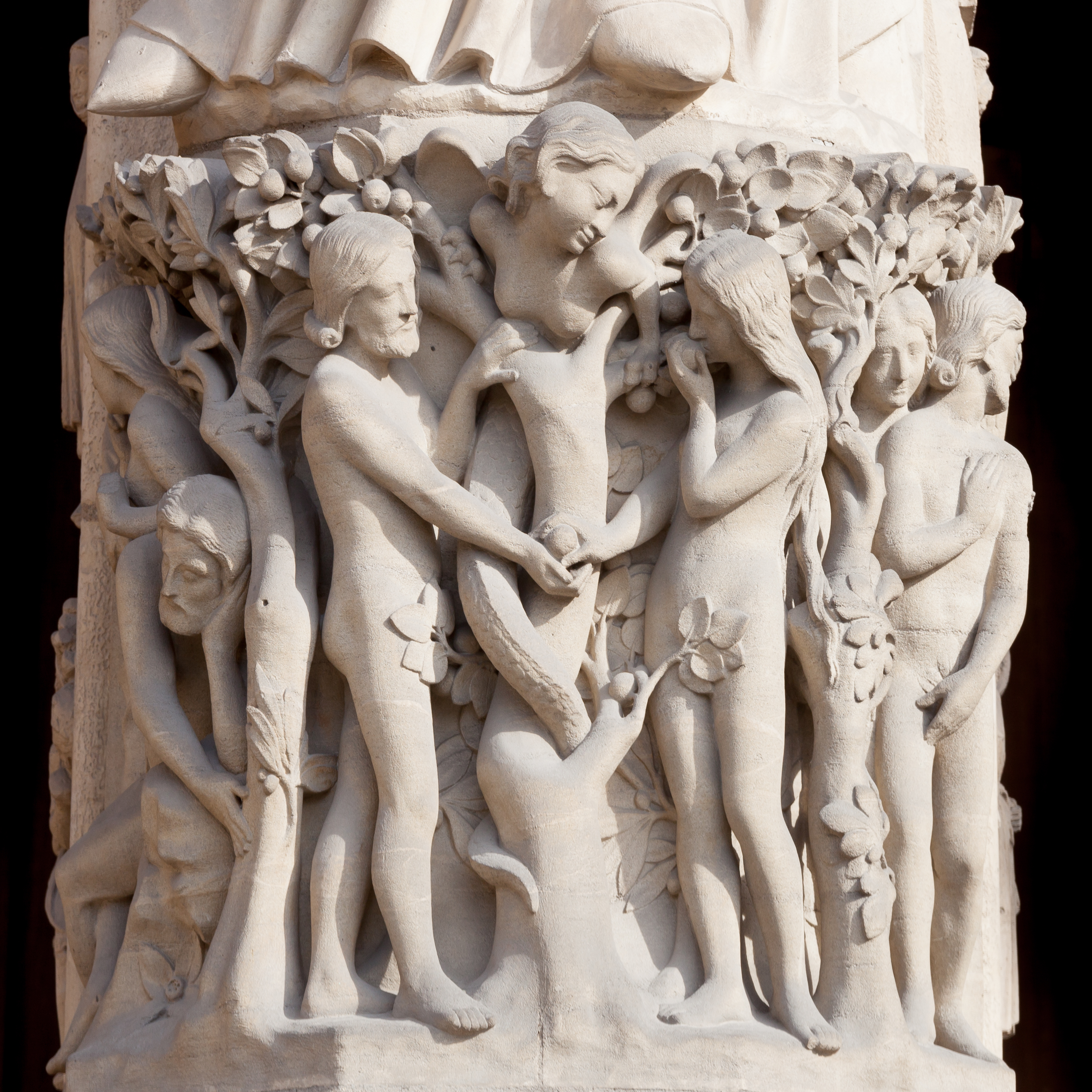
The downfall of Númenor has been compared to the Biblical fall of man. The serpent tempts Adam and Eve to eat the forbidden fruit, Notre Dame de Paris

Tolkien stated that The Downfall of Númenor (Akallabêth) was effectively a second fall of man, with "its central theme .. (inevitably, I think, in a story of Men) a Ban, or Prohibition". Bradley J. Birzer, writing in The J. R. R. Tolkien Encyclopedia, notes that Tolkien thought that every story was essentially about a fall, and accordingly his legendarium contains many "falls": that of Morgoth, of Fëanor and his relatives, and that of Númenor among them. Eric Schweicher, writing in Mythlore, notes that the ban was "soon defied", as in the Biblical fall. The temptation for the Númenoreans was the desire for immortality, and the ban that they broke was not to sail towards the Undying Lands of Aman, parallelling the Biblical prohibition on eating the fruit of the tree of the knowledge of good and evil.

Tolkien mentions also "the 'Fall' of the High-elves" in a letter, giving as the cause "a strange case of an Elf (Míriel mother of Fëanor) that tried to die, which had disastrous results"; he discusses it in the context of the Fall of Man. (Note: Carpenter 2023, Letters #212 to Rhona Beare, unsent draft continuation of #211 of 14 October 1958) Matthew T. Dickerson writes that while Fëanor is held responsible by the Valar, "neither Finwë nor Míriel is blameless".

=== The nature of evil ===
Alternative views of evil in the world, Manichaean, where evil coexists with good, and Boethian, where evil is the absence of good. Both views are hinted at in Tolkien's Middle-earth writings. In addition, the creation of the world as good is Augustinian.

Shippey writes that The Lord of the Rings embodies the ancient debate within Christianity on the nature of evil. Shippey notes Elrond's Boethian statement that "nothing is evil in the beginning. Even [the Dark Lord] Sauron was not so", (Note: Tolkien 1954a, book 2, ch. 2 "The Council of Elrond") in other words all things were created good; but this is set alongside the Manichean view that Good and Evil are equally powerful, and battle it out in the world. Tolkien's personal war experience was Manichean: evil seemed at least as powerful as good, and could easily have been victorious, a strand which Shippey notes can also be seen in Middle-earth. Brian Rosebury, a humanities scholar, interprets Elrond's statement as implying an Augustinian universe, created good.

The Jesuit John L. Treloar writes that the Book of Revelation personifies evil in the Four Horsemen of the Apocalypse: the first, on a white horse, represents a conquering king; the second, red with a sword, means bloody war; the third, black and carrying a scale balance, means famine; and the last, green, is named death. Treloar comments that the personification increases the emotional impact, and that the Ringwraiths (Nazgûl) are introduced "as terror-inspiring horsemen who bring these four evils into the world. They are bent on conquest, war, [and] death, and the land they rule is non-productive."

On The Silmarillion, Shippey writes that the human race seen in Beleriand in the First Age did not "originate 'on stage' in Beleriand, but drifts into it, already sundered in speech, from the East [the main part of Middle-earth]. There something terrible has happened to them of which they will not speak: 'A darkness lies behind us... and we have turned our backs upon it'". He comments that the reader is free to assume the Christian interpretation that the Satanic Morgoth has carried out the Biblical serpent's temptation of Adam and Eve, and that "the incoming Edain and Easterlings are all descendants of Adam flying from Eden and subject to the curse of Babel."

== In other media ==
Christianity Today reported that Oxford University's Bodleian Libraries exhibition "Tolkien: Maker of Middle-earth" was "nearly comprehensive" but had one "glaring omission": "any mention of the author's devout, lifelong Christian faith." It mentions Michael Ward's comment that Tolkien's faith is not obvious in Middle-earth, unlike his friend C. S. Lewis's Narnia, and concludes that "Only if we recognize Tolkien's deep Christian faith can we hope to understand the life and work of the 'Maker of Middle-earth'".
