= Magic in Middle-earth =

Theme in Tolkien's fiction

Magic in Middle-earth is the use of supernatural power in J. R. R. Tolkien's fictional Middle-earth. Tolkien distinguishes ordinary magic from witchcraft, the latter always deceptive, stating that either type could be used for good or evil.

Several of the races of Middle-earth are inherently able to work magic, from the godlike Ainur (including Wizards and Balrogs, both being members of the angelic race of Maiar) and the immortal Elves to Dragons and to some extent also Dwarves. Men and Hobbits could not directly work magic, but could make use of more or less magical artefacts made by others, such as Númenorean swords (made by Men with Elvish blood) and the Phial of Galadriel given to Frodo. Some of the magical artefacts were of great power, including the Palantíri or Stones of Seeing, but by far the most powerful was the One Ring, made by the Dark Lord Sauron and embodying much of his former power.

Scholars have written that Tolkien felt the need for a magical cosmology to counter modernity's war against mystery and magic. In the sense that magic is the use of power to dominate other people, it is evil, and associated in Tolkien's mind with technology. The opposite of that is enchantment, something that Frodo experiences in the Elvish realms of Rivendell and Lothlórien, both preserved by the power of the Three Elvish Rings. That too can be a trap, as the Elves are obliged to let their Rings and their realms fade, just as the Fellowship of the Ring have to let the One Ring go, its addictive power corrupting the wearer's mind to evil.

== Appearances ==
Middle-earth is described both as being quite natural, with the ordinary features of Earth's rivers, mountains and plains, trees and plants under the sky, and supernatural, with magical powers shared by many of its races of beings from Wizards to Dwarves, and a variety of magical artefacts from rings to impenetrable walls.

=== By race ===
The various races of Middle-earth had differing powers:

Powers of Middle-earth races
Race	Description	Examples
Wizards	Maiar, spirit beings sent in Man-like form by the godlike Valar to intervene at need in the affairs of Middle-earth	Saruman, of great power but also able to use deceptive power to create illusions; (Note: Tolkien 1954, book 3, ch. 10 "The Voice of Saruman") Gandalf, able to create fire (Note: Tolkien 1954a, book 2, ch. 3 "The Ring Goes South") or blazing light; (Note: Tolkien 1954, book 3, ch. 5 "The White Rider") use many spells; (Note: Tolkien 1954a, book 2, ch. 4 "A Journey in the Dark") read Frodo's mind and memory (Note: Tolkien 1954a, book 2, ch. 1 "Many Meetings")
Dark Lords	Melkor (Morgoth, a fallen Vala) and Sauron, a fallen Maia (Note: Tolkien 1977, "Ainulindalë") (Note: Carpenter 2023, #156 to Robert Murray, S.J., 4 November 1954)	Sauron greatly increased his power by putting much of his own power into the One Ring (Note: Carpenter 2023, #131 to Milton Waldman, late 1951)
Balrogs	Evil fire-spirits, Maiar corrupted by Morgoth, in a man-shaped body	Durin's Bane started to open a door in Moria closed with a spell by Gandalf. (Note: Tolkien 1954a, book 2, ch. 5 "The Bridge of Khazad-Dum")
Dragons	Descendants of Glaurung, created by Morgoth in the First Age in his war with the Elves (Note: Tolkien 1977, "Of the Return of the Noldor")	Smaug exerts a specific hypnotic power, the dragon-spell (Note: Tolkien 1937, ch. 12 "Inside Information")
Nazgûl (Ringwraiths)	Kings of men trapped by Sauron's gift of Rings of power	Able to use spells of beckoning, location, and fire as weapons; their "Black Breath" spread depression and terror among their enemies. (Note: Tolkien 1977, "Of the Rings of Power and the Third Age") (Note: Tolkien 1955, book 5, ch. 6 "The Battle of the Pelennor Fields")
Elves	Immortal beings with powers from arts and crafts to the clearly magical	Glorfindel and Elrond commanded the river Bruinen to rise and sweep the Nazgûl away, drowning their horses. (Note: Tolkien 1954a, book 1, ch. 12 "Flight to the Ford") Elvish rope was extremely light, strong, and able to untie itself on command. (Note: Tolkien 1989, ch. 13 "Galadriel") (Note: Tolkien 1954, book 4, ch. 1 "The Taming of Sméagol") Elvish waybread, Lembas, was capable of keeping a "traveller on his feet for a day of long labour". (Note: Tolkien 1954a, book 2, ch. 8 "Farewell to Lórien") Elvish cloaks served almost magically as camouflage. (Note: Tolkien 1954, book 3, ch. 2 "The Riders of Rohan") Galadriel's gifts, the Phial of Galadriel and the box of earth she gave to Sam had magical effects.
Dwarves	Mortal beings, but able to set spells on gold and forge magical things	Narvi made the spell-operated Doors of Durin. (Note: Tolkien 1980, part 2, ch. 4 "The History of Galadriel and Celeborn", "Concerning Galadriel and Celeborn")
Men, Hobbits	Mortal beings who in the Third Age were without magical powers; able to use magical things made by the Elves or by the Númenóreans, Men of the Second Age, at least some of whom had some Elvish blood	Use of spell-wrapped swords and the Phial of Galadriel (Note: Tolkien 1954, book 4, ch. 9: "Shelob's Lair") Denethor, Steward of Gondor, examines Pippin's spell-wrapped, rune-decorated sword and asks "Whence came this? ... Many, many years lie on it. Surely this is a blade wrought by our own kindred [Men descended from Númenóreans] in the North in the deep past?" (Note: Tolkien 1955, book 5, ch. 1 "Minas Tirith")
Tom Bombadil (unknown race)	Timeless being in Manlike form; fearless, with powers in his cheerful singing (Note: Tolkien 1954a, book 1, chs. 6–8, "The Old Forest", "In the House of Tom Bombadil", "Fog on the Barrow-downs")	Rescues hobbits from Old Man Willow, and again from the spell of the Barrow-wight, by singing

=== By artefact ===
Magical power is wielded through different artefacts:

Magical artefacts
Artefact	Description	Examples
The One Ring	Extremely powerful, wholly evil; able to corrupt any being of power such as an Elf-lord, King of Men, or Wizard; controlled all other Rings of power; conferred invisibility	Effects on all who come close to the Ring
The Palantíri	Stones of Seeing, made by Elves of Valinor, allow thoughts to be "transferred between wills" (Note: Tolkien 1980, part 4, ch. 3 "The Palantíri") (Note: Tolkien 1954, book 3, ch. 11 "The Palantír")	Saruman is deceived by Sauron through the Orthanc Stone.
Hidden writing	Magical writing, invisible under normal conditions	Moon-letters on Thror's map of Lonely Mountain, telling how to open secret door; (Note: Tolkien 1937, ch. 3 "A Short Rest") similar letters, of Mithril, written around Doors of Durin at western entrance to Moria, made visible by a spell
Indomitable masonry	Stonework embodying power preventing it from being broken by force	Unassailable tower of Orthanc built with wizardry "older and stronger than Saruman's"; (Note: Tolkien 1954, book 3, ch. 8 "The Road to Isengard") "indomitable" Númenórean masonry of outermost wall of Minas Tirith. (Note: Tolkien 1955, book 5, ch. 4 "The Siege of Gondor")
Wizards' staffs	Channelled the Wizards' own power (Note: Tolkien 1980, part 4, ch. 2 "The Istari")	Saruman's staff broken by Gandalf the White at Orthanc; Gandalf's staff broken on Bridge of Khazad-dûm, and he died (Note: Tolkien 1954a, book 2, chapter 5 "The Bridge of Khazad-dûm")
Spell-wrapped weapons	Men of Númenor wielded named swords forged by Elves with power to shine in presence of Orcs, or to break spells protecting the Nazgûl	Narsil (Andúril), Orcrist, and Glamdring; Morgul knife used by Nazgûl on Weathertop; battering-ram Grond had evil spells of destruction written around it.
Magic horn	Ancient horn brought from the North by Eorl the Young, from Scatha the Worm's dragon-hoard, brings joy to friends, fear to enemies	Merry Brandybuck rouses the Shire by blowing the horn-call of Buckland on it (Note: Tolkien 1955, book 6 ch. 8 "The Scouring of the Shire")

== Analysis ==
=== A magical cosmology ===
The scholar and critic Patrick Curry argued that Tolkien felt the need for a magical cosmology combining polytheism and animism with Christian values like compassion and humility, to counter modernity's "war against mystery and magic". He believed that Tolkien considered magic as something negative, associated with modern science and machinery, as in his essay On Fairy-Stories: a means of "power ... [and] domination of things and wills" that corrupts those who use it, for example, trapping the wizard Saruman in his desire for ultimate knowledge and order. Such magic contrasts with the enchantment of Tolkien's fictional elvish lands, which he saw as a form of pure art and an appreciation of the wonders of the world.

=== Two kinds of magic ===
In an unsent draft of a letter in 1954, Tolkien distinguished two kinds of magic with the Greek words μαγεία (mageia "ordinary magic") and γοητεία (goeteia, "witchcraft"). (Note: Carpenter 2023, #155 to Naomi Mitchison (draft, September 1954))

- Mageia involves the use of some mechanism, like speaking the proper words at a magic door, such as the Doors of Durin, to make it open. Sauron used it to create the dark cloud that covered Mordor and Gondor before the Battle of the Pelennor Fields.
- Goeteia influences perception and will. The Elves used it to create artistic beauty without effort and without deception. Sauron used it to dominate the wills of his subjects.

Tolkien stated that these could not be acquired by studying ancient lore or books of spells, but that they were "inherent power not possessed or attainable by Men as such". He however qualified this by writing "But the Númenóreans used 'spells' in making swords?" alongside the end of the letter explaining these points. (Note: Carpenter 2023, footnote 2 to #155 to Naomi Mitchison (draft, September 1954)) He further explained that both Mageia and Goeteia could be used for good and bad purposes, but neither was inherently good or bad in itself. In his view, using them to control free will was the most extreme kind of evil.

=== Enchantment ===
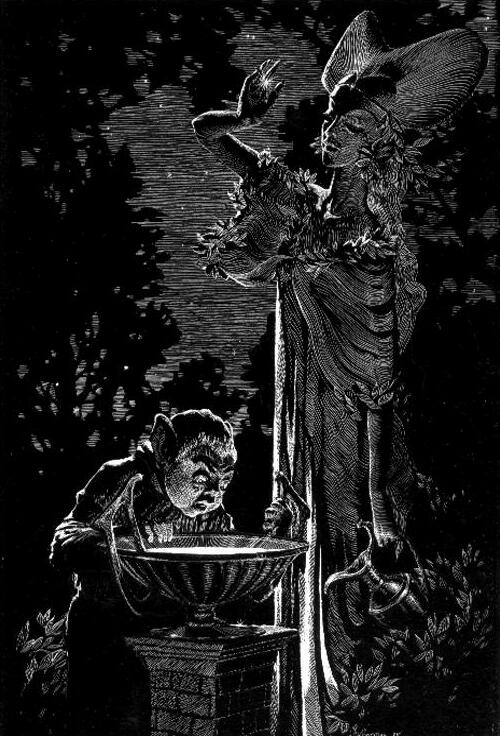
"The magic of Galadriel": (Note: Tolkien 1954a, book 2, ch. 7 "The Mirror of Galadriel". "'And you?' [Galadriel] said, turning to Sam. 'For this is what your folk would call magic, I believe; though I do not understand clearly what they mean; and they seem also to use the same word of the deceits of the Enemy. But this, if you will, is the magic of Galadriel. Did you not say that you wished to see Elf-magic?'") A hobbit looking into the Mirror of Galadriel. Scraperboard illustration by Alexander Korotich, 1981

Curry states that enchantment is "the paradigmatic experience, property and concern of the Elves", as seen both in Rivendell when Frodo listens to the Elves' singing in the Hall of Fire, and even more strongly in Lothlórien:

Frodo stood awhile still lost in wonder. It seemed to him that he had stepped through a high window that looked on a vanished world. A light was upon it for which his language had no name.... He saw no colour but those he knew, gold and white and blue and green, but they were fresh and poignant, as if he had at that moment first perceived them... On the land of Lórien there was no stain. (Note: Tolkien 1954a, book 2, ch. 6 "Lothlórien")

Curry cites what he calls Max Weber's crucial insight, namely that "The unity of the primitive image of the world, in which everything was concrete magic [his italics], has tended to split into rational cognition and mastery of nature, on the one hand, and into 'mystic' experiences, on the other". In his view, enchantment heals the split, seen in Platonic, Christian, and Cartesian philosophy, between subjectivity and objectivity.

In the Tolkien scholar Verlyn Flieger's view, the attractive enchantment of the Elves might then seem entirely perfect; but she argues that this is not so. In her 2001 book A Question of Time, she writes that in Middle-earth, as in human life, any attempt to hold on to enchantment is doomed; the Elves are put to the test of letting Lórien's timeless beauty go, just as the members of the Fellowship of the Ring are put to the test of letting the Ring go. In Curry's view, this explains why the magical power of the three Elvish Rings too must fade when the One Ring is destroyed.

=== Deceptive in use ===
A palantír could not be made to create false images, even by Sauron, but he could use one to selectively display truthful images to create a false impression in the viewer's mind. In each of the four uses of a stone in The Lord of the Rings, a true image is shown, but the viewer draws a false conclusion from the facts. This applies even to Sauron, when he sees Pippin in Saruman's stone and assumes that Pippin has the One Ring, and that Saruman has therefore captured it. Similarly, Denethor is deceived by Sauron, who drives Denethor to suicide by truthfully showing him the Black Fleet approaching Gondor, without telling him that the ships are crewed by Aragorn's men. The Tolkien scholar Tom Shippey suggests that Tolkien's message is that one should not try to double-guess the future through any device, but should trust in providence and make one's own mind up, bravely facing one's duty in each situation.

=== Addiction to power ===
The One Ring offers power to its wearer, and progressively corrupts the wearer's mind to evil; the effect is strongly addictive. Shippey applied Lord Acton's 1887 statement that "Power tends to corrupt, and absolute power corrupts absolutely. Great men are almost always bad men" to it, noting that this was a distinctively modern thought: contemporary authors such as George Orwell with Animal Farm (1945), William Golding with Lord of the Flies (1954), and T. H. White with The Once and Future King (1958) similarly wrote about the corrupting effects of power.

=== Wish-fulfilment ===
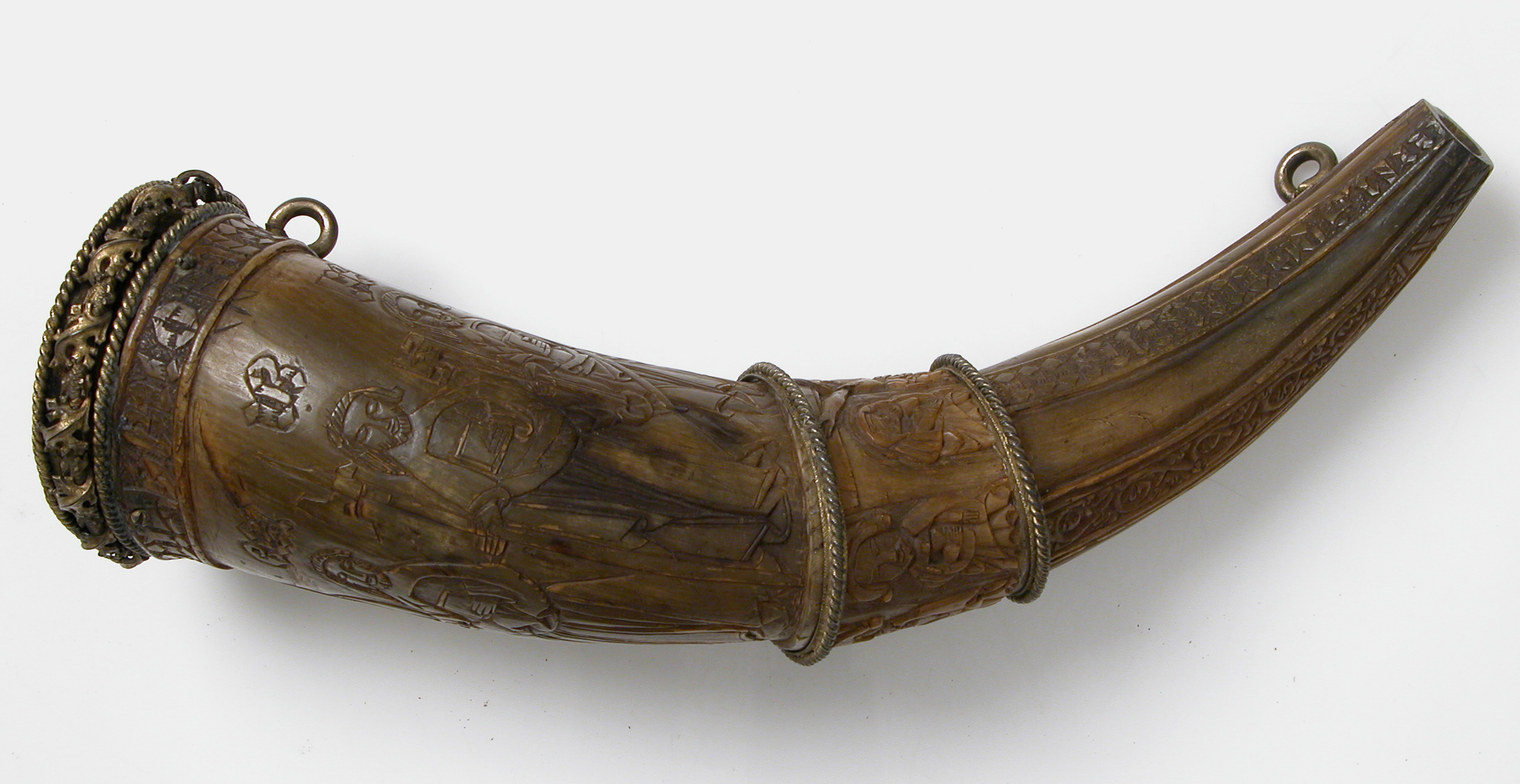
Merry's magic horn brought joy and cleansing to the Shire, something that Tolkien much wished he could bring to England.

Shippey writes that there is a "streak of 'wish-fulfilment'" in the account of "The Scouring of the Shire". Merry returns from Rohan with a magic horn, brought from the North by Eorl the Young, founder of Rohan, from the dragon-hoard of Scatha the Worm. The horn, he explains, is "a magic one, though only modestly so": blowing it brings joy to his friends in arms, fear to his enemies, and it awakens the Hobbits to purify the Shire of Saruman's ruffians. Shippey suggests that Tolkien wished to do the same for England, and notes that with his novels he at least succeeded in bringing joy. The historian Caitlin Vaughn Carlos writes that Sam Gamgee's exclamation "This is worse than Mordor! ... It comes home to you, they say; because it is home, and you remember it before it was ruined" encapsulates the impulse to nostalgia.
