= Sobornost (journal) =

- Discipline: Theology, Ecumenism
- Language: English
- Edited by: Stephen Platt

Publication details
- History: 1935–present
- Publisher: Fellowship of St Alban and St Sergius (United Kingdom)
- Frequency: bi-annual

Standard abbreviations
- ISO 4: Sobornost

Indexing
- ISSN: 0144-8722

Links
- Journal homepage

Sobornost is a theological journal published by the Fellowship of St Alban and St Sergius. It publishes articles on "the life and thought of the Eastern Churches and their relationship with Western Christendom." The journal began in 1935. In 1979, Sobornost incorporated the Eastern Churches Review.

== See also ==
- Sobor
- Sobornost
