= Robert Murray (priest) =

English Jesuit priest (1925–2018)

Robert P. R. Murray SJ
- Born: 8 June 1925; Beijing, China
- Died: 24 May 2018 (aged 92); Boscombe, England
- Occupations: Classicist, Theologian, Syriacist
- Relatives: Grandfather: James Murray, Uncles: H. J. R. Murray, Oswyn Murray

Academic background
- Education: Eltham College, Taunton School
- Alma mater: University of Oxford; Pontifical Gregorian University

Academic work
- Discipline: Syriac studies
- Institutions: Heythrop College, University of London
- Main interests: Classical Syriac
- Notable works: Cosmic Covenant (1992), Symbols of Church and Kingdom (1975)

Robert Patrick Ruthven Murray (1925-2018) was an English Jesuit priest, scripture and patristics scholar and university professor who wrote extensively on Syriac.

== Early life ==
Murray was born to parents who were Congregationalist missionaries in China. His grandfather was James Murray, the noted lexicographer and founding editor of the Oxford English Dictionary. His uncles included H. J. R. Murray and Oswyn Murray. He had his entire education in England. After going to school at Eltham College and Taunton School, he went to study Classics at the University of Oxford. In Oxford, where he met and became friends with J. R. R. Tolkien. While there, he converted to Catholicism. After graduating, he taught at Beaumont College, for one year. It was a school run by the Jesuits. After that year, he decided to join the Jesuits and was ordained at Heythrop College, in Oxfordshire, on 31 July 1959. The next day, at his first Mass, Tolkien was one of the altar servers.

== Academic career ==
After graduating from Heythrop, he went to doctoral studies in Rome at the Pontifical Gregorian University. In 1963, he graduated from Rome and returned to Heythrop to teach Fundamental theology. He would teach at the college on other subjects such as scripture, patristics, ecclesiology and pastoral theology, until his retirement in 1999. During that time he continued his friendship and correspondence with Tolkien. He was one of the proofreaders of The Lord of the Rings. In response to one of Murray's letters, Tolkien wrote that “The Lord of the Rings is of course a fundamentally religious and Catholic work; unconsciously so at first, but consciously in the revision.” Murray could understand Latin, Greek, Hebrew and Aramaic, more than a couple of European languages, but he specialised in Syriac. He wrote two books that utilised his knowledge of theology and numerous languages: Symbols of Church and Kingdom. A Study in Early Syriac Tradition (Cambridge, 1975) and The Cosmic Covenant (London, 1992).

== Bibliography ==
Concerning Syriac studies he wrote many articles including:

- "St Ephrem the Syrian on Church unity," Eastern Churches Quarterly 15 (1963), 164-76.
- "The Rock and the House on the Rock. A chapter in the ecclesiological symbolism of Aphraates and Ephrem," Orientalia Christiana Periodica 30 (1964), 315-62.
- "A special sense of ṣlota as absolution or re-admission to ecclesiastical communion," Orientalia Christiana Periodica 32 (1966), 523-7.
- "Syriac Studies today," Eastern Churches Review 1 (1966/7), 370-73.
- "Reconstructing the Diatessaron," The Heythrop Journal 10 (1969), 43-9.
- "Ephrem Syrus," in J.H. Creehan (ed.) Catholic Dictionary of Theology (London, 1967), II, 220-23.
- "A hymn of St Ephrem to Christ on the Incarnation, the Holy Spirit, and the Sacraments," Eastern Churches Review 3 (1970), 42-50 [with complete translation of de Fide 10].
- "The features of the earliest Christian asceticism," in P. Brooks (ed.), Christian Spirituality. Essays in Honour of E.G. Rupp (London, 1975), 65-77.
- "Mary, the Second Eve in the Early Syriac Fathers," Eastern Churches Review 3 (1971), 372-84.
- "The Lance which re-opened Paradise. A mysterious reading in the early Syriac Fathers," Orientalia Christiana Periodica 39 (1973), 224-34.
- "The exhortation to candidates for ascetical vows at baptism in the ancient Syriac Church," New Testament Studies 21 (1974), 59-80.
- "The theory of symbolism in St Ephrem's theology," Parole de l’Orient 6-7 (1975/6), 1-20 [with complete translation of de Fide 20].
- "Some rhetorical patterns in early Syriac literature," in R.H. Fischer (ed.), A Tribute to Arthur Vööbus (Chicago, 1977), 109-31.
- "Der Dichter als Exeget: der hl. Ephräm und die heutige Exegese," Zeitschrift für katholische Theologie 100 (1978), 484-94.
- "A Hymn of St Ephrem to Christ," Sobornost/Eastern Churches Review 1 (1979), 39-50 [with complete translation of de Virginitate 31].
- "St Ephrem's Dialogue of Reason and Love," Sobornost/Eastern Churches Review 2 (1980), 26-40 [with complete translation of de Ecclesia 9].
- "Syriac Christianity as an example of “inculturation”" [in Chinese], Collectanea Theologica Universitatis Fujen 49 (1981), 453-63.
- "The characteristics of the earliest Syriac Christianity," in N. Garsoian, T. Mathews and R.W. Thomson (eds), East of Byzantium. Syria and Armenia in the Formative Period (Washington DC, 1982), 3-16.
- "Ephraem Syrus," in Theologische Realenzyklopädie IX.5 (1982), 755-62.
- "Hellenistic-Jewish Rhetoric in Aphrahat," in R. Lavenant (ed.), III Symposium Syriacum (Orientalia Christiana Analecta 221; 1983), 87-96.
- "The origins of Aramaic ‘ir Angel," Orientalia 53 1984), 303-17.
- "Ephrem of Syria. A marriage for all eternity: the consecration of a Syrian Bride of Christ," Sobornost/Eastern Churches Review 11 (1989), 65-9.
- "Some themes and problems of early Syriac angelology," in R. Lavenant (ed., V Symposium Syriacum (Orientalia Christiana Analecta 236; 1990), 143-53.
- "Aramaic and Syriac dispute-poems and their connections," in M.J. Geller, J.C. Greenfield and M.P. Weitzman (eds), Studia Aramaica. New Sources and New Approaches (Journal of Semitic Studies Supplement 4; Oxford, 1995), 157-87.
- "L’homme et la creation: responsabilité, péché et reconciliation," in Péché et réconciliation, hier et aujourd’hui (Patrimoine Syriaque IV; Antelias, 1997), 92-9.
- "‘Circumcision of the heart’ and the origins of the Qyama," in G.J. Reinink and A.C. Klugkist (eds), After Bardaisan: Studies on Continuity and Change in Syriac Christianity in Honour of Professor Han J.W. Drijvers (Orientalia Lovaniensia Analecta 89; 1999), 201-11.
- "The Ephremic tradition and the theology of the environment," Hugoye 2:1 (1999), 67-82.
- "The paradox of God's hiddenness and accessibility in St Ephrem," New Blackfriars 996 (2004), 158–62
