= Enya discography =

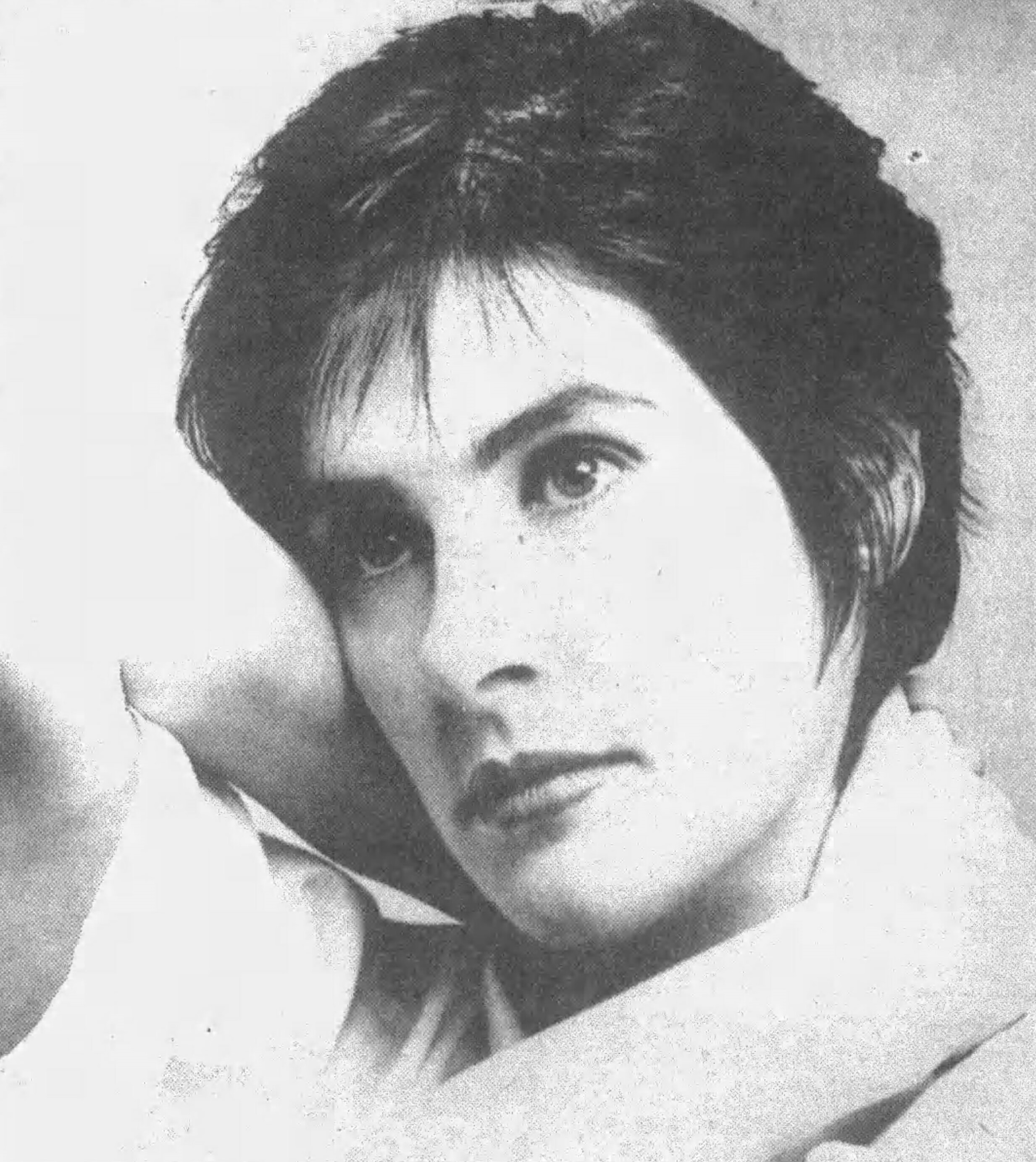
- Enya in 1989
- Studio albums: 8
- Extended plays: 3
- Soundtrack albums: 2
- Compilation albums: 2
- Singles: 21
- Video albums: 3
- Music videos: 39

The discography of Irish singer and composer Enya consists of eight studio albums, two compilation albums, twenty-one singles as lead artist and a number of other appearances. Enya achieved a breakthrough in her career in 1988 with the album Watermark, containing the major hit song "Orinoco Flow" which topped the UK Singles Chart and the European Hot 100 Singles.

Three years later, the similarly successful Shepherd Moons followed, which debuted at the top of the charts in the United Kingdom and featured the moderately successful singles "Caribbean Blue" and "Book of Days", the latter was the theme of the film Far and Away. In 1992, a re-mastered version of the 1987 Enya album was released as The Celts with the title track as a single. Four years after Shepherd Moons, she released The Memory of Trees in 1995, a top five success in several countries around the world, as well as her first top ten album in the United States. Singles released from the album were "Anywhere Is" and "On My Way Home", the first was a top ten hit in the United Kingdom. In November 1997, Enya released her greatest hits collection, Paint the Sky with Stars: The Best of Enya. The compilation was a huge sales success, especially in the United States and Japan, and featured two new songs: the title track and the single "Only If...". The following month, the limited box set A Box of Dreams was additionally released, containing three discs and some B-sides from previous singles.

Following a five-year break, Enya released her most successful studio album to date, A Day Without Rain. The album peaking at number two on the US Billboard 200 albums chart and became the best selling new-age album in history. The first single, "Only Time", was used in the film Sweet November and reached the top ten in the United States and number one in Germany. The second single, "Wild Child", was included as the main theme of the soundtrack of the film Calmi Cuori Appassionati, which was Enya's second album to sell over a million copies in Japan. In 2001, Enya recorded the acclaimed song "May It Be", which featured in the first installment of The Lord of the Rings film series, The Fellowship of the Ring, and was her second consecutive single to enter the German charts at number one. The following year, she released her third box set titled Only Time: The Collection.

Enya was formally credited on two hit singles in 2004, "I Don't Wanna Know" and "You Should Really Know", which contains a sample of "Boadicea" previously used by the group Fugees in the song "Ready or Not". The following year, she released her sixth studio album Amarantine, another top ten success in several countries. The title track became her highest-charting single in France and "It's in the Rain" became her highest-charting single in Italy. The album also marks the first published use of Loxian, a fictional language created by Roma Ryan inspired by the fictional Elvish languages by author J. R. R. Tolkien that she had used for Enya's songs for The Lord of the Rings: The Fellowship of the Ring. In 2006, Enya released the Christmas-themed extended play Sounds of the Season: The Enya Holiday Collection exclusively in the United States in Target stores. It was edited and renamed Christmas Secrets EP for its Canadian release and was included in the Special Christmas Edition of Amarantine. Two years later, And Winter Came... was released, the Christmas- and Winter-themed album was another sizable hit, reaching the top ten in many countries, an unusual accomplishment for a seasonal album. It featured the single "Trains and Winter Rains" and a chorale version of "Oíche Chiúin (Silent Night)". In 2009, Enya released her second compilation The Very Best of Enya, which broke the record for most weeks at number one on the US Billboard New Age Albums, with more than 150 weeks at the top of the chart. Following taking a break from songwriting and recording, she returned to the studio to record Dark Sky Island in 2012 and released it in 2015 accompanied by the single "Echoes in Rain". The album received a mostly positive reception from critics and was a commercial success upon release, within the top ten in sixteen countries worldwide.

Enya has achieved worldwide record sales of more than 80 million, making her one of the best-selling music artists of all time. She has sold over 26.5 million albums in the United States alone according to Nielsen Soundscan, making her one of the best-selling artists in the country. Enya is the artist with most cumulative weeks at number one on the US Billboard New Age Albums, she has won four Grammy Awards and seven World Music Awards.

== Albums ==
=== Studio albums ===
List of studio albums, with selected chart positions, sales figures and certifications
Title	Album details	Peak chart positions											Sales	Certifications
Title	Album details	IRE	AUS	AUT	CAN	GER	NLD	NZ	SWE	SWI	UK	US	Sales	Certifications
Enya (Note: Recorded as the soundtrack album to the documentary TV series The Celts but not promoted as a soundtrack album. A remastered version (with one substituted track) later released as The Celts.)	Released: 9 February 1987; Label: BBC (UK) Atlantic (US); Formats: CD, cassette, LP	—	26	—	—	—	—	15	—	—	69	—	US: 1,110,641 (as of 2008)	ARIA: Platinum; RIAA: Platinum
Enya	Re-released as The Celts: 16 November 1992; Label: WEA (Europe) Reprise (US); Formats: CD, cassette, LP, DCC, digital download, streaming	—	7	—	—	70	28	7	39	—	10	—	US: 1,070,973 (as of 2008)	ARIA: 2× Platinum; BPI: Platinum; BVMI: Gold; RIAA: Platinum; RMNZ: Gold
Watermark	Released: 19 September 1988; Label: WEA (1988, Europe) Geffen (1989, US) Reprise (1991, US); Formats: CD, cassette, LP, DCC, MD, digital download, streaming	—	8	15	8	6	4	1	5	1	5	25	US: 3,877,571 (as of 2008)	ARIA: 6× Platinum; BPI: 4× Platinum; BVMI: Platinum; IFPI SWI: Platinum; MC: 3× Platinum; NVPI: Platinum; RIAA: 4× Platinum; RMNZ: Platinum
Shepherd Moons	Released: 4 November 1991; Label: WEA (Europe) Reprise (US); Formats: CD, cassette, LP, DCC, digital download, streaming	—	8	31	7	21	7	3	5	13	1	17	US: 4,674,997 (as of 2008)	IRMA: Platinum; ARIA: 3× Platinum; BPI: 4× Platinum; BVMI: Gold; IFPI SWI: Gold; MC: 3× Platinum; NVPI: 2× Platinum; RIAA: 5× Platinum; RMNZ: Platinum
The Memory of Trees	Released: 20 November 1995; Label: WEA (Europe) Reprise (US); Formats: CD, cassette, digital download, streaming, LP	—	1	3	4	4	1	3	1	3	5	9	US: 2,397,724 (as of 2008)	ARIA: 4× Platinum; BPI: 2× Platinum; BVMI: Gold; GLF: Platinum; IFPI AUT: Platinum; MC: Platinum; NVPI: Platinum; RIAA: 3× Platinum; RMNZ: Platinum
A Day Without Rain	Released: 20 November 2000; Label: WEA (Europe) Reprise (US); Formats: CD, cassette, MD, digital download, streaming, LP	7	4	1	4	1	2	5	4	2	6	2	US: 6,904,025 (as of 2008)	ARIA: 3× Platinum; BPI: 2× Platinum; BVMI: 3× Platinum; GLF: Platinum; IFPI AUT: Platinum; IFPI SWI: 2× Platinum; MC: 8× Platinum; NVPI: 3× Platinum; RIAA: 7× Platinum; RMNZ: Platinum
Amarantine	Released: 21 November 2005; Label: Warner (Europe) Reprise (US); Formats: CD, digital download, streaming, LP	15	13	4	4	3	5	10	4	3	8	6	US: 1,344,593 (as of 2008)	IRMA: Platinum; ARIA: Platinum; BPI: Platinum; BVMI: 2× Platinum; GLF: Gold; IFPI SWI: 2× Platinum; NVPI: Platinum; RIAA: Platinum; RMNZ: Platinum
And Winter Came...	Released: 7 November 2008; Label: Warner (Europe) Reprise (US); Formats: CD, digital download, streaming, LP	13	7	6	4	3	2	9	4	3	6	8	US: 920,000 (as of 2015)	IRMA: Platinum; ARIA: Platinum; BPI: Gold; BVMI: 3× Gold; GLF: Gold; IFPI AUT: Gold; IFPI SWI: Platinum; NVPI: Platinum; RIAA: Gold; RMNZ: Platinum
Dark Sky Island	Released: 20 November 2015; Label: Warner (worldwide); Formats: CD, digital download, streaming, LP	7	8	6	6	3	5	8	22	2	4	8		ARIA: Gold; BPI: Gold; BVMI: Gold; GLF: Gold; IFPI SWI: Gold; MC: Gold; RMNZ: Gold

=== Compilation albums ===
List of compilation albums, with selected chart positions, sales figures and certifications
Title	Album details	Peak chart positions											Sales	Certifications
Title	Album details	IRE	AUS	AUT	CAN	GER	NLD	NZ	SWE	SWI	UK	US	Sales	Certifications
Paint the Sky with Stars: The Best of Enya	Released: 3 November 1997; Label: WEA (Europe) Reprise (US); Formats: CD, cassette, digital download, streaming	48	10	3	33	5	10	6	1	7	4	30	US: 3,456,664 (as of 2008)	ARIA: 3× Platinum; BPI: 2× Platinum; BVMI: Platinum; GLF: 2× Platinum; IFPI AUT: Platinum; IFPI SWI: Platinum; NVPI: Gold; RIAA: 4× Platinum; RMNZ: Platinum
The Very Best of Enya	Release: 23 November 2009; Label: Warner Bros. (Europe) Reprise (US); Formats: CD, digital download, streaming, LP	22	19	18	23	19	11	6	20	8	32	55		IRMA: Gold; ARIA: Gold; BPI: Platinum; BVMI: Gold; RMNZ: Platinum

=== Soundtrack albums ===
List of soundtrack albums, with selected chart positions and certifications
Title	Album details	Peak chart positions	Certifications
Title	Album details	JPN	Certifications
The Frog Prince (Note: Enya performs on two tracks and composed music performed by others.)	Released: 21 October 1985; Label: Island Visual Arts; Formats: LP, CD	—	
Themes from Calmi Cuori Appassionati (Note: A compilation of previously released tracks recorded between 1985 and 2000 that were used in the movie.)	Released: 30 October 2001 (JPN); Label: WEA; Formats: CD, digital download, streaming	2	RIAJ: Million
"—" denotes a recording that did not chart or was not released in that territory.

=== Box sets ===
List of box sets with selected chart positions
Title	Album details	Peak chart positions		
Title	Album details	AUS	GER	NLD
The Enya Collection	Released: 30 November 1996 (JPN); Label: WEA; Formats: CD	—	—	—
A Box of Dreams	Released: 1 December 1997; Label: WEA; Formats: CD, digital download, streaming, LP	199	—	—
Only Time: The Collection	Released: 5 November 2002; Label: WEA (Europe) Reprise (US); Formats: CD	—	93	37
"—" denotes a recording that did not chart or was not released in that territory.

=== Video albums ===
List of video albums
Title	Album details
Moonshadows	Released: 1991; Label: Warner Music Vision (Europe) Warner Reprise Video (US); Formats: VHS, VCD, Laserdisc
The Video Collection	Released: 2001; Label: Warner Music Vision, WEA; Formats: DVD, VHS
The Very Best of Enya	Released: 23 November 2009; Label: Warner Bros.; Formats: CD + DVD

== Extended plays ==
=== Studio ===
List of studio extended plays with sales figures
Title	EP details	Sales
Sounds of the Season: The Enya Collection	Released: 10 October 2006 (US); Label: Rhino Custom Products, NBCUniversal; Formats: CD, digital download	US: 214,626 (as of 2008)
Sounds of the Season: The Enya Collection	Re-released in Canada as Christmas Secrets: 28 November 2006; Label: Warner Bros.; Formats: CD, digital download	

=== Compilation ===
List of compilation extended plays
Title	EP details
6 Tracks	Released: 25 May 1989 (JPN); Label: WEA; Formats: CD
The Christmas EP	Released: 4 November 1994 (CAN); Label: WEA; Formats: CD, cassette

== Singles ==
=== As lead artist ===
List of singles as lead artist, with selected chart positions and certifications, showing year released and album name
Title	Year	Peak chart positions											Certifications	Album
Title	Year	IRE	AUS	AUT	FRA	GER	ITA	NLD	SWE	SWI	UK	US	Certifications	Album
"I Want Tomorrow"	1987	—	100	—	—	—	—	—	—	—	—	—		Enya
"Orinoco Flow"	1988	1	6	8	16	2	—	1	2	1	1	24	BPI: Gold	Watermark
"Evening Falls..."	1988	3	104	—	—	—	—	32	—	—	20	—		Watermark
"Storms in Africa"	1989	12	—	—	—	—	—	—	—	—	41	—		Watermark
"Oíche Chiúin (Silent Night)"	1989	—	48	—	—	—	—	—	—	—	—	— (Note: "Oíche Chiúin (Silent Night)" did not enter the Billboard Hot 100, but peaked at number 17 on the Bubbling Under Hot 100 Singles chart.)		6 Tracks / The Christmas EP
"Exile"	1991	—	—	—	—	—	—	—	—	—	79	—		Watermark
"Caribbean Blue"	1991	8	74	—	—	50	—	37	28	32	13	79	BPI: Gold	Shepherd Moons
"How Can I Keep from Singing?"	1991	19	47	—	—	—	—	—	29	—	32	—		Shepherd Moons
"Book of Days"	1992	12	111	—	—	—	—	—	34	—	10	—		Shepherd Moons
"The Celts"	1992	—	97	—	—	—	—	—	—	—	29	—		The Celts
"Marble Halls"	1994	—	—	—	—	—	—	—	—	—	—	—		Shepherd Moons
"Anywhere Is"	1995	8	34	8	—	44	—	19	33	—	7	—	BPI: Silver	The Memory of Trees
"On My Way Home"	1996	—	151	—	—	—	22	—	—	—	26	—		The Memory of Trees
"Only If..."	1997	—	94	—	—	68	—	78	—	—	43	88		Paint the Sky with Stars
"Only Time"	2000	—	69	2	51	1	17	44	30	1	32	10	BPI: Gold; BVMI: 3× Gold; FIMI: Gold; IFPI AUT: Gold; IFPI SWI: Gold	A Day Without Rain
"Wild Child"	2001	—	—	—	—	—	—	—	—	—	72	— (Note: "Wild Child" did not enter the US Billboard Hot 100 but peaked at number 12 on the Billboard Adult Contemporary chart.)		A Day Without Rain
"May It Be"	2001	30	—	12	43	1	12	60	16	24	50	—	BPI: Silver	The Lord of the Rings: The Fellowship of the Ring
"Amarantine"	2005	50	—	31	15	47	—	—	—	39	53	— (Note: "Amarantine" did not enter the US Billboard Hot 100 but peaked at number 12 on the Billboard Adult Contemporary chart.)		Amarantine
"It's in the Rain"	2006	—	—	—	—	—	7	—	—	—	195	—		Amarantine
"Trains and Winter Rains"	2008	—	—	—	—	—	15	—	—	—	—	— (Note: "Trains and Winter Rains" did not enter the US Billboard Hot 100 but peaked at number 27 on the Billboard Adult Contemporary chart.)		And Winter Came...
"Echoes in Rain"	2015	—	—	—	—	—	—	—	—	—	—	—		Dark Sky Island
"—" denotes a recording that did not chart or was not released in that territory.

=== As featured artist ===
List of singles as featured artist, with selected chart positions and certifications, showing year released and album name
Title	Year	Peak chart positions											Certifications	Album
Title	Year	IRE	AUS	AUT	FRA	GER	ITA	NLD	SWE	SWI	UK	US	Certifications	Album
"Ready Or Not" (Fugees featuring Enya)	1996	2	24	17	—	8	—	3	3	23	1	— (Note: "Ready Or Not" did not enter the US Billboard Hot 100 but peaked at number 22 on the Billboard R&B/Hip-Hop Airplay chart.)		The Score
"I Don't Wanna Know" (Mario Winans featuring Enya and P. Diddy)	2004	2	2	6	4	1	5	2	11	2	1	2	ARIA: Platinum; BPI: Gold; RIAA: Gold	Hurt No More
"You Should Really Know" (The Pirates featuring Shola Ama, Naila Boss, Ishani and Enya)	2004	25	—	41	49	—	—	—	—	—	8	—		Non-album singles
"Dive" (Salvatore Ganacci featuring Enya and Alex Aris)	2016	—	—	—	—	—	—	—	—	—	—	— (Note: "Dive" did not enter the US Billboard Hot 100, but peaked at number 14 on the Billboard Dance/Electronic Digital Songs Sales chart.)		Non-album singles
"—" denotes a recording that did not chart or was not released in that territory.

=== Promotional singles ===
List of promotional singles showing year released and album name
Title	Year	Peak chart positions	Album
Title	Year	US AC	Album
"China Roses"	1995	—	The Memory of Trees
"If I Could Be Where You Are"	2005	—	Amarantine
"Someone Said Goodbye"	2006	29	Amarantine
"The Magic of the Night"	2006	—	Amarantine: Special Christmas Edition
"White Is in the Winter Night"	2008	8	And Winter Came...
"My! My! Time Flies!"	2009	—	And Winter Came...
"Dreams Are More Precious"	2009	—	And Winter Came...
"So I Could Find My Way"	2015	—	Dark Sky Island
"The Humming"	2015	—	Dark Sky Island
"Even in the Shadows"	2016	—	Dark Sky Island
"—" denotes a recording that did not chart or was not released in that territory.

== Other charted and certified songs ==
List of songs, with selected chart positions, showing year released and album name
Title	Year	Peak chart positions		Certifications	Album
Title	Year	SWI	US Bub.	Certifications	Album
"Watermark"	1988	—	—	BPI: Silver	Watermark
"O Come, O Come, Emmanuel"	2008	—	9		And Winter Came...
"And Winter Came..."	2008	51	—		And Winter Came...
"—" denotes a recording that did not chart.

== Music videos ==
=== Official videos ===
List of videos, showing year released and director
Title	Year	Director
"I Want Tomorrow"	1987	David Richardson
"Aldebaran"	1987	David Richardson
"Boadicea"	1987	Entertainment Production
"Orinoco Flow"	1988	Michael Geoghegan
"Evening Falls..."	1988	Michael Geoghegan
"Storms in Africa"	1989	Michael Geoghegan
"On Your Shore"	1989	Entertainment Production
"Na Laetha Geal M'óige"	1989	Entertainment Production
"Exile"	1991	Michael Geoghegan
"Caribbean Blue"	1991	Michael Geoghegan
"Shepherd Moons"	1991	Unnamed
"How Can I Keep from Singing?"	1991	Entertainment Production
"Marble Halls"	1992	Entertainment Production
"Book of Days"	1992	Michael Geoghegan
"The Celts"	1992	Michael Geoghegan
"Anywhere Is"	1995	David Scheinmann
"On My Way Home"	1996	Rob Dickins
"Oíche Chiúin (Silent Night)"	1996	Entertainment Production
"Only If..."	1997	Dan Nathan
"Only Time"	2000	Graham Fink
"Wild Child"	2001	Graham Fink
"May It Be"	2002	Peter Nydrle
"Amarantine"	2005	Tim Royes
"It's in the Rain"	2006	Tim Royes
"Trains and Winter Rains"	2008	Rob O'Connor
"So I Could Find My Way"	2015	Ku Nakagawa
"Echoes in Rain"	2015	Ku Nakagawa
"Watermark"	2021	Unnamed

=== Lyric videos ===
List of lyric videos showing year released
Title	Year	Director
"Echoes in Rain"	2015	Unnamed
"So I Could Find My Way"	2015	Unnamed
"The Humming"	2015	Unnamed
"Even in the Shadows"	2016	Unnamed
"May It Be"	2020	Unnamed
"O Come, O Come, Emmanuel"	2020	Unnamed
"Oíche Chiúin (Chorale)"	2020	Unnamed
"We Wish You a Merry Christmas"	2020	Unnamed
"Journey of the Angels"	2020	Unnamed
"White Is in the Winter Night"	2020	Unnamed
"Dreams Are More Precious"	2020	Unnamed
