= Echoes in Rain =

Single by Enya

from the album Dark Sky Island
- Released: 9 October 2015
- Recorded: 2012–2015
- Studio: Aigle Studio, Treesdale, Ireland
- Length: 3:35
- Label: Warner Bros.
- Songwriters: Enya; Roma Ryan
- Producer: Nicky Ryan

Enya singles chronology
"Trains and Winter Rains" (2008)	"Echoes in Rain" (2015)

Music video
- "Echoes In Rain" on YouTube

"Echoes in Rain" is a single by Irish singer and composer Enya, the song is the lead single and final recording on her eighth studio album Dark Sky Island (2015), the song was released on 9 October 2015 through the record label Warner Bros. Records.

== Composition and lyrics ==
The song was the final track to be worked on for the Dark Sky Island album, as was the case with the song Orinoco Flow from her 1988 album Watermark. Enya states that Echoes is Rain is a continuation of the latter song and represents the journey home.

"Echoes in Rain" has a 'buoyant optimism' due to the 'marching' rhythmic ostinatos and pizzicato strings. The a cappella multi-vocal ending was compared to Enya's breakthrough single "Orinoco Flow". "Echoes in Rain" is played in a minor scale (explicitly F-sharp minor). Enya's vocals span 2 octaves from the low note of B2 to the high note of E5. The song includes a piano-based bridge, similar to Enya's piano solo work, and it is the first of her lead singles to do so.

The lyrics describe the feelings of a long journey home, travelling through night and through day, with the verses detailing how the surroundings and emotions change throughout the journey.

The lyric 'everything flows' is repeated throughout, perhaps referring to "Orinoco Flow". Enya has a few other songs with similar references to the hit song. In The Memory of Trees the song "On My Way Home" repeats the 'turn it up, adieu' lyric; "Lazy Days" has the lyric 'and how it sails away' in A Day Without Rain, and in And Winter Came... "Miraculum" has Latin lyrics, in which the refrain translates to 'to sail away, a wonderful thing'.

'Here comes another new day' precedes the chorus in "Echoes In Rain", which uses the phrase 'alleluia' to express the joyous feeling that each 'new day' brings and the happiness of returning back home.

== Live performances ==
On 13 December 2015, Enya gave a surprise performance of the song at the Universal Studios Japan Christmas Show. In March 2016, she performed the song on Live! with Kelly and Michael and on April 7, 2016 at the 2016 ECHO Award.

== Music video ==
The music video for "Echoes in Rain" was released on 20 November 2015, the same day as the accompanying album Dark Sky Island. It was directed by Japanese director Ku Nakagawa, and showed Enya performing the song with the female string ensemble - Wired Strings, and a female choir, in Harrow School in London. The set featured an antique rotating globe, turning as the 'long journey home' the lyrics describe progressed and changed from night to day and back; to emphasise, intense lighting lit the church to represent the day (white, bright lights), and the night (blue, dim lights) of the journey.

== Track listing ==
Single

1. "Echoes in Rain" – 3:35

Promo

1. "Echoes in Rain" (Radio Edit) – 2:58

== Charts ==
Chart (2016)	Peak position
Belgium (Ultratip Bubbling Under Flanders)	6
Belgium (Ultratop 50 Wallonia)	48

== Release history ==
Region	Date	Format(s)	Label	Ref.
Worldwide	October 9, 2015	Digital download	Aigle Music; Warner Music	
Italy	November 13, 2015	Contemporary hit radio	Aigle Music; Warner Music	
