= Trains and Winter Rains =

Single by Enya

from the album And Winter Came...
- Released: 10 November 2008
- Genre: New-age
- Length: 3:44 (album version); 3:25 (radio edit)
- Label: Warner Bros.
- Songwriter(s): Enya: Roma Ryan
- Producer(s): Nicky Ryan

Enya singles chronology
"It's in the Rain" (2006)	"Trains and Winter Rains" (2008)	"Echoes in Rain" (2015)

Audio sample
- file; help

Music video
- "Trains and Winter Rains" on YouTube

"Trains and Winter Rains" is a single by Irish musician Enya, the first to be released from her 2008 studio album And Winter Came.... It premiered on the BBC Radio 2 show Wake up to Wogan on 29 September 2008.

== Music video ==
The music video was directed by Rob O'Connor, and first became available on Enya's official website on 22 October 2008. As well as Enya surrounded by neon light screens and her looking at the city night through a window as a passenger on the train, a few passengers are shown, waiting and moving around a quiet train station. There are a few shots of the New York skyline. The main filming location is London, specifically Canary Wharf and Heron Quays.

== Charts ==
Chart (2008)	Peak position
Belgium (Ultratip Bubbling Under Flanders)	15
Belgium (Ultratop 50 Wallonia)	39
Italy (FIMI)	15
US Adult Contemporary (Billboard)	27
