= Amarantine (song) =

2005 single by Enya

Single by Enya

from the album Amarantine
- B-side: "The Comb of the Winds"; "The Spaghetti Theme from The Celts"
- Released: 5 December 2005
- Genre: New-age
- Length: 3:10
- Label: Reprise
- Songwriters: Enya; Roma Ryan
- Producer: Nicky Ryan

Enya singles chronology
"You Should Really Know" (2004)	"Amarantine" (2005)	"It's in the Rain" (2006)

Music video
- "Amarantine" on YouTube

"Amarantine" is a single by Irish musician Enya, taken from the album of the same name. The word is taken from ancient Greek and means everlasting or immortal (the same as the amaranth flower). The single was released in the United Kingdom on 5 December 2005.

Several versions of "Amarantine" were released, some containing all three tracks, and some omitting the "Spaghetti Western" track. In some areas, Reprise released both a "Part I" single containing "Amarantine" and "The Comb of the Winds" and a "Part II" single that contained all three tracks.

The "Spaghetti Western Theme" is an atypical Enya recording arranged in the style of Ennio Morricone's work on films such as A Fistful of Dollars and The Good, the Bad and the Ugly. A previously unreleased recording from The Celts soundtrack from 1986, Enya released it in memory of BBC producer Tony McAuley. Enya performed the song on Live! with Regis and Kelly and The Early Show.

== Track listing ==
No.	Title	Length
1.	"Amarantine (single version)"	3:07
2.	"The Comb of the Winds"	3:39
3.	"The Spaghetti Western Theme from The Celts"	1:57

French CD single

1. "Amarantine" (album version)
2. "Boadicea" (single version)
3. "Orinoco Flow"

== Music video ==
The music video for "Amarantine" was directed by Tim Royes who worked alongside well-known UK post-production and special effects company Rushes. The surreal forest through which Enya walks was created by digital matte painter Charles Darby (The Fifth Element, Titanic, The Matrix).

== Charts ==
Chart (2005)	Peak position
Austrian Singles Chart	28
French Singles Chart	15
German Singles Chart	47
Irish Singles Chart	48
Italian Singles Chart	42
Japan Oricon Weekly Singles Chart	71
Swiss Singles Chart	36
UK Singles Chart	53
U.S. Billboard Hot Adult Contemporary Tracks	12
U.S. Billboard Hot Single Sales	10
