= And Winter Came... =

Studio album by Enya
- Released: 7 November 2008
- Recorded: 2006–2008
- Studios: Aigle Studio, Killiney, County Dublin
- Genres: New-age; Celtic; Christmas
- Length: 45:03
- Labels: Warner Bros. (EU); Reprise (US)
- Producer: Nicky Ryan

Enya chronology
Sounds of the Season: The Enya Collection (2006)	And Winter Came... (2008)	The Very Best of Enya (2009)

Singles from And Winter Came
- 1. "Trains and Winter Rains" Released: 10 November 2008

And Winter Came... is the seventh studio album by Irish singer and composer Enya, released on 7 November 2008 by Warner Bros. Records internationally and by Reprise Records in the United States on 11 November 2008. After recording new Christmas songs for her fourth EP Sounds of the Season: The Enya Collection (2006), Enya started work on a Christmas album of traditional carols and original tracks, but the idea was changed to a collection of songs with a Christmas or winter theme as it better suited the style of the new material. It was recorded with her longtime collaborators, arranger and producer Nicky Ryan and his wife, lyricist Roma Ryan.

The album received mixed to positive reviews from music critics and became a worldwide success, reaching the top 10 in 21 countries in its first three weeks, including No. 8 on the US Billboard 200 and No. 6 on the UK Albums Chart. The track "Trains and Winter Rains" was the album's only physical single, and was followed by "Dreams Are More Precious", "White Is in the Winter Night", and "My! My! Time Flies!", released as digital downloads. To promote the album, Enya made several interviews, appearances, and live performances. The album has sold over 3 million copies worldwide.

== Background and recording ==
In November 2006, after her promotional tour for her previous studio album Amarantine (2005), Enya put out her fourth EP entitled Sounds of the Season: The Enya Collection, a Christmas-themed release containing new and previously released songs from the special Christmas edition of Amarantine, also released in the same month. For her next studio album Enya decided to record an album of Christmas music, a project that she had wanted to do for some time. She was inspired by the idea as winter is her favourite time of year, calling it "very reflective [...] very calming", during which she spends the most time developing sketches of music that she had put down throughout the year. Initially, Enya approached the project with the idea of combining tracks from the Sounds of the Season EP with some new material, but this was scrapped when an album of songs of a Christmas or winter theme was more attractive as the new music that Enya had developed suited it better. Nicky Ryan added that the album developed into one "based in a winter landscape where Christmas arrives here and there, but it would be wrong to call it an Enya Christmas album."

The album was recorded between 2006 and 2008 with Enya and her longtime collaborators, arranger and producer Nicky Ryan and his wife, lyricist Roma Ryan. It features ten original tracks with lyrics sung in English. As with her previous albums recording took place at Aigle Studio, the Ryans' home studio in Killiney, County Dublin.

== Music and lyrics ==
"And Winter Came..." is an instrumental and a rearranged version of "Midnight Blue", the B-side to "Wild Child", the second single from A Day Without Rain (2000). The majority of Enya's albums begin with a same-titled instrumental and she selected the title track as the opener because its themes "sets the mood of autumn going into winter". "Journey of the Angels" was written in the style of what Enya described as a "slow traditional carol", with Roma emphasising its religious aspect, and chose it as a personal highlight of the album. The song is dedicated to the American director and editor Tim Royes, who produced the music videos for Enya's songs "Amarantine" and "It's in the Rain" and died in 2007. For "White Is in the Winter Night", Enya was inspired by the idea of writing a "21st century Christmas carol", and pointed out Roma's lyrics that describe the various colours associated with Christmas time: "Green is in the mistletoe and red is in the holly ... Gold is in the candlelight and crimson in the embers". The album contains two traditional songs that were rearranged by Enya and Nicky; "O Come, O Come, Emmanuel" is an Advent Christian hymn that was introduced to Enya during her time in the choir at boarding school and became a longtime favourite of hers and Roma's, which inspired the decision to record it for the album. The song is sung in Latin. Enya described the meaning behind "Trains and Winter Rains": "The song ...] is like a dark winter journey and I think everybody has taken this journey where it's time to leave home. It's exciting but because it is the unknown, that's why we wanted to capture the little dark aspects in both the lyric and in the music." Roma compared "Dreams Are More Precious" to a "Christmas lullaby" and revealed its title was derived from the lyric that she wrote for the song.

"Last Time by Moonlight" is a romantic song that developed around the idea of two people who once loved each other having since split, and the reflection on one's life that could happen around Christmas time. Enya and Roma developed "One Toy Soldier" into a children's song about an old toy soldier with a broken drum that is a family's heirloom; despite its age it is still loved. Roma's initial set of lyrics had the story end with the toy soldier's future unclear on Christmas morning, but she knew Enya would not settle on such an ending, so she changed them accordingly to show the toy soldier was fine. "My! My! Time Flies!" was the last track recorded for the album. It is an uptempo song dedicated to the Irish guitarist Jimmy Faulkner, who died in March 2008. Its lyrics were based around a conversation that Enya and the Ryans had about Faulkner on a day surrounding his death and his favourite music. The track marks a departure from Enya's musical style in that it is her first song to use a steady drum track and her second song ever to include a prominent guitar solo, performed here by Pat Farrell (previously married to her sister, Moya Brennan), the first being "I Want Tomorrow" on Enya's first studio album from 1987. "Oíche Chiúin (Silent Night) (Chorale)" is the album's second traditional song, and is Enya's first since A Day Without Rain that is sung in Irish, her first language. It is the Irish version of the Christmas carol "Silent Night", a favourite of Enya's since she first learned it as a child and sang with her school choir. Enya had previously recorded a version of the carol as a B-side to "Evening Falls...", the second single released from Watermark (1988). The decision to record a new version came from Nicky, who suggested more of a chorale arrangement and saw the track as a good opportunity to present Enya's voice as a choir, a wish of his since working with Enya. Roma added: "His little wish has come true. He has finally gotten Enya to sing it exactly the way he had envisioned it".

== Release and reception ==
Professional ratings
Review scores
Source	Rating
About.com	3.5/5 stars
AllMusic	3/5 stars
The Times	3/5 stars

An album launch party was held on 8 October 2008 at Two Temple Place in Temple, London, which was decorated for the occasion in the theme of the album. This was followed by a press conference given by Enya the next day at The Dorchester hotel. A second launch party was held on 3 November 2008 at the Great Orangery at Charlottenburg Palace in Berlin and featured dancers of the Berlin State Ballet performing choreography set to Enya songs.

And Winter Came... was released on 7 November 2008 by Warner Bros. Records internationally; its release in the United States was on 11 November 2008 by Reprise Records. The album debuted at number 6 on the UK Albums Chart, selling 35,812 copies in its first week. On 28 November 2008, the album was certified gold by the British Phonographic Industry (BPI) for 100,000 copies sold. The album also peaked at number 6 on the Billboard 200, with first-week sales of 92,000 copies. In its second week, the album sold 83,000 copies. It continued to sell, and received a gold certification from the Recording Industry Association of America on 12 December 2008 for sales in excess of 500,000 copies in the United States. By October 2015, this number had grown to 920,000. Elsewhere, the album reached the top 20 in 21 countries in its first three weeks. By late 2011, over three million copies of the album had been sold worldwide.

Enya released "Trains and Winter Rains" as the album's only physical single, in 10 November 2008. This was followed by the release of three album tracks for digital download: "White Is in the Winter Night" on 4 November 2008, "My! My! Time Flies!" on 4 February 2009, and "Dreams Are More Precious" on 10 October 2009.

The album was released on vinyl for the first time on 20 October 2017, in the United States.

== Track listing ==
All music composed by Enya; all lyrics by Roma Ryan; all songs produced by Nicky Ryan (except music and lyrics to "O Come, O Come, Emmanuel" and "Oíche Chiúin (Silent Night) (Chorale)" are traditional, arr. Enya and Nicky Ryan).

And Winter Came... – Standard edition
No.	Title	Length
1.	"And Winter Came..."	3:15
2.	"Journey of the Angels"	4:47
3.	"White Is in the Winter Night"	3:00
4.	"O Come, O Come, Emmanuel"	3:40
5.	"Trains and Winter Rains"	3:43
6.	"Dreams Are More Precious"	4:25
7.	"Last Time by Moonlight"	3:57
8.	"One Toy Soldier"	3:54
9.	"Stars and Midnight Blue"	3:08
10.	"The Spirit of Christmas Past"	4:18
11.	"My! My! Time Flies!"	3:02
12.	"Oíche Chiúin (Silent Night) (Chorale)"	3:49
Total length:		45:03

And Winter Came... – Amazon Exclusive edition (bonus track)
No.	Title	Length
13.	"Miraculum"	3:53
Total length:		48:56

== Personnel ==
Credits are adapted from the album's 2008 liner notes.

Musicians

- Enya – vocals, instrumentation
- Pat Farrell – lead guitar, 12-string guitar on "My! My! Time Flies!"

Production

- Enya – arranging
- Nicky Ryan – arranging, engineering, mixing
- Roma Ryan – lyrics
- Tom Whalley – executive producer
- Dick Beetham – mastering at Mastering 360, London
- Daniel Polley – digital technical advisor
- Simon Fowler – photography
- Stylorouge – design, art direction

== Charts ==
=== Weekly charts ===
Weekly chart performance for And Winter Came...
Chart (2008–09)	Peak position
Australian Albums (ARIA)	7
Austrian Albums (Ö3 Austria)	6
Belgian Albums (Ultratop Flanders)	1
Belgian Albums (Ultratop Wallonia)	2
Canadian Albums (Billboard)	4
Croatian International Albums (HDU)	20
Czech Albums (ČNS IFPI)	2
Danish Albums (Hitlisten)	9
Dutch Albums (Album Top 100)	2
European Albums (European Top 100 Albums)	2
Finnish Albums (Suomen virallinen lista)	21
French Albums (SNEP)	9
German Albums (Offizielle Top 100)	3
Greek Albums (IFPI)	15
Hungarian Albums (MAHASZ)	3
Irish Albums (IRMA)	13
Italian Albums (FIMI)	6
Japanese Albums (Oricon)	6
New Zealand Albums (RMNZ)	9
Norwegian Albums (VG-lista)	17
Polish Albums (ZPAV)	23
Portuguese Albums (AFP)	15
Slovenian Albums (IFPI)	4
Spanish Albums (Promusicae)	2
Swedish Albums (Sverigetopplistan)	4
Swiss Albums (Schweizer Hitparade)	3
UK Albums (Official Charts)	6
US Billboard 200	8

=== Year-end charts ===
2008 year-end chart performance for And Winter Came...
Chart (2008)	Position
Belgian Albums (Ultratop Flanders)	52
Belgian Albums (Ultratop Wallonia)	46
Dutch Albums (Album Top 100)	18
French Albums (SNEP)	83
German Albums (Offizielle Top 100)	66
New Zealand Albums (RMNZ)	26
Spanish Albums (PROMUSICAE)	41
Swedish Albums (Sverigetopplistan)	23
Swiss Albums (Schweizer Hitparade)	24
UK Albums (OCC)	64

2009 year-end chart performance for And Winter Came...
Chart (2009)	Position
Austrian Albums (Ö3 Austria)	46
Belgian Albums (Ultratop Flanders)	46
Belgian Albums (Ultratop Wallonia)	38
Canadian Albums (Billboard)	25
Dutch Albums (Album Top 100)	56
German Albums (Offizielle Top 100)	80
Swiss Albums (Schweizer Hitparade)	36
US Billboard 200	56

== Certifications ==
Certifications and sales for And Winter Came...
Region	Certification	Certified units/sales
Australia (ARIA)	Platinum	70,000^{^}
Austria (IFPI Austria)	Gold	10,000^{*}
Belgium (BRMA)	Platinum	30,000^{*}
Denmark (IFPI Danmark)	Gold	15,000^{^}
France (SNEP)	Gold	75,000^{*}
Germany (BVMI)	3× Gold	300,000^{‡}
Ireland (IRMA)	Platinum	15,000^{^}
Italy	—	60,000
Japan (RIAJ)	Gold	100,000^{^}
New Zealand (RMNZ)	Platinum	15,000^{^}
Russia (NFPF)	Gold	10,000^{*}
Spain (Promusicae)	Gold	40,000^{^}
Sweden (GLF)	Gold	20,000^{^}
Switzerland (IFPI Switzerland)	Platinum	30,000^{^}
United Kingdom (BPI)	Gold	100,000^{^}
United States (RIAA)	Gold	920,000
Summaries
Europe (IFPI)	Platinum	1,000,000^{*}
Worldwide	—	3,000,000
^{*} Sales figures based on certification alone.^{^} Shipments figures based on certification alone.^{‡} Sales+streaming figures based on certification alone.

- The album also peaked at number one on the Billboard Top Holiday Albums chart for a week and four weeks on the Top New Age Albums chart.
- The album peaked at No. 170 on the Billboard 200 chart in 2010.

== Release history ==
Release dates for And Winter Came...
Country	Date	Edition	Format(s)	Label	Ref.
Various	7 November 2008	Standard	CD; digital download	Warner Bros.	
Various	10 November 2008	Amazon Exclusive	Digital download	Warner Bros.	
United States	11 November 2008	Standard	CD; digital download	Reprise	
United States	20 October 2017	Standard	LP	Reprise	
Europe	12 October 2018	Standard	LP	Warner Bros.	

== See also ==
- List of Billboard Top Holiday Albums number ones of the 2000s
