= The Christmas EP =

The Christmas EP may refer to:

- The Christmas EP (Enya EP)
- The Christmas EP (Hey Monday EP)
- The Christmas EP (Richard Marx EP)
