= Sounds of the Season: The Enya Collection =

EP by Enya
- Released: 10 October 2006
- Genres: New-age; Christmas music
- Length: 18:34
- Labels: Rhino Custom Products (US); NBC Universal (US); Warner Bros. (Canada); Warner Music Canada (Canada)
- Producer: Nicky Ryan

Enya chronology
Amarantine (2005)	Sounds of the Season: The Enya Collection (2006)	And Winter Came... (2008)

Sounds of the Season: The Enya Collection is the third extended play by the Irish singer, songwriter, and musician Enya, released on 10 October 2006 exclusively in the United States in Target stores by Rhino Custom Products and NBC Universal. The EP is a collection of six Christmas songs, four of which were included in the Special Christmas Edition of Enya's sixth studio album, Amarantine. It was renamed Christmas Secrets EP for its four-track Canadian release by Warner Bros. and Warner Music Canada on 28 November 2006. On 6 December 2019, it was reissued as a digital compilation album titled Christmas Secrets, exclusively on music streaming platforms, including the tracks from the original EP and some from the album And Winter Came....

== Background ==
In 2006, Enya was approached by the Target Corporation to record an extended play of Christmas songs that would be exclusively released in its stores across the United States. Enya accepted, and produced the EP in partnership with NBC. It was first announced on the official Enya message board on 10 October 2006. To promote it, Enya performed "The Magic of the Night" and "It's in the Rain" for the Christmas in Rockefeller television show on 29 November 2006.

== Track listing ==
All music by Enya; all lyrics by Roma Ryan; all tracks produced by Nicky Ryan (Except the tracks "Adeste, Fideles", "We Wish You a Merry Christmas", "Oíche Chiúin" and "O Come, O Come, Emmanuel" that are traditional, arranging by Enya and Nicky Ryan).

=== Sounds of the Season: The Enya Collection ===
1. "Adeste, Fideles"
2. "The Magic of The Night"
3. "We Wish You a Merry Christmas"
4. "Christmas Secrets"
5. "Amid the Falling Snow"
6. "Oíche Chiúin (Silent Night)"

=== Christmas Secrets EP ===
1. "Adeste, Fideles"
2. "The Magic of the Night"
3. "We Wish You a Merry Christmas"
4. "Christmas Secrets"

=== Christmas Secrets ===
1. "Oíche Chiúin (Silent Night)"
2. "We Wish You a Merry Christmas"
3. "White Is in the Winter Night"
4. "Adeste, Fideles"
5. "Christmas Secrets"
6. "Journey of the Angels"
7. "O Come, O Come, Emmanuel"
8. "Amid the Falling Snow"
9. "The Magic of the Night"
10. "The Spirit of Christmas Past"
11. "Dreams Are More Precious"
12. "Oíche Chiúin (Chorale)"

== Personnel ==
Musicians

- Enya – vocals, instrumentation

Production

- Enya – arranging, composer
- Nicky Ryan – arranging, engineering, mixing, producer
- Roma Ryan – lyrics
- Daniel Polley – digital technician
- Dick Beetham – mastering
- Simon Fowler – photography
- Shelli Hill – executive producer for NBC Universal
- Sue Peterson – executive producer for Target Corporation
- Mithra Emami – executive producer for Warner Music Group
