= Wild Child (Enya song) =

2001 single by Enya

Single by Enya

from the album A Day Without Rain
- B-side: "Song of the Sandman (Lullaby)"; "Midnight Blue"; "Isobella"; "Flora's Secret"
- Released: 19 March 2001
- Genre: New-age
- Length: 3:48 (album version); 3:33 (radio edit/single version)
- Label: WEA
- Songwriters: Enya; Roma Ryan
- Producer: Nicky Ryan

Enya singles chronology
"Only Time" (2000)	"Wild Child" (2001)	"May It Be" (2001)

Music video
- "Wild Child" on YouTube

"Wild Child" is a single by Irish singer-songwriter Enya. It was released on 19 March 2001 as the second and final single from her fifth studio album, A Day Without Rain (2000).

== Release ==
In Germany, Japan, and Korea, the single was published only on Compact Disc; in the United Kingdom, it was also published on cassette. The B-side "Midnight Blue" was later reworked and included as the title track on Enya's 2008 studio album, And Winter Came ….

== Live performances ==
Enya performed the song at the 2001 Japan Gold Disc Award, after receiving an award for Best International Pop Albums of the Year for A Day Without Rain.

== Covers and remixes ==
Eurodance music duo CJ Crew recorded an uptempo dance mix of the song, which appeared on the compilation album Dancemania Speed 10 (2002).

Phillip Presswood recorded a cover of Wild Child on his album ENYA.

== Track listings ==
- Maxi-CD single
1. "Wild Child" (radio edit) – 3:33
2. "Midnight Blue" – 2:04
3. "Song of the Sandman (Lullaby)" – 3:40
- Cassette single
1. "Wild Child" (edit) – 3:33
2. "Isobella" – 4:27

== Charts ==
=== Weekly charts ===
Chart (2001–2002)	Peak position
Canada Radio (Nielsen BDS)	52
Canada AC (Nielsen BDS)	13
Poland (PiF PaF)	10
Scottish Singles Sales (Official Charts)	84
UK Singles (Official Charts)	72
US Adult Contemporary (Billboard)	12

=== Year-end charts ===
Chart (2002)	Position
US Adult Contemporary (Billboard)	25

== Release history ==
Region	Date	Format(s)	Label(s)	Ref.
United Kingdom	19 March 2001	CD; cassette	WEA	
Japan	22 March 2001	CD	WEA	
