= The Celts (song) =

1992 single by Enya

Single by Enya

from the album The Celts
- B-side: "Eclipse"
- Released: 2 November 1992
- Genre: New-age
- Length: 2:56
- Label: WEA
- Songwriters: Enya; Roma Ryan
- Producer: Nicky Ryan

Enya singles chronology
"Book of Days" (1992)	"The Celts" (1992)	"Anywhere Is" (1995)

Music video
- "The Celts" on YouTube

"The Celts" is a song by the Irish musician Enya, from her debut album, Enya (1987). It is written by Enya and Roma Ryan, and produced by Nicky Ryan. The song originally served as the B-side to the single "I Want Tomorrow", released in 1987. When the album was re-issued in 1992 and re-titled The Celts, the title song was released as an accompanying single by WEA, peaking at number 29 on the UK Singles Chart.

Sung entirely in Irish, it was the theme song to the 1987 BBC documentary The Celts and Channel 4's Gaelic Games coverage. The video for the song was filmed at Bodiam Castle. The B-side of the single, "Eclipse", is the song "Deireadh An Tuath" (found on Enya/The Celts album), played backwards.

== Music video ==
The music video for "The Celts" was filmed at the Bodiam Castle in East Sussex, England. It was Enya's last video directed by Michael Geoghegan.

== Charts ==
Chart (1992–1995)	Peak position
Australia (ARIA)	97
UK Singles (Official Charts)	29
UK Airplay (Music Week)	38

== Release history ==
Region	Date	Format(s)	Label(s)	Ref.
United Kingdom	2 November 1992	7-inch vinyl	WEA	
Japan	21 December 1992	CD	WEA	
Australia	30 January 1995	CD	WEA	
