= It's in the Rain =

Single by Enya

from the album Amarantine
- B-side: "A Moment Lost"; "Drifting"; "Adeste Fideles"
- Released: 2006
- Genre: New-age
- Length: 3:43
- Label: Warner Bros.
- Songwriter(s): Enya; Roma Ryan
- Producer(s): Nicky Ryan

Enya singles chronology
"Amarantine" (2005)	"It's in the Rain" (2006)	"Trains and Winter Rains" (2008)

Alternative cover
- 2006 reissue cover

Music video
- "It's in the Rain" on YouTube

"It's in the Rain" is the second European single and the third track by Irish musician Enya from her sixth studio album Amarantine (2005). It was released in some European countries in the first half of 2006 by Warner Bros. Records

In others, including the UK and Ireland, the single was released in November 2006, to promote the re-issue of the Amarantine album. This edition had a different single cover and was a double A-side with the traditional carol Adeste Fideles. Enya performed the song at the 2006 World Music Awards.

== Track listing ==
Early 2006 release

1. "It's in the Rain (radio edit)"
2. "A Moment Lost"
3. "Drifting"

November 2006 release

1. "It's in the Rain"
2. "Adeste Fideles"

== Music video ==
The music video features Enya walking through a digitally-created ink painting fantasyland. The video was directed by Tim Royes and the animation effects were created by Filipe Alçada.

== Charts ==
Chart (2005)	Peak position
Italy (FIMI)	7
UK Singles (OCC)	195
