= Tony McAuley =

- Born: Anthony; 24 October 1939; Cookstown, County Tyrone
- Died: 7 June 2003 (aged 63); Glens of Antrim
- Resting place: Cushendall, County Antrim
- Education: Queen's University Belfast

Tony McAuley (24 October 1939 – 7 June 2003) was a Northern Irish broadcaster, producer and musician.

== Biography ==
=== Early life and education ===
McAuley was born Anthony on 24 October 1939 to a chemist from Cookstown, County Tyrone. Tony was the nephew of the famous Glens of Antrim painter Charles McAuley and brother of author and broadcaster Roisin McAuley.

He was educated at Saint Patrick's College, Armagh and later at Queen's University Belfast, where he was a founding member of the Glee Club together with fellow musicians such as Phil Coulter and Paul Brady.

After qualifying as an English teacher he taught at St Patrick's College, Belfast before joining the BBC in 1972 in the Schools Department and writing and presenting Today and Yesterday.

=== Broadcasting career ===
His musical ability led him to produce and direct a groundbreaking Irish music programme titled As I Roved Out, a programme responsible for giving many musicians their first TV appearance; artists now well known such as Mary Black, Paul Brady, Christy Moore and others.

In 1983 he produced The Celts, a television series based on the book by Frank Delaney. In his search for suitable music to accompany the series he came across Enya Brennan, member of the band Clannad whom he had filmed as part of his "As I Roved Out" television series.

Tony went on to direct and record many television and radio series including a programme that brought together The Chieftains and Van Morrison. Other programmes included A Portrait of Derek Hill, In Performance, The Flight of the Earls and A Border Childhood. Throughout his time at the BBC he produced and presented numerous radio programmes and continued to present his Folk Club until the week before his death.

=== Death and afterward ===
Tony McAuley died from cancer on 7 June 2003. His funeral and interment occurred at St Mary's Church in Cushendall, County Antrim. In 2005, Irish singer, songwriter and musician Enya released the song "Amarantine" in memory of him.
