= Themes from Calmi Cuori Appassionati =

Soundtrack album by Enya
- Released: 30 October 2001
- Recorded: 1986–2000
- Studio: Aigle Studios (Artane and Killiney, Ireland); BBC Enterprises Studio Woodlands (Wood Lane, London, England)
- Genre: New-age; Celtic; instrumental
- Length: 49:12
- Label: WEA International
- Producer: Nicky Ryan

Enya chronology
A Day Without Rain (2000)	Themes from Calmi Cuori Appassionati (2001)	Only Time: The Collection (2002)

Themes from Calmi Cuori Appassionati is a soundtrack album by Irish singer, songwriter and musician Enya released in Japan on 30 October 2001 by WEA International.

It is compiled of previously released songs recorded between 1986 and 2000 that were used for the soundtrack to the 2001 Japanese romantic film Calmi Cuori Appassionati.

Effectively a "greatest hits" collection, given its inclusion of most of Enya's best-known recordings, the album entered the Japanese album chart at number two and became Enya's second album after Paint the Sky with Stars: The Very Best of Enya (1997) to sell one million copies in the country, despite the fact many of the tracks on this release were also included on Paint the Sky with Stars.

== Track listing ==
No.	Title	Length
1.	"Wild Child"	3:49
2.	"Caribbean Blue"	3:59
3.	"Book of Days"	2:56
4.	"Afer Ventus"	4:06
5.	"Watermark"	2:26
6.	"Orinoco Flow"	4:26
7.	"The Celts"	2:57
8.	"Once You Had Gold"	3:18
9.	"Triad: a. "St. Patrick"; b. "Cú Chulainn"; c. "Oisin"	4:25
10.	"Anywhere Is"	3:46
11.	"Fairytale"	3:04
12.	"Evening Falls..."	3:49
13.	"Song of the Sandman (Lullaby)"	3:42
14.	"The Promise"	2:29

== Charts ==
Chart	Position
Japanese Oricon Albums Chart	2

== Certifications ==
Region	Certification	Certified units/sales
Japan (RIAJ)	Million	1,000,000^{^}
^{^} Shipments figures based on certification alone.

== Release history ==
Country	Date	Format	Label
Japan	30 October 2001	CD; cassette	WEA
