= Tim Royes =

American music video director (1964–2007)

Tim Royes (25 December 1964 – 13 August 2007) was a British music video director and editor. He had directed and produced videos for artists such as Westlife ("Mandy"), Melanie C ("I Want Candy", "The Moment You Believe", "Carolyna"), Emma Bunton ("Free Me"), the Sugababes ("Easy" and "Red Dress"), Rachel Stevens ("Sweet Dreams My L.A. Ex"), and Enya ("Amarantine" and "It's in the Rain").

== Videos ==
Royes directed and produced several videos in the 1990s and 2000s. Some of these centered on adult content, occasionally creating a sizable media stir, the central one being Holly Valance's video "Kiss Kiss", where she appeared in a flesh-coloured body suit to appear naked. Something similar happened in 2007, when Melanie C's music video of the '80s hit "I Want Candy" showed the singer in a skin-tight cat suit and featured a sexually suggestive dance routine with half-naked bodybuilders in crowd-controller uniforms. The video instantly grabbed the number one spot on YouTube with 200,000 hits on its first day.

== Death ==
Royes died at the age of 42, after being struck by the driver of a vehicle in Manhattan, New York City in the early hours of the morning of 13 August 2007.

== Dedications ==
Sugababes dedicated their 2007 music video "About You Now", directed by Marcus Adams, to Royes' memory, with a black screen saying, "In Memory of Tim Royes – 25.12.1964–13.08.2007 RIP" at the end of the video.

As a tribute to Royes, Melanie C filmed her new video for the title track for her album This Time in September 2007 Adrian Moat, who was a good friend of Royes.

Darren Hayes posted his 2004 video "Darkness" in 2018 recalling Royes having shot the video just a few years before his death.

Enya dedicated the song "Journey of the Angels" to Royes, as mentioned in the album booklet for her 2008 album And Winter Came....

== Videography ==
- Tasmin Archer - "Lords of the New Church" (1993)
- Eternal – "So Good" (1994)
- Eternal – "Oh Baby I..." (1994)
- Adiemus – "Adiemus" (1995)
- Louise – "In Walked Love" (1996)
- Faith No More – "Ashes to Ashes" (1997)
- Elton John – "Something About the Way You Look Tonight" (1997)
- Mica Paris - "Carefree" (1998)
- B*Witched – "Jump Down" (2000)
- Five featuring Queen – "We Will Rock You" (2000)
- Girl Thing – "Girls on Top" (2000)
- Alsou – "Before You Love Me" (2001)
- Louise – "Stuck in the Middle with You" (2001)
- Honeyz – "Talk To The Hand" (2001)
- Holly Valance – "Kiss Kiss" (2002)
- Romeo - "Romeo Dunn" (2002)
- Will Young & Gareth Gates – "The Long and Winding Road" (2002)
- Holly Valance – "Down Boy" (2002)
- Will Young – "You and I" (2002)
- Emma Bunton – "Free Me (2003)
- Appleton – "Don't Worry" (2003)
- Lisa Maffia – "In Love" (2003)
- Rachel Stevens – "Sweet Dreams My L.A. Ex" (2003)
- Skin – "Faithfulness" (2003)
- Westlife – "Mandy" (2003)
- Shaznay Lewis - "Never Felt Like This Before" (2004)
- Beverley Knight – "Not Too Late for Love" (2004)
- Darren Hayes – Darkness (2004)
- Green Day – "Boulevard of Broken Dreams" (2004) (editor, won MTV Video Music Award for Best Editing)
- Enya – "Amarantine" (2005)
- Enya – "It's in the Rain" (2005)
- Texas – "Getaway" (2005)
- Green Day - Bullet in a Bible (editor, 2005)
- Sugababes – "Red Dress" (2006)
- Lee Ryan – "When I Think of You" (2006)
- Bananarama – "Look on the Floor (Hypnotic Tango)" (2006)
- Sugababes – "Easy" (2006)
- Melanie C – "The Moment You Believe" (2007)
- Melanie C – "I Want Candy" (2007)
- Melanie C – "Carolyna" (2007)
