= Amarantine (album) =

- Standard edition cover. The Special Christmas edition includes a starry, dark blue background.

Studio album by Enya
- Released: 21 November 2005
- Recorded: September 2003 – September 2005
- Studios: Aigle Studio, Killiney, County Dublin, Ireland
- Genre: New-age
- Length: 45:34 (standard edition); 60:32 (special christmas edition)
- Labels: Warner Bros. (EU); Reprise (US)
- Producer: Nicky Ryan

Enya chronology
Only Time – The Collection (2002)	Amarantine (2005)	Sounds of the Season: The Enya Collection (2006)

Singles from Amarantine
- 1. "Amarantine" Released: 5 December 2005; 2. "It's in the Rain" Released: November 2006

Amarantine is the sixth studio album by Irish singer and composer Enya, released on 21 November 2005 by Warner Bros. Records internationally and by Reprise Records in the United States the next day. Following the release of her 2002 compilation box set Only Time – The Collection, Enya took a short break before she started work on a new album in September 2003, her first since A Day Without Rain (2000). Amarantine was recorded in Ireland with her longtime recording partners, arranger and producer Nicky Ryan and his wife, lyricist Roma Ryan. It is Enya's first album not to include a song in Irish and her first to include songs sung in Japanese and Loxian, a fictional language created by Roma.

Amarantine received mixed reviews from critics, but it was a commercial success and reached No. 6 on the Billboard 200 in the United States, where it sold one million copies in its first month of release, and No. 8 on the UK Albums Chart. Enya released two singles from the album, "Amarantine" and "It's in the Rain". A Christmas Special Edition was released on the album's one year anniversary, and a collectors' edition with a book shortly after. To promote the album, Enya did several interviews and televised performances, including the 2006 World Music Awards. In 2007, the album won Enya her fourth Grammy Award for Best New Age Album. According to Nielsen SoundScan, it was the third top-selling new age album of the 2000s in the United States.

== Recording and music ==
After the release of her box set Only Time – The Collection in November 2002, Enya took several months off from writing, recording, and releasing music. She resumed in September 2003, starting work on Amarantine, her first studio album since her commercially successful 2000 release, A Day Without Rain. She worked with her longtime recording partners, producer and arranger Nicky Ryan and his wife, lyricist Roma Ryan. Recording took place at Aigle Studio, a facility installed at the Ryan's home in Killiney, County Dublin in Ireland. Enya adopted a five-day working schedule to work on the album, working from 10 a.m. to 6 p.m. and taking weekends off. The album was dedicated to BBC producer Tony McAuley, who commissioned Enya to compose the soundtrack to the 1987 BBC documentary series The Celts which was subsequently released as her debut album, Enya (1987); McAuley died in 2003.

The album was Enya's first of her career not to include a song sung in Irish, her first language. "Amarantine" is a love song, of which its title is a word that Enya said addresses the idea of everlasting and love. Roma first used the word in "Flora's Secret" on A Day Without Rain, where it was spelt as "amaranthine". In her notes about the song, Roma wrote the track is "a song of sadness", adding: "for how else can one describe such sorrow? Not knowing where a loved one is, not knowing how they are, not knowing how to find them". The idea of returning home after a long journey is what "Long Long Journey" was written about, and is a theme Enya has covered across her career. The lyrics to "Sumiregusa" are inspired by hokku, the opening stanza to the Japanese form of poetry renga and renku, written by the poet Matsuo Bashō who once felt his heart leap "at the sight of a wild violet". The theme of sadness is revisited on "Someone Said Goodbye", a song about one reflecting on life, which at times may bring on sad feelings. "A Moment Lost" addressed two ideas: the regretful feeling of words spoken at times of anger by a loved one that leave a mark on one's heart, and a song of love that in turn heals it and forgives. "Drifting" is an instrumental that developed from a piano melody, typical of Enya's other instrumental tracks. According to Roma, "Amid the Falling Snow" is inspired by a child or a person's amazement of seeing snowfall for the first time, and Christmas time in general.

Amarantine features Enya singing in two languages for the first time. "Sumiregusa (Wild Violet)" is sung in Japanese, and its opening bars are taken from an arrangement of the hymn "Hark! The Vesper Hymn Is Stealing" by the Irish composer John Andrew Stevenson. The album also marks the first published use of Loxian, a fictional language created by Roma Ryan during the development of "Water Shows the Hidden Heart". The track tells the story of a man who is looking for "whom he loves and has lost" and the emotions he experiences. Attempts to sing the song with a set of English, Irish and Latin lyrics did not provide results strong enough, causing Roma to suggest the idea of a new language, inspired by the fictional Elvish languages by author J. R. R. Tolkien that she had used for Enya's songs "May It Be" and "Aníron" for The Lord of the Rings: The Fellowship of the Ring (2001), and the wordless sounds Enya made while singing to the songs she was working on in the studio. Roma said she created words for Enya's voice "so the poetry of the lyrics sit on the curves of the music", and initially named it Errakan. The idea was a success, which led its name changing to Loxian, and Roma creating a culture and history behind it that concerned the Loxians, a race from another planet who question the existence of life on another. Enya took a liking to the language, and sung "Less Than a Pearl" and "The River Sings" in Loxian. Roma described the latter track as a song whereby the Loxians "send their words out into the night ... expressing their quest to discover if they are alone in the universe". In December 2005, Roma released a book about Loxian titled Water Shows the Hidden Heart.

== Release and reception ==
Professional ratings
Aggregate scores
Source	Rating
Metacritic	55/100
Review scores
Source	Rating
AllMusic	3.5/5 stars
Billboard	mixed
E! Online	C
Entertainment.ie	4/5 stars
Entertainment Weekly	C
The New York Times	unfavorable
Uncut	3/5 stars
USA Today	2.5/4 stars

An album launch party was held on 27 October 2005 at Château de Vaux-le-Vicomte in Maincy, France. The album was first released on 21 November 2005 by Warner Bros. Records internationally and on 22 November 2005 by Reprise Records in the United States. In addition to the standard version, a Christmas special edition was released on 21 November 2006 that included a second disc of four Christmas songs: "Adeste, Fideles", "The Magic of the Night", "We Wish You a Merry Christmas" and "Christmas Secrets". These four tracks were released as an extended play named Sounds of the Season: The Enya Holiday Collection in the United States and Christmas Secrets EP in Canada. A deluxe collector's edition followed on 27 November 2006 that contained the album, the second edition of the book Water Shows the Hidden Heart by Roma Ryan, and three exclusive photos.

The album became a worldwide chart success, reaching its peak of number 8 on the UK Albums Chart during its first week on the chart out of a total 13-week run. and number 6 on the Billboard 200 in the United States during a 33-week stay on the chart. On the Billboard Top New-Age Albums chart, Amarantine spent 38 weeks at number one. In November 2008, the album had sold 1,344,593 certified units in the United States. In September 2004, "Sumiregusa (Wild Violet)" was released as a single in Japan as part of a television advertising campaign for Panasonic.

Amarantine received mixed reviews from music critics. At Metacritic, which assigns a normalised rating out of 100 to reviews from mainstream critics, the album received an average score of 55, which indicates "mixed or average reviews", based on 7 reviews. Sarah Tomlinson wrote a positive review in The Boston Globe, remarking that the album displays Enya's "trademark dreamy elegance". A review from Daniel Durchholz was published in The Washington Post, with Durchholz welcoming the use of Japanese and Loxian lyrics as he noted Roma's English lyrics "are often banal", but wrote "What's left is the music's epic sweep and the crystalline beauty of Enya's voice. Neither is insubstantial, nor particularly arresting ... Enya succeeds here in crafting the perfect soundtrack to an evening by the fire". In a review for the Associated Press published in The Daily Herald, Matt Moore wrote that like her previous albums, Amarantine is "haunting and ethereal, with music that undulates in soft, almost shimmering fashion". The songs, he thought, are "a welcome offering of soft yet rhythmic vocals, lush instrumentation and lyrics", which make up a "decidedly satisfying" album that does not break any new ground but nonetheless "excels at setting the mood". Jeff Miers in The Buffalo News gave the album three stars out of four, writing the album "Does nothing to modify or update the formula ... Why should it? ... She does what she's good at, which is conjure mystical dream worlds bathed in multitracked vocal harmonies and enough reverb to make Phil Spector nervous". To Miers the songs sound "ancient" in their melodic construction with a sound that he compared to a "Celtic Brian Eno". He concluded with "It's all very beautiful, like the best church music". The album was given a "C+" rating by Christopher Blagg in The Boston Herald.

"Drifting" received a Grammy Award nomination for Best Pop Instrumental Performance.

== Track listing ==
All music by Enya, all lyrics by Roma Ryan, and all tracks produced by Nicky Ryan, except "Adeste, Fideles" and "We Wish You a Merry Christmas" traditional, arr. Enya and N. Ryan.

Amarantine – Standard edition
No.	Title	Length
1.	"Less Than a Pearl"	3:44
2.	"Amarantine"	3:10
3.	"It's in the Rain"	4:07
4.	"If I Could Be Where You Are"	4:01
5.	"The River Sings"	2:50
6.	"Long Long Journey"	3:16
7.	"Sumiregusa (Wild Violet)"	4:42
8.	"Someone Said Goodbye"	4:00
9.	"A Moment Lost"	3:09
10.	"Drifting"	4:11
11.	"Amid the Falling Snow"	3:38
12.	"Water Shows the Hidden Heart"	4:41
Total length:		45:34

Amarantine – Special Christmas edition (bonus disc)
No.	Title	Length
1.	"Adeste, Fideles"	3:58
2.	"The Magic of the Night"	3:34
3.	"We Wish You a Merry Christmas"	3:39
4.	"Christmas Secrets"	3:47
Total length:		60:32

== Personnel ==
Credits are adapted from the album's 2006 liner notes.

Musicians

- Enya – vocals, instruments

Production

- Enya – arrangement, mixing
- Nicky Ryan – production, arrangement, engineering, mixing, conceptual cover design, inner sleeve design and artwork, layout
- Roma Ryan – Loxian language and font, lyrics (except "Adeste, Fideles" and "We Wish You a Merry Christmas")
- Dick Beetham – mastering at 360 Mastering, London
- Daniel Polley – digital technical adviser, engineering
- Simon Fowler – photography
- Ebony Ryan – conceptual cover design, inner sleeve design, layout
- Persia Ryan – inner sleeve artwork
- Intro – cover and inner sleeve production

== Charts ==
=== Weekly charts ===
Weekly chart performance for Amarantine
Chart (2005)	Peak position
Australian Albums (ARIA)	13
Austrian Albums (Ö3 Austria)	4
Belgian Albums (Ultratop Flanders)	1
Belgian Albums (Ultratop Wallonia)	2
Canadian Albums (Billboard)	4
Danish Albums (Hitlisten)	7
Dutch Albums (Album Top 100)	5
Finnish Albums (Suomen virallinen lista)	22
French Albums (SNEP)	5
German Albums (Offizielle Top 100)	3
Greek Albums (IFPI Greece)	12
Hungarian Albums (MAHASZ)	7
Irish Albums (IRMA)	15
Italian Albums (FIMI)	8
Japanese Albums (Oricon)	2
New Zealand Albums (RMNZ)	10
Norwegian Albums (VG-lista)	13
Portuguese Albums (AFP)	5
Spanish Albums (Promusicae)	9
Swedish Albums (Sverigetopplistan)	4
Swiss Albums (Schweizer Hitparade)	3
Taiwanese Albums (Five Music)	2
UK Albums (Official Charts)	8
US Billboard 200	6

=== Year-end charts ===
2005 year-end chart performance for Amarantine
Chart (2005)	Position
Australian Albums (ARIA)	91
Austrian Albums (Ö3 Austria)	59
Belgian Albums (Ultratop Flanders)	26
Belgian Albums (Ultratop Wallonia)	19
Danish Albums (Hitlisten)	35
Dutch Albums (Album Top 100)	35
French Albums (SNEP)	47
Italian Albums (FIMI)	45
Swedish Albums (Sverigetopplistan)	31
UK Albums (OCC)	69
Worldwide Albums (IFPI)	15

2006 year-end chart performance for Amarantine
Chart (2006)	Position
Australian Albums (ARIA)	84
Austrian Albums (Ö3 Austria)	28
Belgian Albums (Ultratop Flanders)	61
Belgian Albums (Ultratop Wallonia)	31
Dutch Albums (Album Top 100)	20
French Albums (SNEP)	74
German Albums (Offizielle Top 100)	21
Japanese Albums (Oricon)	34
Swiss Albums (Schweizer Hitparade)	10
US Billboard 200	35

== Certifications and sales ==
Region	Certification	Certified units/sales
Argentina (CAPIF)	Gold	20,000^{^}
Australia (ARIA)	Platinum	70,000^{^}
Belgium (BRMA)	Platinum	50,000^{*}
Brazil (Pro-Música Brasil)	Gold	50,000^{*}
Denmark (IFPI Danmark)	Gold	20,000^{^}
France (SNEP)	Platinum	300,000^{*}
Germany (BVMI)	2× Platinum	400,000^{^}
Hungary (MAHASZ)	Gold	5,000^{^}
Ireland (IRMA)	Platinum	15,000^{^}
Italy 2006 sales	—	120,000
Japan (RIAJ)	2× Platinum	500,000^{^}
Mexico (AMPROFON)	Gold	50,000^{^}
Netherlands (NVPI)	Gold	40,000^{^}
New Zealand (RMNZ)	Platinum	15,000^{^}
Poland (ZPAV)	Gold	14,000
Portugal (AFP)	Platinum	20,000^{^}
South Korea	—	6,810
Spain (Promusicae)	Gold	40,000^{^}
Sweden (GLF)	Gold	30,000^{^}
Switzerland (IFPI Switzerland)	2× Platinum	80,000^{^}
United Kingdom (BPI)	Platinum	300,000^{^}
United States (RIAA)	Platinum	1,000,000^{^}
Summaries
Europe (IFPI)	Platinum	1,000,000^{*}
^{*} Sales figures based on certification alone.^{^} Shipments figures based on certification alone.

== Release history ==
Country	Date	Edition	Format(s)	Label	Ref.
Various	21 November 2005	Standard	CD; digital download	Warner Bros.	
United States	22 November 2005	Standard	CD; digital download	Reprise	
Various	21 November 2006	Special Christmas	CD; digital download	Warner Bros.	
United States	14 July 2017	Standard	LP	Reprise	
Europe	12 October 2018	Standard	LP	Warner Bros.	
