= Loxian =

Fictional artistic language

- Created by: Roma Ryan
- Date: 2005
- Setting and usage: 'Beings on another planet'
- Purpose: constructed languages: artistic languages; fictional languages; Loxian
- Sources: based on snippets of English, Irish, Old English, Hindi, Welsh and Siberian Yupik

Language codes
- ISO 639-3: qlx (local use)
- Glottolog: None
- IETF: art-x-loxian

Loxian is a fictional artistic language and alphabet created by Irish poet and lyricist Roma Ryan. A longtime recording and business partner of Irish singer and composer Enya, Ryan created the language during the production of the latter's sixth studio album, Amarantine (2005). Enya has sung the Loxian phonetics in some of her songs since the language was developed.

== Development ==
=== Origins ===
During the recording of "Water Shows the Hidden Heart", a track on Amarantine, Enya had sung its lyrics in English, Irish and Latin but found none was suitable in getting the message of the song across in a way that they were happy with. Ryan then wrote the first expression in Loxian, spelled in English as "Syoombraya". After Enya sang it and was pleased with it, Ryan developed the language further and used it for two other tracks on Amarantine—"Less Than a Pearl" and "The River Sings". In the liner notes to the 2009 compilation album The Very Best of Enya, "It has been a truly unique journey ... We have journeyed from Aldebaran, the track that tells of the future migration of the Celts through space, to the three Loxian songs of Amarantine, which were born of Aldebaran". Enya recorded "Aldebaran" and released it on her debut album, Enya, first released in 1986.

=== Etymology ===
The name "Loxian" was taken from the epithet of the Greek and Roman god Apollo, the god of prophecy, truth, the sun, among others. As Ryan wrote: "A God of the sun whose name we have given to those who travel to the moon. It is a subtle irony. So, too, is the language of the Loxians, whose words we have woven into these songs, yet those very words belong to a future migration travelling beyond Aldebaran." Ryan used this particular name to link the history of this future generation of space travellers to us, their ancestors.

=== Loxian scripts ===
Loxian has six basic scripts or alphabets: ea (the Water Script), pirrro (the Rain Script also called the Vernal Script), luua (the Shadow Script of summer), essa (the Autumnal Scripts of the winds – this particular season of scripts has many forms), ju (the Winter Script which has two visual alphabets) and kan (the Moon Script or Archer Script).

The Loxian scripts draw on visual origins. The script used in the booklet for Amarantine and in Ryan's book Water Shows the Hidden Heart is the ea script. Ryan has combined two influences in this particular script. She says "The Old English word for water is 'ea' (in Middle English the word came to mean 'river' or 'running water') and the design for the alphabet came from water – the letters are, in fact, the common English alphabet used today. The shapes for this alphabet were created from water. I made the letters from water, which, being a fluid form, metamorphosed into the Loxian alphabet of Ea." All of the remaining scripts are based on visual inspiration. As Ryan says – "Loxian began its life as a series of sounds. It was originally meant for only one song, and was to have no meaning, to be a 'soundscape'. The soundscape was Nicky’s idea. I had difficulty with the idea of having purely sounds in the song, and so began to create a meaning and a history behind them purely for myself. Then, as Enya wanted to use the ‘sounds’ or ‘words’ in two other tracks, Loxian was born. It developed into what I would call an art language. I was trying to create an experience; an expression that portrayed Nicky and Enya's vision. I was not trying to create a new language, per se. Yet ironically, even now, the Loxian language continues to grow.”

=== Purpose and background ===
Ryan, however, has said that while creating this ‘new language’ she was also very much aware of the fact that many of the languages of our world were dying. She said “Loxian is purely artistic and, although I have given it a history and culture, its primary function is still artistic. We are losing so many world languages. Language is more than everyday communication, it holds history, customs and information about its people and their way of life. As the Living Tongues Institute for Endangered Languages tells us – roughly every two weeks a language dies”.

Roma Ryan has written a book which explores some of the world of the Loxians and gives some background information on the three Loxian songs. The book Water Shows the Hidden Heart was released in two formats. The original, issued in 2005, is now out of print. A second publication was released by Warner Music in 2006. Each of these publications contains a book of poetry within it; the first contains the Amarantine poetry, and the latter poetry from "The Way Obsidian Sings".

=== Further uses ===
Ryan also created an interactive, on-line game – The Loxian Games – which also explores the Loxian language and the Loxian world. It takes the form of riddles, quests and ‘treasure hunts’ and again has a strong visual aspect to it.

The language is used for the second time in song in Enya's 2015 album Dark Sky Island, on two tracks which follow the 'intergalactic' theme of the title - "The Forge of The Angels" and "The Loxian Gates". The narratives of these songs were said to continue the futuristic narrative Loxian is used for.
