= The Frog Prince (album) =

The Frog Prince: The Original Soundtrack Recording

Soundtrack album by Enya
- Released: 21 October 1985 (ISCA 10, ISTA 10)
- Label: Island Visual Arts
- Producer: Enya; Nicky Ryan; Richard Myhill

Enya chronology
Fuaim (1982)	The Frog Prince: The Original Soundtrack Recording (1985)	Enya (1987)

The Frog Prince: The Original Soundtrack Recording is a soundtrack album to the English and French produced romantic comedy film The Frog Prince (1984), released in 1985 by Island Visual Arts, a subsidiary label of Island Records. The music was composed by Irish singer-songwriter and musician Enya, but only two of its tracks, "The Frog Prince" and "Dreams", were performed by her with the remaining tracks performed by other musicians or arranged and produced by Richard Myhill; several jazz standards are also performed. It was reissued in August 1999 by Spectrum Music.

== Track listing ==
Side one
No.	Title	Music	Performer	Length
1.	"The Train to Paris"	Enya	Richard Myhill	2:14
2.	"The First Day"	Enya	Richard Myhill	1:32
3.	"Mack the Knife"	Kurt Weill	Jazz Club	2:16
4.	"Let It Be Me"	Gilbert Bécaud	Jazz Club	3:15
5.	"With Jean-Phillippe"	Enya	Richard Myhill	2:16
6.	"Jenny"	Enya	Richard Myhill	1:07
7.	"Reflections"	Enya	Richard Myhill	1:08
8.	"The Frog Prince"	Enya, Roma Ryan (lyrics)	Enya	3:15

Side two
No.	Title	Music	Performer	Length
1.	"Dreams"	Enya, Charlie McGettigan (lyrics)	Enya	3:38
2.	"The Kiss"	Enya	Richard Myhill	1:56
3.	"Sweet Georgia Brown"	Maceo Pinkard, Ben Bernie, Kenneth Casey	Jazz Club	2:11
4.	"Georgia on My Mind"	Stuart Gorrell, Hoagy Carmichael	Jazz Club	3:56
5.	"A Kiss by the Fountain"	Enya	Richard Myhill	1:52
6.	"Jenny & Roz"	Enya	Richard Myhill	1:22
7.	"Les Flon-Flons du Bal"	Charles Dumont, Michel Vaucaire	Édith Piaf	2:20
8.	"Epilogue"	Enya	Richard Myhill	0:57

== Personnel ==
- Enya – lead vocals ("The Frog Prince" and "Dreams"), various instruments

Additional personnel

- Jazz Club – performer on "Mack the Knife", "Let It Be Me", "Sweet Georgia Brown", and "Georgia on My Mind"
- Édith Piaf – lead vocals ("Les Flon-Flons du Bal")
- Roma Ryan – lyrics ("The Frog Prince")
- Charlie McGettigan – lyrics ("Dreams")

Production

- Nicky Ryan – producer ("The Frog Prince" and "Dreams")
- Richard Myhill – producer, arranger (Enya-composed tracks)
- Philip Begley – engineer (Enya-composed tracks)
- Steve Allan – engineer
- Andrew Boland – mixer (Enya-composed tracks)
