= The Celts (1987 TV series) =

British documentary series

- DVD cover
- Genre: Documentary series
- Written by: Frank Delaney
- Directed by: David Richardson
- Presented by: Frank Delaney
- Opening theme: "The Celts"
- Composer: Enya
- Country of origin: United Kingdom
- Original language: English
- No. of series: 1
- No. of episodes: 6

Production
- Running time: 60 minutes (per episode)
- Production company: British Broadcasting Corporation

Original release
- Network: BBC2
- Release: 14 May – 18 June 1987

The Celts: Rich Traditions and Ancient Myths is a 1987 documentary series that examines the origins, growth, and influence of Celtic culture in Great Britain and throughout Europe.

The series was directed by David Richardson, written and presented by Frank Delaney, produced by the British Broadcasting Corporation, and broadcast on BBC2. The series was released on DVD in Europe and North America in 2004. Delaney also wrote a six-chapter companion book, extended with four tales from Irish mythology.

== Episodes ==
1. "The Man with the Golden Shoes" covers the archaeological and historical evidence for the Celts and the extent of their civilisation across the European continent, including the two core periods of Celtic culture (i.e. Hallstatt culture and La Tène culture).
2. "The Birth of Nations" shows the formation of the modern Celtic nations from the ashes of the Roman conquest and fall.
3. "A Pagan Trinity" discusses Celtic mythology, legend, and belief, and then the introduction of Christian faith to the Irish and Scots.
4. "The Open-Ended Curve" presents the distinctive physical art of the Celts, both ancient and modern.
5. "The Final Conflict" returns to history, presenting the conquest of the modern Celtic nations by neighbouring England and France, with a detailed review of the attempted destruction of the Welsh language, the Irish resistance and revolution, and the immigration of the Irish and others to North America.
6. "The Legacy" is a discussion on the degree to which modern people may view themselves as Celts, with examples of modern Celtic-inspired practices like military discipline and warfare, the Welsh Eisteddfod, modern Irish music and art, and the efforts of the Bretons and Cape Bretoners to preserve their native languages in the face of societal assimilation by their ruling nations. Some of this episode was filmed in Portmeirion, Wales and makes references to the 1960s series The Prisoner.

== Soundtrack ==
The series introduced the music of Irish singer Enya to a wider audience. Enya, formerly a member of the Celtic music group Clannad, was commissioned by David Richardson to compose the score for the series. Each episode of the series begins with the series' theme song, "The Celts". Two episodes include music videos of Enya performing the songs "I Want Tomorrow" and "Aldebaran" and she is also glimpsed performing the title track at the conclusion of the opening credits of each episode. The DVD includes an interview and several contemporary musical performances by Enya.

The soundtrack album for The Celts was first released in 1987 by BBC Records under the title Enya. It reached No.69 in the UK albums chart. It was later reissued in North America by Atlantic Records. In 1992, Reprise Records, the licensees of Enya's later popular recordings such as "Orinoco Flow", obtained the rights to the Enya album and it was remastered and reissued under the title The Celts. This time the album reached No.10 in the UK. Also, Enya appeared in a new music video to promote the title song, and a CD-single of the theme song was released.
