= Nicky Ryan =

Irish music producer (1946–2025)

- Born: Nicholas Dominick Ryan; 14 July 1946; Dublin, Ireland
- Died: 10 September 2025 (aged 79) Dublin, Ireland
- Occupations: Music producer; manager; recording engineer
- Spouse: Roma Ryan (m. mid-1980s, year unknown)

Nicholas Dominick Ryan (14 July 1946 – 10 September 2025) was an Irish music producer, recording engineer and manager. He was best known as the longtime business and recording partner for the singer, songwriter and musician Enya alongside his wife, poet and lyricist Roma Ryan. Born and raised in Dublin, Ryan gained initial recognition in the 1970s and 1980s for his work with several artists including Gary Moore, Planxty, Christy Moore and Clannad.

== Early life and career beginnings ==
Ryan was born in Dublin, Ireland on 14 July 1946 to Monica "Mona" and Ned Ryan. He grew up on Caledon Road in the East Wall area of Dublin, and was the youngest of seven siblings: brother Michael, and sisters Gretta, Winifred "Winnie", Gertrude, Monica, and a sister named Eithne. Between helping his father out with delivering coal, Ryan enjoyed recording the singing of his sisters and family friends with a reel-to-reel tape recorder.

In his teen years, Ryan won a music competition with a mouth music rendition of "In the Mood" by Glenn Miller. The prize was to meet and sit in on a studio session of the Beatles, one of his favourite bands. However, Ryan could not claim the prize as he could not afford the fare to England to see them.

After finishing school, Ryan worked as a teacher at St. Mary's School for Deaf Girls in Dublin, run by Dominican nuns, where he experimented with sound engineering to create a way for the deaf children to "hear" music. He designed a speaker system based on the lower end of a pipe organ that allowed for considerable bass to travel across a spring floor in the school's dance room and in their chests, so they can detect the rhythm. "It was an upright speaker consisting of a 14in square box, about six feet tall, and about six inches from the floor – with a 12-inch speaker facing upwards, and a three inch port below that. And it worked very well. [...] The floor shook – and the kids danced away, as they were entitled to."

== Career progression; Enya project ==
In the 1970s and 1980s, Ryan gained recognition for his involvement with several artists including Gary Moore, Planxty, Thin Lizzy, and Christy Moore.

Ryan was introduced to the family Celtic band Clannad by their manager Fachtna O'Kelly. In 1975, Ryan became the sound engineer for Clannad and from 1976, their new manager, along with his then girlfriend Roma, after O'Kelly left to manage The Boomtown Rats.

In 1980, Ryan persuaded the then 18-year-old Eithne Ní Bhraonáin, later known as Enya, also the younger sister of siblings Máire, Pól and Ciarán Brennan, to join the band with them and twin uncles, Noel and Pádraig Duggan. During her two-year stint in the group, Ryan and Enya often discussed his idea of recording many vocal tracks and layering them to create a sound effect inspired by the wall of sound technique developed by Phil Spector.

In 1982, the Ryans left Clannad and formed a partnership with Enya after the latter wished to pursue a solo career, with Ryan her producer and arranger and Roma her lyricist. Upon Ryan's suggestion, the name Enya (anglicisation of Donegal-pronounced Eithne) was suggested, and has been used as her artist name since around 1983. For the next seven years, Enya lived with the Ryans and their daughters in Artane, a northern Dublin suburb, while she practised her music skills and recorded a selection of demos. In September 1983, the three became directors of their music company Aigle Music, with "aigle" being the French word for "eagle". Using a mixing board originally made for Clannad, the three constructed a home recording facility and named it Aigle Studio.

The trio shared a lasting partnership of over 4 decades, releasing 8 studio albums and two main compilations, the latter of which Ryan contributed some of his background to, in the liner notes of The Very Best of Enya in 2009.

== Personal life and interests ==
Ryan was a long-time partner and later husband of Roma (née Shane). They had two daughters together, Ebony (b. 1978) and Persia (b. 1983). Enya is godmother to Persia, who was born during her time living with the Ryans. The sisters both helped with artwork contributions for the 2005 album Amarantine.

In addition to music and his fascination with sound, Ryan also 'had a profound interest in astronomy and would often wrap his daughters in blankets and take them out into the garden to look at the night sky. He also read extensively, was interested in art and regularly walked Killiney Hill'.

== Death ==
The first official news of Ryan's death was shared by Irish music publication Hot Press on 11 September, with the publication understanding 'that Nicky had gone into hospital for tests, but there were sudden complications'. His death was later confirmed to have occurred on 10 September, at St Vincent's Private Hospital in Dublin.

Ryan lay in repose on 14 September 2025 at Quinn's of Glasthule before being taken to the National Maritime Museum in Dún Laoghaire, Ireland, where a humanist funeral ceremony took place on 15 September 2025, followed by a private burial attended by immediate family. At Ryan's funeral, the songs chosen included a choral rendition of the Beatles' "All You Need Is Love", "Avalon" by Bryan Ferry of Roxy Music, and the trio's last title track together, Enya's 2015 album Dark Sky Island.

Ryan is survived by Roma, his "wife, soul-mate and best friend for just short of 50 years", his daughters Ebony and Persia, and his "beloved friend and colleague" Enya.

== Tributes and legacy ==
An open condolence book was created, where several fans and people who knew him, including his brother Michael, left tributes and messages of condolence. Several Irish artists he worked with also paid tribute, and Warner Music Ireland issued a statement. Irish president Michael D. Higgins also shared an official statement on 12 September acknowledging Ryan's death and the unique work of the Enya trio and Ryan's production.

Ryan's work revolutionised the Irish musical landscape; sound engineering and producing for several Irish artists, and inspired countless producers and reverb enthusiasts worldwide. Enya's solo career, largely supported by Ryan's production and occasional vocal, instrumental, and textural additions and guidance, spanned over 40 years, with the release of Enya music between 1984 to 2015.

== Discography ==
- 1976 – Dúlamán – Clannad
- 1978 – Live in Dublin – Christy Moore
- 1979 – Clannad in Concert – Clannad
- 1980 – Crann Úll – Clannad
- 1982 – Fuaim – Clannad
- 1985 – The Frog Prince – The Original Soundtrack Recording – Enya and other artists – (two tracks only: "The Frog Prince" and "Dreams")
- 1987 – Enya – Enya
- 1987 – Stony Steps – Matt Molloy
- 1987 – Cosa Gan Bhróga – Eithne Ní Uallacháin, Gerry O'Connor and Desi Wilkinson
- 1988 – Watermark – Enya
- 1989 – Lead the Knave – Nollaig Casey
- 1991 – Shepherd Moons – Enya
- 1995 – Take the Air – Sean Ryan
- 1995 – The Memory of Trees – Enya
- 1997 – Paint the Sky with Stars – Enya
- 1997 – A Box of Dreams – Enya
- 1999 – Across the Bridge of Hope – Various Artists
- 2000 – Srenga Oir – John Feeley
- 2000 – A Day Without Rain – Enya
- 2001 – Calmi Cuori Appassionati – Themes from Calmi Cuori Appassionati – (soundtrack) – Enya
- 2001 – The Lord of the Rings: The Fellowship of the Ring – Original Motion Picture Soundtrack – Howard Shore – (two tracks only: "Aníron" and "May It Be")
- 2002 – Only Time: The Collection – Enya
- 2005 – Amarantine – Enya
- 2006 – Sounds of the Season: The Enya Collection – Enya
- 2008 – And Winter Came... – Enya
- 2009 – The Very Best of Enya – Enya
- 2015 – Dark Sky Island – Enya
