= Roma Ryan =

Northern Irish writer, poet, Enya lyricist (b. 1954)

- Born: Roma Shane Forbes; 20 January 1950 (age 76); Belfast, Northern Ireland
- Genres: New-age, Celtic, world
- Occupations: lyricist, poet, writer
- Years active: 1982–present
- Labels: WEA, Warner Music UK, Warner Bros. Records UK, Reprise, Geffen
- Spouse: Nicky Ryan (d. 2025)
- Website: romaryan.com valleydwellers.com

Roma Shane Ryan (born 20 January 1950) is an Irish writer, poet, and lyricist who lives in Killiney, Ireland. She is the primary lyricist for the singer Enya, who has stated that the importance of her and her late husband Nicky Ryan's contributions is such that without them, Enya would not exist.

== Early life ==
Roma Shane Forbes was born in Belfast, Northern Ireland, and grew up in the area of Castlereagh. She is the eldest of four siblings born to the late Eleanor "Ellie", and Ernest "Ernie" Forbes.

Her mother was a hairdresser, who died of cancer in the late 1960s, when Ryan was young, and her father was a fireman. The couple had met at a musical theatre group in Dublin, where they were both amateur singers.

== Work with Enya ==
Roma and Nicky Ryan met Enya in 1978; Nicky Ryan was managing Enya's family's band Clannad. Enya had just finished secondary school when Nicky Ryan rang her, asking if she would become a member of the group. The Ryans and Enya left Clannad several years later to focus on their own musical careers. Enya originally wrote instrumental melodies. Nicky said he found these melodies "very visual" and suited to film work, and began to write lyrics to them.

== Loxian language ==
In 2005, Ryan revealed her creation of a new language, known as Loxian, in Enya's album Amarantine. It was inspired by J.R.R. Tolkien's Elvish language. This language can be heard on three tracks from "Amarantine": "Less Than a Pearl", "The River Sings" and "Water Shows the Hidden Heart". Enya has mentioned in interviews that Ryan developed Loxian while writing lyrics for the track "Water Shows the Hidden Heart"; she and Enya had attempted to write lyrics for the track in Latin, Gaelic and English, but in the end found that they didn't really work for the song. The first Loxian phrase created by Ryan—"Syoombraaya"—is the title of that track ("Water Shows the Hidden Heart").

Loxian was used again in Enya's eighth studio album, Dark Sky Island, released on 20 November 2015, on the songs "The Forge of the Angels" and "The Loxian Gates". These songs focus on the otherworldly and futuristic tales Ryan uses Loxian for.

== Solo work ==
Ryan has undertaken several projects in addition to her contributions to Enya, including a book describing the Loxian language called Water Shows the Hidden Heart. The book also contains poetry and stories written by Ryan. "Water Shows the Hidden Heart" was released in two editions: the first edition as a standalone item, shortly after the release of Amarantine in 2005. The first edition features a short introduction by Enya. The second edition was included on the Deluxe Collector's Edition of Amarantine boxed set in early 2006. It omitted Enya's introduction and added colour images, as well as containing a different selection of Ryan's poetry. Neither version is in print.

On 1 September 2017 Ryan published two books of poetry, Islands No 2&3: Dark Sky Islands and Little Histories and The Messenger's Origin.

== The Loxian Games and the Unity forum ==
Ryan has been the coordinator of two on-line competitions at Enya's official website, enya.com—the First and Second Loxian Games, which have both been completed. Ryan announced the games on the official website in August 2008; the first games began on 1 September 2008 and the second games in September of the following year. The winners for both games had been announced on the official forum, unity.enya.com. Enya announced the last winners of the games in a video message from 2017.

== Personal life ==
Ryan was married to Dublin-born producer Nicky Ryan until his death in September 2025. The couple had two daughters, who contributed artwork to Amarantine. Ryan remains close to Enya, having worked on her lyrics, and resided together at their previous home in Artane for the first six years of Enya's solo career in the 1980s.

One of Ryan's sisters is the author and actress Michèle Forbes. Ryan's sister Michèle (also spelled Michelle) has occasionally been involved with the Enya project, conducting the sole interview that took place inside Enya's castle.

== Discography ==
- 1985 – The Frog Prince – The Original Soundtrack Recording — Enya and other artists – (title track only)
- 1987 – Enya — Enya
- 1988 – Watermark — Enya
- 1991 – Shepherd Moons — Enya
- 1995 – The Memory of Trees — Enya
- 1997 – Paint the Sky with Stars — Enya
- 1997 – A Box of Dreams — Enya
- 2000 – A Day Without Rain — Enya
- 2001 – Calmi Cuori Appassionati – Themes from Calmi Cuori Appassionati – (soundtrack) — Enya
- 2001 – The Lord of the Rings: The Fellowship of the Ring – Original Motion Picture Soundtrack — Howard Shore – (two tracks only: "Aníron" and "May It Be")
- 2002 – Only Time: The Collection — Enya
- 2005 – Amarantine — Enya
- 2006 – Sounds of the Season: The Enya Collection — Enya
- 2008 – And Winter Came... — Enya
- 2009 – The Very Best of Enya — Enya
- 2015 – Dark Sky Island — Enya
