= Enya =

Irish singer (born 1961)

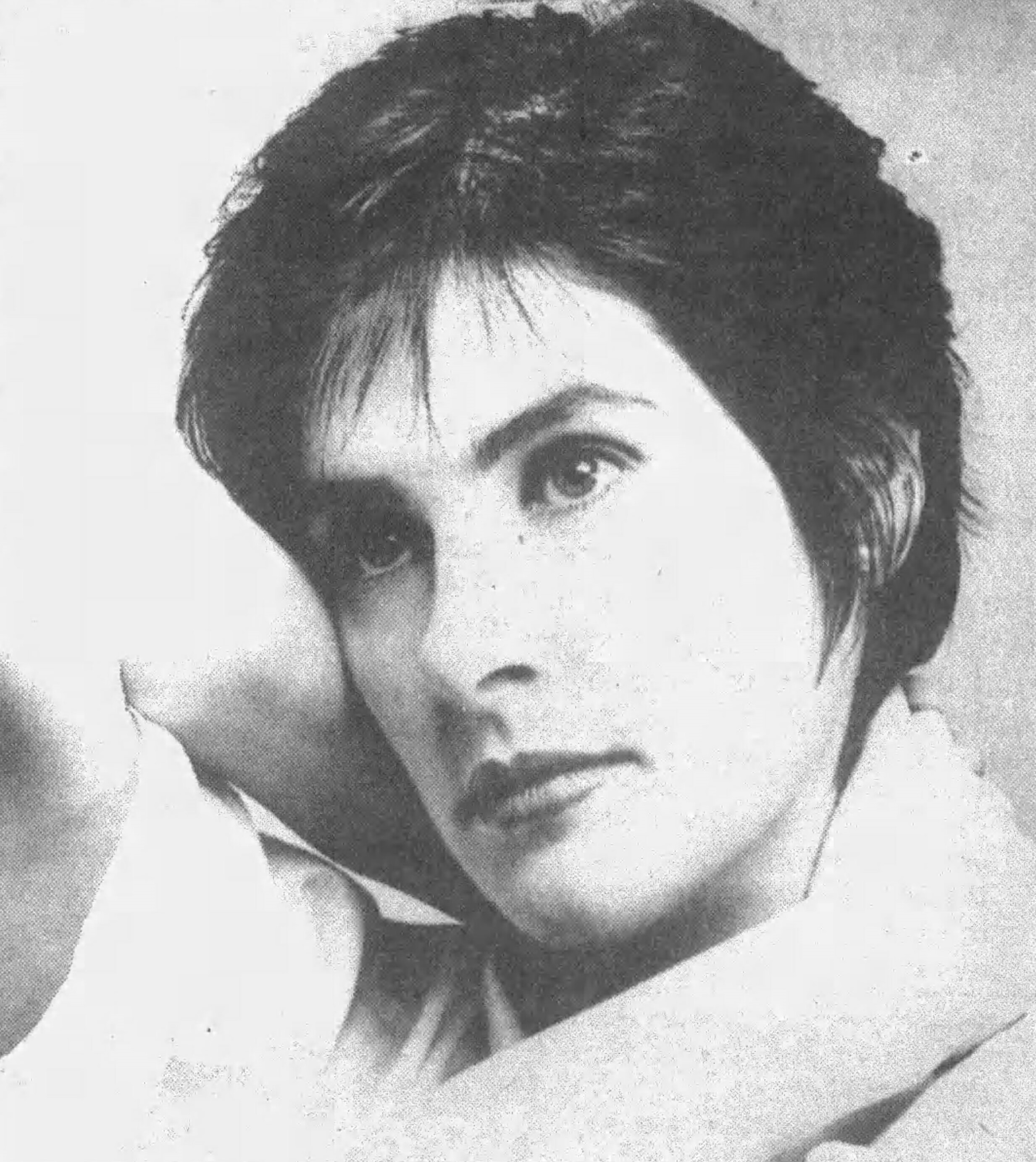
- Enya in 1988

Background information
- Also known as: Eithne Patricia Brennan; Eithne Ní Bhraonáin; Enya Patricia Brennan
- Born: Eithne Pádraigín Ní Bhraonáin; 17 May 1961 (age 65); Dore, Gweedore, County Donegal, Ireland
- Genres: New-age (Note: Enya has disavowed her music being labelled as new-age); Celtic; world; ambient; Celtic fusion
- Occupations: Singer; composer
- Instruments: Vocals; piano; keyboards; synthesisers; saxophone
- Years active: 1980–present
- Labels: BBC; Atlantic; Geffen; WEA; Reprise; Warner
- Awards: (Full list here)
- Website: enya.com

Eithne Pádraigín Ní Bhraonáin (anglicised as Enya Patricia Brennan) (Irish pronunciation: [ˈɛnʲə pˠaːdʲɾʲəɟiːnʲ n̠ʲiː ˈwɾˠiːnˠaːnʲ]) (born 17 May 1961), known as Enya, is an Irish singer and composer. With an estimated equivalent of more than 80 million albums sold, she is one of the world's best-selling music artists. Enya is the best-selling Irish solo artist, and the second-best-selling music act from Ireland overall, after the band U2. Enya's music is widely recognised for its multi-layered use of her own vocals and instrumentation, lengthened reverb, and interwoven elements of Celtic music.

Raised in the Irish-speaking region of Gweedore, Enya began her musical career in 1980, playing alongside her family's Irish folk band, Clannad. She left Clannad in 1982 to pursue a solo career, working with the former Clannad manager and producer, Nicky Ryan, and his partner Roma Ryan as their lyricist. Enya composed the majority of the soundtrack for The Frog Prince (1985) and the soundtrack for the 1987 BBC documentary series The Celts. BBC Records released her debut album Enya.

Enya was signed to Warner Music UK, and the success of her second album Watermark (1988) propelled Enya to worldwide fame, primarily through the single "Orinoco Flow (Sail Away)". She released the multi-million-selling albums Shepherd Moons (1991), The Memory of Trees (1995), the box set A Box of Dreams, first compilation album Paint the Sky with Stars (both released in 1997) and A Day Without Rain (2000). Sales of the 2000 album and its lead single, "Only Time", surged in the United States, following its use in media coverage of the 9/11 attacks. Enya's subsequent releases include Amarantine (2005), And Winter Came... (2008), the compilation album The Very Best of Enya (2009), and Dark Sky Island (2015).

Enya's accolades include four Grammy Awards and six World Music Awards. She is the most-nominated female Irish artist at the BRIT Awards, with four nominations. "May It Be", her composition from the soundtrack of The Lord of the Rings: The Fellowship of the Ring (2001), received a nomination for an Academy Award for Best Original Song. In 2025, Enya received the RTÉ Choice Music Prize's Classic Irish Album award for her 1988 breakthrough album, Watermark.

== Early life and family ==
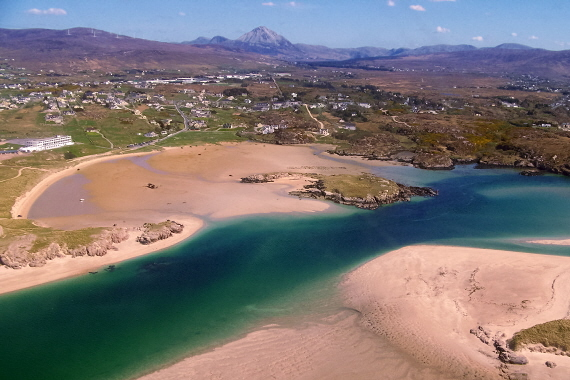
Enya's home area of Gweedore, pictured from above in 2008

Eithne Pádraigín Ní Bhraonáin was born on 17 May 1961 in Dore, Gaoth Dobhair (anglicised as Gweedore) in County Donegal, north-west of Ireland. She is the sixth of nine children in the Brennan family of musicians, born to Máire "Baba" and Leopold "Leo" Brennan.

Enya's mother Baba (née Máire Ní Dugáin), now retired, was a teacher and amateur musician. She was born to Aodh Ó Dugain (Hugh Duggan) and Máire Duggan (née Gillespie). They both taught at Pobalscoil Ghaoth Dobhair. Ó Dugain was the founder of the local theatre company, Amharclann Ghaoth Dobhair (the Gweedore Theatre) and its founding acting troupe, Aisteoirí Ghaoth Dobhair.

Enya's father Leo was born in Sligo. He became the leader of an Irish showband named the Slieve Foy. His parents, Harry Harden and Bessie Mina Harden, were both born in England, and later lodged in Ireland. Harry Harden was a pianist, entertainer, and bazaar manager. He died onstage of a heart attack. Bessie Mina Harden was a professional singer and percussionist. She was previously married to a Thomas Brennan. Despite the administrative error, Leo ultimately kept the Brennan surname.

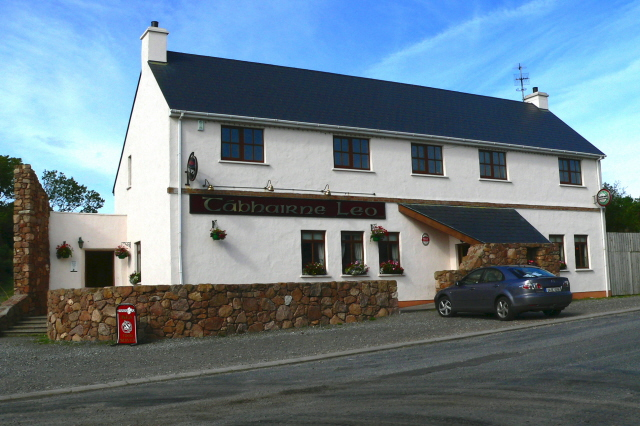
Leo's Tavern, the pub owned by Enya's family, currently under the proprietorship of her younger brother Bartley.

Enya's parents married in 1952, shortly after finding out they were expecting their first daughter, Moya. In 1968, the couple took ownership of a pub in Meenaleck, County Donegal, naming it Leo's Tavern.

The siblings grew up amidst the Troubles. When Enya's family visited shops in Derry for instance, "you'd be checked by people standing with guns". Out of political concern being from the Gaeltacht, they had to avoid speaking Irish in Derry, whereas they saw no problems with it as children.

With Gweedore being a rural area, Enya's family had many cats, 12 at one point. This has become a frequent media misconception that multiple cats reside at her castle.

=== Musical involvement and education ===
Enya took part in her first singing competitions at the annual Feis Ceoil music festival between the ages of three and five years old. At three-and-a-half years of age, she played and sang as the character Little Red Riding Hood on stage at Amharclann Ghaoth Dobhair. At the age of four, Enya began piano lessons and learnt English throughout primary school. Enya's early musical background involved singing in her mother's choir (Cór Mhuire) at St Mary's church in Derrybeg. The siblings' father played the accordion and big band style on the saxophone, particularly Glenn Miller–type songs. The siblings frequented Derry to attend James MacCafferty's music school.

From the age of 11, Enya attended a convent boarding school at Loreto College (now Loreto Community School) in Milford, paid for by her grandfather. Her sisters attended different schools. Boarding at Loreto gave Enya a taste for classical music, art, Latin, and watercolour painting.

== Career ==
=== 1980–1982: Clannad ===
Enya originally intended to go to university after college to obtain a music degree. She instead finished college early, and joined the family band Clannad, albeit reluctantly. In 1970, several members of Enya's family formed Clannad, a Celtic folk band. Clannad hired Nicky Ryan as their manager, sound engineer, and producer, and Ryan's then girlfriend Roma as tour manager and administrator. In 1980, Enya accepted Nicky Ryan's invitation to play alongside Clannad, with him having wanted to expand their sound with keyboards and a soprano vocalist. Enya was also playing the saxophone during the time they toured, but mentioned stopping for a while, concerned about it affecting her throat for singing.

Enya performed an uncredited role on Clannad's sixth album, Crann Úll (1980), with a line-up of her eldest siblings Moya, Pól, and Ciarán Brennan, and twin uncles Noel and Pádraig Duggan. She features in their follow-up, Fuaim (1982), singing lead vocals on the song "An tÚll" (Irish for "The Apple"). The band toured Europe, seeing Enya join the band for performances in Germany, the Netherlands, and Switzerland. They also played across Ireland including the Lisdoonvarna Music Festival and Castlebar's Occasion at the Castle.

The membership status of Enya in Clannad is a matter of some dispute. In a 2007 interview, Enya's brother Ciarán mentioned that Enya was a "hired hand" and not a full member. In a BBC Radio Ulster interview with Moya in late 2023, she also said that Enya was considered a hired hand with Clannad. Nicky Ryan also said it was not his intention to make Enya a permanent member, as she was "fiercely independent [...] intent on playing her own music. She was just not sure of how to go about it."

In a 1991 interview, Enya herself said that she "wouldn't call what happened a 'split' and that she "wasn't really a full member of Clannad". Enya added "I always felt I was just passing through [...] I was 18 and had studied music and was really feeling my way, trying to see what I could do." Nicky discussed the idea of layering vocals to create a "choir of one" with Enya, a concept inspired by Phil Spector's Wall of Sound technique that had interested them both.

During a Clannad tour in Switzerland in 1982, Nicky called for a band meeting to address internal issues that had arisen, which he put down to alcoholism from one or two members. He recalled that "It was short and only required a vote, I was a minority of one and lost. Roma and I were out. This left the question of what happened with Enya. I decided to stand back and say nothing." Enya chose to leave with the Ryans and pursue a solo career, having felt confined in the group and disliking being "somebody in the background". In an extended interview from 1989, Enya said "I wasn't composing [the music], I was just there, you know."

The split caused some friction between the parties but, in time, the siblings settled their differences. Ciarán conversed with Nicky Ryan around 2006 at Enya's Halloween party, interested in recording at Aigle with Enya, but Ryan suggested that it would not be happening. Moya had praised Enya for her hard work going solo, also supposing some musical foundations were built from her short time with the band. Pól comforted Enya at Moya's funeral in 2026.

=== 1982–1986: Early solo career ===
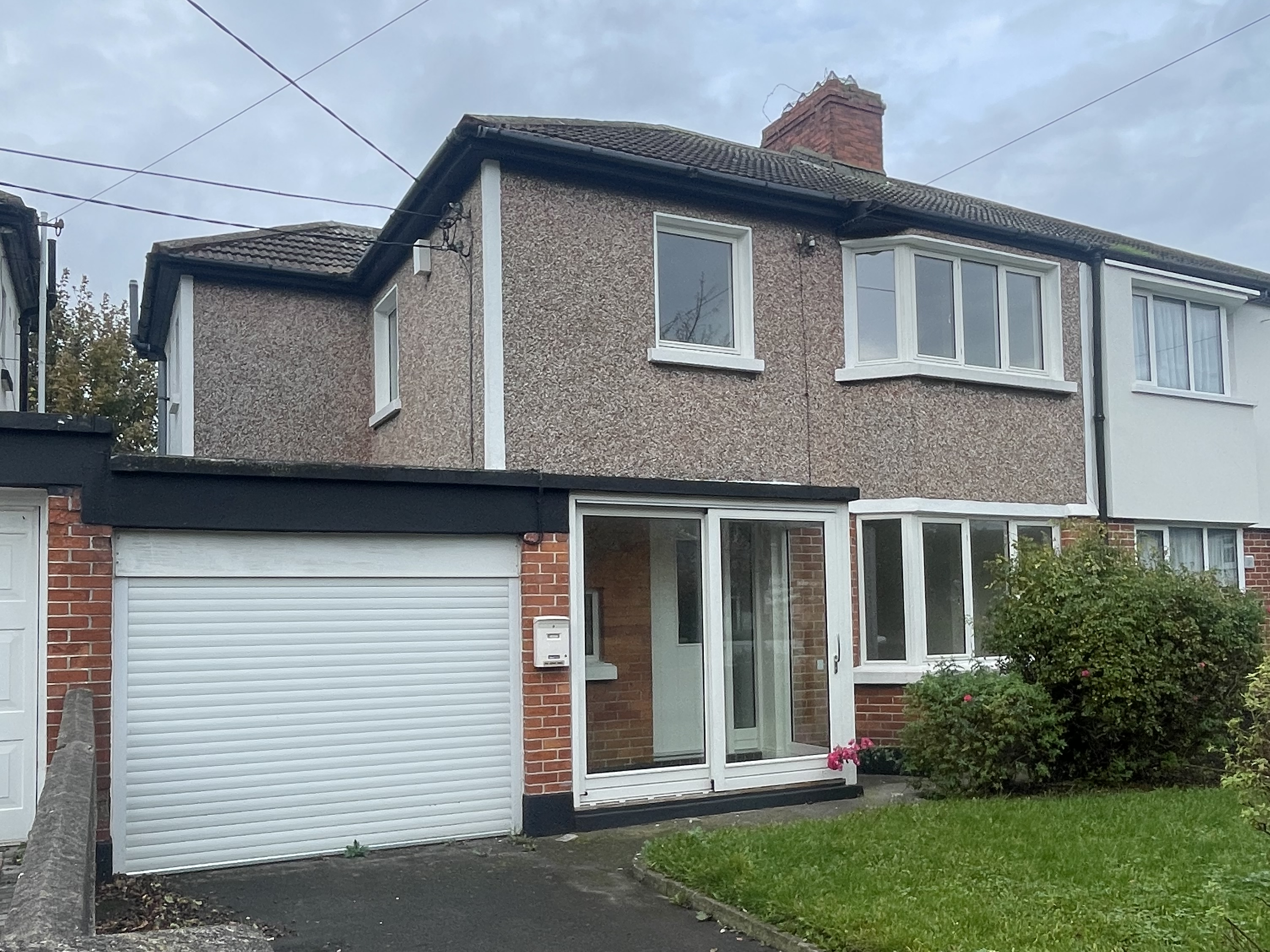
The semi which was the Ryans' former family home in Artane, where Enya resided. The property housed the original Aigle Studio from 1982 until the mid-1990s.

Enya moved in with the Ryans at their semi-detached home in Artane, Dublin in 1982. Nicky suggested to Enya that either she return to Gweedore "with no particular definite future", or live with him and Roma and "see what happens, musically". After their bank denied them a loan, Enya reportedly sold her saxophone, which she had been learning to play at the time, and also gave piano lessons as a source of income. Nicky Ryan used what they could afford to build a recording facility, which became their studio.

Enya stated, following her departure from Clannad, "the fact is that I had become very friendly with Nicky and Roma. I trusted them [...] basically, I felt there was more there for me career-wise." The trio formed a musical and business partnership, with Nicky as Enya's producer and arranger and Roma as her lyricist. They called their company, of which each owned a third, Aigle Music. In the following two years, Enya developed her technique and composition by listening to recordings of her reciting pieces of classical music and repeated this process until she started to improvise sections and develop her own arrangements.

Following her departure from Clannad in 1982, Enya featured on tracks alongside several artists (credited as Eithne Ní Bhraonáin). Similarly, she was playing keyboards or singing backing vocals with Nicky Ryan as producer. She played the Prophet-5 synthesiser on the album Ceol Aduaidh, led by Mairéad Ní Mhaonaigh and Frankie Kennedy, who later formed Altan.

A song penned by Charlie McGettigan named "Bailieboro and Me" features Enya singing backing vocals, as well as credit for playing grand piano for the song.

Enya's first solo endeavours began around 1982–83, composing piano and synthesiser instrumentals. She released "An Ghaoth Ón Ghrian" (Irish for "The Solar Wind") and "Miss Clare Remembers", both recorded at Windmill Lane Studios in Dublin and released on Touch Travel (1984), a limited-release cassette compilation of music from various artists on the UK Touch label. After several months of preparation, Enya's first live solo performance took place at the National Stadium in Dublin on 23 September 1983, and was televised for RTÉ's music show Festival Folk. Niall Morris, a young musician who worked with her during this time, assisted Enya in the production of a demo tape, adding additional keyboards to her compositions.

Roma thought the music would suit accompanying visuals and sent it to various film producers. Among them was David Puttnam, after Roma had read an interview where he stated a particular interest in strong melodies. Puttnam liked the tape and offered Enya to compose the soundtrack to the upcoming romantic comedy film, The Frog Prince (1985), directed by Brian Gilbert. Enya scored nine pieces for the soundtrack. However, Enya's instrumental pieces for the film were rearranged and orchestrated by Richard Myhill. The film editor Jim Clark said the rearrangements were necessary as Enya found it difficult to compose to picture. Enya's two songs with vocals were not in the film but on the soundtrack album: "The Frog Prince" and "Dreams". The melodies are present throughout the film soundtrack. The words to "Dreams" were penned by Charlie McGettigan.

Released in 1985, the Frog Prince OST is the first commercial release to credit her as "Enya". The spelling as "Enya" for her began in 1983. Nicky Ryan suggested this phonetic spelling of her name, with the likeliness that Eithne would be mispronounced by many non-Irish speakers. Enya looked back at her composition work on the film as a good career move, but a disappointing one as "we weren't part of it at the end." Enya also sang on three tracks on the album Ordinary Man (1985) by Christy Moore. Enya's earliest English-language interviews as a solo artist began in 1986. Whatever direction her music would take, she believed in being "a true Celt at heart", stating that "any music I write would be Celtic music, whether it be a pop song or a classical piece."

=== 1985–1989: The Celts and Watermark ===
In 1985, producer Tony McAuley asked Enya to contribute a track for the six-part BBC television documentary series The Celts. She had already written a Celtic-influenced song called "March of the Celts", and Nicky Ryan submitted it to the project. Each episode was to feature a different composer at first, but director David Richardson liked her track so much that he had Enya score the entire series. Enya recorded 72 minutes of music at Aigle Studio and the BBC studios in Wood Lane, London, without recording to picture. She was required to portray certain themes and ideas requested by producers In contrast with The Frog Prince, Enya worked with little interference, granting her freedom to establish the sound that she would adopt throughout her career as Enya signified by layered vocals, keyboard-oriented music, and percussion with elements of Celtic, classical, church, and folk music.

In March 1987, two months before The Celts aired, a 40-minute selection of Enya's score was released as her debut solo album, Enya, initially by Atlantic Records in the United States in 1986, then in 1987 under BBC Records in the United Kingdom. Atlantic promoted the album with a new-age imprint on the packaging, which Nicky thought was "a cowardly thing for them to do". The album gained enough public attention to reach number 8 on the Irish Albums Chart and number 69 on the UK Albums Chart. "I Want Tomorrow" was released as Enya's first single. "Boadicea" was later sampled by the Fugees on their 1996 song "Ready or Not", initially unauthorised. Enya's legal team took action and the group subsequently credited her; they paid a fee of approximately $3 million. Later in 1987, Enya appeared on Sinéad O'Connor's debut album The Lion and the Cobra, reciting Psalm 91 in Irish on the track "Never Get Old". Enya posted her spoken words of the psalm as her tribute message to O'Connor, following the latter's death in July 2023.

Several weeks after the release, Enya secured a recording contract with Warner Music UK after Rob Dickins, the label's chairman and a fan of Clannad, took a liking to Enya and found himself playing it "every night before I went to bed." He later met Enya and the Ryans at a chance meeting at the IRMA award ceremony in Dublin, where he learned that Enya had entered negotiations with a rival label. Dickins seized the opportunity and signed her, in doing so granting her wish to write and record with artistic freedom, minimal interference from the label, and without set deadlines to finish albums. Dickins said: "Sometimes you sign an act to make money, and sometimes you sign an act to make music. This was the latter [...] I just wanted to be involved with this music." Enya left Atlantic and signed with the Warner-led Geffen Records to handle her American distribution.

With the greenlight to produce a new album, Enya recorded Watermark from June 1987 to April 1988. It was initially recorded in analogue at Aigle before Dickins requested to have it re-recorded digitally at Orinoco Studios in Bermondsey, London.

Watermark was released in September 1988 and became an unexpected hit, reaching number 5 in the United Kingdom and number 25 on the Billboard 200 in the United States following its release there in January 1989. Its lead single, "Orinoco Flow", was the last song written for the album. It was not intended to be a single at first, but Enya and the Ryans chose it after Dickins jokingly asked for a single. Both Dickins and engineer Ross Cullum are referenced in the song's lyrics. "Orinoco Flow" became an international Top 10 hit, and number 1 in the United Kingdom for three consecutive weeks. The song brought new-age music to the mainstream market in 1990s America. The new-found success propelled Enya to international fame and she received endorsement deals and offers to use her music for TV and film. She spent a year traveling worldwide to promote the album which increased her exposure through interviews, appearances, and live performances.

In a 1989 article, an interview excerpt featured Enya reflecting on being female in the music industry and how lack of creative control would have been an additional difficulty for her. "Girls in this business have a hard time. But I'm lucky because I write and sing my own songs. When I hear of people like Kylie and Sabrina who just go into studios, do a vocal and allow people to do everything else, well then I'm a bit mystified. I could never do that myself."

Enya resided with the Ryans until 1989, when she was able to buy a penthouse apartment in Killiney.

=== 1989–1998: Shepherd Moons, The Memory of Trees and Paint the Sky with Stars ===
After promoting Watermark, Enya started work on her next album, Shepherd Moons. She found that the success of Watermark added a considerable amount of pressure when it came to writing new songs, stating, "I kept thinking, "Would this have gone on Watermark? Is it as good?" Eventually I had to forget about this and start on a blank canvas and just really go with what felt right." Roma Ryan wrote songs based on several ideas, including diary entries from Enya, the Blitz in London, and her grandparents. Shepherd Moons was released in November 1991, her first album released under Warner-led Reprise Records in the United States. It became a greater commercial success than Watermark, reaching number 1 in the UK for one week and number 17 in the United States. "Caribbean Blue", its lead single, charted at number 13 in the United Kingdom.

In 1991, Warner Music released a collection of five Enya music videos as Moonshadows for home video. In 1993 Enya won her first Grammy Award in the Best New Age Album category for Shepherd Moons. Soon after, Enya and Nicky entered discussions with Industrial Light & Magic, founded by George Lucas, regarding an elaborate stage lighting system for a proposed concert tour, but nothing resulted from those discussions. In November 1992, Warner obtained the rights to Enya and re-released the album as The Celts with new artwork. It surpassed its initial sale performance, reaching number 10 in the UK.

After travelling worldwide to promote Shepherd Moons, Enya started to write and record her fourth album, The Memory of Trees. By this time, the Ryans had moved to the southern Dublin suburb of Killiney, and a new Aigle Studio had been built alongside their home, with new recording facilities which eliminated the need to go to London to finish mixing the album. The new album was released in November 1995 and peaked at number 5 in the UK and number 9 in the US, where it sold more than three million copies. Its lead single, "Anywhere Is", reached number 7 in the UK. The second, "On My Way Home", reached number 26 in the UK. In late 1994, Enya put out an extended play of Christmas music titled The Christmas EP. Enya was offered the opportunity to compose the film score for Titanic but declined as it would be a collaboration, rather than her composing and singing. Enya's initial recording of "Oíche Chiúin", an Irish-language version of "Silent Night", appeared on the charity album A Very Special Christmas 3, released in benefit of the Special Olympics in October 1997.

In early 1997, Enya began to select tracks for her first compilation album, "trying to select the obvious ones, the hits, and others." She chose to work on the collection following the promotional tour for The Memory of Trees as she felt it was the right time in her career, and that her contract with WEA required her to release a "best of" album. The set, named Paint the Sky with Stars: The Best of Enya, featured two new tracks, "Paint the Sky with Stars" and "Only If...". Released in November 1997, the album was a worldwide commercial success, reaching number 4 in the UK and number 30 in the US, going on to sell more than four million copies. "Only If..." was released as a single in 1997. Enya described the album as "like a musical diary... each melody has a little story and I live through that whole story from the beginning... your mind goes back to that day and what you were thinking."

=== 1998–2007: A Day Without Rain and Amarantine ===
In 1998, Enya, Roma and Nicky Ryan received the Ivor Novello award for International Achievement. That year, Enya started work on her fifth album, A Day Without Rain. Enya incorporated greater use of synthesised strings in her compositions, something that was not a conscious decision at first, but the trio agreed that it complemented the songs written. The album was released in November 2000 and reached number 6 in the UK and an initial peak of number 17 in the US. In the aftermath of the 9/11 attacks, US sales of the album and its lead single "Only Time" surged after the song was widely used during radio and television coverage after a stockbroker created a tribute video featuring Enya's song. Enya released a maxi-single containing the original and a pop remix of "Only Time" in November 2001, and donated its proceeds in aid of the Widows' and Children's Fund of the Uniformed Firefighters Association (UFA). The song topped the Billboard Hot Adult Contemporary Tracks chart and went to number 10 on the Hot 100 singles, Enya's highest charting US single to date.

In 2001, Enya agreed to write and perform on two tracks for the soundtrack of The Lord of the Rings: The Fellowship of the Ring (2001) at the request of director Peter Jackson. Composer Howard Shore "imagined her voice" as he wrote the film's score, making an uncommon exception to include another artist in one of his soundtracks. After flying to New Zealand to watch a rough cut of the film, Enya returned to Ireland and composed "Aníron" (the theme for Aragorn and Arwen), with lyrics by Roma in J. R. R. Tolkien's fictional Elvish language Sindarin, and "May It Be", sung in English and another Tolkien language, Quenya. Shore then based his orchestrations around Enya's recorded vocals and themes to create "a seamless sound". In 2002, Enya released "May It Be" as a single which earned her an Academy Award nomination for Best Original Song. She performed the song live with an orchestra at the 74th Academy Awards ceremony in March 2002, and later cited the moment as a career highlight. Her two songs for the film were recorded at Abbey Road Studios. Enya undertook additional projects there in 2001 and 2002. The first was work on the soundtrack of the Japanese romantic film Calmi Cuori Appassionati (2001), which was subsequently released as Themes from Calmi Cuori Appassionati (2001). This release is formed of tracks spanning her career from Enya to A Day Without Rain with two B-sides. The album went to number 2 in Japan and became Enya's second album to sell one million copies in the country.

In September 2003, Enya returned to the studio to start work on Amarantine, her sixth album. Roma said the title means "everlasting". The album marks the first instance of Enya singing in Loxian, a fictional language created by Roma that came about when Enya was working on "Water Shows the Hidden Heart". After attempts to sing in English, Irish, and Latin did not fit, Roma suggested curating a new language. Enya also sang "Less Than a Pearl" and "The River Sings" in Loxian. Roma worked on the language further, creating a "culture and history" behind it surrounding the Loxian people who are on another planet, questioning the existence of life outside of Earth. "Sumiregusa (Wild Violet)" is sung in Japanese. Amarantine was a global success, reaching number 6 on the Billboard 200 and number 8 in the UK. Enya dedicated the album to BBC producer Tony McAuley who had commissioned Enya to write the soundtrack to The Celts, following his death in 2003. The lead single, "Amarantine", was released in December 2005. In 2004, Enya had another significant "Boadicea" sampling request from Diddy, for the song "I Don't Wanna Know" performed by Mario Winans. Enya was glad to have been asked; "immediately we said 'send the song' and it was a great song."

=== 2008–2017: And Winter Came... and Dark Sky Island ===
For her seventh album, And Winter Came... Enya wrote music with a combination of Christmas and wintertime themes. Initially, she intended to make a solely Christmas album, set for a release in late 2007, but the trio decided to produce a winter-themed album instead. The second promotional single of the album, "My! My! Time Flies!", is a tribute to the Irish guitarist Jimmy Faulkner. It incorporates a guitar solo performed by Pat Farrell, the first guitar solo on an Enya album since "I Want Tomorrow" from Enya. Upon its release in November 2008, And Winter Came... reached number 6 in the UK number 8 in the US and sold almost 3.5 million copies worldwide by 2011. After promoting And Winter Came, Enya took an extended break from writing and recording music. She spent her time resting, visiting family in Australia, and renovating her new home in the south of France. In March 2009, her first four albums were reissued in Japan in the Super High Material CD format with bonus tracks. Her second compilation album, The Very Best of Enya, was released in November 2009 and featured songs from 1986 to 2008, including a previously unreleased version of "Aníron" and a DVD of music videos.

In 2012, Enya returned to the studio to record her eighth album, Dark Sky Island. In 2013, "Only Time" was used in the "Epic Split" advertisement by Volvo Trucks starring Jean-Claude Van Damme, who does the splits while suspended between two lorries. As a result, Enya's song "Only Time" re-entered both the US Billboard 100 and UK Official Charts in November 2013. Dark Sky Island was announced on Enya's website on 15 September 2015. Upon the album's streaming release on 20 November 2015, a week before physical release, Dark Sky Island went to number 8 in the US, and number 4 in the UK album charts, which was Enya's highest charting album since Shepherd Moons went to number 1.

Enya completed a promotional tour of the UK, across Europe, the US, and Japan. In December 2016, Enya appeared on the Irish television show Christmas Carols from Cork, marking her first Irish television appearance in more than seven years.

=== 2019–2024: Musical anniversaries and re-releases ===
In 2020-21, Enya's music videos on YouTube underwent 4K/HD conversion: "Only Time", "Caribbean Blue", "Orinoco Flow", "The Celts" and "Anywhere Is".

In 2022, for Metro Boomin and the Weeknd's song "Creepin'" featuring samples from her 1986 track "Boadicea", Enya did not approve of the song to be released under the working title "IDWK". She approved of "Undecided," "Creepin'", "Don't Come Back to Me", "Better Off That Way" and "Wanna Let You Know". Metro said " 'Creepin' ' was the one [...] It ended up being a blessing because it's the best name for it." In December 2024, "Creepin'" won the BMI London Song of the Year, with Enya sharing the award.

In June 2023, Enya's 1997 compilation A Box of Dreams was re-issued on six vinyl LPs, featuring new liner notes. Nicky Ryan hinted at a "new album" as well as the possibility of a book based on the trio's thoughts regarding the Oceans tracks. Enya's note, in Irish, read "Beidh muid ag teacht le chéile gan mhoile", roughly translating to "We will meet again soon." Roma Ryan also updated the liner notes with several newer thoughts about the songs, constellations, and poetry. Alongside this, vinyl LPs of Watermark and a Dolby Atmos upmixed audio for "Orinoco Flow" were also released.

=== 2025–present: Later projects and acclaim ===
On 20 February 2025, Enya was announced as the winner of the RTÉ Choice Music Prize Classic Irish Album on the RTÉ Gold Breakfast Show, for her 1988 album Watermark. The Choice Music Prize awards evening took place on 6 March 2025. Enya was unavailable to attend so her speech was read on her behalf by Priscilla Kotey, managing director of Warner Music Ireland. On 15 March 2025, the BBC first broadcast Enya at the BBC, a compilation of Enya's performances and music videos from the beginning of her solo career in 1986 to her latest BBC interview in early 2016.

In November 2025, Théophile Naël won the Macau Grand Prix racing under the sponsorship of the KCMG Enya group by Pinnacle Motorsport. Along with Mari Boya, the team scored a 1-2 win at the motorsport event.

Enya's long term producer, Nicky Ryan, died at the age of 79 on 10 September 2025, announced on 11 September to Hotpress by his son-in law Daniel, on behalf of his widow Roma. The 2015 title track "Dark Sky Island" on the trio's final album together was played at Ryan's funeral along with other songs.

In early February 2026, Enya's song "Only Time" was featured in a PSA screening awareness advertisement/commercial for the Super Bowl LX.

On 16 June 2026, Enya's synthesiser work was focused on in an episode of a four-part radio documentary named Control on RTÉ 2FM.

== Artistry ==
=== Musical inspirations ===
Enya has cited her musical foundations as classical, church music, and "Irish reels and jigs". She is a particular fan of Sergei Rachmaninoff, a favourite composer of hers. Enya also mentioned in 1987 for Q that her roots could be Stravinsky, supported by her disdain of tradition and interest in musical innovation. She said silence is what she listens to most, besides her music.

During her time with Clannad, Enya chose to work with Nicky Ryan as the two shared an interest in vocal harmonies. Ryan, influenced by The Beach Boys and the "Wall of Sound" technique that Phil Spector pioneered, wanted to explore the idea of "the multi-vocals" for which her music became known. According to Enya, "Angeles" from Shepherd Moons has roughly 500 vocals recorded individually and layered.

=== Instruments ===
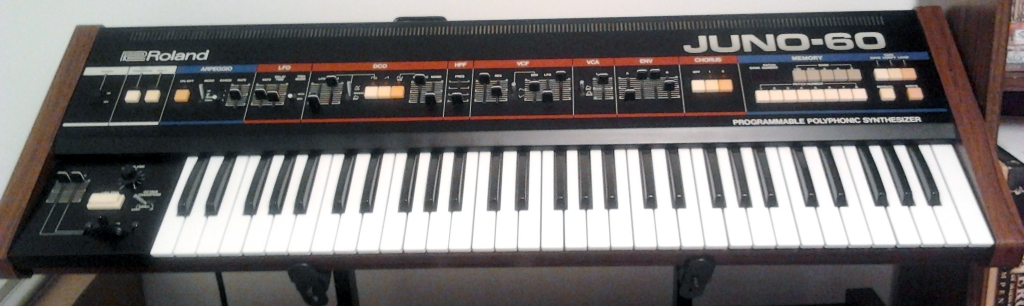
The Roland Juno-60, a favourite keyboard of Enya's. In 1989 she said "We wouldn't part with it for anything in the world".

Enya performs the vast majority of vocals (others by Nicky Ryan and Noel Bridgeman) and the majority of instruments in her songs. Several guest musicians have been credited over the years (covering some percussion, guitar, violin, uilleann pipes, cornet, and double bass).

Her early works, including Enya and Watermark, feature numerous keyboard synthesisers and samplers including the Yamaha KX88 Master, Yamaha DX7, Oberheim Matrix, Kurzweil K250, Fairlight III, E-mu Emulator II, Akai S900, PPG Wave Computer 360, Roland D-50 (with the "Pizzagogo" patch, famously used in "Orinoco Flow"), and the Roland Juno-60, the latter a particular favourite of hers. Her vast vocal range has been classified as mezzo-soprano.

Enya mentioned that in addition to piano, keyboards and vocals, she plays "the saxophone, suppose the accordion, the tin whistle, and I play cello" when asked in an AMA (Ask Me Anything) on Reddit in early 2016.

=== New-age assigning ===
Numerous critics and reviewers classify Enya's albums as new-age music and she has won four Grammy Awards for Best New Age Album. However, Enya does not consider her music as part of the genre; "the only way I can describe it [...] it's Enya music." Nicky Ryan commented on the new age designation: "Initially it was fine, but it's really not new age. Enya plays a whole lot of instruments, not just keyboards. Her melodies are strong and she sings a lot. So I can't see a comparison." In 1988, Enya is believed to have said about New Age music "it's air, thin air. It's a musical drug" and noted its often spineless nature, dissimilar to the approach taken in her own music. In an interview first published in 2017, Enya said that she 'felt that title [new-age] was given to any musician whom critics didn't know how to pigeonhole.'

The inspirations behind several of the visuals accompanying Enya's music originate from old artwork. The 1991 music video for "Caribbean Blue", and the 1995 album cover artwork for The Memory of Trees both feature adapted works from artist Maxfield Parrish. In the 1996 music video for "On My Way Home", scenes of girls lighting paper lanterns to hang in flowery foliage were inspired by John Singer Sargent's painting Carnation, Lily, Lily, Rose.

=== Languages ===
In addition to her native Irish, Enya has recorded songs in languages including English, French, Latin, Spanish, and Welsh. She has recorded music influenced by works from fantasy author J. R. R. Tolkien, including the instrumental "Lothlórien" from Shepherd Moons. For The Lord of the Rings: The Fellowship of the Ring, she sang "May It Be" in English and Tolkien's fictional language Quenya, and she sang "Aníron" in another of Tolkien's fictional languages, Sindarin. Amarantine and Dark Sky Island include songs sung in Loxian, a fictional language created by Roma Ryan, that has no official syntax. Its vocabulary was formed by Enya singing the song's notes to which Roma wrote their phonetic spelling.

=== Composition process ===
Enya adopted a composing and songwriting method that has deviated little throughout her career. At the start of the recording process for an album, she enters the studio, forgetting about her previous success, fame, and songs of hers that became hits. "If I did that," she said, "I'd have to call it a day." She then develops ideas on the piano, keeping note of any arrangement that can be worked on further.

During her time writing the music, as of 2008, Enya worked a five-day week, takes weekends off, and does not work on her music at home. This more relaxed style differs from the early years of her career, where she worked into the early hours and said that being stuck in the studio for months on end left her feeling like "a social zombie".

With Irish as her first language, Enya initially records her songs in Irish as she can express "feeling much more directly" in Irish than in English. After some time, Enya presented her ideas to Nicky to discuss what pieces work best, while Roma worked in parallel to devise lyrics for the songs. Enya considered "Fallen Embers" from A Day Without Rain a perfect example of the lyrics exactly reflecting the feeling. She realised her tendency to write "two or three songs" during the winter months, work on the arrangements and lyrics the following spring and summer, and then work on the next couple of songs when autumn arrives.

=== Live performances ===
Enya says that Warner Music and she "did not see eye to eye" initially as the label imagined her performing on stage "with a piano [..] maybe two or three synthesizer players and that's it". Enya also explained that the time put into her albums caused her to "run overtime", leaving little time to plan for other such projects. She also expressed the difficulty in recreating her studio-oriented sound for the stage. In 1996, Nicky Ryan said Enya had received and turned down an offer worth almost £500,000 to perform one concert in Japan. In 2016, Enya spoke about the prospect of a live concert when she revealed talks with the Ryans during her three-year break after And Winter Came... (2008) to perform a show at the Metropolitan Opera House in New York City that would be simulcast to cinemas worldwide. Before such an event could happen, Nicky suggested that she enter a studio and record "all the hits" live with an orchestra and choir to see how they would sound.

Enya has performed live and lip-synced vocals on various televised shows, including US shows The Tonight Show with Jay Leno and Larry King Live. In December 1995, she performed "Anywhere Is" at a Christmas concert at Vatican City with Pope John Paul II in attendance; he later met and thanked her for performing. In April 1996, Enya performed the same song during a surprise appearance at the 50th birthday celebration for Carl XVI Gustaf, the king of Sweden and a fan of Enya. In 1997, Enya participated in a live Christmas Eve broadcast in London and flew to County Donegal afterward to join her family for their annual Midnight Mass choral performance, in which she participates each year.

In March 2002, Enya performed "May It Be" with an orchestra at the year's Academy Awards/Oscars ceremony. Enya and her sisters performed together in July 2005 at the former St. Mary's Church in Derrybeg for the annual Earagail Arts Festival.

=== Aigle Studio ===
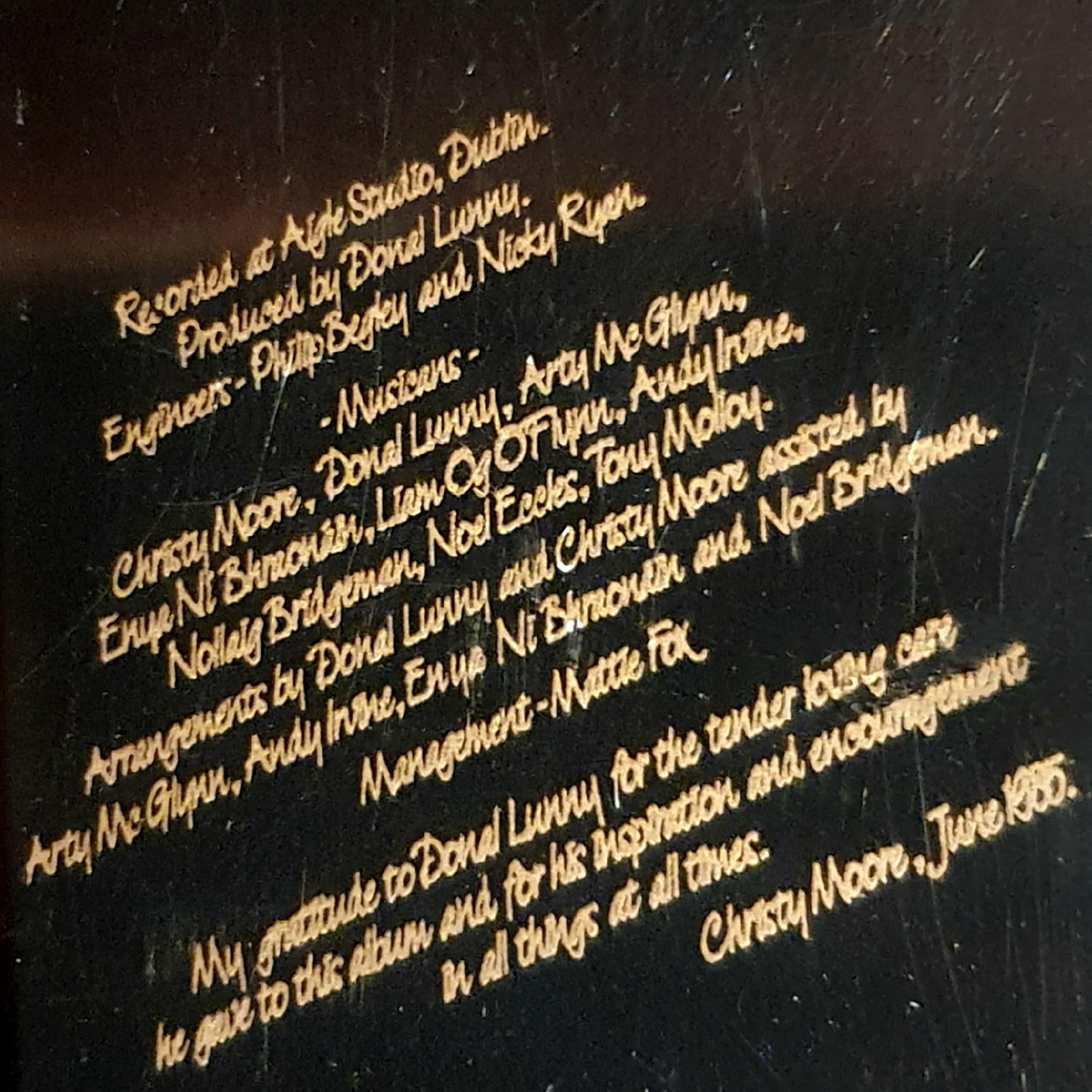
Album credits to 1985 album Ordinary Man, crediting Enya Ní Bhraonáin as the only female musician and assistant arranger.

The original studio was part of an extension to the Ryans' property in Artane, Dublin, formerly a Scout hut, which they named "Aigle Studio", after the French word for eagle. Enya and the Ryans rented the original Aigle Studio out to other musicians to help recuperate the costs. As well as Ordinary Man, the debut album of Altan was also recorded at Aigle.

Prior to Enya's 1995 album The Memory of Trees, the trio relocated Aigle Studio to their current studio in Treesdale, Killiney, Dublin. The Ryans also resided on the same property.

== Personal life ==
Known for maintaining a private lifestyle in addition to her music, Enya said in the mid-1990s, "The music is what sells. Not me, or what I stand for... that's the way I've always wanted it." Regarding perceptions of shyness, Enya said "in former times, I wasn't happy with that, but today I accept it and live my life after it. And I dare to express something private like emotions in my music and make it visible for the public."

Enya has never married nor had children of her own, but has many nieces and nephews. She is considered an aunt to the Ryans' two daughters, having shared their Artane home for almost a decade.

In 1991, Enya expressed concerns about marriage and being pursued for status rather than authentic love. During the 1990s, Enya was in a relationship, and press noted that a long-term relationship had ended in 1997. She had conflicting thoughts on starting a family. In 2005, she said "if I was married and had children, I wouldn't be at this point. And I never felt that it's the fault of the music that it is like that."

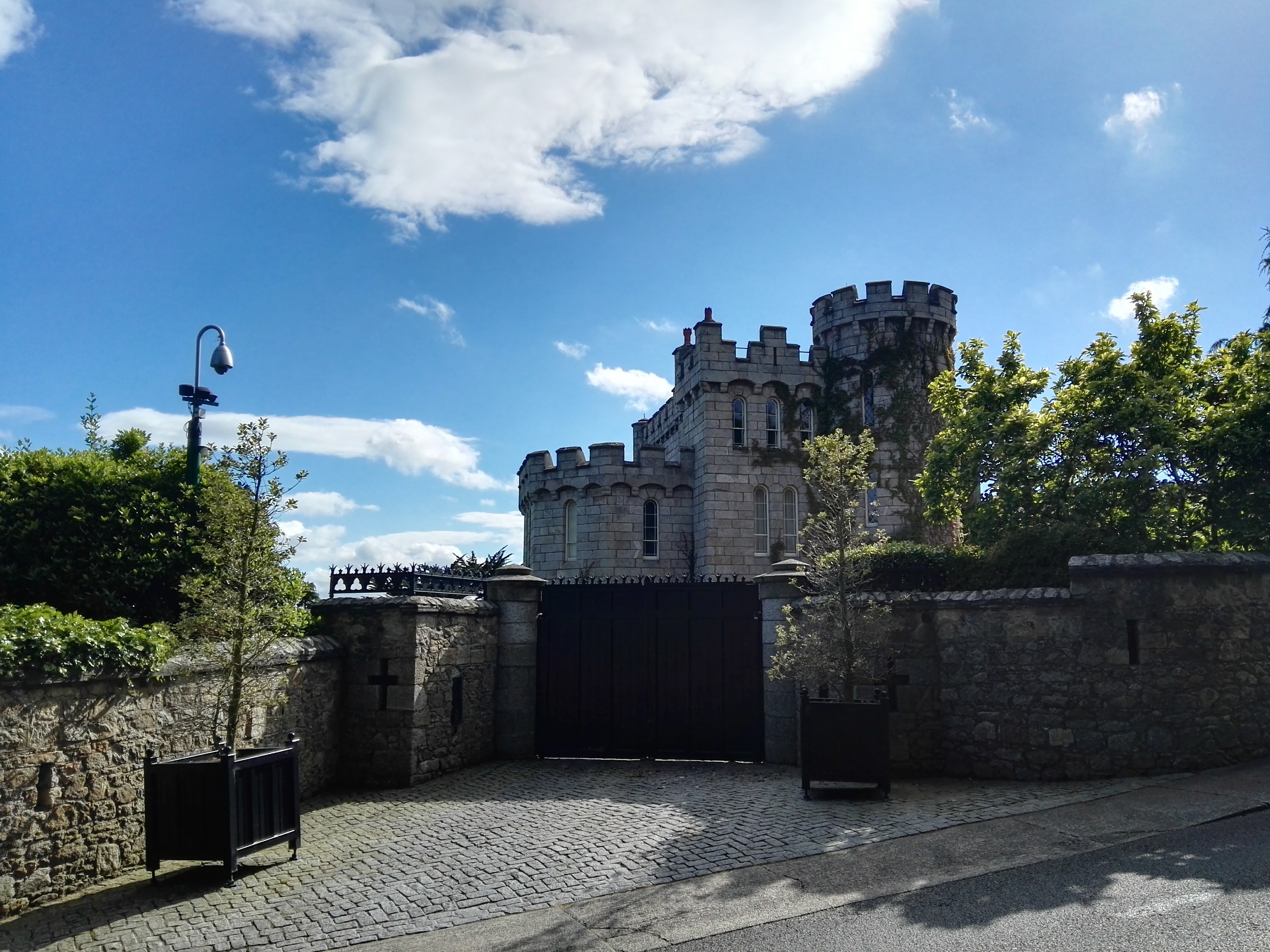
Manderley Castle, Enya's home since 1997

At an auction in 1997, Enya spent £2.5 million on a 157-year-old Victorian listed castellated mansion in Killiney. Formerly known as Victoria Castle and Ayesha Castle, Enya re-named it Manderley Castle after the house featured in Daphne du Maurier's 1938 novel Rebecca.

Identifying herself as "more spiritual than religious", Enya does not actively practice religion but finds reassurance in prayer, preferring to visit "churches when they're empty". Enya believes in guardian angels, suggested by her 1991 song "Angeles" and later supported by her response to a question asked of her in a 2017 interview.

Enya has briefly discussed her issues with depression once comparing interviews to seeing a psychiatrist. She has also mentioned dissociative experiences, which occurred following prolonged studio work and hectic promotional events.

In 1996, Enya was targeted by a stalker. In late 2005, her home was broken into twice. During one incident, two people attacked and tied up one of her housekeepers before stealing several items, and Enya spent several hours hiding in a panic room before calling the gardaí.

In July 1997, Enya was a passenger in a car crash in Dublin; she suffered head injuries which required 15 stitches. Enya described the experience as "traumatic and shocking" and said that "it took a lot of work to get my body back to singing".

In 2016, Enya's father Leo died at the age of 90. In December 2021, Enya's brother Leon died at the age of 62. She had described him as "my dearest and closest friend" and had gifted him a replacement wedding ring which was blessed before his death.

On 13 April 2026, Enya's sister Moya Brennan, eldest of the nine siblings, died at the age of 73, a decade after being diagnosed with pulmonary fibrosis.

Enya has cited her maternal grandparents as a strong source of support during her childhood. They died shortly before her career began, between the late 1970s to the first few years of the 1980s. In 2005, Enya said: "It was my grandparents who paid for my education; they were always around to advise me when I was young". Enya's songs "On Your Shore" and "Smaointe" (initially titled "Smaoitím", as a b-side to "Orinoco Flow") are dedicated to both of them.

Enya is a fan of the Police, and met Sting at the 74th Academy Awards in 2002. Their 1983 single "Every Breath You Take" is one of Enya's favourite songs. The first album she got was the band's 1979 album Reggatta de Blanc. Enya's own musical tastes are broad, citing various songs across the years that have "a strong melody," even if the genres are very different to her own, many being more mainstream.

Enya likes to paint, excelling in watercolours and landscape painting from a young age. However, she is reluctant to share her artwork publicly: "it shows too much of myself. If it is included in a song, it's less of a problem for me." In a Spanish interview in 2016, Enya mentioned that her painting is "something very personal. I share my thoughts when composing music but I prefer painting to stay private, at least for a few years."

== Recognition and legacy ==
Enya logo, designed by Laurence Dunmore; it has been in use since 1988.

=== Recognition ===
With an estimated equivalent of more than 80 million albums sold worldwide, Enya is one of the world's best-selling music artists, the best-selling Irish solo artist, and one of the most influential vocalists of all time. Enya has influenced a number of artists from several genres, including Aurora, Billie Eilish, FKA Twigs, Weyes Blood, Brandy, Adam Young, Grimes, Cynthia Erivo, Nicki Minaj, Lido Pimienta, and Nelly Furtado.

Furtado, then at the height of her career, mentioned Enya in a red carpet interview at the 2006 World Music Awards, saying "we [her team] would listen to Enya sometimes [...] some of the microphone, vocal sounds on my album are mimicking [...] the beautiful reverb and rich sounds that Enya has created [...] she's just one of those low-key artists that many people are inspired by, but in a quiet way." Lido Pimienta's album Caribenya, released 17 July 2026, is partly inspired by Enya and her way of life, regarding it as "really beautiful and aspirational". Furtado features on a song by Pimienta, named "Hoy por tí".

According to Billboard, Enya is one of the all-time highest-charted Irish acts on U.S. charts, and is one of the highest-certified music artists by album units in the U.S. Billboard's Mark Dezzani commented in 1997, that she popularized conventional pop melodies and ethereal ethnic music, while Audio magazine credited her for helping popularize the "New Celtic" sound. Enya was described by National Geographic's Ireland (2022) book, as the 'Queen of ambient Celtic lullabies.' In 2016, Sunday Times Rich List estimated her fortune at £91 million, making her part of their Top 50 millionaire musicians in Britain and Ireland.

=== Philanthropy ===
Diana, Princess of Wales was a fan of Enya. After the death of Princess Diana in August 1997, Enya was one of the artists who donated a track ("Watermark") to the tribute album, of which the proceeds went towards the Diana, Princess of Wales Memorial Fund.

Enya re-released her single "Only Time" in 2001, with all proceeds going to the UFA Widows' and Children's Fund, namely the 9/11 firefighters' families.

In 2008, Enya participated in a charity fundraiser with the United Way Taiwan (聯合勸募協會), donating NT$5 for every album sold through the event.

During the pandemic, Enya made a donation to a young music group in Cork, Ireland, which provided them with new percussion equipment and musical scholarships.

=== Legacy ===
In early 2025, Enya was announced as the winner of the 2025 RTÉ Choice Music Prize's Classic Irish Album award, for her 1988 album Watermark. The announcement was soon followed by a statement from the artist: "I am delighted to win the RTÉ Choice Music Classic Album Prize. Watermark has a special place in my heart—it was my second album and really launched my career internationally. It is wonderful that people are still discovering it today and it's an honour to be chosen for this prize recognising Irish music."

=== Honorary degrees and namings ===
In 1991, a minor planet first discovered in 1978, 6433 Enya, was named after her. In June 2007, she received an honorary PhD doctorate from the University of Galway, for her contributions to music. A month later, she received another honorary doctorate, a DLitt from Ulster University. In 2017, a newly discovered species of fish, Leporinus enyae, found in the Orinoco River drainage area, was named after Enya, in reference to her song, "Orinoco Flow".

== Discography ==
Studio albums

- Enya (1987) (1992 issue as The Celts)
- Watermark (1988)
- Shepherd Moons (1991)
- The Memory of Trees (1995)
- A Day Without Rain (2000)
- Amarantine (2005)
- And Winter Came... (2008)
- Dark Sky Island (2015)

== See also ==
- Orinoco Flow (Sail Away)
- Only Time
- Caribbean Blue
- List of artists who reached number one on the UK singles chart
- List of UK Albums Chart number ones of the 1990s
- List of highest-certified music artists in the United States
- List of Irish Grammy Award winners and nominees
- List of Irish musicians
- List of people from County Donegal
