= Tolkien's scripts =

Component of Tolkien's writings

Tolkien's scripts are the writing systems invented by the philologist and fantasy author J. R. R. Tolkien. The best-known are the Cirth runic script, based on real-life runic alphabets; Tolkien's first Elvish script, Sarati, supposedly created by Fëanor; and Tengwar, developed from Sarati, and used for languages including Sindarin as well as samples in English.

== Context ==
Being a skilled calligrapher, Tolkien invented scripts as well as languages. Some of his scripts were designed for use with his constructed languages, others for more practical ends. The Privata Kodo Skauta (Private Scout Code) from 1909 was designed to be used in his personal diary; it had both an alphabet and some whole-word ideographs. Late in his life, he created a New English Alphabet structured like Tengwar but written in characters resembling those of Latin and Greek.

In chronological order, Tolkien's Middle-earth scripts are:

1. Tengwar of Rúmil or Sarati
2. Gondolinic runes (Runes used in the city of Gondolin)
3. Valmaric script
4. Andyoqenya
5. Qenyatic
6. Tengwar of Fëanor
7. The Cirth of Daeron

In addition, there are some pre-Fëanorian variants including Falassin, Noriac, Banyaric, and Sinyatic, and some non-Middle-earth alphabets, in manuscripts from the 1920s, and a Goblin Alphabet used in The Father Christmas Letters.

== Cirth ==
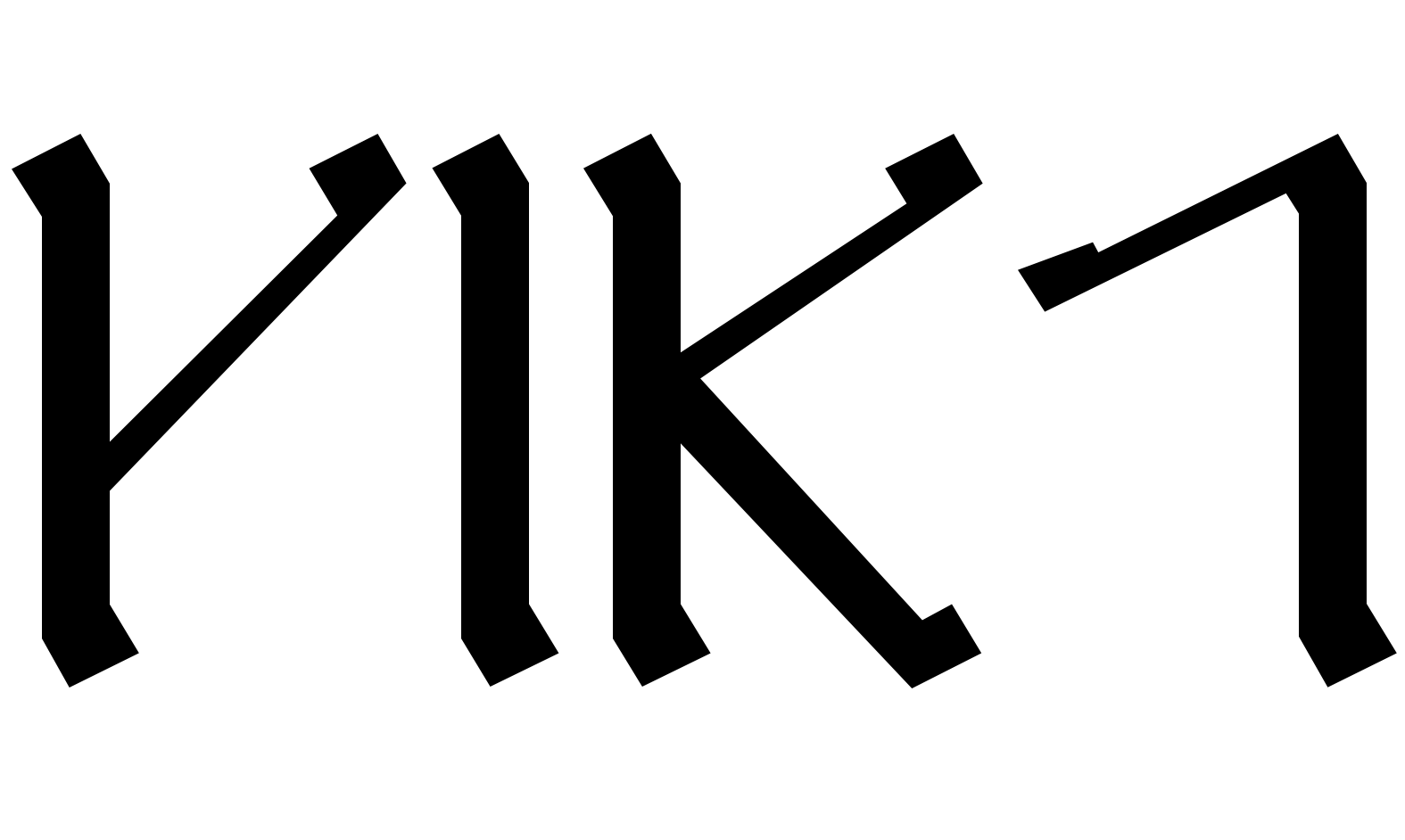
The word "Cirth" written using the Cirth

The Cirth, meaning "runes" is a semi‑artificial script, based on real‑life runic alphabets, invented by Tolkien for his constructed languages. Cirth is written with a capital letter when referring to the writing system; the letters themselves can be called cirth. In the fictional history of Middle-earth, the original Certhas was created by the Sindar or Grey Elves for their language, Sindarin. Its extension and elaboration was known as the Angerthas Daeron, as it was attributed to the Sinda Daeron, despite the fact that it was most probably arranged by the Noldor to represent the sounds of other languages like Quenya and Telerin. Although it was later largely replaced by the Tengwar, the Cirth was nonetheless adopted by the Dwarves to write down both their Khuzdul language and the languages of Men. The Cirth was adapted, in its oldest and simplest form, by various races including Men and even Orcs.

== Sarati ==
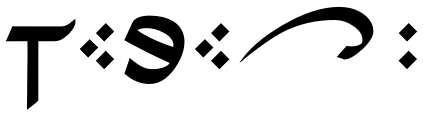
"Sarati" written in Sarati, from left to right, the letter "a" shown explicitly

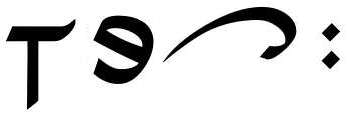
"Sarati" as usually written, in abugida style, with implicit letter "a" after unmarked consonants

The Sarati was Tolkien's first script for the Elves. It eventually developed into the Tengwar, supposedly created by Fëanor. Known as the first writing system of Arda, Sarati was invented by the Ñoldorin chronicler Rúmil of Valinor in the Valian Year of 1179. It was he "who first achieved fitting signs for the recording of speech and song". The writing system is officially called Sarati as each letter of the script represents a "sarat". However, Tolkien sometimes called the writing system "The Tengwar of Rúmil", tengwar meaning "letters" in the Elvish language Quenya. "Sarati" is the Quenya name for Rúmil's script.

Sarati was usually written top-to-bottom, but it could also be (and originally was) written left-to-right, or boustrophedon, going left and right alternately, like an ox pulling a plough back and forth in a field. When writing Quenya, the sign for "a" is usually omitted, as it is the most common vowel in Quenya. This makes Sarati an abugida with an inherent vowel of "a".

== Tengwar ==
"Tengwar" written using the Tengwar script in the Quenya mode

Within the fictional context of Middle-earth, the Tengwar were invented by the Elf Fëanor, and used first to write the Elven tongues Quenya and Telerin. Later a great number of languages of Middle-earth were written using the Tengwar, including Sindarin. Tolkien used Tengwar to write samples in English.

The inscription on the One Ring, a couplet in the Black Speech from the Ring Verse, was written in the Elvish Tengwar script, with heavy flourishes, as Mordor had no script of its own.
