= Umlaut (linguistics) =

Sound change of vowels assimilating to each other, especially in Germanic languages

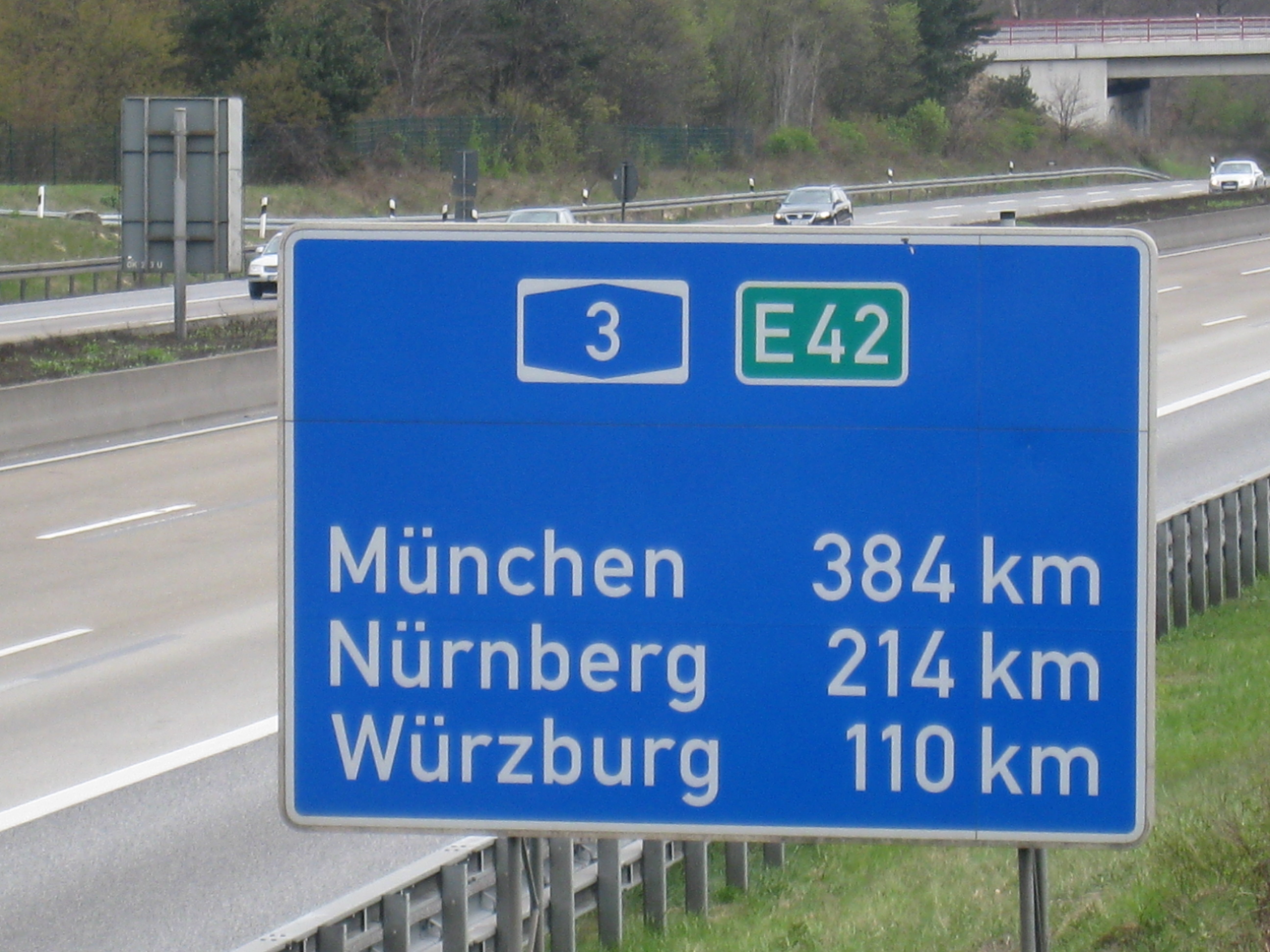
A road sign with three city names containing ü, Raststätte "Weiskirchen" on the A3 autobahn, south-east of Frankfurt-am-Main, Germany

In linguistics, umlaut (from German "sound alternation") is a sound change in which a vowel is pronounced more like a following vowel or semivowel.

== History ==
The term umlaut was originally coined by Jacob Grimm in connection with the study of Germanic languages, as umlaut had occurred prominently in many of their linguistic histories (see Germanic umlaut). While the common English plural is umlauts, the German plural is Umlaute.

== Description ==
Umlaut is a form of assimilation, the process of one speech sound becoming more similar to a nearby sound. Umlaut occurred in order to make words easier to pronounce. If a word has two vowels, one back in the mouth and the other forward, it takes more effort to pronounce than if those vowels were closer together. Thus, one way languages may change is that these two vowels get drawn closer together. The phenomenon is also known as vowel harmony, the complete or partial identity of vowels within a domain, typically a word.

For example, in Old High German, the word gast 'guest' had the plural form gesti 'guests': the plural ending -i caused the vowel in the stem to be a front vowel e. This vowel alternation remained in the language, so that present-day Standard German displays the forms Gast [gast] – Gäste [gɛstə], although the final front vowel has been reduced to the central schwa vowel.

== Types of umlaut ==
The most commonly seen types of umlaut are the following:

- Vowel raising, triggered by a following high vowel (often specifically a high front vowel such as /i/) as in Kannada.
- Vowel fronting, triggered by a following front vowel (often specifically a high front vowel such as /i/), as in German.
- Vowel lowering, triggered by a following non-high vowel (often specifically a low vowel such as /a/), as in Spoken Tamil.
- Vowel rounding, triggered by a following rounded vowel (often specifically a high rounded vowel such as /u/), as in Icelandic.

All of these processes occurred in the history of the Germanic languages; see Germanic umlaut for more details. I-mutation is the most prominent of the processes, to the extent that it is often referred to simply as "umlaut".

Similar processes also occurred in the history of the Celtic languages, especially Old Irish. In this context, these processes are often referred to as affection.

Vowel-raising umlaut occurred in the history of many of the Romance languages, in the study of which it is normally termed metaphony.

== See also ==
- Umlaut (diacritic)
- Diaeresis (diacritic)
- Vowel harmony
- Metaphony
- Germanic umlaut
- I-mutation
- Two dots (disambiguation)
- Ablaut
