= David Salo =

American linguist

David I. Salo
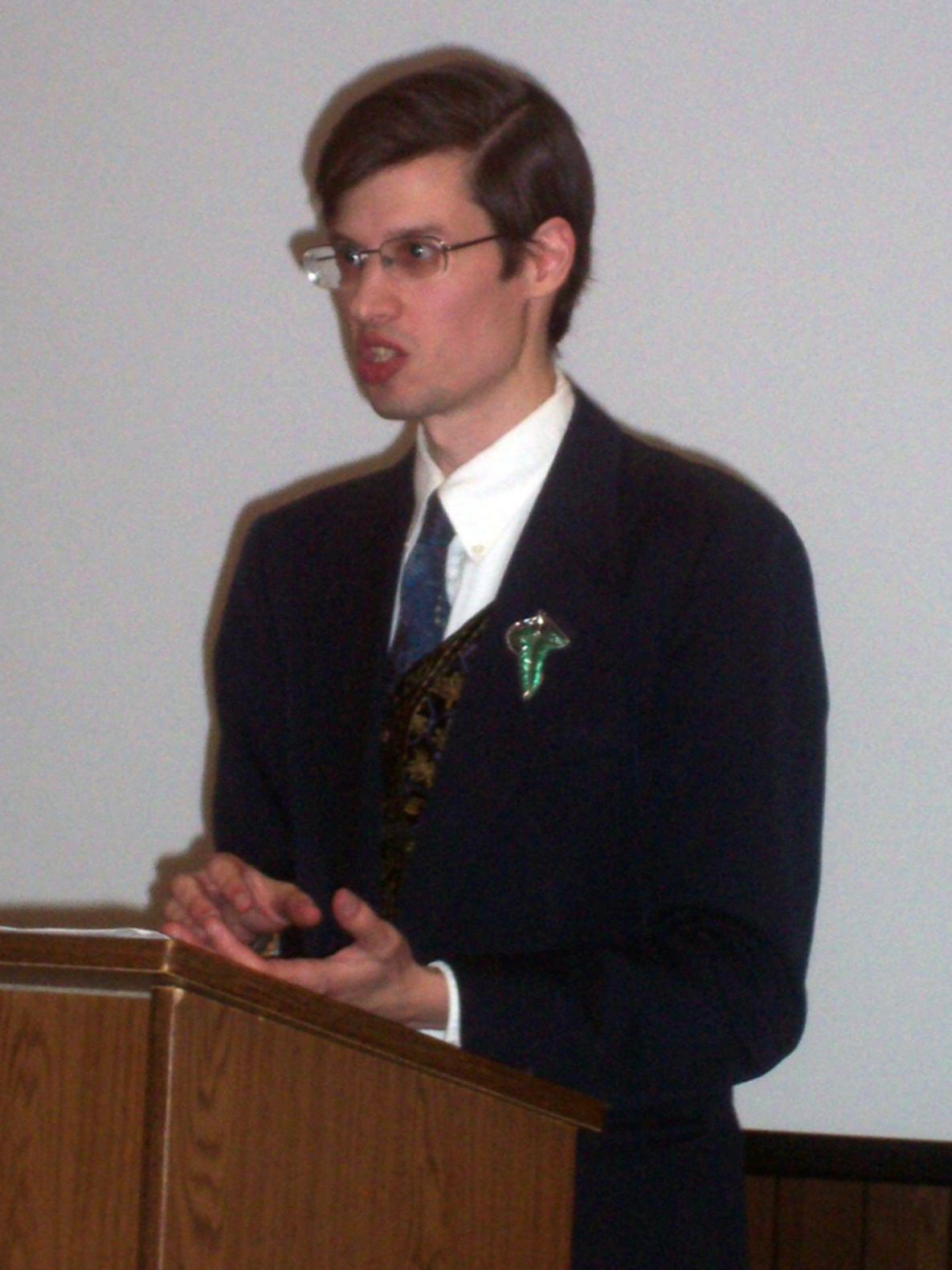
- David Salo giving a speech in Bloomington, Illinois, April 30, 2005
- Education: University of Wisconsin-Madison
- Occupation: Linguist

David Salo is an American linguist who worked on the languages of J. R. R. Tolkien for the Lord of the Rings and The Hobbit film trilogies, expanding the languages (particularly Sindarin) by building on vocabulary already known from published works, and defining some languages that previously had a very small published vocabulary.

== Salo on Tolkien's languages ==
=== Enthusiast ===
Salo's interest in Tolkien's languages arose when he read Tolkien's works as a boy. As an undergraduate at Macalester College, Minnesota he studied Latin, Greek, and linguistics, and used the knowledge gained to improve his understanding of Tolkien's languages. In 1998 he was among the founders of the Elfling mailing list for Tolkienist language enthusiasts. He graduated in linguistics at the University of Wisconsin–Madison. In 2004 he published a linguistic analysis of Sindarin: A Gateway to Sindarin: A Grammar of an Elvish language from J.R.R. Tolkien's Lord of the Rings. This book was reviewed in 2006 in volume 3 of the journal Tolkien Studies, and it was further reviewed in the context of Tolkienian linguistics as a whole in volume 4 of Tolkien Studies (2007).

=== Consultant ===
In 2003, when still a graduate student in linguistics at the University of Wisconsin–Madison, Salo was contracted for The Lord of the Rings film trilogy to write all the material in Elvish (particularly Sindarin), Khuzdul (Dwarvish) and other languages for the films, as well as to assist with other language-related items such as the Tengwar and Cirth inscriptions which appear in the films. Salo also translated the lyrics for the films' soundtracks: many of these are sung in Sindarin in Howard Shore's long and innovative music score for the film series. Subsequently, Salo provided similar services as the Tolkien language consultant for The Hobbit film trilogy.

He provided assistance with Khuzdul for the 2023 video game The Lord of the Rings: Return to Moria.

== Works ==
=== Bibliography ===
- 2004: A Gateway to Sindarin: A Grammar of an Elvish language from J.R.R. Tolkien's Lord of the Rings (ISBN 0-87480-800-6)

=== Consultant ===
- The Lord of the Rings film trilogy (2001-2003)
- The Hobbit film trilogy (2012-2014)
- The Lord of the Rings: Return to Moria (2023)
