= Black Speech =

Fictional language by J. R. R. Tolkien

- Created by: J. R. R. Tolkien
- Date: c. 1945–1973
- Setting and usage: Mordor in Middle-earth
- Purpose: Constructed language: Artistic language; Black Speech

Language codes
- ISO 639-3: None (mis)
- Glottolog: None

The Black Speech is one of the languages constructed by J. R. R. Tolkien for his legendarium, where it was spoken in the evil realm of Mordor. In the fiction, Tolkien describes the language as created by Sauron as a constructed language to be the sole language of all the servants of Mordor.

Little is known of the Black Speech except the inscription on the One Ring. Scholars note that Tolkien constructed this to be plausible linguistically, and to sound rough and harsh. The scholar Alexandre Nemirovski, on linguistic evidence, has proposed that Tolkien based it on the ancient Hurrian language, which like the Black Speech was agglutinative.

== Tolkien ==
=== Objective ===
Agglutination

In agglutinative languages like Turkish, the meaning of a word can be understood by breaking it down into the base word and its word endings. For example, in the word evlerimizde ev means "house", -ler indicates plurality, -imiz means "our", and -de means "in". Therefore, evlerimizde means "in our houses".

— Turkish Textbook

The Black Speech is one of the more fragmentary languages in The Lord of the Rings. Unlike his extensive work on the Elvish languages, Tolkien did not write songs or poems in the Black Speech, apart from the One Ring inscription. He stated that:

The Black Speech was not intentionally modelled on any style, but was meant to be self consistent, very different from Elvish, yet organized and expressive, as would be expected of a device of Sauron before his complete corruption. It was evidently an agglutinative language. ... I have tried to play fair linguistically, and it is meant to have a meaning and not to be a mere casual group of nasty noises, though an accurate transcription would even nowadays only be printable in the higher and artistically more advanced form of literature. According to my taste such things are best left to Orcs, ancient and modern.

Tolkien's attitude to the Black Speech is revealed in one of his letters. From a fan, Tolkien received a goblet with the Ring inscription on it in Black Speech. Because the Black Speech in general is an accursed language, and the Ring inscription in particular is a vile spell, Tolkien never drank out of the goblet, and used it only as an ashtray.

=== Fictional history ===
The linguist and Tolkien scholar Carl F. Hostetter wrote that the Dark Lord Sauron created the Black Speech "in a perverse antiparallel of Aulë's creation of Khuzdul for the Dwarves". Sauron attempted to impose Black Speech as the official language of the lands he dominated and all his servants, but in this he was only partially successful. Black Speech influenced the Orcs' vocabulary, but soon developed into many Orkish dialects, which were not mutually intelligible. By the end of the Third Age, Orcs mostly communicated using a debased Westron. Tolkien described one Orc's utterances as being in "the Common Speech, which he made almost as hideous as his own tongue".

The language was used "only in Mordor", Tolkien stated, and it was "never used willingly by any other people"; for this reason, "even the names of places in Mordor are in English", representing Westron.

=== The One Ring inscription ===
The only text of "pure" Black Speech is the inscription upon the One Ring. It is written in the Elvish Tengwar script, with flourishes:

Ash nazg durbatulûk, ash nazg gimbatul,
ash nazg thrakatulûk agh burzum-ishi krimpatul.

One Ring to rule them all, One Ring to find them,
One Ring to bring them all and in the darkness bind them.

The couplet is from the Rhyme of the Rings, a verse describing the Rings of Power. This corresponds to the following table as explained by Tolkien.

Black Speech	Tolkien's English glosses
ash	one
nazg	(finger-)ring
durb-	constrain, force, dominate
-at	verb ending, like a participle
-ulûk	verbal ending expressing object 3rd person plural "them" (ul) in completive or total form "them-all".
gimb-	seek out, discover
-ul	them
thrak-	bring by force, hale, drag
agh	and
burzum	darkness
ishi	in, inside (usually placed after noun in Black Speech).
krimp-	bind, tie

=== Sound and meaning ===
The Black Speech was by Tolkien's real intention, and Sauron's fictional one also, a harshly guttural language "with such sounds as sh, gh, zg; indeed," wrote Hostetter, "establishing this effect, as well as the bits of grammar needed to lend the Ring-inscription linguistic verisimilitude, seems to have been about the extent of Tolkien's work on this language." David Ashford, in the Journal of the Fantastic in the Arts, observes that uniquely among Tolkien's languages, the Black Speech is explicitly a constructed language devised as unpleasant by Sauron for his Orcs, and described by Tolkien as

so full of harsh and hideous sounds and vile words that other mouths found it difficult to compass, and few indeed were willing to make the attempt

Linguists including Ashford and Helge Fauskanger comment that this is Tolkien's subjective view, as it is difficult to identify which sounds might have been experienced as hideous. Fauskanger suggests that the Elves did not like the uvular r employed by the Orcs. The Tolkien scholar Tom Shippey writes that the word durbatulûk, "to rule them all", embodied Tolkien's view that sound and meaning went together, commenting that

certainly, the harsh vowels and jagged consonants and consonant clusters lend themselves to rough and rasping pronunciation, a fitting evocation of the voices of Orcs.

=== Other examples ===
A few Black Speech words are given in Appendix F of The Return of the King. These include Lugbúrz, meaning "Dark Tower" (Barad-dûr), uruk, "orc", snaga, "slave", and ghâsh, "fire". The name Nazgûl is a combination of nazg meaning "ring" and gûl meaning "wraith(s)", hence "ringwraith". Another Orkish word, sharkû, "old man", is given in "The Scouring of the Shire".

The only known sample of debased Black Speech/Orkish is in The Two Towers, where a "yellow-fanged" Mordor Orc curses the Isengard Uruk Uglúk:

Uglúk u bagronk sha pushdug Saruman-glob búbhosh skai!

In The Peoples of Middle-earth, Christopher Tolkien gives the translation: "Uglúk to the cesspool, sha! the dungfilth; the great Saruman-fool, skai!". However, in a note published in the journal Vinyar Tengwar, it is translated: "Uglúk to the dung-pit with stinking Saruman-filth, pig-guts, gah!"

== In film and music ==
For Peter Jackson's The Lord of the Rings film trilogy, the linguist David Salo used what little is known of the Black Speech to invent two phrases:

Gû kîbum kelkum-ishi, burzum-ishi. Akha gûm-ishi ashi gurum.
("No life in coldness, in darkness. Here in void, only death.")

The word burzum-ishi ('in darkness') is taken from the Ring Verse, and three other abstract nouns are invented with the same ending –um. The word ashi, meaning 'only', is taken from ash ('one') in the Ring Verse. The other words were made up by Salo.

== Analysis ==
=== Comparison with Elvish languages ===
The Swedish linguist Nils-Lennart Johannesson compared the phonology and syllable structure of the Black Speech with those of Tolkien's two major Elvish languages, Quenya and Sindarin. He found that there were more sonorant sounds and more open syllables in Elvish than in either English or Black Speech. He stated that these consistent differences were "sufficiently prominent" to make Elvish sound "pleasant and harmonious", whereas Black Speech sounded "harsh and strident".

M. G. Meile, labelling the Black Speech as "Sauron's Newspeak" by analogy with George Orwell's dystopian language, noted that it was "doubly artificial": where the Elvish languages were Tolkien's invention, the Black Speech was also a constructed language in his invented Middle-earth, since it had been created by the Dark Lord Sauron as an "evil Esperanto" for his slaves. He stated that as the only language of this type in Middle-earth, this made the Black Speech more important than it would appear from the few words Tolkien defined for it. Further, Tolkien wrote that it was made in mockery of Quenya, in other words that it was an evil language shadowing "the linguistic embodiment of good", and indeed, Meile wrote, it had many correspondences with Quenya. For instance, the word for Orcs, the monsters made in mockery of the Elves, is Quenya "urco, orco", which becomes Black Speech "Uruk".

The linguist Joanna Podhorodecka examines the lámatyáve, a Quenya term for "phonetic fitness", of Tolkien's constructed languages. She analyses them in light of Iván Fónagy's theory of symbolic vocal gestures that convey emotions. She notes that Tolkien's inspiration was "primarily linguistic"; and that he had invented the stories "to provide a world for the languages", which in turn were "agreeable to [his] personal aesthetic". She compares two samples of Elvish (one Sindarin, one Quenya) and one of Black Speech, tabulating the proportions of vowels and consonants. The Black Speech is 63% consonants, compared to the Elvish samples' 52% and 55%. Among other features, front vowel sounds like /i/ (like the i in machine) are much rarer in Black Speech than in Elvish, while back vowel sounds like /u/ (like the u in brute) are much more common. Podhorodecka therefore comments that the phonology of Black Speech is similar to speech affected by aggressive emotions, which has a higher proportion of consonants (especially plosives) to vowels. She concludes that Tolkien's constructed languages were certainly individual to him, but that their "linguistic patterns resulted from his keen sense of phonetic metaphor", so that the languages subtly contribute to the "aesthetic and axiological aspects of his mythology".

=== Parallels to natural languages ===
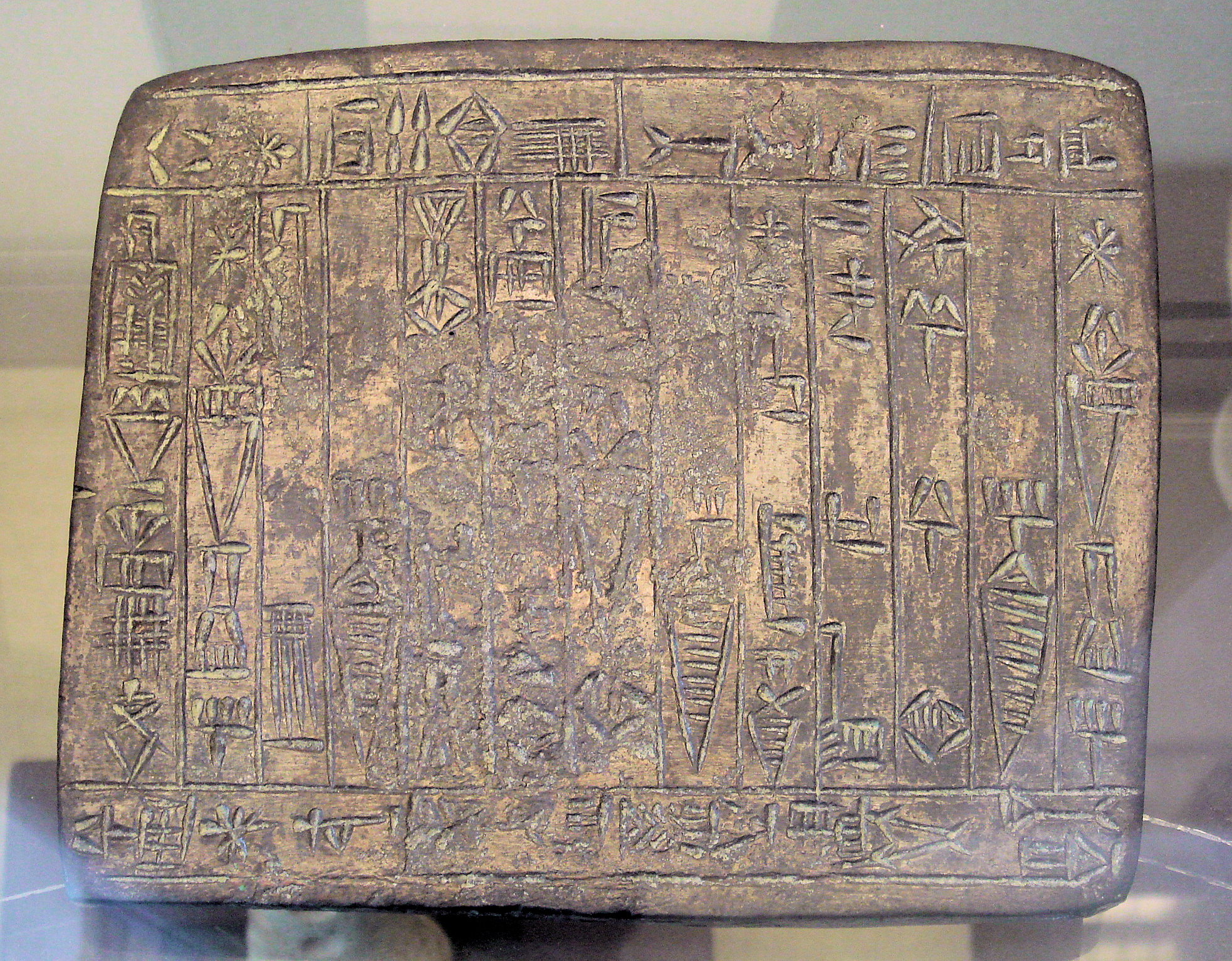
Black Speech has been compared to the Hurrian language, seen here on the Foundation Tablet, c. 2000 BC

The Russian historian Alexandre Nemirovski claimed a strong similarity to the extinct Hurrian language of northern Mesopotamia, which had recently been partially deciphered at the time of the writing of The Lord of the Rings, E. A. Speiser's Introduction to Hurrian appearing in 1941. Helge Fauskanger corresponded with Nemirovski, and notes that Nemirovski argued that Tolkien designed Black Speech "after some acquaintance with Hurrian-Urartian language(s)." The evidence that Nemirovski presented for this is entirely linguistic, based on similarities of the elements of the agglutinative forms of Black Speech; Hurrian was similarly agglutinative.

Parallels perceived by Nemirovski between Black Speech and Hurrian
Black Speech	English	Hurrian	Meaning in Hurrian (possible Black Speech interpretation)
durb-	to rule	turob-	something predestined to occur (perhaps: an evil destiny)
-ûk	completely	-ok-	"fully, really"
gimb-	to find	-ki(b)	to take, to gather
burz-	dark	wur-, wurikk-	to see, to be blind (perhaps: in the dark)
krimp-	to tie	ker-imbu-	to make longer fully (perhaps: if of a rope, to tie tightly)

Ashford writes that the Black Speech is at once agglutinative and ergative, "something of a rarity even now". Further, in the 1940s ergativity was a recent linguistic discovery, so that Tolkien was making use of the newest research in his favourite field. In Ashford's view, given the "striking parallels" in both syntax and morphology, the "mysterious history", and the "topical interest" of Hurrian at that time, the case for a Hurrian connection is persuasive.

Tolkien stated that when coining the Black Speech word nazg, he might have been influenced by the Irish word nasc ("ring, fastening, tie"). He denied that nazg had any connection to Old English.

Mark Mandel, writing in the Tolkien Journal in 1965, wrote that -ishi is "a postposition of location, or (to borrow a term from Finnish grammar) an inessive suffix."

== See also ==
- Fictional languages
- Constructed languages

== Sources ==
- Carpenter, Humphrey, ed. (2023) [1981]. The Letters of J. R. R. Tolkien: Revised and Expanded Edition. New York: HarperCollins. ISBN 978-0-35-865298-4.
- Hammond, Wayne G.; Scull, Christina (2005). The Lord of the Rings: A Reader's Companion. HarperCollins. ISBN 978-0-00-720907-1.
- Tolkien, J. R. R. (1954a). The Fellowship of the Ring. The Lord of the Rings. Boston: Houghton Mifflin. OCLC 9552942.
- Tolkien, J. R. R. (1955). The Return of the King. The Lord of the Rings. Boston: Houghton Mifflin. OCLC 519647821.
- Tolkien, J. R. R. (1996). Christopher Tolkien (ed.). The Peoples of Middle-earth. Boston: Houghton Mifflin. ISBN 978-0-395-82760-4.
