= Sarati =

Fictional script in the fantasy works of J. R. R. Tolkien

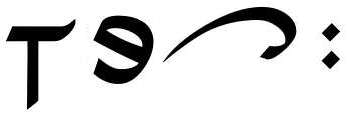
- Script type: Abugida
- Creator: J. R. R. Tolkien
- Period: V.Y. 1179-
- Direction: Mixed
- Languages: Quenya

Related scripts
- Child systems: Tengwar

ISO 15924
- ISO 15924: Sara (292), Sarati

Sarati is an artificial script, one of several scripts created by J. R. R. Tolkien. According to Tolkien's mythology, the Sarati alphabet was invented by the Elf Rúmil of Tirion.

== External history ==
As Tolkien strove to create a world that would feel authentic, he realized that for that to be possible, he must invent accompanying scripts for his languages. And, being a perfectionist, he acknowledged that a fully-fledged writing system could not have just appeared out of nowhere. Therefore, he set out to create a series of scripts for the elves as well as for the humans and dwarves that would indicate a certain degree of evolution and development. The first script for the elves was the Sarati which eventually developed into Tengwar by Fëanor.

Known as the first writing system of Arda, Sarati was in the fiction invented by the Ñoldorin chronicler Rúmil of Valinor in the Valian Year 1169 of the First Age. It was he "who first achieved fitting signs for the recording of speech and song" The writing system is officially called Sarati as each letter of the script represents a "sarat". However, Tolkien sometimes called the writing system "The Tengwar of Rúmil", where the word tengwar means "letters" in Quenya. "Sarati" is the Quenya name for Rúmil's script.

Upon marrying and getting a job as an assistant on the Oxford English Dictionary, Tolkien began to keep a diary that was written exclusively using the "alphabet of Rúmil". It has been described as a script that looks like a "mixture of Hebrew, Greek, and Pitman's shorthand."

== Description ==
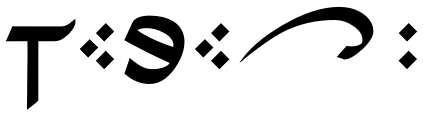
"Sarati" written in Sarati, from left to right, the letter "a" shown explicitly. Usually, the letter "a" is omitted, making this an abugida script with implicit "a" after each unmarked consonant.

Each full character represents a consonant, while vowels are represented with diacritics (called tehtar in the terminology associated with the Tengwar). In Sarati, vowel signs are written to the left if the vowel comes before or to the right if after the consonants in horizontal writing. In vertical writing, vowels are written above and below in the same principle. According to Tolkien, consonants were considered more salient than vowels, and vowels were considered merely modifiers. When writing Quenya, the sign for "a" is usually omitted, as it is the most common vowel in Quenya. This makes Sarati an abugida with an inherent vowel of "a".

=== Consonants ===
In accordance with the leading theory at the time, the consonants were created as the main characters of Sarati, while the role of vowels was secondary and were used to accentuate the consonants. The consonants, more so than the vowels, appear differently throughout the texts. Only the shapes of a select few sarati are stable, varying just slightly. The alterations of the shapes can be mostly attributed to Tolkien's constant work on the development of the script.

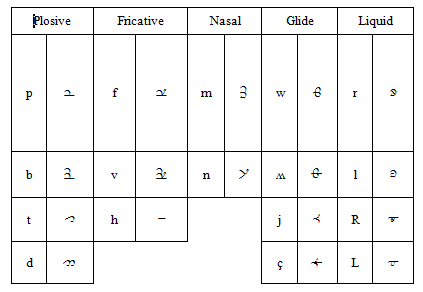

=== Vowels ===
As mentioned above, the role of the vowels was to emphasize linguistically and, possibly, aesthetically, the consonants of the script. Therefore, the vowels fill the role of diacritics, which can be pronounced either before or after the consonant. The vowel diacritics often can also double the sound or indicate an adjacent "s" or a preceding homorganic nasal. Though vowel diacritics vary considerably less frequently than the consonants, vowels had undergone considerable changes throughout the years.

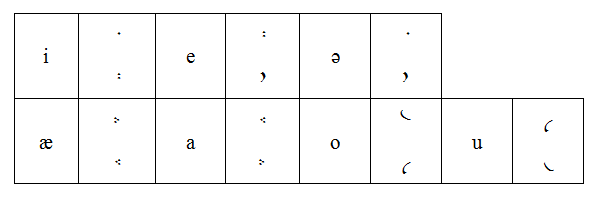

== Features ==
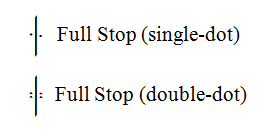
Sarati's punctuation marks

As Sarati was created for the Eldar who were ambidextrous, the script can be written right-to-left; left-to-right; top-to-bottom, from the right or left; or boustrophedon (back-and-forth). When writing from right-to-left, the left hand was employed, whereas when writing left-to-right, the right hand was used. This prevented the accidental smudging of ink, and allowed the writer to see what had just been written. Also, as Sarati was meant to represent an older script, its distinguishing trait of allowing the script to be written in multiple directions is meant to mirror real ancient scripts that are known for their less rigid nature.

While a fair amount of punctuation marks have been created for the script, Sarati has established only two punctuation marks (both of which serve as a full stop) that are used consistently throughout texts.

Tolkien created a system of Rúmilian numerals for Sarati.

== See also ==
- Elvish languages

== Sources ==
- Martinez, Helios De Rosario (30 September 2007). "Rúmilian Numerals". Tengwestië.
- Smith, Arden R. "The Túrin Prose Fragment: An Analysis of a Rúmilian Document." Vinyar Tengwar 37 (1995): 15–23.
- Smith, Arden R., Irmengard Rauch and Gerald F. Carr. "The Semiotics of the Writing Systems of Tolkien's Middle-earth." In Semiotics around the World: Synthesis in Diversity, I-II, ed. Irmengard Rauch, 1239–42. Berlin, Germany: De Gruyter, 1997.
- Tolkien, J. R. R. (1977). Christopher Tolkien (ed.). The Silmarillion. Boston: Houghton Mifflin. ISBN 978-0-395-25730-2.
- Tolkien, J.R.R. "The Alphabet of Rúmil." Parma Eldalamberon 13 (2001).
