= I-mutation =

Vowel sound change

I-mutation (also known as umlaut, front mutation, i-umlaut, i/j-mutation or i/j-umlaut) is a type of sound change in which a back vowel is fronted or a front vowel is raised if the following syllable contains /i/, /iː/ or /j/ (a voiced palatal approximant, sometimes called yod, the sound of English ⟨y⟩ in yes). It is a category of regressive metaphony, or vowel harmony.

The term is usually used by scholars of the Germanic languages: it is particularly important in the history of the Germanic languages because inflectional suffixes with an /i/ or /j/ led to many vowel alternations that are still important in the morphology of the languages.

== Germanic languages ==
I-mutation took place separately in the various Germanic languages from around 450 or 500 CE in the North Sea area and affected all the early languages, except for Gothic. It seems to have taken effect earliest and most completely in Old English and Old Norse. It took place later in Old High German; by 900, its effects are consistently visible only in the spelling of Germanic */a/.

== Other languages ==
I-mutation exists in many other languages but is often referred to by different names. As an example, in the Romance languages, it is more commonly called metaphony (from Ancient Greek, meaning "process of changing sounds," which translates into German as umlaut: um "about" with laut "sound"). Meanwhile, in Celtic languages, it is referred to as affection. A type of i-mutation is also observed in Anatolian languages, including Hittite, Luwian, Lycian and Lydian.

=== Korean language ===
In Middle Korean, I-backward-sequenced vowels (ㅐ, ㅔ, ㅒ, ㅖ, ㅚ, ㅟ, ㅢ) were diphthongs, i.e. ㅐ [ɐj], ㅔ [əj], ㅒ [jɐj], ㅖ [jəj], ㅚ [oj], ㅟ [uj], ㅢ[ɯj ~ ɰi]. However, in early modern Korean, they are monophthongized by umlaut, i.e. ㅐ [ɛ], ㅔ [e], ㅒ [jɛ], ㅖ [je], ㅚ [ø], ㅟ [y] with only one exception: ㅢ. However, in late modern Korean, ㅟ is diphthongized to [ɥi]. Also, ㅚ is unstable and standard Korean allows to pronounce both [ø] and [we].

In modern Korean language, there are two types of I-mutation, or I-assimilation: I-forward-assimilation (ㅣ 순행 동화) and I-backward-assimilation (ㅣ 역행 동화). Assimilation occurs when ㅣ is in front of (forward) or behind (backward) the syllable. In standard Korean, only a few words are allowed to assimilate, however, exceptions are often observed in some dialects and casual usage. I-forward-assimilation adds [j] sound, but I-backward-assimilation causes vowel to umlaut.

- Forward: 피어 (to bloom) [pʰi.ʌ] → 피여 [pʰi.jʌ], 아니오 (no) [ɐ.ȵi.o] → 아니요 [a.ȵi.jo]
- Backward: (Western Korean dialect) 아기 (baby) [ɐ.ɡi] → 애기 [ɛ.ɡi], 어미 (mother) [ʌ.mi] → 에미 [e.mi], 고기 (meat) [ko.ɡi] → 괴기 [kø.ɡi ‐ kwe.ɡi]

=== South Asia ===
Toda has fronting of u in the condition (C¹)_C²V where C² = {y, cc} or V = i, e.g. Tamil /puli/, Toda /pysj/.

Kannada raised e, o when next to i, e.g. Tamil eli, oli, Kannada ili, uli.

Sinhala had I-umlaut for a, e.g. Sanskrit ákṣi, Sinhala æsa.

=== Mongolic languages ===
In the development of the Eastern Mongolic languages, as well as Oirat and its varieties, I-mutation merged several reflexes of Proto-Mongolic back vowels *u, *o, and *a with their front vowel equivalents. Examples from Kalmyk Oirat include and *uri > [yr] (to summon), *morin > [mørn] (horse), and *amin > [æmn] (life).

== See also ==
- Old English phonology
