= Sindarin =

Fictional language in the fantasy works of J. R. R. Tolkien

- Created by: J. R. R. Tolkien
- Date: c. 1915 to 1973
- Setting and usage: The fictional world of Middle-earth
- Purpose: constructed languages: artistic languages; fictional languages; Sindarin
- Writing system: Tengwar (mainly), Cirth
- Sources: a priori language, but related to the other Elvish languages. Sindarin was influenced primarily by Welsh.

Language codes
- ISO 639-3: sjn
- Glottolog: sind1281

Sindarin is one of the constructed languages devised by J. R. R. Tolkien for use in his fantasy stories set in Arda, primarily in Middle-earth. Sindarin is one of the many languages spoken by the Elves.

The word Sindarin is Quenya for Grey-elven, since it was the language of the Grey Elves of Beleriand. These were Elves of the Third Clan who remained behind in Beleriand after the Great Journey. Their language became estranged from that of their kin who sailed over the sea. Sindarin derives from an earlier language called Common Telerin, which evolved from Common Eldarin, the tongue of the Eldar before their divisions, e.g., those Elves who decided to follow the Vala Oromë and undertook the Great March to Valinor. Even before that the Eldar Elves spoke the original speech of all Elves, or Primitive Quendian.

In the Third Age (the setting of The Lord of the Rings), Sindarin was the language most commonly spoken by most Elves in the Western part of Middle-earth. Sindarin is the language usually referred to as the Elf-Tongue or Elven-Tongue in The Lord of the Rings. When the Quenya-speaking Noldor returned to Middle-earth, they adopted the Sindarin language. Quenya and Sindarin were related, with many cognate words but differing greatly in grammar and structure. Sindarin is said to be more changeful than Quenya, and there were during the First Age a number of regional dialects. The tongue used in Doriath (home of Thingol, King of the Sindar), known as Doriathrin, was said by many Grey-elves to be the highest and most noble form of the language.

In the Second Age, many Men of Númenor spoke Sindarin fluently. Their descendants, the Dúnedain of Gondor and Arnor, continued to speak Sindarin in the Third Age. Sindarin was first written using the Cirth, an Elvish runic alphabet. Later, it was usually written in the Tengwar (Quenya for 'letters') – a script invented by the elf Fëanor. Tolkien based the phonology and some of the grammar of Sindarin on Literary Welsh, and Sindarin displays some of the consonant mutations that characterize the Celtic languages.

The Dwarves rarely taught their language to others, so they learned both Quenya and Sindarin in order to communicate with the Elves, especially the Noldor and Sindar. (Note: Tolkien 1977, Quenta Silmarillion, ch. 10 "Of the Sindar") By the Third Age, however, the Dwarves were estranged from the Elves and no longer routinely learned their language, preferring to use Westron.

== Two timelines ==
For Tolkien's constructed languages one must distinguish two timelines of development:

- One external, in which Tolkien's linguistic taste and conceptions evolved
- One internal, consisting of the sequence of events within the fictional history of Tolkien's secondary world

== External timeline ==
=== Goldogrin and other early languages ===
Tolkien was interested in languages from an early age, and developed several constructed languages while still a teenager. Eventually, as a young adult, he created an entire family of constructed languages spoken by Elves and a secondary world where these could evolve.

One of these languages was created around 1915, inspired by the Celtic languages, particularly Literary Welsh. Tolkien called it Goldogrin or "Gnomish" in English. He wrote a substantial dictionary of Gnomish and a grammar. (Note: I-Lam na-Ngoldathon: The Grammar and Lexicon of the Gnomish Tongue. Parma Eldalamberon 11.) This is the first conceptual stage of the Sindarin language. At the same time Tolkien conceived a History of the Elves and wrote it in the Book of Lost Tales. Gnomish was spoken by the Gnomes or Noldoli, the Second Clan of Elves, and Elfin was the other tongue spoken by the great majority of the Elves of the Lonely Isle.

The beginning of the "Name-list of the Fall of Gondolin", one of the Lost Tales, gives a good example of both languages (Gnomish and Elfin):

"Here is set forth by Eriol at the teaching of Bronweg's son Elfrith or 'Littleheart' (and he was so named for the youth and wonder of his heart) those names and words that are used in these tales from either the tongue of the Elves of Kor as at the time spoken in the Lonely Isle, or from that related one of the Noldoli their kin whom they wrested from Melko. Here first are they which appear in the Tale of Tuor and the Exiles of Gondolin, first among these those ones in the Gnome-speech (lam Goldrin). Ainon now these were great beings who dwelt with Ilúvatar as the Elves name him (but the Gnomes Ilador or Ilathon) ere the world grew, and some of these dwelt after in the world and ere the Gods or Ainur as say the Elves. (Note: Tolkien, J. R. R. "Name-list of the Fall of Gondolin", Parma Eldalamberon 15, p. 20.)

=== Noldorin ===
A few years later, c. 1925, Tolkien began anew the grammar and lexicon of the tongue of his Gnomes. He abandoned the words Goldogrin and lam Goldrin in favour of Noldorin (a Quenya word already sparingly used for his Gnomish tongue). This is the second conceptual stage of Sindarin. Tolkien then composed a grammar of this new Noldorin, the Lam na Ngoluith. (Note: Parma Eldalamberon 13.) In the early 1930s Tolkien wrote a new grammar of Noldorin. (Note: Still unpublished as of 2011.) This is the "late conceptual Noldorin". At the same time, Tolkien was developing the Ilkorin tongues of the Elves of the Third Clan who remained in Beleriand (those same Elves whom Tolkien would much later name Sindar in Quenya). Noldorin (the Welsh-style language) was at that time conceived as having evolved from the Old Noldorin spoken in Valinor to the many (not Welsh-like) dialects, later called Lemberin, that were spoken in Beleriand. The Noldorin Elves wanted to speak a distinct tongue from the First Clan Elves who also lived with them and spoke Quenya, and so they developed Old Noldorin from what Tolkien called Koreldarin: "the tongue of those who left Middle-earth, and came to Kór, the hill of the Elves in Valinor." (Note: Tolkien, J. R. R., Tengwesta Qenderinwa 1. Parma Eldalamberon 18, p. 24.)

=== From Noldorin and Welsh ===
Tolkien created Sindarin in around 1944. He used much of Noldorin and blended it with "Ilkorin Doriathrin" and added in some new features. On that matter, he wrote a side note on his "Comparative Tables": "Doriath[rin], etc. = Noldorin ((?)viz. as it used to be)". (Note: Tolkien, J. R. R. "Comparative Tables". Parma Eldalamberon 19, p. 23.) The Ilkorin tongues of 1930–50 spoken in Beleriand, e.g. Doriathrin and the other dialects, were not as much based on Welsh as Noldorin was, and Tolkien wanted his new "tongue of Beleriand" to be a Welsh-type language. In Tolkien's words, "The changes worked on Sindarin [from Common Eldarin] very closely (and deliberately) resemble those which produced the modern and medieval Welsh from ancient Celtic, so that in the result Sindarin has a marked Welsh style, and the relations between it and Quenya closely resemble those between Welsh and Latin." (Note: Tolkien 2007, p. 135.)

Tolkien did not provide a detailed description of the language in published works such as The Lord of the Rings, but he did say that (Note: Tolkien 2007, p. 61, letter to a reader.)

"A precise account, with drawings and other aids, of Dwarvish smith-practices, Hobbit-pottery, Numerorean medicine and philosophy, and so on would interfere with the narrative [of the Lord of the Rings], or swell the Appendices. So too, would complete grammars and lexical collection of the languages. Any attempt at bogus 'completeness' would reduce the thing to a 'model', a kind of imaginary dolls house of pseudo-history. Much hidden and unexhibited work is needed to give the nomenclature a 'feel' of verisimilitude. But this story [The Lord of the Rings] is not the place for technical phonology and grammatical history. I hope to leave these things firmly sketched and recorded." [emphasis added]

Tolkien wrote many pieces in Sindarin. He made an effort to give to his Elvish languages the feel and taste of natural languages. He wanted to infuse in them a kind of life, while fitting them to a very personal aesthetic taste. He wanted to build languages primarily to satisfy his personal urge and not because he had some universal design in mind. (Note: Carpenter 2023, #165 to Houghton Mifflin, 30 June 1955)

== Internal timeline ==
Elvish Languages mapped to kindreds and migrations in the Sundering of the Elves. Sindarin was initially spoken in Beleriand in the far Northwest of Middle-earth. After Beleriand's near-total destruction, Sindarin continued to be spoken in Middle-earth in the Third Age.

In Tolkien's words:

"Sindarin (Grey-elven) is properly the name of the languages of the Elvish inhabitants of Beleriand, the later almost drowned land west of the Blue Mountains. Quenya was the language of the Exiled High-Elves returning to Middle-earth. The Exiles, being relatively few in number, eventually adopted a form of Sindarin: a southern dialect (of which the purest and most archaic variety was used in Doriath ruled by Thingol). This they used in daily speech, and even adapted their own personal names to its form. But the Sindarin of the High-elves was (naturally) somewhat affected by Quenya, and contained some Quenya elements. Sindarin is also loosely applied to the related languages of the Elves of the same origin as the Grey Elves of Beleriand, who lived in Eriador and further East." (Note: Tolkien 2007, p. 127.)

=== Dialects ===
The divergence of Sindarin (Old Sindarin) begun first into a Northern or Mithrimin group and a Southern group. The Southern group had a much larger territory, and included Doriathrin or "Central Sindarin". (Note: Tolkien 2007, p. 133)

"Círdan was a Telerin Elf, one of the highest of those who were not transported to Valinor but became known as the Sindar, the Grey-elves; he was akin to Olwë, one of the two kings of the Teleri, and lord of those who departed over the Great Sea. He was thus also akin to Elwë, Olwë's elder brother, acknowledged as high-king of all the Teleri in Beleriand, even after he withdrew to the guarded realm of Doriath. But Círdan and his people remained in many ways distinct from the rest of the Sindar. They retained the old name Teleri (in later Sindarin form Telir, or Telerrim) and remained in many ways a separate folk, speaking even in later days a more archaic language." (Note: Tolkien 1996, ch. 13 "Last Writings", "Círdan")

So during the First Age, before the return of the Noldor, there were four dialects of Sindarin:

- Sindarin
  - Southern group
    - Doriathrin, the language of Doriath;
    - Falathrin or "West Sindarin", the language of the Falas;
  - Northern group
    - North-Western dialect, spoken in Hithlum, Mithrim, and Dor-lómin;
    - North-Eastern dialect, spoken in Ard-galen (before its ruin), and the highlands of Dorthonion (Taur-nu-Fuin).

==== Doriathrin ====
Doriathrin preserved many archaic features. Unlike the other dialects, it remained free from Quenya influences. The "accent" of Doriath was also quite recognisable, so that after Túrin had left Doriath he kept a Doriathrin accent until his death, which immediately pinpointed his origin to speakers of other dialects of Sindarin. "The post-war 'Beleriandic' as lingua franca and as a language of Noldor was strongly influenced by Doriath." (Note: Tolkien 2007, p. 132) Tolkien set out much about Doriathrin's morphology, and how it contrasts with the other Sindarin dialects, in his linguistic writings:

"Doriathrin preserved in common use the dual of nouns, pronouns, and verbal personal inflexions, as well as a clear distinction between 'general' or 'collective' plurals (as elenath), and 'particular' plurals (as elin). ... But it was none-the-less in a few but important points of phonology marked by changes not universal in Sindarin. Most notable among these was the spirantalizing of m > nasal ṽ, the nasality of which was, however, never lost in Doriathrin proper until after the dissolution of the "Hidden Realm". ... The changes of mp, nt, ñk, also proceeded earlier and further than in the other dialects."

==== Falathrin ====
The language of the followers of the Elf Círdan, called Falathrin (Falassian in English), is the other dialect of the Southern Sindarin group. It remained close to the tongue of Doriath because there was great trade between the two groups up to the time of the Wars of Beleriand.

==== North Sindarin ====
North Sindarin was spoken by the Mithrim, the northernmost group of the Grey-elves. It differed from the Central Sindarin of Beleriand in many aspects. Originally spoken in Dorthonion and Hithlum, it contained many unique words and was not fully intelligible to the other Elves. The Northern dialect was in many ways more conservative, and later divided itself into a North-Western dialect (Hithlum, Mithrim, Dor-lómin) and a North-Eastern dialect (the highlands of Dorthonion, and the wide plains of Ard-galen to the north of the highlands). This language was at first adopted by the exiled Noldor after their return to Middle-earth at Losgar. Later Noldorin Sindarin changed, much owing to the adoption of Quenya features, and partially because of the love of the Noldor for making linguistic changes. Beren's heritage was clear to Thingol of Doriath as he spoke the North Sindarin of his homeland. (Note: Tolkien 2007, p. 134.)

"Chief characteristics [of North Sindarin were the] preservation of p, t, k after nasals and l. Intervocalic m remained. No u and o and i/e remained distinct – no a mutation of i. S was unlenited initially. h (preserved) medially. tt, pp, kk > t, p, k medially."

==== Noldorin Sindarin ====
With the exception of Doriathrin, Sindarin adopted some Quenya features after the return of the Noldor, as well as unique sound changes devised by the Noldor (who loved changing languages): (Note: Tolkien 2007, p. 133.)

"It was the Noldor who in fact stabilized and made improvements to the 'Common Sindarin' of the days of the Wars, and it was based on West Sindarin. The old North dialect practically died out except in place names as Dorlomin, Hithlum, etc. but for a few scattered and hidden clans of the old Northern group and except in so far as adopted by the Fëanorians, who had moved east. So that in the days of the Wars, Sindarin was really divided into 'West Sindarin' (including all the Noldor of Finrod and Fingon), 'East Sindarin' (of the North dialect) was only preserved by the house of Feanor; and 'Central' or Doriath."

In the hidden city of Gondolin, an isolated land, a peculiar dialect developed: "This differed from the standard (of Doriath) (a) in having Western and some Northern elements, and (b) in incorporating a good many Noldorin-Quenya words in more or less Sindarized forms. Thus the city was usually called Gondolin (from Q. Ondolin(dë)) with simple replacement of g-, not Goenlin or Goenglin [as it would have been in standard Sindarin]".

==== In the Second and Third Age ====
'Beleriandic' Sindarin as a lingua franca of all Elves and many Men, and as the language of the Noldor in exile, was based on Western Sindarin but was strongly influenced by Doriathrin. During the Second Age Sindarin was a lingua franca for all Elves and their friends (thus it was used to inscribe the West-gate of Moria), until it was displaced for Men by Westron, which arose in the Third Age as a language heavily influenced by Sindarin. In Gondor at the end of the Third Age, Sindarin was still spoken daily by a few noble Men in the city Minas Tirith. Aragorn, raised in the safety of the Elvish stronghold of Rivendell, (Note: Tolkien 1955, Appendix A "The Númenórean Kings") spoke it fluently. (Note: Carpenter 2023, #230 to Rhona Beare, 8 June 1961) (Note: Tolkien 1954a, book 1, ch. 12 "Flight to the Ford")

== Phonology ==
Sindarin was designed with a Welsh-like phonology. (Note: Tolkien 2007, p. 135.) Stress is as in Latin: on the penult if that is heavy (a closed syllable, long vowel or diphthong) and on the antepenult if the penult is light.

=== Consonants ===
Sindarin consonants
	Labial	Dental	Alveolar		Palatal	Velar	Uvular	Glottal
	Labial	Dental	Median	Lateral	Palatal	Velar	Uvular	Glottal
Nasal	m		n			ŋ (Note: written ⟨ng⟩)		
Plosive	p b		t d			k (Note: written ⟨c⟩) ɡ		
Fricative	f v	θ (Note: written ⟨th⟩) ð (Note: written ⟨dh⟩)	s	ɬ (Note: written ⟨lh⟩ and ⟨ll⟩ depending on etymology.)			χ (Note: written ⟨ch⟩)	h
Trill			r̥ (Note: written ⟨rh⟩) r					
Approximant				l	j	ʍ (Note: written ⟨hw⟩) w		

The phoneme /f/ is voiced to [v] when final or before /n/, but remains written as ⟨f⟩. The sound [f] is written ⟨ph⟩ when final (alph, "swan") or when used to spell a lenited /p/ (i-Pheriannath, "the Halflings") which becomes [f]. Old Sindarin, like Common Brittonic and Old Irish, also had a spirant m or nasal v /ṽ/, which was transcribed as ⟨mh⟩. This merged with /v/ in later Sindarin. Phonemically, Sindarin ⟨ch⟩ aligns with the other velar consonants like ⟨c⟩, ⟨g⟩, ⟨w⟩, etc. but is phonetically the voiceless uvular fricative [χ].

==== Orthographic conventions ====
Sindarin orthographic conventions
Letter	IPA	Notes
i	j ɪ iː	Represents /j/ when initial before vowels, /ɪ/ (short vowel) and /iː/ (long vowel) everywhere else.
ng	ŋ ŋɡ	Represents /ŋ/ when final, /ŋɡ/ everywhere else.
ph	f	Represents /f/ word-finally (owing to ⟨f⟩ being used for /v/) and represents mutation of word-initial /p/ to /f/.
f	f v	Represents /f/ everywhere except finally where it is always /v/.

=== Vowels ===
==== Monophthongs ====
Sindarin vowels
	Front	Back
Close	iː yː	uː
Near-close	ɪ ʏ	ʊ
Open-mid	ɛ(ː)	ɔ(ː)
Open	a(ː)	

The Sindarin vowels are ⟨a e i o u y⟩. An acute accent signifies a long vowel: ⟨á é í ó ú ý⟩. In a monosyllabic word, a circumflex is used: ⟨â ê î ô û ŷ⟩.

In Old Sindarin, there was a vowel similar to German ö [œ], which Tolkien mostly transcribed as ⟨œ⟩. Although this was meant to be distinct from the diphthong ⟨oe⟩, it was often simply printed ⟨oe⟩ in publications like The Silmarillion, e.g. Nírnaeth Arnoediad (read: Nírnaeth Arnœdiad), Goelydh (read: Gœlydh). This vowel later came to be pronounced [ɛ], transcribed e (e.g. Gelydh).

==== Diphthongs ====
Diphthongs are ⟨ai⟩ (pronounced like aisle [aɪ̯]), ⟨ei⟩ (day [ɛɪ̯]), ⟨ui⟩ (ruin [ʊɪ̯]), and ⟨au⟩ (cow [aʊ̯]). If the diphthong [aʊ̯] finishes a word, it is written ⟨aw⟩. There are also diphthongs ⟨ae⟩ [aɛ̯] and ⟨oe⟩ [ɔɛ̯] with no English counterparts, similar to pronouncing a or o respectively in the same syllable as one pronounces an e (as in pet). Tolkien had described dialects (such as Doriathrin) and variations in pronunciations (such as that of Gondor), and other pronunciations of ⟨ae⟩ and ⟨oe⟩ undoubtedly existed.

Sindarin diphthongs
	Second component	
First component	Front	Back
Close	⟨ui⟩ [ʊɪ̯]	
Open-mid	⟨ei⟩ [ɛɪ̯]	⟨oe⟩ [ɔɛ̯]
Open	⟨ai⟩ [aɪ̯]	⟨ae⟩ [aɛ̯] ⟨au⟩ [aʊ̯]

== Grammar ==
A Elbereth Gilthoniel, a poem in Sindarin composed by Tolkien and written in Tengwar, in the mode of Beleriand

Tolkien wrote that he gave Sindarin "a linguistic character very like (though not identical with) British-Welsh ... because it seems to fit the rather 'Celtic' type of legends and stories told of its speakers".

Unlike the largely agglutinative Quenya, Sindarin is mainly a fusional language with some analytic tendencies. It can be distinguished from Quenya by the rarity of vowel endings, and the use of voiced plosives b d g, rare in Quenya found only after nasals and liquids. Early Sindarin formed plurals by the addition of -ī, which vanished but affected the preceding vowels (as in Welsh and Old English): S. Adan, pl. Edain, S. Orch, pl. Yrch. Sindarin forms plurals in multiple ways.

=== Nouns ===
While Sindarin does not have a grammatical gender, it has two systems of grammatical number, similar to Welsh. Singular/plural nouns correspond to the singular/plural number system just as in English. Sindarin noun plurals are unpredictable and formed in several ways.

Some Sindarin (and Noldorin) nouns of one syllable form the plural with an ending (usually -in), e.g. Drû, pl. Drúin "wild men, Woses, Púkel-Men". Others form the plural through vowel change, e.g. golodh and gelydh, "lore master, sage" (obsolete as a tribal name before the Noldor came back to Beleriand); Moredhel, pl. Moredhil, "Dark-Elves". Still others form their plurals through some combination of the two, and a few do not change in the plural: Belair, "Beleriandic-Elf/Elves" is singular and plural.

The other system of number was called by Tolkien 2nd plural or collective number. (Note: Tolkien 2007, p. 26 and p. 45-46.) The nouns in this system form it usually by adding a suffix to the plural (as in Welsh); for example -ath, as in elenath, "all the stars (in the sky)", but not always, as in Drúath. Another ending of the 2nd pl. is -rim, used especially to indicate a race-group: Nogothrim "the race of the Dwarves", from pl. Nogoth (sg. Nogon, "Dwarf"). There exist another such ending -lir, as in Nogothlir.

The endings -rim, -hoth, and -waith, Sindarin words meaning 'multitude', 'host', and 'people' respectively, are added to a singular noun to form a 2nd plural, e.g. Gaurhoth "the Werewolf-horde" and Gaurwaith "wolvish folk", from Gaur "werewolf".

==== Plural forms ====
Most Sindarin plurals are formed by vowel change and are characterised by i-mutation. The Noldorin term for this is prestanneth "affection of vowels". In an earlier stage of the language, plurals were marked by the suffix -ī, to which the root vowel(s) assimilated, becoming fronted (and raised if low); later the final -ī was lost, leaving the changed root vowel(s) as the sole marker of the plural. (This process is very similar to the Germanic umlaut that produced the English forms man/men, goose/geese, and closer still to the Welsh i-affection plurals in forms like gair/geiriau and car/ceir.) The resulting plural patterns are:

- In non-final syllables:
  - a > e – galadh (tree) > gelaidh (trees)
  - o > e – nogoth (female dwarf) > negyth (female dwarves) (originally became œ, which later became e)
  - u > y – tulus (poplar tree) > tylys (poplar trees)
- In final syllables:
  - a with one consonant following > ai – aran (king) > erain (kings)
  - a with consonant cluster following #1 > e – narn (saga) > nern (sagas)
  - a with consonant cluster following #2 > ai – cant (outline, shape) > caint (outlines, shapes) (nasal & plosive)
  - a with consonant cluster following #3 > ei – alph (swan) > eilph (swans) (liquid & fricative)
  - â > ai – tâl (foot) > tail (feet)
  - e > i – adaneth (mortal woman) > edenith (mortal women)
  - ê > î – hên (child) > hîn (children)
  - o > y – brannon (lord) > brennyn (lords)
  - o > e – orod (mountain) > ered (mountains) (in some cases)
  - ó > ý – bór (steadfast man) > býr (steadfast men)
  - ô > ŷ – thôn (pine tree) > thŷn (pine trees)
  - u > y – urug (monster) > yryg (monsters)
  - û > ui – hû (dog) > hui (dogs)
  - au > oe – naug (dwarf) > noeg (dwarves) (cf. German au > äu)
  - aea > ei – aear (sea) > eir (seas) (presumably changed further to air as is common at the end of Sindarin words; "a" actually changes to "ei" before "ai")

Vowels not listed do not undergo any change, such as /y/ remains as /y/, meaning that it is possible for some words to have the same form in the singular and plural.

=== Initial consonant mutations ===
Sindarin has a series of consonant mutations, varying between dialects as follows.

==== Mutations found in Noldorin ====
The mutations of "early conceptual Noldorin" are defined in Tolkien's Lam na Ngoluith, Early Noldorin Grammar. (Note: Tolkien, J. R. R., Lam na Ngoluith. Early Noldorin Grammar. Parma Eldalamberon 13, p. 120.)

Mutation is triggered in various ways:

- Soft mutation is triggered by a closely connected word ending in a vowel; the consonant then assumes the form it should have medially.
- Hard mutation is due to the gemination of an original initial consonant because of precedence of a closely connected word ending in a plosive.
- Nasal mutation is due to a preceding nasal.

The following table outlines how different consonants are affected by the three mutations.

Radical	Soft	Hard	Nasal
b	v (bh)	b	m
d	dh	d	n
g	’	g	ng
gw	’w	gw	ngw
p	b	ph	ph
t	d	th	th
c	g	ch	ch
cw	gw	chw	chw

The apostrophe ’ indicates elision, and is not necessarily written. Those forms of lenited p that are pronounced f are written ph as mentioned above.

Noldorin words beginning in b-, d-, or g-, which descend from older mb-, nd-, or ng- are affected differently by the mutations:

Radical	Soft	Hard	Nasal
b	m	b	m
d	n	d	n
g	ng	g	ng

Many of the mutations of Noldorin were taken into Sindarin a few years later. The Sindarin word gwath "shadow" becomes i 'wath, "the shadow".

==== Mutations found in Salo's grammar ====
David Salo's A Gateway to Sindarin proposes a more complex set of mutations, based on extrapolation from the Sindarin corpus, as follows (empty cells indicate no change):

Radical	Soft	Nasal	Stop	Liquid?	Mixed
t /t/	d /d/	th /θ/	th /θ/	th /θ/	d /d/
p /p/	b /b/	ph /f/	ph /f/	ph /f/	b /b/
c /k/	g /g/	ch /χ/	ch /χ/	ch /χ/	g /g/
d /d/	dh /ð/	n /n/		dh /ð/	
b /b/	v /v/	m /m/		v /v/	
g /g/	(deleted)	ng /ŋ/		(deleted)	
m /m/	v /v/			v /v/	
(n)d /d/	n /n/	nd /nd/	nd /nd/	d /d/	nd /nd/
(m)b /b/	m /m/	mb /mb/	mb /mb/	b /b/	mb /mb/
(n)g /g/	ng /ŋ/	ng /ŋg/	n-g /ŋg/	g /g/	ng /ŋg/
lh /ɬ/	l /l/	l /l/	l /l/	l /l/	l /l/
rh /r̥/	r /r/	r /r/	r /r/	r /r/	r /r/
s /s/	h /h/				h /h/
h /h/	ch /χ/	ch /χ/	ch /χ/	ch /χ/	ch /χ/
hw /ʍ/	chw /χw/	chw /χw/	chw /χw/	chw /χw/	chw /χw/

The nasal mutation however does not affect 'd' and 'g' when found in the clusters 'dr', 'gr', 'gl' or 'gw'. By Salo's admission, the liquid mutation is speculative and not attested in Tolkien's writings at the time he wrote A Gateway to Sindarin.

=== Pronouns ===
One source is used for the Sindarin pronouns, (Note: Tolkien 2007, p. 132.) another for the possessive suffixes.

Pronoun
		singular	dual (Note: used only by speakers from Doriath)	plural
1st person	exclusive	-n	-nc, -ngid	-nc
1st person	inclusive	-n	-m, -mmid	-m
2nd person	imperious/familiar	-g	-ch	-g, -gir
2nd person	formal/polite	-dh	-dh, -dhid	-dh, -dhir
3rd person		nil	-st	-r

Possessive suffix
		singular	plural
1st person	exclusive	-en	-enc
1st person	inclusive	-en	-em
2nd person	imperious/familiar	-eg	-eg, -egir
2nd person	formal/polite	-el	-el, -elir
3rd person		-ed	-ent

These are subjective forms used in conjugation. Sindarin used objective detached forms, like dhe (2nd pers. formal/polite singular).

Sindarin pronouns could combine with prepositions as in Celtic languages, Welsh: inni "to/for us" from i 'to/for' and ni 'we/us'. annin "for/to me". (Note: Tolkien 2007, p. 147) The first person singular pronoun suffixes could combine with nouns: Lamm, "tongue" > lammen "my tongue".

=== Verbs ===
Tolkien wrote that Quenya inflections were pretty regular, (Note: Tolkien, J. R. R., "Early Qenya Grammar", Parma Eldalamberon 14, p. 56.) but that "Sindarin verbal history is complicated." About -ant, the 3rd person past tense ending of Sindarin, he wrote: "it is rather like that of Medieval Welsh -as, or modern Welsh [3p sing.] -odd." So with teith- "make marks of signs, write, inscribe", teithant is the 3rd person singular past tense. Cf. Welsh chwaraeodd ef, "he played" (< chwarae 'to play' + -odd and ef 'he'). -ant is the Welsh 3p plural ending: chwaraeant hwy 'they (will) play'.

==== Basic verbs ====
Basic verbs form the infinitive by adding -i: giri from gir-. This ending causes an a or o in the stem to umlaut to e: blebi from blab-. The infinitive is not used as a noun; the gerund is used instead.

For all persons except the third person singular, the present tense is formed by the insertion of -i, and the proper enclitic pronominal ending: girin, girim, girir. As with the infinitive, -i causes an a or o in the stem to umlaut to e: pedin, pedim, pedir, from pad-. The third person singular, because it has a zero-ending, does not require the insertion of -i. This leaves the bare stem, which, because of Sindarin's phonological history, causes the vowel of the stem to become long: gîr, blâb, pâd.

The past tense of basic verbs is very complicated and poorly attested. One common reconstructed system is to use -n: darn. However, the only time this -n actually remains is after a stem in -r. After a stem ending in -l, -n becomes -ll: toll. After -b, -d, -g, -v, or -dh, it is metathesized and then assimilated to the same place of articulation as the consonant it now precedes. The consonant then experiences what could be called a "backwards mutation": -b, -d, and -g become -p, -t, and -c, and -v and -dh become -m and -d. The matter is complicated even further when pronominal endings are added. Because -mp, -mb, -nt, -nd, and -nc did not survive medially, they become -mm-, -mm-, -nn-, -nn-, and -ng. In addition, past tense stems in -m would have -mm- before any pronominal endings. These examples show the transformations step-by-step:

- cab- > **cabn > **canb > **camb > camp, becoming camm- with any pronominal endings.
- ped- > **pedn > **pend > pent, becoming penn- with any pronominal endings.
- dag- > **dagn > **dang (n pronounced as in men) > **dang (n pronounced as in sing) > danc, becoming dang- with any pronominal endings.
- lav- > **lavn > **lanv > **lanm > **lamm > lam, becoming lamm- before any pronominal endings.
- redh- > **redhn > **rendh > **rend > rend, becoming renn- before any pronominal endings.

The future tense is formed by the addition of -tha. An -i is also inserted between the stem and -tha, which again causes a and o to umlaut to e. Endings for all persons except for the first person singular can be added without any further modification: giritham, blebithar. The first person singular ending -n causes the -a in -tha to become -o: girithon, blebithon, pedithon.

The imperative is formed with the addition of -o to the stem: giro!, pado!, blabo!.

== Vocabulary ==
As of 2008, about 25,000 Elvish words have been published.

Meaning	Sindarin	Pronunciation	Quenya equivalent
earth	amar, ceven	[ˈamar] [ˈkɛvɛn]	ambar, cemen
sky	menel	[ˈmɛnɛl]	menel
water	nen	[ˈnɛn]	nén
fire	naur	[ˈnaʊ̯r]	nár
man (male)	benn	[ˈbɛnː]	nér
female	bess	[ˈbɛsː]	nís
eat	mad-	[ˈmad]	mat-
drink	sog-	[ˈsɔɡ]	suc-
big, great	beleg, daer	[ˈbɛlɛɡ] [ˈdaɛ̯r]	alta, halla
race, tribe	noss	[ˈnɔsː]	nóre
night	dû	[ˈduː]	lóme
day	aur	[ˈaʊ̯r]	aure, ré

The lexicons of Gnomish, Noldorin and Sindarin lack modern vocabulary (television, motor, etc.). Tolkien fans have extended Sindarin to enable it to be spoken.

=== Numerals ===
According to Tolkien, the elves preferred duodecimal counting (base 12) to the Dúnedain's decimal system (base 10: Quenya maquanotië, *quaistanótië), though the two systems seem to have coexisted. The numbers 1–12 are presented below (reconstructed forms are marked with an asterisk *), as well as a few higher numbers.

Cardinal numbers		Ordinal numbers	
Sindarin	English	Sindarin	English
er, min	one	mein, main, minui	first
tad	two	taid, tadui	second
neledh	three	neil, nail, nelui	third
canad	four	canthui	fourth
leben	five	levnui	fifth
eneg	six	enchui, enecthui	sixth
odo, odog	seven	othui, odothui	seventh
tolodh	eight	tollui	eighth
neder	nine	nedrui	ninth
pae or caer	ten	paenui or caenen	tenth
minib	eleven		
ýneg	twelve		
*nelphae	thirty		
host	one hundred and forty-four (gross)		
*meneg	thousand		

The form *nelchaen (extracted from nelchaenen) appears in the King's Letter, but at the time the roots for ten were KAYAN and KAYAR, resulting in Sindarin *caen, caer. This was later changed to KWAYA, KWAY-AM, resulting in Sindarin pae, so that this older form must be updated. The word *meneg is extracted from the name Menegroth, "the Thousand Caves", although this could technically be a base-12 "thousand" (i.e., 12^{3} or 1,728).

== Scholarship and fandom ==
Two magazines—Vinyar Tengwar, from issue 39 (July 1998), and Parma Eldalamberon, from issue 11 (1995)—are exclusively devoted to the editing and publishing of Tolkien's gigantic mass of unpublished linguistic papers. These are published at a slow pace and the editors have not published a comprehensive catalogue of these unpublished linguistic papers. Access to the original documents is severely limited as Christopher Tolkien omitted them from his 12-volume The History of Middle-earth. Many new-found words of Sindarin, Noldorin and Ilkorin have been published and the grammar rules of these languages disclosed.

Attempts by Tolkien fans to write in Sindarin began in the 1970s, when the total corpus of published Elvish was only a few hundred words. Since then, usage of Elvish has flourished in poems and texts, phrases and names, and tattoos. But Tolkien himself never intended to make his languages complete enough for conversation; as a result, newly invented Elvish texts, such as dialogue written by the linguist David Salo to be sung to the musical score for Peter Jackson's Lord of the Rings films, require conjecture and sometimes coinage of new words.
