= Tengwar =

Fictional script in Tolkien's writings

- The word "Tengwar" written using the Tengwar script in the Quenya mode
- Script type: Alternative abugida or alphabet according to the "mode"
- Creator: J. R. R. Tolkien
- Period: 1930s–present
- Direction: Left-to-right
- Languages: a number of Tolkien's constructed languages, Quenya and Sindarin, English

Related scripts
- Parent systems: Sarati: Tengwar

ISO 15924
- ISO 15924: Teng (290), Tengwar

The Tengwar (/ˈtɛŋɡwɑːr/) script is an artificial script, one of several scripts created by J. R. R. Tolkien, the author of The Lord of the Rings. Within the context of Tolkien's fictional world, the Tengwar were invented by the Elf Fëanor, and used first to write the Elvish languages Quenya and Telerin. Later a great number of Tolkien's constructed languages were written using the Tengwar, including Sindarin. Tolkien used Tengwar to write English: most of Tolkien's Tengwar samples are actually in English.

== External history ==
=== Precursors ===
The sarati, a script developed by Tolkien in the late 1910s and described in Parma Eldalamberon 13, anticipates many features of the Tengwar: vowel representation by diacritics (which is found in many Tengwar varieties); different Tengwar shapes; and a few correspondences between sound features and letter shape features (though inconsistent).

Even closer to the Tengwar is the Valmaric script, described in Parma Eldalamberon 14, which Tolkien used from about 1922 to 1925. It features many Tengwar shapes, the inherent vowel [a] found in some Tengwar varieties, and the tables in the samples V12 and V13 show an arrangement that is very similar to one of the primary Tengwar in the classical Quenya "mode".

In his An Introduction to Elvish, Jim Allan compared the Tengwar with the London merchant Francis Lodwick's 1686 Universal Alphabet, both on grounds of the correspondence between shape features and sound features, and of the actual letter shapes.

=== Tengwar ===
The two-line inscription on the One Ring, written in the Black Speech of Mordor using Tengwar: "Ash nazg durbatulûk, ash nazg gimbatul / ash nazg thrakatulûk, agh burzum-ishi krimpatul".

Tengwar "atul" element recurring in the ring inscription

The Tengwar script was probably developed in the late 1920s or in the early 1930s. The Lonely Mountain Jar Inscription, the first published Tengwar sample, dates to 1937. The full explanation of the Tengwar was published in Appendix E of The Lord of the Rings in 1955.

The Mellonath Daeron Index of Tengwar Specimina (DTS) lists most of the known samples of Tengwar by Tolkien. There are only a few known samples predating publication of The Lord of the Rings (many of them published posthumously):

- The Lonely Mountain Jar Inscription, published 1937
- Middle Page from the Book of Mazarbul
- Last Page from the Book of Mazarbul, Last Line, this and the above one originally prepared for inclusion in The Lord of the Rings
- Steinborg Drawing Title
- Ilbereth's Greeting from The Father Christmas Letters, dating to 1937
- The Treebeard Page
- Edwin Lowdham's Manuscript from The Notion Club Papers has Old English language text written in Tengwar (with a few Adûnaic and Quenya words), dating to 1945/6.
- The Brogan Tengwa-greetings, appearing in The Letters of J. R. R. Tolkien, No. 118, tentatively dated to 1948

The following samples presumably predate The Lord of the Rings, but were not explicitly dated:

- Elvish Script Sample I, II, III, with parts of the English poems Errantry and Bombadil, first published in the Silmarillion Calendar 1978, later in Pictures by J. R. R. Tolkien,
- So Lúthien, a page of the English Lay of Leithian text

== Internal history and terminology ==
Within the context of Tolkien's fictional world, the Tengwar were invented by the Elf Fëanor in Valinor, and used first to write the Elven tongues Quenya and Telerin. According to J. R. R. Tolkien's The War of the Jewels, at the time Fëanor created his script, he introduced a change in terminology. He called a letter, a written representation of a spoken phoneme (tengwë), a tengwa. Previously, any letter or symbol had been called a sarat (from *sar 'incise'). The alphabet of Rúmil of Tirion, on which Fëanor supposedly based his own work, was known as Sarati. It later became known as "Tengwar of Rúmil".

The plural of tengwa is tengwar, and this is the name by which Fëanor's writing system became known. Since, however, in commonly used modes, an individual tengwa was equivalent to a consonant, the term tengwa in the fiction became equivalent to "consonant sign", and the vowel signs were known as ómatehtar. By loan-translation, the Tengwar became known as tîw (singular têw) in Sindarin, when they were introduced to Beleriand. The letters of the earlier alphabet native to Sindarin were called cirth (singular certh, probably from *kirte 'cutting', and thus semantically analogous to Quenya sarat). This term was loaned into exilic Quenya as certa, plural certar.

== Description ==
Tengwar alphabet with the name of each tengwa, arranged phonetically according to the Quenya mode

=== Letters ===
The most notable characteristic of the Tengwar script is that the shapes of the letters correspond to the distinctive features of the sounds they represent. The Quenya consonant system has five places of articulation: labial, dental, palatal, velar, and glottal. The velars distinguish between plain and labialized (that is, articulated with rounded lips, or followed by a [w] sound). Each point of articulation, and the corresponding tengwa series, has a name in the classical Quenya mode. Dental sounds are called tincotéma and are represented with the Tengwar in column I. Labial sounds are called parmatéma, and represented by the column II Tengwar; velar sounds are called calmatéma, represented by column III; and labialized velar sounds are called quessetéma, represented by the Tengwar of column IV. Palatal sounds are called tyelpetéma and have no tengwa series of their own, but are represented by column III letters with an added diacritic for following [j].

Similarly shaped letters reflect not only similar places of articulation, but also similar manners of articulation. In the classical Quenya mode, row 1 represents voiceless stops, row 2 voiced prenasalized stops, row 3 voiceless fricatives, row 4 voiceless prenasalized stops, row 5 nasal stops, and row 6 approximants.

==== Regularly formed ====
Most letters are constructed by a combination of two basic shapes: a vertical stem (either long or short) and either one or two rounded bows (which may or may not be underscored, and may be on the left or right of the stem).

These principal letters are divided into four series (témar) that correspond to the main places of articulation and into six grades (tyeller) that correspond to the main manners of articulation. Both vary among modes.

Each series is headed by the basic signs composed of a vertical stem descending below the line, and a single bow. These basic signs represent the voiceless stop consonants for that series. For the classical Quenya mode, they are /t/, /p/, /k/ and /kʷ/, and the series are named tincotéma, parmatéma, calmatéma, and quessetéma, respectively; téma means "series" in Quenya.

In rows of the general use, there are the following correspondences between letter shapes and manners of articulation:

- Doubling the bow turns the voiceless consonant into a voiced one.
- Raising the stem above the line turns it into the corresponding fricative.
- Shortening it (so it is only the height of the bow) creates the corresponding nasal. In most modes, the signs with shortened stem and single bow do not correspond to the voiceless nasals, but to the approximants.

In addition to these variations of the Tengwar shapes, there is yet another variation, the use of stems that are extended both above and below the line. This shape may correspond to other consonant variations required. Except for some English abbreviations, it is not used in any of the better known Tengwar modes, but it occurs in a Quenya mode where the tengwa Parma with extended stem is used for /pt/ and the tengwa Calma with extended stem is used for /kt/. The Tengwar with raised stems sometimes occur in glyph variants that look like extended stems, as seen in the inscription of the One Ring.

An example from the parmatéma (the signs with a closed bow on the right side) in the "general use" of the Tengwar is:

- The basic sign, named parma, (with descending stem) represents /p/ (it happens to look much like the Latin letter P).
- With the bow doubled, umbar, it represents /b/.
- With a raised stem, formen, it represents /f/.
- With a raised stem and a doubled bow, ampa, it represents generally /v/ but possibly /mp/ (depending upon the language).
- With a short stem and double bow, malta, it represents /m/.
- With short stem and single bow, vala, it represents /w/, or /v/ if that has the phonological behaviour of a sonorant (e.g. in Quenya).

In languages such as Quenya, which do not contain any voiced fricatives other than "v", the raised stem + doubled bow row is used for the common nasal+stop sequences (nt, mp, nk, nqu). In such cases, the "w" sign in the previous paragraph is used for "v". In the mode of Beleriand, found on the door to Moria, the bottom tyellë is used for nasals (e.g., vala is used for /m/) and the fifth tyellë for doubled nasals (malta for /mm/).

==== Irregularly formed ====
There are additional letters that do not have regular shapes. They may represent, e.g., /r/, /l/, /s/ and /h/. Their use varies considerably from mode to mode. Some aficionados have added more letters not found in Tolkien's writings for use in their modes.

=== Tehtar diacritics ===
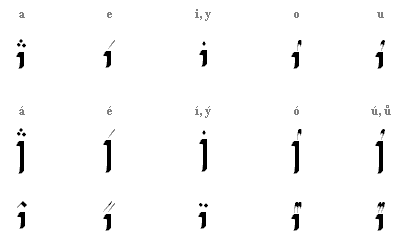
Tehtar diacritics for vowels

A tehta (Quenya 'marking') is a diacritic placed above or below the tengwa. They can represent vowels, consonant doubling, or nasal sound.

As Tolkien explained in Appendix E of The Lord of the Rings, the tehtar for vowels resemble Latin diacritics: circumflex (î) /a/, acute (í) /e/, dot (i) /i/, left curl (ı̔) /o/, and right curl (ı̓) /u/. Long vowels, excepting /a/, may be indicated by doubling the signs. Some languages from which /o/ is absent or in which compared to /u/ it appears sparsely, such as the Black Speech, use left curl for /u/; other languages swap the signs for /e/ and /i/.

A vowel occurring alone is drawn on the vowel carrier, which resembles dotless i (ı) for a short vowel or dotless j (ȷ) for a long vowel.

== Modes ==
Three modes of Tengwar Yellow: Classical mode Pink: Mode of Beleriand Grey: General mode

Just as with any alphabetic writing system, every specific language written in Tengwar requires a specific orthography, depending on the phonology of that language. These Tengwar orthographies are usually called modes. Some modes follow pronunciation, while others follow traditional orthography.

Some modes map the basic consonants to /t/, /p/, /k/ and /kʷ/ (classical mode in chart at right), while others use them to represent /t/, /p/, /tʃ/ and /k/ (general mode at right). The other main difference is in the fourth tyellë below, where those letters with raised stems and doubled bows can be either voiced fricatives, as in Sindarin (general mode at right), or nasalized stops, as in Quenya (classical mode).

=== Ómatehtar ===
In some modes, called ómatehtar (or vowel tehtar) modes, the vowels are represented with diacritics called tehtar (Quenya for 'signs'; corresponding singular: tehta, 'sign'). These ómatehtar modes can be considered abugidas rather than true alphabets. In some ómatehtar modes, the consonant signs feature an inherent vowel.

Ómatehtar modes can vary in that the vowel stroke can be placed either on top of the consonant preceding it, as in Quenya, or on the consonant following, as in Sindarin, English, and the notorious Black Speech inscription on the One Ring.

=== Full writing ===
In the full writing modes, the consonants and the vowels are represented by Tengwar. Only one such mode is well known. It is called the "mode of Beleriand" and one can read it on the Doors of Durin.

=== Modes for other languages ===
Since the publication of the first official description of the Tengwar at the end of The Lord of the Rings, others have created modes for other languages such as English, Spanish, German, Swedish, French, Finnish, Italian, Hungarian and Welsh. Modes have also been devised for the constructed languages Esperanto and Lojban.

Tolkien had used multiple modes for English, including full writing and ómatehtar alphabetic modes, phonetic full modes and phonetic ómatehtar modes known from documents published after his death.

== Encoding schemes ==
=== Legacy encoding ===
The contemporary de facto standard in the Tengwar user community maps the Tengwar characters onto the ISO 8859-1 character encoding following the example of the Tengwar typefaces by Dan Smith. This implies a major flaw: If no corresponding Tengwar font is installed, a string of nonsense characters appears.

Since there are not enough places in ISO 8859-1's 191 codepoints for all the signs used in Tengwar orthography, certain signs are included in a "Tengwar A" font which also maps its characters on ISO 8859-1, overlapping with the first font.

For each Tengwar diacritic, there are four different codepoints that are used depending on the width of the character which bears it.

Other Tengwar typefaces with this encoding include Johan Winge's Tengwar Annatar, Måns Björkman's Tengwar Parmaitë, Enrique Mombello's Tengwar Élfica or Michal Nowakowski's Tengwar Formal (note that these differ in some details).

The following sample shows the first article of the Universal Declaration of Human Rights written in English, according to the traditional English orthography.

First article of the Universal Declaration of Human Rights in English, written with a spelling-based pointed mode of Tengwar. The first three lines: "All human beings are / born free and equal / in dignity and rights. /..."

=== Unicode ===
Michael Everson made a proposal to include the Tengwar in the Unicode standard in 1997. The range U+16080 to U+160FF in the SMP was tentatively allocated for Tengwar in the 2023 Unicode roadmap, but has since been deleted.

=== ConScript Unicode Registry ===
Tengwar
- Range: U+E000..U+E07F (128 code points)
- Plane: BMP
- Scripts: Artificial Scripts
- Major alphabets: Tengwar
- Assigned: 0 code points
- Unused: 128 reserved code points
- Source standards: CSUR
- Note: Part of the Private-Use Area, font conflicts possible

Tengwar are included in the unofficial ConScript Unicode Registry (CSUR), which assigns codepoints in the Private Use Area. Tengwar are mapped to the range U+E000–U+E07F. However, the encoding order was never standardized, with two competing proposals.

Some typefaces that support one or the other of these proposals are Everson Mono, Tengwar Telcontar, Constructium, Tengwar Formal Unicode, and FreeMonoTengwar (James Kass's Code2000 and Code2001 use an older, incompatible version of the proposal). The eight “Aux” variant fonts of Kurinto (such as Kurinto Text Aux, Book Aux, Sans Aux) also support Tengwar.

Tengwar^{[1]}^{[2]} ConScript Unicode Registry
	0	1	2	3	4	5	6	7	8	9	A	B	C	D	E	F
U+E00x																
U+E01x																
U+E02x																
U+E03x																
U+E04x																
U+E05x																
U+E06x																
U+E07x																
Notes: 1. Proposals 1993-05-09, 1996-09-15; revision 1998-01-10; 2.Grey areas indicate non-assigned code points

Tengwar^{[1]}^{[2]} ConScript Unicode Registry, 2001 draft proposal
	0	1	2	3	4	5	6	7	8	9	A	B	C	D	E	F
U+E00x																
U+E01x																
U+E02x																
U+E03x																
U+E04x																
U+E05x																
U+E06x																
U+E07x																
Notes: 1. Proposal 2001-03-07; 2.Grey areas indicate non-assigned code points

Tengwar letters CSUR encoding
Name	Image	CSUR	Designation annotation
tinco	tinco	U+E000	Tengwar LETTER TINCO
parma	parma	U+E001	Tengwar LETTER PARMA
calma	calma	U+E002	Tengwar LETTER CALMA
quessë	quessë	U+E003	Tengwar LETTER QUESSE
ando	ando	U+E004	Tengwar LETTER ANDO
umbar	umbar	U+E005	Tengwar LETTER UMBAR
anga	anga	U+E006	Tengwar LETTER ANGA
ungwë	ungwë	U+E007	Tengwar LETTER UNGWE
súlë / thúlë	súlë / thúlë	U+E008	Tengwar LETTER THUULE (suule)
formen	formen	U+E009	Tengwar LETTER FORMEN
harma / aha	harma / aha	U+E00A	Tengwar LETTER HARMA (aha)
hwesta	hwesta	U+E00B	Tengwar LETTER HWESTA
anto	anto	U+E00C	Tengwar LETTER ANTO
ampa	ampa	U+E00D	Tengwar LETTER AMPA
anca	anca	U+E00E	Tengwar LETTER ANCA
unquë	unquë	U+E00F	Tengwar LETTER UNQUE
númen	númen	U+E010	Tengwar LETTER NUUMEN
malta	malta	U+E011	Tengwar LETTER MALTA
noldo / ñoldo	noldo / ñoldo	U+E012	Tengwar LETTER NOLDO (ngoldo)
nwalmë / ñwalmë	nwalmë / ñwalmë	U+E013	Tengwar LETTER NWALME (ngwalme)
órë	órë	U+E014	Tengwar LETTER OORE
vala	vala	U+E015	Tengwar LETTER VALA
anna	anna	U+E016	Tengwar LETTER ANNA
vilya / wilya	vilya / wilya	U+E017	Tengwar LETTER VILYA (wilya)
rómen	rómen	U+E018	Tengwar LETTER ROOMEN
arda	arda	U+E019	Tengwar LETTER ARDA
lambë	lambë	U+E01A	Tengwar LETTER LAMBE
alda	alda	U+E01B	Tengwar LETTER ALDA
silmë	silmë	U+E01C	Tengwar LETTER SILME
silmë nuquerna	silmë nuquerna	U+E01D	Tengwar LETTER SILME NUQUERNA
essë / áre/áze	essë / áre/áze	U+E01E	Tengwar LETTER AARE (aaze, esse)
essë nuquerna / áre/áze nuquerna	essë nuquerna / áre/áze nuquerna	U+E01F	Tengwar LETTER AARE NUQUERNA (aaze n., esse n.)
hyarmen	hyarmen	U+E020	Tengwar LETTER HYARMEN
hwesta sindarinwa	hwesta sindarinwa	U+E021	Tengwar LETTER HWESTA SINDARINWA
yanta	yanta	U+E022	Tengwar LETTER YANTA
úrë	úrë	U+E023	Tengwar LETTER UURE
halla	halla	U+E024	Tengwar LETTER HALLA
telco	telco	U+E025	Tengwar LETTER SHORT CARRIER
ára	ára	U+E026	Tengwar LETTER LONG CARRIER

Tengwar ligatures and extended letters CSUR encoding
Name	Image	CSUR	Designation annotation
		U+E027	Tengwar LETTER ANNA SINDARINWA
		U+E028	Tengwar LETTER EXTENDED THUULE
		U+E029	Tengwar LETTER EXTENDED FORMEN
		U+E02A	Tengwar LETTER EXTENDED HARMA
		U+E02B	Tengwar LETTER EXTENDED HWESTA
		U+E02C	Tengwar LETTER EXTENDED ANTO
		U+E02D	Tengwar LETTER EXTENDED AMPA
		U+E02E	Tengwar LETTER EXTENDED ANCA
		U+E02F	Tengwar LETTER EXTENDED UNQUE
		U+E030	Tengwar LETTER STEMLESS OORE (digit zero)
		U+E031	Tengwar LETTER STEMLESS VALA
		U+E032	Tengwar LETTER STEMLESS ANNA
		U+E033	Tengwar LETTER STEMLESS VILYA (digit one)

Tengwar accents CSUR encoding
Name	Image	CSUR	Designation annotation
amatixe 3	amatixe 3	U+E040	Tengwar SIGN THREE DOTS ABOVE
unutixe 3		U+E041	Tengwar SIGN THREE DOTS BELOW
amatixe 2	amatixe 2	U+E042	Tengwar SIGN TWO DOTS ABOVE
unutixe 2	unutixe 2	U+E043	Tengwar SIGN TWO DOTS BELOW
amatixe 1	amatixe 1	U+E044	Tengwar SIGN AMATICSE (dot above)
unutixe 1	unutixe 1	U+E045	Tengwar SIGN NUNTICSE (dot below)
tecco	tecco	U+E046	Tengwar SIGN ACUTE (andaith, long mark)
		U+E047	Tengwar SIGN DOUBLE ACUTE
rempe	rempe	U+E048	Tengwar SIGN RIGHT CURL
		U+E049	Tengwar SIGN DOUBLE RIGHT CURL
rempenuquerna	rempenuquerna	U+E04A	Tengwar SIGN LEFT CURL
		U+E04B	Tengwar SIGN DOUBLE LEFT CURL
amatwe	amatwe	U+E04C	Tengwar SIGN NASALIZER
unuatwe	unuatwe	U+E04D	Tengwar SIGN DOUBLER
		U+E04E	Tengwar SIGN TILDE
		U+E04F	Tengwar SIGN BREVE
		U+E050	Tengwar PUSTA (putta, stop)
		U+E051	Tengwar DOUBLE PUSTA (putta)
		U+E052	Tengwar EXCLAMATION MARK
		U+E053	Tengwar QUESTION MARK
		U+E054	Tengwar SECTION MARK
		U+E055	Tengwar LONG SECTION MARK
thinnas	thinnas	U+E056	Tengwar SIGN LONG CARRIER BELOW
		U+E057	Tengwar SIGN DOUBLE ACUTE BELOW
		U+E058	Tengwar SIGN RIGHT CURL BELOW
		U+E05A	Tengwar SIGN LEFT CURL BELOW
sarince	sarince	U+E05C	Tengwar SIGN LEFT FOLLOWING SILME
		U+E05D	Tengwar SIGN RIGHT FOLLOWING SILME

Tengwar digits CSUR encoding
Name	Image	CSUR	Designation annotation
0		U+E030	Tengwar LETTER STEMLESS OORE (digit zero)
1		U+E033	Tengwar LETTER STEMLESS VILYA (digit one)
2		U+E062	Tengwar DIGIT TWO
3		U+E063	Tengwar DIGIT THREE
4		U+E064	Tengwar DIGIT FOUR
5		U+E065	Tengwar DIGIT FIVE
6		U+E066	Tengwar DIGIT SIX
7		U+E067	Tengwar DIGIT SEVEN
8		U+E068	Tengwar DIGIT EIGHT
9		U+E069	Tengwar DIGIT NINE
10		U+E06A	Tengwar DUODECIMAL DIGIT TEN
11		U+E06B	Tengwar DUODECIMAL DIGIT ELEVEN
		U+E06C	Tengwar DECIMAL BASE MARK
		U+E06D	Tengwar DUODECIMAL BASE MARK
		U+E06E	Tengwar DUODECIMAL LEAST SIGNIFICANT DIGIT MARK

== In popular culture ==
Tengwar has been used in Tolkien fandom since the publication of The Lord of the Rings in the 1950s.

With the exception of John Rhys-Davies, the actors playing the Fellowship of the Ring in The Lord of the Rings film trilogy have Tengwar tattoos of the English word nine.

Footballers such as Sergio Agüero and Fernando Torres have tattoos with their first name in Tengwar on their forearms.

== See also ==
- Cirth
- A Elbereth Gilthoniel
- Elvish languages (Middle-earth)
- Namárië

== Sources ==
For a list of linguistic material by Tolkien published in the journals Parma Eldalamberon and Vinyar Tengwar, see bibliography in Elvish languages (Middle-earth).

- Derzhanski, Ivan A. "The Fëanorian Tengwar and the Typology of Phonetic Writing Systems." Vinyar Tengwar 41 (2000): 20–23.
- Hammond, Wayne G.; Scull, Christina (2005). The Lord of the Rings: A Reader's Companion. London: HarperCollins. ISBN 0-00-720907-X.
- Hostetter, Carl F. ""Si man i-yulmar n(g)win enquatuva": A Newly-Discovered Tengwar Inscription." Vinyar Tengwar 21 (1992): 6–10.
- Smith, Arden R., Irmengard Rauch and Gerald F. Carr. "The Semiotics of the Writing Systems of Tolkien's Middle-earth." In Semiotics around the World: Synthesis in Diversity, I-II, ed. Irmengard Rauch, 1239–42. Berlin, Germany: Mouton de Gruyter, 1997.
