= Cirth =

Artificial script in Tolkien's writings

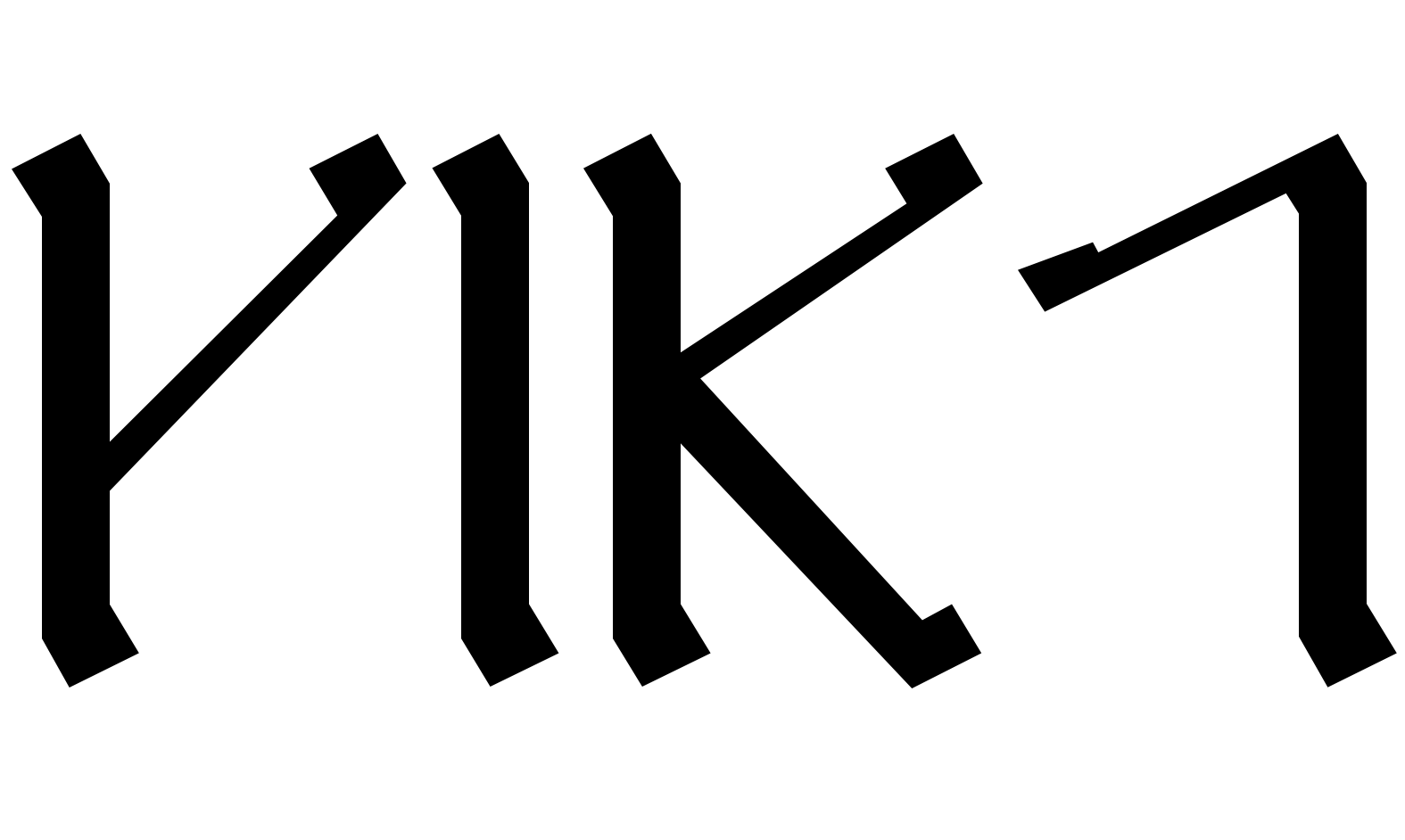
- The word "Cirth" written using the Cirth in the Angerthas Daeron mode
- Script type: Alphabet
- Creator: J. R. R. Tolkien
- Direction: Varies
- Languages: Khuzdul, Sindarin, Quenya, Westron, English

ISO 15924
- ISO 15924: Cirt (291), Cirth

The Cirth (Sindarin pronunciation: [ˈkirθ], meaning "runes"; sg. certh [ˈkɛrθ]) is a semi‑artificial script, based on real‑life runic alphabets, one of several scripts invented by J. R. R. Tolkien for the constructed languages he devised and used in his works. Cirth is written with a capital letter when referring to the writing system; the letters themselves can be called cirth.

In the fictional history of Middle-earth, the original Certhas was created by the Sindar (or Grey Elves) for their language, Sindarin. Its extension and elaboration was known as the Angerthas Daeron, as it was attributed to the Sinda Daeron, despite the fact that it was most probably arranged by the Noldor in order to represent the sounds of other languages like Quenya and Telerin.

Although it was later largely replaced by the Tengwar, the Cirth was nonetheless adopted by the Dwarves to write down both their Khuzdul language (Angerthas Moria) and the languages of Men (Angerthas Erebor). The Cirth was also adapted, in its oldest and simplest form, by various races including Men and even Orcs.

== External history ==
=== Concept and creation ===
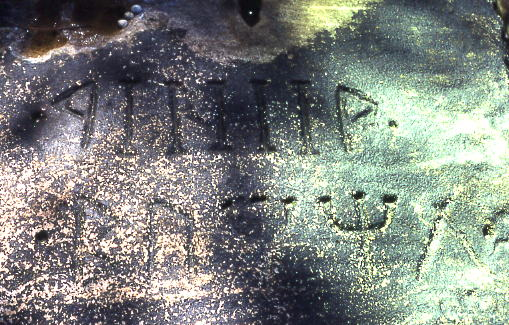
Rock carving in Cirth in the Sydney Harbour National Park, dating back to the 1980s at least

Many letters have shapes also found in the historical runic alphabets, but their sound values are only similar in a few of the vowels. Rather, the system of assignment of sound values is much more systematic in the Cirth than in the historical runes (e.g., voiced variants of a voiceless sound are expressed by an additional stroke).

The division between the older Cirth of Daeron and their adaptation by Dwarves and Men has been interpreted as a parallel drawn by Tolkien to the development of the Futhorc to the Younger Futhark. The original Elvish Cirth "as supposed products of a superior culture" are focused on logical arrangement and a close connection between form and value whereas the adaptations by mortal races introduced irregularities. Similar to the Germanic tribes who had no written literature and used only simple runes before their conversion to Christianity, the Sindarin Elves of Beleriand with their Cirth were introduced to the more elaborate Tengwar of Fëanor when the Noldorin Elves returned to Middle-earth from the lands of the divine Valar.

== Internal history and description ==
=== Certhas ===
In the Appendix E to The Return of the King, Tolkien writes that the Sindar of Beleriand first developed an alphabet for their language some time between the invention of the Tengwar by Fëanor (YT 1250) and the introduction thereof to Middle-earth by the Exiled Noldor towards the end of the First Age.

This alphabet was devised to represent only the sounds of their Sindarin language and its letters were mostly used for inscribing names or brief memorials on wood, stone or metal, hence their angular shapes and straight lines. In Sindarin these letters were named cirth (sing. certh), from the Elvish root *kir- meaning "to cleave, to cut". An abecedarium of cirth, consisting of the runes listed in due order, was commonly known as Certhas ([ˈkɛrθɑs], meaning "rune-rows" in Sindarin and loosely translated as "runic alphabet").

The oldest cirth were the following:

Consonants	p	b	mh	m	
Consonants	t	d	n		
Consonants	k	g	ng		
Consonants	r	l	~ h or s	s or h	ss
Vowels	i	u	e	o	

The form of these letters was somewhat unsystematic, unlike later rearrangements and extensions that made them more featural. The cirth and were used for ⟨h⟩ and ⟨s⟩, but varied as to which was which. Many of the runes consisted of a single vertical line (or "stem") with an appendage (or "branch") attached to one or both sides. If the attachment was made on one side only, it was usually to the right, but "the reverse was not infrequent" and did not change the value of the letter. (For example, the variants or specifically mentioned for h or s, also or for t, etc.).

=== Mode of Daeron ===
In Beleriand, before the end of the First Age, the Certhas was rearranged and further developed, partly under the influence of the Tengwar introduced by the Noldor. This reorganisation of the Cirth was commonly attributed to the Elf Daeron, minstrel and loremaster of King Thingol of Doriath. Thus, the new system became known as the mode of Daeron.

In this arrangement, the assignment of values to each certh is systematic. The runes consisting of a stem and a branch attached to the right are used for voiceless stops, while other sounds are allocated according to the following principles:

1. adding a stroke to a branch adds voice (e.g., [p] → [b]);
2. moving the branch to the left indicates opening to a spirant (e.g., [t] → [θ]);
3. placing the branch on both sides of the stem adds voice and nasality (e.g., [k] → [ŋ]).

The cirth constructed in this way can therefore be arranged into series, each corresponding to a place of articulation:

- labial consonants, based on;
- dental consonants, based on;
- front consonants, based on;
- velar consonants, based on;
- labialized velar consonants, based on.

Other letters introduced in this system include: and for ⟨a⟩ and ⟨w⟩, respectively; runes for long vowels, evidently originated by doubling and binding the certh of the corresponding short vowel (e.g., ⟨oo⟩ → ⟨ō⟩); two front vowels, probably stemming from ligatures of the corresponding back vowel with the ⟨i⟩-certh (i.e., → ⟨ü⟩, and → ⟨ö⟩); some homorganic nasal + stop clusters (e.g., [nd]).

Back to the fictional history, since the new -series and -series encompass sounds which do not occur in Sindarin but are present in Quenya, they were most probably introduced by the Exiled Noldor who spoke Quenya as a language of knowledge.

By loan-translation, the Cirth became known in Quenya as Certar [ˈkɛrtar], while a single certh was called certa [ˈkɛrta].

After the Tengwar became the sole script used for writing, the mode of Daeron was essentially relegated to carved inscriptions. The Elves of the West, for the most part, abandoned the Cirth altogether, with the exception of the Noldor dwelling in the country of Eregion, who maintained it in use and made it known as the mode of Eregion.

Note: In this article, the runes come with the same peculiar transliteration used by Tolkien in the Appendix E, which differs from the (Latin) spelling of both Quenya and Sindarin. The IPA transcription that follows is applicable to both languages, except where indicated otherwise.

Regularly formed cirth
Labial consonants	Certh							
Labial consonants	Translit.		p	b	f	v	m^{[i]}	mh, mb
Labial consonants	IPA		[p]	[b]	[f]	[v]	[m]	(S.) [ṽ] (Q.) [mb]
Dental consonants	Certh							or
Dental consonants	Translit.		t	d	th	dh	n	nd^{[ii]}
Dental consonants	IPA		[t]	[d]	[θ]	[ð]	[n]	[nd]
Front consonants^{[iii]}	Certh							
Front consonants^{[iii]}	Translit.		ch^{[iv]}	j^{[v]}	sh^{[vi]}	zh	nj^{[vii]}	
Front consonants^{[iii]}	IPA	(N.)	[c⁽^{ȷ̊}⁾]	[ɟj]	[ç]	[ʝ]	ɟ[ɲj] ← [ɲɟj]	
Front consonants^{[iii]}	IPA	(V.)	[t͡ʃ]	[d͡ʒ]	[ʃ]	[ʒ]		[nd͡ʒ]
Velar consonants	Certh							
Velar consonants	Translit.		k	g	kh	gh	ŋ	ng
Velar consonants	IPA		[k]	[ɡ]	[x]	[ɣ]	[ŋ]	[ŋɡ]
Labiovelar consonants	Certh							
Labiovelar consonants	Translit.		kw	gw	khw	ghw	nw^{[viii]}	ngw
Labiovelar consonants	IPA	(Q.)	[kʷ₍w̥₎]	[ɡʷw]	[ʍ]	[w]	[nʷw]←[ŋʷw]	[ŋɡʷw]

Additional cirth
Consonants	Certh					or		
Consonants	Translit.	r	rh	l	lh	s	ss or z^{[ix]}	h^{[x]}
Consonants	IPA	[r]	[r̥]	[l]	[l̥]	[s]	[sː] or [z]	[h]
Approximants	Certh							
Approximants	Translit.		w	hw^{[xi]}				
Approximants	IPA		[w]	[ʍ]				
Vowels	Certh							
Vowels	Translit.	i, y	u		e	a	o	
Vowels	IPA	[i], [j]	[u]		[e]	[a]	[o]	
Long vowels	Certh						or	
Long vowels	Translit.		ū		ē	ā	ō	
Long vowels	IPA		[uː]		[eː]	[aː]	[oː]	
Fronted vowels	Certh		or				or	
Fronted vowels	Translit.		ü				ö	
Fronted vowels	IPA		[y]				[œ]	

Notes:

1. According to the principles outlined above, the labial nasal would be assigned to the certh. However, archaic Sindarin had two labial nasals: the occlusive [m], and the spirant [ṽ] (spelt ⟨mh⟩). Since the ⟨mh⟩ sound could best be represented by a reversal of the sign for ⟨m⟩ (to indicate its spirantization), the reversible was given the value ⟨m⟩, and was assigned to ⟨mh⟩. The sound [ṽ] merged with [v] in later Sindarin.
2. The certh was not clearly related in shape to the dentals.
3. The -series, which represents the front consonants of Quenya, is essentially the Cirth counterpart to the Tengwar tyelpetéma (column III in the General Use).
  In this article, each certh of this series comes with two IPA transcriptions. The reason is that these consonants are realised as palatals in Noldorin Quenya, but as postalveolars in Vanyarin Quenya. Although the mode of Daeron was devised for the Noldorin variety, it is deemed necessary to show the Vanyarin pronunciation as well, given that the very transliteration used by Tolkien is more akin to the Vanyarin phonology.
4. The certh indicates Quenya ⟨ty⟩, which is pronounced [c^{⁽}ȷ̊^{⁾}] in Noldorin but is a voiceless postalveolar affricate [t͡ʃ] in Vanyarin.
5. The certh represents Quenya ⟨dy⟩, formerly pronounced [ɟj].
6. The certh stands for Quenya ⟨hy⟩, which is a voiceless palatal fricative [ç] in Noldorin and a voiceless postalveolar fricative [ʃ] in Vanyarin.
7. The certh denotes Quenya ⟨ndy⟩, formerly pronounced [ɲɟj]. In Noldorin, this cluster was later reduced to ⟨ny⟩ (articulated as [ɲj]). On the other hand, in Vanyarin, the cluster underwent assibilation, turning into [nd͡ʒ].
8. The certh , much like the tengwa "ñwalme", formerly represented Quenya ⟨ñw⟩ (pronounced [ŋʷw]), occurring only in initial position. This sound later evolved into [nʷw], explaining the transliteration of this certh as ⟨nw⟩. Non-initial occurrences of [nʷw] are most probably interpreted as ⟨n⟩+⟨w⟩ (i.e., two separate cirth).
9. The certh, the theoretical value of which is ⟨z⟩, is instead used as ⟨ss⟩ in both Quenya and Sindarin (cf. the tengwa "esse"/"áze").
10. The new certh was introduced for ⟨h⟩: it is similar in shape both to the certh (formerly used for ⟨h⟩, then reassigned to ⟨ty⟩) and to the tengwa "hyarmen".
11. The certh, the theoretical value of which was ⟨m⟩, was used for Sindarin ⟨hw⟩ for the reasons stated above (cf. the tengwa "hwesta sindarinwa").

=== Mode of Moria ===
According to Tolkien's legendarium, the Dwarves first came to know the runes of the Noldor at the beginning of the Second Age. The Dwarves "introduced a number of unsystematic changes in value, as well as certain new cirth". They modified the previous system to suit the specific needs of their language, Khuzdul. The Dwarves spread their revised alphabet to Moria, where as the mode of Moria it developed both carved and pen-written forms of these runes.

Many cirth here represent sounds not occurring in Khuzdul (at least in published words of Khuzdul: of course, our corpus is very limited to judge the necessity or not, of these sounds). Here they are marked with a black star (^{★}).

Certh	Translit.	IPA	Certh	Translit.	IPA	Certh	Translit.	IPA	Certh	Translit.	IPA
	p	/p/^{★}		Not used			l	/l/		e	/e/
	b	/b/		z	/z/		lh	/ɬ/^{★}		ê	/eː/
	f	/f/		k	/k/		nd	/nd/		a	/a/
	v	/v/^{★}		g	/ɡ/		h	/h/^{[A]}		â	/aː/
	hw	/ʍ/^{★}		kh	/x/^{★}		’	/ʔ/^{[A]}		o	/o/
	m	/m/		gh	/ɣ/^{★}		ŋ	/ŋ/^{★}		ô	/oː/
	mb	/mb/		n	/n/		ng	/ŋɡ/		ö	/œ/^{★}
	t	/t/		kw	/kʷ/^{★}		nj	/ndʒ/^{★}		n	/n/
	d	/d/		gw	/ɡʷ/^{★}		i	/i/		s	/s/
	th	/θ/^{★}		khw	/xʷ/^{★}		y	/j/		^{[B]}	/ə/
	dh	/ð/^{★}		ghw	/ɣʷ/^{★}		hy	/j̊, ç/^{★}		^{[B]}	/ʌ/
	r	/ʀ, ʁ, r/		ngw	/ŋɡʷ/^{★}		u	/u/			
	ch	/tʃ, c/^{★}		nw	/nʷ/^{★}		û	/uː/			
	Not used			j	/dʒ, ɟ/^{★}		w	/w/^{★}		+h^{[C]}	/◌ʰ/
	sh	/ʃ/		zh	/ʒ/^{★}		ü	/y/^{★}	^{∗}	&^{[D]}	

Notes:

A.	Khuzdul has two glottal consonants: /h/ and /ʔ/, the latter being "the glottal beginning of a word with an initial vowel". Thus needing a reversible certh for these sounds, and were switched, giving the former the value /s/ and using the latter for /h/, and its reversed counterpart for /ʔ/.
B.	These cirth are halved forms of, used for vowels like those in the word ⟨butter⟩ /ˈbʌtər/. Thus, represented a /ə/ sound in unstressed syllables, while represented /ʌ/, a somehow similar sound, in stressed syllables. When weak they were reduced to a stroke without a stem.
C.	This letter denotes aspiration in voiceless stops, occurring frequently in Khuzdul as kh and th.
D.	D scribal abbreviation to represent a conjunction, identical to the ampersand ⟨&⟩ in Latin script.

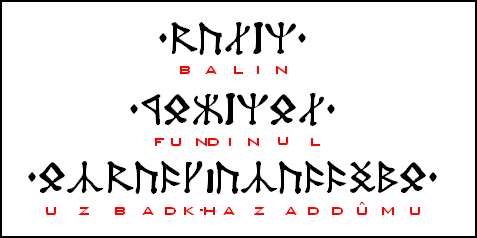
Runes in the upper inscription of Balin's tomb use the mode of Moria, reading left-to-right: Balin Fu[nd]inul UzbadKʰazaddûmu

The cirth and for /dʒ/ and /ʒ/ were changed to and respectively, replacing the Elvish usage of /r/ and /r̥/. The certh changes to /ʀ, ʁ/ from /n/. Certh changes to /n/ from /ŋ/ (a sound not in Khuzdul). The certh was made as a simplified alternative of. Because of the visual relation of these two cirth, the certh was given the sound /z/ to relate better with that became /s/.

=== Mode of Erebor ===
At the beginning of the Third Age the Dwarves were driven out of Moria, and some migrated to Erebor. As the Dwarves of Erebor would trade with the Men of the nearby towns of Dale and Lake-town, they needed a script to write in Westron (the lingua franca of Middle-earth, usually rendered in English by Tolkien in his works). The mode of Moria was adapted accordingly: some new cirth were added, while some were restored to their Elvish usage, thus creating the mode of Erebor.

While the Mode of Moria was still used to write down Khuzdul, this new script was primarily used for Mannish languages. It is also the script used in the first and third page of the Book of Mazarbul.

Certh	Translit.	IPA	Certh	Translit.	IPA	Certh	Translit.	IPA	Certh	Translit.	IPA
	p	/p/		zh	/ʒ/		l	/l/		e	/e/
	b	/b/		ks	/ks/						
	f	/f/		k	/k/		nd	/nd/		a	/a/
	v	/v/		g	/ɡ/		s	/s/			
	hw	/ʍ/		kh	/x/		s	/s/		o	/o/
	m	/m/		gh	/ɣ/		ŋ	/ŋ/			
	mb	/mb/		n	/n/		ng	/ŋɡ/		ö	/œ/
	t	/t/		kw	/kʷ/					n	/n/
	d	/d/		gw	/ɡʷ/		i	/i/		h	/h/
	th	/θ/		khw	/xʷ/		y	/j/			/ə/
	dh	/ð/		ghw	/ɣʷ/		hy	/j̊, ç/			/ʌ/
	r	/r/		ngw	/ŋɡʷ/		u	/u/	^{∗}	ps	/ps/
	ch	/tʃ/		nw	/nʷ/		z	/z/	^{∗}	ts	/ts/
	j	/dʒ/		g	/ɡ/		w	/w/		+h	/◌ʰ/
	sh	/ʃ/		gh	/ɣ/		ü	/y/		&	

Notes:

∗.	Cirth unique to the mode of Erebor.

The mode of Erebor features combining diacritics:

- a circumflex used to denote long consonants;
- a macron below to indicate a long vowel sound;
- an underdot to mark cirth used as numerals. As a matter of fact, in the Book of Mazarbul some cirth are used as numerals: for 1, for 2, for 3, for 4, for 5.

The bottom inscription of Balin's tomb is written in English using the mode of Erebor. It reads left-to-right: "Balin sʌn ov Fu[nd]in lord ov Moria"

The mode of Erebor is used twice in The Lord of the Rings to write in English:

1. in the upper inscription of the title page, where it reads "[dh]ə·lord·ov·[dh]ə·riŋs·translatᵊd·from·[dh]ə·red·b[oo]k..." (the sentence follows in the bottom inscription, written in Tengwar: "...of Westmarch by John Ronald Reuel Tolkien. Herein is set forth/ the history of the War of the Ring and the Return of the King as seen by the Hobbits.");
2. in the bottom inscription of Balin's tomb—being the translation of the upper inscription, which is written in Khuzdul using the mode of Moria.

The Book of Mazarbul shows some additional cirth used in the mode of Erebor: one for a double ⟨l⟩ ligature, one for the definite article, and six for the representation of the same number of English diphthongs:

Certh	English spelling
^{∗}	⟨ll⟩
^{∗}	⟨the⟩^{[A]}
^{∗}	⟨ai⟩, ⟨ay⟩
^{∗}	⟨au⟩, ⟨aw⟩
^{∗}	⟨ea⟩
	⟨ee⟩
	⟨eu⟩, ⟨ew⟩
^{∗}	⟨oa⟩
	⟨oo⟩
	⟨ou⟩, ⟨ow⟩

Notes:

A.	A scribal abbreviation for the definite article.
∗.	Cirth unique to the mode of Erebor.

== Other runic scripts by Tolkien ==
The Cirth is not the only runic writing system used by Tolkien in his legendarium. In fact, he devised a great number of runic alphabets, of which only a few others have been published. Some of these are included in the "Appendix on Runes" of The Treason of Isengard (The History of Middle-earth, vol. VII), edited by Christopher Tolkien.

=== Runes from The Hobbit ===
According to Tolkien himself, those found in The Hobbit are a form of "English runes" used in lieu of the Dwarvish runes proper. They can be interpreted as an attempt made by Tolkien to adapt the Fuþorc (i.e., the Old English runic alphabet) to the Modern English language.

These runes are basically the same found in Fuþorc, but their sound may change according to their position, just like the letters of the Latin script: the writing mode used by Tolkien is, in this case, mainly orthographic. This means that the system has one rune for each Latin letter, regardless of pronunciation. For example, the rune ⟨c⟩ can sound /k/ in ⟨cover⟩, /s/ in ⟨sincere⟩, /ʃ/ in ⟨special⟩, and even /tʃ/ in the digraph ⟨ch⟩.

A few sounds are instead written with the same rune, without considering the English spelling. For example, the sound /ɔː/ is always written with the rune whether in English it is spelt ⟨o⟩ as in ⟨north⟩, ⟨a⟩ as in ⟨fall⟩, or ⟨oo⟩ as in ⟨door⟩. The only two letters that are subject to this phonemic spelling are ⟨a⟩ and ⟨o⟩.

Finally, some runes stand for particular English digraphs and diphthongs.

Here the runes used in The Hobbit are displayed along with their Fuþorc counterpart and corresponding English grapheme:

Rune	Fuþorc	English grapheme	Rune	Fuþorc	English grapheme
	ᚪ	phonemic^{[i]}		ᚱ	⟨r⟩
	ᚫ	phonemic^{[i]}		ᛋ	⟨s⟩
	ᛒ	⟨b⟩		ᛏ	⟨t⟩
	ᚳ	⟨c⟩		ᚢ	⟨u⟩, ⟨v⟩
	ᛞ	⟨d⟩		ᚹ	⟨w⟩
	ᛖ	⟨e⟩		ᛉ	⟨x⟩
	ᚠ	⟨f⟩, ⟨ph⟩		ᚣ	⟨y⟩
	ᚷ	⟨g⟩		ᛣ	⟨z⟩^{[iii]}
	ᚻ	⟨h⟩		ᚦ	⟨th⟩
	ᛁ	⟨i⟩, ⟨j⟩		ᛠ	⟨ea⟩
	ᛱ ^{[ii]}	⟨k⟩		ᛥ	⟨st⟩
	ᛚ	⟨l⟩		ᛟ	⟨ee⟩
	ᛗ	⟨m⟩		ᛝ	⟨ng⟩
	ᚾ	⟨n⟩		ᛇ	⟨eo⟩
	ᚩ	phonemic^{[i]}		ᛳ ^{[ii]}	⟨oo⟩
	ᛈ	⟨p⟩		ᛲ ^{[ii]}	⟨sh⟩

Notes:

1. This table summarises the transcription of English ⟨a⟩ and ⟨o⟩ in runes:

English grapheme	Sound value (IPA)	Rune
⟨a⟩	/æ/	
⟨a⟩	every other sound	
⟨a⟩	/ɔː/	
⟨o⟩	every sound	
⟨oo⟩	/ɔː/	
⟨oo⟩	every other sound	

2. The three runes , , and were invented by Tolkien and are not attested in real-life Fuþorc.
3. According to Tolkien, this is a "dwarf-rune" which "may be used if required" as an addendum to the English runes.
4. Tolkien commonly writes the English digraph ⟨wh⟩ (pronounced [ʍ] in some varieties of English) as ⟨hw⟩.
5. There is no rune to transliterate ⟨q⟩: the digraph ⟨qu⟩ (representing the sound [kʷw], like in ⟨queen⟩) is always written as ⟨cw⟩, reflecting the Anglo-Saxon spelling ⟨cƿ⟩.

=== Gondolinic runes ===
Not all the runes mentioned in The Hobbit are Dwarf-runes. The swords found in the Trolls' cave bore runes that Gandalf could not read. In fact, the swords Glamdring and Orcrist (which were forged in the ancient kingdom of Gondolin) bore a type of letters known as Gondolinic runes. They seem to have become obsolete and been forgotten by the Third Age, and this is supported by the fact that only Elrond could still read the inscriptions on the swords.

Tolkien devised this runic alphabet in a very early stage of his shaping of Middle-earth. Nevertheless, they are known to us from a slip of paper that Tolkien wrote; his son Christopher sent a photocopy of it to Paul Nolan Hyde in February 1992. Hyde published it, with an extensive analysis, in the 1992 Summer issue of Mythlore, no. 69. He commented that although J. R. R. Tolkien had said the "oldest cirth" were "unsystematic", they did not appear so. For example, all the vowels have both short and long forms: vowels are marked as long by adding a stroke, or by doubling the character. The system was reanalyzed by Carl F. Hostetter, who corrected the reading of the χ̑ rune to an ich-laut (voiceless palatal fricative). Later, in Parma Eldalamberon 15, the original manuscript including a script variety of Gondolinic, the first cursive form of any of Tolkien's runic scripts, was presented.

The system provides sounds not found in any of the known Elvish languages of the First Age, but perhaps it was designed for a variety of languages. However, the consonants seem to be, more or less, the same found in Welsh phonology, a theory supported by the fact that Tolkien was heavily influenced by Welsh when creating Elvish languages.

Consonants
		Labial		Dentals						Palatal		Dorsal		Glottal	
		Rune	IPA	Rune	IPA	Rune	IPA	Rune	IPA	Rune	IPA	Rune	IPA	Rune	IPA
Plosive	Voiceless	p	/p/			t	/t/					k (c)	/k/		
Plosive	Voiced	b	/b/			d	/d/					g	/ɡ/		
Fricative	Voiceless	f	/f/	þ	/θ/	s	/s/	š	/ʃ/			χ	/x/	h	/h/
Fricative	Voiced	v	/v/	ð	/ð/	z	/z/	ž	/ʒ/						
Affricate	Voiceless							tš (ch)	/t͡ʃ/						
Affricate	Voiced							dž (j)	/d͡ʒ/						
Nasal	Voiced	m	/m/			n	/n/					ŋ	/ŋ/		
Nasal	Voiceless	(mh)	/m̥/									(ŋh)	/ŋ̊/		
Trill	Voiced					r	/r/								
Trill	Voiceless					rh	/r̥/								
Lateral	Approximant					l	/l/								
Lateral	Fricative					lh	/ɬ/								
Approximant	Voiced									j (i̯)	/j/	w (u̯)	/w/		
Approximant	Voiceless									χ̑	/ç/^{?}	ƕ	/ʍ/		

Vowels
Rune	IPA	Rune	IPA	Rune	IPA	Rune	IPA	Rune	IPA
a	/a/	e	/ɛ/	i	/i/	o	/ɔ/	u	/u/
ā	/aː/	ē	/eː/	ī	/iː/	ō	/oː/	ū	/uː/
æ	/æ/					œ	/œ/	y	/y/
ǣ	/æː/					œ̄	/œː/	ȳ	/yː/

== Encoding schemes ==
=== Unicode ===
Equivalents for some (but not all) cirth can be found in the Runic block of Unicode.

Tolkien's mode of writing Modern English in Anglo-Saxon runes received explicit recognition with the introduction of his three additional runes to the Runic block with the release of Unicode 7.0, in June 2014. The three characters represent the English ⟨k⟩, ⟨oo⟩ and ⟨sh⟩ graphemes, as follows:

- U+16F1 ᛱ RUNIC LETTER K
- U+16F2 ᛲ RUNIC LETTER SH
- U+16F3 ᛳ RUNIC LETTER OO

A proposal to encode Cirth in Unicode was made in 1997 but not approved.

=== ConScript Unicode Registry ===
Cirth (in Private Use Area)
- Range: U+E080..U+E0FF (128 code points)
- Plane: BMP
- Scripts: Artificial Scripts
- Major alphabets: Cirth
- Assigned: 0 code points
- Unused: 128 reserved code points
- Source standards: CSUR
- Note: Part of Private Use Area; possible conflicting fonts

A layout for Cirth in the Unicode Private Use Area was never standardized by ConScript Unicode Registry (CSUR) or the Under-ConScript Unicode Registry (UCSUR).

Two different encoding orders have been proposed:

- A 1997 CSUR proposal implemented by fonts like GNU Unifont and Code2000.
- A 2000 Unicode discussion paper applied to the CSUR block by fonts like Constructium and Fairfax.

The two encoding orders are the same for most of their range. The later part was re-ordered due to the insertion of two additional characters in the 2000 draft: A double-barred  was added at ..4E, with subsequent characters shifted one code point, and a W-shaped glyph was inserted at ..58, with subsequent characters shifted a second code point. In addition,  and  swap positions. The punctuation also differs slightly, with the vertical double bar replaced by a horizontal one. The three diacritical marks at the end of the range are omitted, for one fewer code point in the 2000 ordering.

Without proper rendering support, you may see question marks, boxes, or other symbols below instead of Cirth.

Cirth (1997 CSUR proposal)^{[1]} ConScript Unicode Registry 1997 code chart
	0	1	2	3	4	5	6	7	8	9	A	B	C	D	E	F
U+E08x																
U+E09x																
U+E0Ax																
U+E0Bx																
U+E0Cx																
U+E0Dx																
U+E0Ex																
U+E0Fx																
Notes 1.Grey areas indicate non-assigned code points

Cirth (2000 Unicode concept applied to the CSUR block)^{[1]} Unicode 2000 discussion paper
	0	1	2	3	4	5	6	7	8	9	A	B	C	D	E	F
xx0x																
xx1x																
xx2x																
xx3x																
xx4x																
xx5x																
xx6x																
xx7x																
Notes 1.Grey areas indicate non-assigned code points

== See also ==
- List of runestones
