= Affection (linguistics) =

Vowel sound change in Celtic languages

Affection (also known as vowel affection, infection or vowel mutation), in the linguistics of the Celtic languages, is the change in the quality of a vowel under the influence of the vowel of the following final syllable. It is a type of assimilation, or, more specifically, anticipatory (or regressive) assimilation at a distance.

The two main types of affection are a-affection and i-affection. There is also u-affection, which is more usually referred to as u-infection. The second type, i-affection, is an example of i-mutation and may be compared to the Germanic umlaut, and a-affection is similar to Germanic a-mutation. More rarely, the term "affection", like "umlaut", may be applied to other languages and is then a synonym for i-mutation more generally.

The vowel triggering the change was often later lost; for example, the plural of Welsh bardd "bard, poet" is beirdd, from *bardī with i-affection. Compare this to the similar umlaut process in English man and men. In other cases, the grammatical suffix that causes i-affection remains, such as in the Welsh cleifion, plural of claf "patient (n.)". See Middle Welsh for more examples.

== See also ==
- Apocope
- Metaphony
