= Metaphony =

Class of vowel change

In historical linguistics, metaphony is a class of sound change in which one vowel in a word is influenced by another in a process of assimilation. The sound change is normally "long-distance" in that the vowel triggering the change may be separated from the affected vowel by several consonants, or sometimes even by several syllables.

For more discussion, see the article on vowel harmony.

There are two types:

- Progressive (or left-to-right) metaphony, in which a vowel towards the beginning of a word influences a subsequent vowel.
- Regressive (or right-to-left) metaphony, in which a vowel towards the end of the word influences a preceding vowel.

Metaphony is closely related to some other linguistic concepts:

- Vowel harmony is sometimes used synonymously with metaphony. Usually, however, "vowel harmony" refers specifically to a synchronic process operating in a particular language, normally requiring all vowels in a word to agree in a particular feature (e.g. vowel height or vowel backness). Most commonly, the triggering vowel is in the first syllable of the word (i.e., this is a type of progressive metaphony), as in Turkish, Finnish and Hungarian. In some cases, however, the triggering vowel is in the last syllable, typically a suffix, as in many varieties of Andalusian Spanish.
- Umlaut refers to regressive metaphony, usually specifically of a diachronic type operating in the history of a language. The term "umlaut" is found especially in the Germanic languages (see Germanic umlaut). In some other languages, other terms are used instead for the same process (e.g. affection in Old Irish, simply metaphony in the Romance languages).

== See also ==
- Metaphony (Romance languages)
- Apophony
- Metathesis
- Vowel harmony
- Umlaut
