= Metaphony (Romance languages) =

Vowel mutation process in Romance languages

In the Romance languages, metaphony was an early vowel mutation process that operated in all Romance languages to varying degrees, raising (or sometimes diphthongizing) certain stressed vowels in words with a final /i/ or /u/ or a directly following /j/. This is conceptually similar to the umlaut process characteristic of the Germanic languages. Metaphony is most extensive in the Italo-Romance languages, and applies to nearly all languages of Italy. However, it is absent from Tuscan, and hence from Standard Italian.

== Italo-Romance languages ==
Raising-type metaphony in Servigliano, in the Marches of Italy
Unaffected	Mutated
/ˈmetto/ "I put"	/ˈmitti/ "you put"
/ˈkwesto/ "this (neut.)"	/ˈkwistu/ "this (masc.)"
/moˈdɛsta/ "modest (fem.)"	/moˈdestu/ "modest (masc.)"
/ˈprɛdoko/ "I preach"	/ˈprediki/ "you preach"
/ˈfjore/ "flower"	/ˈfjuri/ "flowers"
/ˈsposa/ "wife"	/ˈspusu/ "husband"
/ˈmɔre/ "he dies"	/ˈmori/ "you die"
/ˈmɔʃa/ "depressed (fem.)"	/ˈmoʃu/ "depressed (masc.)"

Diphthongization-type metaphony in Calvello, in the Basilicata region of southern Italy
Unaffected	Mutated
/ˈpɛre/ "foot"	/ˈpjeri/ "feet"
/ˈlɛddʒe/ "light (fem.)"	/ˈljeddʒi/ "light (masc.)"
/ˈpɛnʒo/ "I think"	/ˈpjenʒi/ "you think"
/ˈmese/ "month"	/ˈmisi/ "months"
/ˈmette/ "he puts"	/ˈmitti/ "you put"
/ˈvɔsko/ "woods"	/ˈvwoski/ "woods (pl.)"
/ˈɣrɔssa/ "big (fem.)"	/ˈɣrwossu/ "big (masc.)"
/ˈmɔvo/ "I move"	/ˈmwovi/ "you move"
/kaˈvrone/ "coal"	/kaˈvruni/ "coals"
/ˈsola/ "alone (fem.)"	/ˈsulu/ "alone (masc.)"
/ˈkorre/ "he runs"	/ˈkurri/ "you run"

Metaphony in central and southern Italo-Romance (i.e. excluding Tuscan) affects stressed mid-vowels if the following syllable contains /i/ or /u/. As a general rule, the high-mids /e o/ are raised to /i u/, and the low-mids /ɛ ɔ/ are raised to /e o/ or diphthongized to /je wo/. Metaphony is not triggered by final /o/. The main occurrences of final /i/ are as follows:

- The plural of nouns in -o (< nominative plural -ī).
- The plural of nouns in -e (either a regular development of alternative third-declension accusative plural -īs, or analogical to plural -ī).
- The second-person singular present tense (a regular development of -īs in verbs in -īre and analogical in verbs in -ere, -ēre, -āre; in Old Italian, the ending -e is still found in -are verbs).
- The first-person singular past indicative (< -ī).

The main occurrences of final /o/ are as follows:

- The first-person singular present indicative (< -ō).
- Masculine "mass" nouns, and "neuter" (mass-noun) demonstratives (disputed origin).

The main occurrence of final /u/ is in masculine "count" nouns (< -um).

Metaphony in the northern Italian languages (those to the north of Tuscany) is triggered only by final /i/. In these languages, as in Tuscan, final /u/ was lowered to /o/; it evidently happened prior to the action of metaphony. In these languages, metaphony also tends to apply to final /a/, raising it to /ɛ/ or /e/.

In most Italian languages, most final vowels have become obscured (in the south) or lost (in the north), and the effects of metaphony are often the only markers of masculine vs. feminine and singular vs. plural.

== Western Romance languages ==
In all of the Western Romance languages, metaphony was triggered by a final /i/ (especially of the first-person singular of the preterite), raising mid-high stressed vowels to high vowels. (It does not normally occur in the nominative plural noun forms in Old French and Old Occitan that have a reflex of nominative plural /i/, suggesting that these developments were removed early by analogy.) Examples:

- vīgintī "twenty" > *vigintī > PIR /veˈenti/ > Italian venti; but > pre-PWR /veˈinti/ > PWR /veˈinte/ > Old Spanish veínte (> modern veinte /bejnte/), Old Portuguese veínte (> viínte > modern vinte), Old French vint (> modern vingt /vɛ̃/).
- fēcī, fēcit "I did, he did" (preterite) > Italian feci, fece; but > pre-PWR /ˈfedzi, ˈfedzet/ > /ˈfidzi, ˈfedzet/ > PWR /ˈfidze, ˈfedzet/ > Old Spanish fize, fezo(> fize, fizo > modern hice, hizo), Portuguese fiz, fez, Old French fis, fist (< *fis, feist).

=== Astur-Leonese ===
In some of the Astur-Leonese dialects, in northern Spain, a distinction between mass and count nouns appeared at an early stage. Count nouns from Latin masculines preserved the -u (<um) from Latin accusative, while mass nouns from Latin masculines (traditionally called "mass-neuter") were marked by -o. In addition, Astur-Leonese marked masculine plurals with /os/ (< -ōs).

In this situation, only masculine singular count nouns developed metaphony, as they were the ones marked with a /-u/, and mass nouns and plurals, marked with /-o/, did not. This ending system has been preserved in only central Asturian dialects. Unlike metaphony, which is considered dialectal, it has also been included in the standard version of Asturian.

Raising-type metaphony in masculine central Asturian nouns. Northwestern Iberia
Mutated		Unaffected			
Masc. sing.		Mass		Masc. plural	
pilu	/ˈpilu/	pelo	/ˈpelo/	pelos	/ˈpelos/
quisu	/ˈkisu/	queso	/ˈkeso/	quesos	/ˈkesos/
fiirru	/ˈfjiru/	fierro	/ˈfjero/	fierros	/ˈfjeros/

However, at later stages, Eastern Astur-Leonese dialects (Eastern Asturias and Cantabria) lost the u/o distinction in noun gender markers. Some of those dialects also lost metaphony and the noun count/mass distinction altogether, keeping it only in their pronoun systems, others, such as Pasiegu from Eastern Cantabria closed all their mid-vowels in word ending syllables, and relied on metaphony as a means for distinguishing mass/count nouns.

Raising-type metaphony in masculine Pasiegu nouns. Northwestern Iberia
Mutated		Unaffected			
Masc. sing.		Mass		Masc. plural	
pilu	/ˈpɨlʉ/	pelu	/ˈpelu/	pelus	/ˈpelus/
quisu	/ˈkɨsʉ/	quesu	/ˈkesu/	quesus	/ˈkesus/
fiirru	/ˈjɨrʉ/	fierru	/ˈjeru/	fierrus	/ˈjerus/

Some Astur-Leonese dialects also presented i-triggered metaphony. It is also considered dialectal, and it is most prevalent in imperatives (durmi < PIR dormi, sleep!), preterites (vini < PIE veni, I came) and demonstratives (isti < esti, this; isi < esi, that). Sometimes it prevents diphthongization (durmi vs duermi, sleep!; curri vs cuerri, run!) by closing the mid vowel in the verbal stem.

=== Portuguese ===
Raising of /ɔ, ɛ/ to /o, e/ by a following final /u/ occurs sporadically in Portuguese. Example: porcum, porcōs "pig, pigs" > Proto-Ibero-Romance /ˈpɔrku, ˈpɔrkos/ > Portuguese porco /ˈporku/ vs. porcos /ˈpɔrkus/; novum, novōs, novam, novās "new (masc., masc. pl., fem., fem. pl.)" > PIR /ˈnɔvu, ˈnɔvos, ˈnɔva, ˈnɔvas/ > Portuguese novo /ˈnovu/ vs. novos, nova, novas /ˈnɔvus, ˈnɔva, ˈnɔvas/. In this case, Old Portuguese apparently had /u/ in the singular vs. /os/ in the plural, despite the spelling ⟨-o -os⟩; a later development has raised plural /os/ to /us/. Furthermore, the mass/count distinction is expressed very differently: Only a few "mass neuter" demonstratives exist, and they have a higher rather than lower vowel (tudo "everything" vs. todo "all (masc.)", isto "this (neut.)" vs. este "this (masc.)"). In addition, the original pattern has been extended to some nouns originally in /o/.

Metephony on present tense and imperative verbs also occurs.

Metaphony in nouns
Affected		Unaffected	
Singular		Plural	
medo	/ˈmedu/	medos	/ˈmedus/ (Brazil) /ˈmeduʃ/ (Portugal)
fogo	/ˈfogu/	fogos	/ˈfɔgus/ (Brazil) /ˈfɔguʃ/ (Portugal)

Metaphony in adjectives
Affected		Unaffected					
Masc. sing.		Fem. sing.		Masc. plural		Fem. plural	
avesso	/aˈvesu/ (Brazil) /ɐˈvesu/ (Portugal)	avessa	/aˈvɛsɐ/ (Brazil) /ɐˈvɛsɐ/ (Portugal)	avessos	/aˈvɛsus/ (Brazil) /ɐˈvɛsuʃ/ (Portugal)	avessas	/aˈvɛsɐs/ (Brazil) /ɐˈvɛsɐʃ/ (Portugal)
novo	/ˈnovu/	nova	/ˈnɔvɐ/	novos	/ˈnɔvus/ (Brazil) /ˈnɔvuʃ/ (Portugal)	novas	/ˈnɔvɐs/ (Brazil) /ˈnɔvɐʃ/ (Portugal)
virtuoso	/viʁtuˈozu/ (Brazil) /viɾtuˈozu/ (Portugal)	virtuosa	/viʁtuˈɔzɐ/ (Brazil) /viɾtuˈɔzɐ/ (Portugal)	virtuosos	/viʁtuˈɔzus/ (Brazil) /viɾtuˈɔzuʃ/ (Portugal)	virtuosas	/viʁtuˈɔzɐs/ (Brazil) /viɾtuˈɔzɐʃ/ (Portugal)

Metaphony in the personal pronoun ele (he, him) and derivatives (she, her; they, them)
Unaffected		Affected					
Masc. sing.		Fem. sing.		Masc. plural		Fem. plural	
ele	/ˈeli/ (Brazil) /ˈelɨ/ (Portugal)	ela	/ˈɛlɐ/	eles	/ˈelis/ (Brazil) /ˈelɨʃ/ (Portugal)	elas	/ˈɛlɐs/ (Brazil) /ˈɛlɐʃ/ (Portugal)

Metaphony in demonstrative pronouns (except by tudo and derivatives)
Unaffected (closed vowel)		Affected (close-mid vowel)		Affected (open-mid vowel)					
Neutral		Masc. sing.		Fem. sing.		Masc. plural		Fem. plural	
isto	/ˈistu/ (Brazil) /ˈiʃtu/ (Portugal)	este	/ˈestʃi/ (Brazil) /ˈeʃtɨ/ (Portugal)	esta	/ˈɛstɐ/ (Brazil) /ˈɛʃtɐ/ (Portugal)	estes	/ˈestʃis/ (Brazil) /ˈeʃtɨʃ/ (Portugal)	estas	/ˈɛstɐs/ (Brazil) /ˈɛʃtɐʃ/ (Portugal)
isso	/ˈisu/	esse	/ˈesi/ (Brazil) /ˈesɨ/ (Portugal)	essa	/ˈɛsɐ/	esses	/ˈesis/ (Brazil) /ˈesɨʃ/ (Portugal)	essas	/ˈɛsɐs/ (Brazil) /ˈɛsɐʃ/ (Portugal)
aquilo	/aˈkilu/ (Brazil) /ɐˈkilu/ (Portugal)	aquele	/aˈkeli/ (Brazil) /ɐˈkelɨ/ (Portugal)	aquela	/aˈkɛlɐ/ (Brazil) /ɐˈkɛlɐ/ (Portugal)	aqueles	/aˈkelis/ (Brazil) /ɐˈkelɨʃ/ (Portugal)	aquelas	/aˈkɛlɐs/ (Brazil) /ɐˈkɛlɐʃ/ (Portugal)

Metaphony in the demonstrative pronoun tudo (all, everything) and derivatives
Unaffected		Affected							
Neutral		Masc. sing.		Fem. sing.		Masc. plural		Fem. plural	
tudo	/ˈtudu/	todo	/ˈtodu/	toda	/ˈtodɐ/	todos	/ˈtodus/ (Brazil) /ˈtoduʃ/ (Portugal)	todas	/ˈtodɐs/ (Brazil) /ˈtodɐʃ/ (Portugal)

== Romanian ==
Romanian shows metaphony of the opposite sort, where final /a/ (and also /e/, especially in the case of /o/) caused a diphthongization /e/ > /ea/, /je/ > /ja/, /o/ > /oa/: cēram "wax" > ceară; equam "mare" > /*ɛpa/ > /*jepa/ > iapă; flōrem "flower" > floare; nostrum, nostrī, nostram, nostrās "our (masc. sg., masc. pl., fem. sg., fem. pl.)" > /*nostru, nostri, nostra, nostre/ > nostru, noștri, noastră, noastre.

== Sardinian ==
Sardinian likewise has a distinction between final /o/ and /u/ (again with plural /os/), along with metaphony. In the conservative Logudorese and Nuorese dialects, the result of metaphony is a non-phonemic alternation between [e o] (when final /i/ or /u/ occurs) and [ɛ ɔ] (with other final vowels). In Campidanese, final /e o/ have been raised to /i u/, with the result that the metaphonic alternations have been phonemicized.

== See also ==
- Romance languages
- Germanic umlaut
