= Recordings of the music for The Lord of the Rings film series =

Recordings of operatic film score cycle

The music of The Lord of the Rings film series, composed by Howard Shore to accompany Peter Jackson's films, exists in multiple recordings. It was heard by cinema audiences in the "theatrical" version, also released on DVD. Three single-disc albums were then released, forming briefer concert-pieces that broadly aligned with the narrative content of each film. Limited Deluxe CD versions contained additional bonus tracks. Extended versions of the films were released on DVD, with additional scenes and their accompanying music. A multi-disc set, The Complete Recordings, covered the entire score of the extended versions of the films on CD. A CD, The Rarities Archives, accompanied a 2010 book by Doug Adams. Finally, Shore edited The Lord of the Rings Symphony in six movements from the score, for concert performance.

== Soloists ==
For the three films Shore worked with many vocal and instrumental soloists.

Vocal

- Alto:
  - Hilary Summers (contralto)
  - Annie Lennox (light alto)
- Boy Soprano:
  - Benedict "Ben" Del Maestro
  - Edward Ross
  - Blake Heslop-Charman
- Mezzo-Soprano
  - Sheila Chandra
  - Janet Roddick
  - Enya
- Soprano
  - Elizabeth Fraser
  - Emilíana Torrini
  - Sissel Kyrkjebø
  - Isabel Bayrakdarian (lyrical soprano)
  - Miriam Stockley (lyrical)
  - Aivale Cole (née Mabel Faletolu; lyrical)
  - Renée Fleming (operatic soprano)

Cast Performers

- Billy Boyd (Pippin) – tenor
- Viggo Mortensen (Aragorn) – baritone
- Miranda Otto (Éowyn) – mezzo-soprano
- Sir Ian Holm (Bilbo Baggins) – baritone
- Sir Ian McKellen (Gandalf) – baritone
- Liv Tyler (Arwen) – soprano
- Dominic Monaghan (Meriadoc "Merry" Brandybuck) – tenor
- Elijah Wood (Frodo) – tenor
- Andy Serkis (Smeagol) – baritone
- Sir Peter Jackson provided a tamtam hit when Aragorn enters Edoras
- Other actors like John Rhys-Davies (as Treebeard), Alan Howard (voice of the ring), Bernard Hill (Theoden) and Orlando Bloom (Legolas) recited verses or provided narration, without a melody.

Instrumental

- The "Elvish Impersonators": Jannet Roddick, David Donaldson, Stephen Roche ("Plan 9") and David Long: Fiddlek, Hurdy-Gurdy, Rommelpot, Jaw Harp, Harmonium, Whistle, Bodhran, Goblet Drum, Castanets, Tambourines, drones, Zither; possibly Dan Bau, Hasapi, Conga and Bongos
- Dermot Crehan – Fiddle, Sarangi, Hardanger fiddle, Double Fiddle
- Sir James Galway – flute, tin whistle, low whistle (Note: For Sir James, Shore wrote a suite that acts like a concerto for flute and orchestra, based on the Shire and Fellowship themes.)
- Ulrich Herkenhoff – pan flute
- Edward Cervenka – Hammered Dulcimer, cimbalom
- Mike Taylor: Tin Whistle, Low Whistle, Fiddle
- Jan Hendrickse: Rhaita, Nay Flute
- Sylvia Hallett: Sarangi, Dilruba
- Edward Hession: Musette
- Tracey Goldsmith: Musette
- Jean Kelly: Celtic Harp
- Greg Knowles: Dulcimer, Cimbalom
- John Parricelli: Six-String Guitar, Twelve-String Guitar
- Gillian Tingay: Celtic Harp
- Sonia Slany: Monochord
- Robert White: Drones/Bodhrán
- Alan Doherty: Nay Flute, Tin Whistle
- Alan Kelly: Bodhrán

== Original soundtracks ==
Recordings of the score were originally issued on single-disc albums, that closely followed the theatrical release dates of the films or presented earlier versions recorded during the film's editing. The music on the disc was arranged as a concert-piece while also keeping reasonably with the plot progression of the film. Many of the cues are edited to create concert suites of some of the themes, such as the Ringwraith theme (in "Black Rider"), the Durin theme (in "Journey in the Dark"), the Rohan theme (in "Riders of Rohan"), and the Gondor theme (in "The White Tree").

No.	The Fellowship of the Ring	The Two Towers	The Return of the King
1	"The Prophecy" (3:55)^{[1][2]}	"Foundations of Stone" (3:51)^{[2]}	"A Storm Is Coming" (2:52)
2	"Concerning Hobbits" (2:55)^{[1][2]}	"The Taming of Sméagol" (2:48)^{[2]}	"Hope and Memory" (1:45)^{[1]}
3	"The Shadow of the Past" (3:32)^{[1]}	"The Riders of Rohan" (4:05)^{[2]}	"Minas Tirith" (3:37)^{[2]}
4	"The Treason of Isengard" (4:00)^{[1]}	"The Passage of the Marshes" (2:46)^{[1]}	"The White Tree" (3:25)^{[1][2]}
5	"The Black Rider" (2:48)^{[1][2]}	"The Uruk-hai" (2:58)^{[3]}	"The Steward of Gondor" (3:53)
6	"At the Sign of the Prancing Pony" (3:14)^{[1]}	"The King of the Golden Hall" (3:49)^{[2]}	"Minas Morgul" (1:58)^{[2]}
7	"A Knife in the Dark" (3:34)^{[1]}	"The Black Gate Is Closed" (3:17)^{[3]}	"The Ride of the Rohirrim" (2:08)^{[2]}
8	Flight to the Ford" (4:14)^{[1]}	"Evenstar" (3:15)^{[2]}	"Twilight and Shadow" (3:30)^{[1][2]}
9	"Many Meetings" (3:05)^{[1]}	"The White Rider" (2:28)^{[1]}	"Cirith Ungol" (1:44)^{[1]}
10	"The Council of Elrond" (3:49)^{[1]} _{Feat. Aníron (Theme for Aragorn and Arwen) by Enya}	"Treebeard" (2:43)^{[2]}	"Andúril" (2:35)^{[1][2]}
11	"The Ring Goes South" (2:03)^{[1]}	"The Leave Taking" (3:41)^{[2]}	"Shelob's Lair" (4:07)^{[2]}
12	"A Journey in the Dark" (4:20)^{[2]}	"Helm's Deep" (3:53)^{[1][2]}	"Ash and Smoke" (3:25)
13	"The Bridge of Khazad-dûm" (5:57)^{[1]}	"The Forbidden Pool" (5:27)^{[1][2]}	"The Fields of the Pelennor" (3:26)
14	"Lothlórien" (4:33)^{[1][2]}	"Breath of Life" (5:07)^{[2]}	"Hope Fails" (2:20)^{[1]}
15	"The Great River" (2:42)^{[1]}	"The Hornburg" (4:34)	"The Black Gate Opens" (4:01)^{[1]}
16	"Amon Hen" (5:02)	"Forth Eorlingas" (3:15)^{[1]}	"The End of All Things" (5:12)^{[1][2]}
17	"The Breaking of the Fellowship" (7:20)^{[2]}	"Isengard Unleashed" (5:01)	"The Return of the King" (10:14)
18	"May It Be" (by Enya; 4:19)^{[1][2]}	"Samwise the Brave" (3:46)^{[2]}	"The Grey Havens" (5:59)^{[2]}
19		"Gollum's Song" (5:51)^{[2]}	"Into the West" (5:57)^{[1][2]}
Bonus track		"Farewell to Lórien" (4:37)^{[2]}	"Use Well the Days" (3:10)^{[1][2]}
Total length	71:26	77:38	75:15
Total length	224:19		
^{[1]} Contains material not included in the Complete Recordings.^{[2]} Concertized piece^{[3]} Edited-down in the Deluxe Edition to accommodate for the Bonus track.

All soundtrack albums of the trilogy have been released through Reprise Records, Enya's label at that time of the first soundtrack's release. While the cover art for The Fellowship of the Ring uses an original compilation of film characters, the covers for The Two Towers and The Return of the King reflect the respective film posters.

Limited Deluxe versions of the Original Soundtracks were also released, with bonus tracks covering "Farewell to Lorien" (from the Extended Edition) and the song "Use Well the Days", as well as a documentary (made by Shore's wife, Elizabeth Conotoir) following Shore's creation of the music and his work with the soloists and director.

List of original soundtracks, with selected chart positions and certifications
Title	Album details	Peak chart positions										Certifications
Title	Album details	US	US Soundtracks	AUS	AUT	FIN	GER	NLD	NZL	SWI	UK	Certifications
The Fellowship of the Ring	Released: 20 November 2001; Label: Reprise; Formats: CD, digital download	29	2	8	2	2	3	7	21	8	10	RIAA: Platinum; BEA: Gold; BPI: Gold; IFPI FIN: Gold; IFPI SWI: Gold; MC: Gold
The Two Towers	Released: 10 December 2002; Label: Reprise; Formats: CD, digital download	43	2	31	11	3	8	20	—	14	28	RIAA: Gold; BPI: Gold; MC: Gold
The Return of the King	Released: 25 November 2003; Label: Reprise; Formats: CD, digital download	36	2	33	5	5	10	19	9	8	34	RIAA: Gold; BPI: Gold
"—" denotes a recording that did not chart or was not released in that territory.

== The Complete Recordings ==
Starting in 2005, a year after the extended release of The Return of the King, Reprise Records began to release one multi-disc set for each part of the trilogy. These annually published collections, titled The Complete Recordings, contain the entire score for the extended versions of the films on CD, along with an additional DVD-Audio disc that offers 2.0 stereo and 5.1 surround mixes of the soundtrack. Each album also comes with extensive liner notes by music journalist Doug Adams which reviews all of the tracks and provides information about the process of composing and recording the score, as well as a detailed list of all musical instruments, people and organizations involved. These Annotated Scores have been made freely available by New Line on the promotional website for the soundtracks (see below). The cover artwork uses common elements for the three albums like the film series' logo and an inscription in Tolkien's tengwar letters. The background of each album cover differs though in that it shows an aspect from the map of Middle-earth drawn by Christopher Tolkien that fits the title of the release and the location of the plot: The Fellowship of the Ring depicts the Shire, Rhudaur and Eregion in dark red, the cover for The Two Towers shows Rohan and Fangorn in dark blue while The Return of the King shows a map of Gondor in dark green.

In 2018, Rhino Entertainment re-released the Complete Recordings. The original CD box sets were re-released, with Blu-ray Audio discs replacing the DVD-Audio discs. The scores were also released on vinyl in limited edition, individually numbered sets. Additionally, the scores for The Fellowship of the Ring and The Two Towers were made available on digital download and streaming platforms for the first time.

=== The Fellowship of the Ring ===
The Lord of the Rings: The Fellowship of the Ring: The Complete Recordings

Soundtrack album by Howard Shore
- Released: 13 December 2005; 6 April 2018 (re-release)
- Studio: CTS Colosseum in Watford, England; Air Lyndhurst Studios in London, England; Abbey Road Studios in London, England; Wellington Town Hall in Wellington, New Zealand
- Length: 180:35
- Label: Reprise

The Complete Recordings for The Fellowship of the Ring which unlike the other two albums, was conceived as an isolated film score, span just over three hours of music on three CDs. The set was released on 13 December 2005. It was re-released on CD/Blu-ray audio, vinyl, and digital platforms on 6 April 2018.

Track listing

Disc one
No.	Title	Length
1.	"Prologue: One Ring to Rule Them All"	7:16
2.	"The Shire"	2:29
3.	"Bag End" (feat. "The Road Goes Ever On", performed by Ian McKellen)	4:35
4.	"Very Old Friends"	3:12
5.	"Flaming Red Hair"	2:39
6.	"Farewell Dear Bilbo"	1:45
7.	"Keep It Secret, Keep It Safe" (feat. "The Road Goes Ever On", performed by Ian Holm and "Drinking Song" performed by Billy Boyd and Dominic Monaghan)	8:54
8.	"A Conspiracy Unmasked"	6:09
9.	"Three Is Company"	1:58
10.	"The Passing of the Elves"	2:39
11.	"Saruman the White"	4:09
12.	"A Shortcut to Mushrooms"	4:07
13.	"Strider"	2:34
14.	"The Nazgûl" (feat. "The Song of Beren and Lúthien", performed by Viggo Mortensen)	6:04
Total length:		58:30

Disc two
No.	Title	Length
1.	"Weathertop"	2:14
2.	"The Caverns of Isengard"	4:54
3.	"Give Up the Halfling"	4:49
4.	"Orthanc"	1:06
5.	"Rivendell"	3:26
6.	"The Sword That Was Broken"	3:34
7.	"The Council of Elrond Assembles" (feat. "Aníron (Theme for Aragorn and Arwen)", composed & performed by Enya)	4:01
8.	"The Great Eye"	5:30
9.	"Gilraen's Memorial"	5:01
10.	"The Pass of Caradhras"	5:04
11.	"The Doors of Durin"	6:03
12.	"Moria"	2:27
13.	"Gollum"	2:26
14.	"Balin's Tomb"	8:30
Total length:		59:05

Disc three
No.	Title	Length
1.	"Khazad-dûm"	8:00
2.	"Caras Galadhon" (feat. "Lament for Gandalf", performed by Elizabeth Fraser)	9:20
3.	"The Mirror of Galadriel"	6:21
4.	"The Fighting Uruk-hai"	11:32
5.	"Parth Galen"	9:13
6.	"The Departure of Boromir"	5:29
7.	"The Road Goes Ever On... (Part 1)"	5:58
8.	"May It Be" (composed & performed by Enya)	3:26
9.	"The Road Goes Ever On... (Part 2)" (feat. "In Dreams", performed by Edward Ross)	3:41
Total length:		63:01

=== The Two Towers ===
The Lord of the Rings: The Two Towers: The Complete Recordings

Soundtrack album by Howard Shore
- Released: 7 November 2006; 27 July 2018 (re-release)
- Studio: CTS Colosseum in Watford, England; Abbey Road Studios in London, England; Air Lyndhurst Studios in London, England; Henry Wood Hall in London, England
- Length: 188:13
- Label: Reprise

The Complete Recordings for The Two Towers span over three hours of music on three CDs. The set was released on 7 November 2006. It was re-released on CD/Blu-ray audio, vinyl, and digital platforms on 27 July 2018.

Professional ratings
Review scores
Source	Rating
AllMusic	4/5 stars
ScoreNotes	A

Track listing

Disc one
No.	Title	Length
1.	"Glamdring"	3:50
2.	"Elven Rope"	2:19
3.	"Lost in Emyn Muil"	4:15
4.	"My Precious"	2:56
5.	"Uglúk's Warriors"	1:41
6.	"The Three Hunters"	6:12
7.	"The Banishment of Éomer"	3:55
8.	"Night Camp"	2:50
9.	"The Plains of Rohan"	4:15
10.	"Fangorn"	5:13
11.	"The Dead Marshes"	5:08
12.	"Wraiths on Wings"	2:08
13.	"Gandalf the White"	6:48
14.	"The Dreams of Trees"	1:55
15.	"The Heir of Númenor"	6:51
16.	"Ent-Draught"	2:54
Total length:		63:10

Disc two
No.	Title	Length
1.	"Edoras"	4:34
2.	"The Court of Meduseld"	3:11
3.	"Théoden King" (feat. "The Funeral of Théodred", performed by Miranda Otto)	6:12
4.	"The King's Decision"	2:08
5.	"Exodus from Edoras"	5:43
6.	"The Forests of Ithilien"	6:38
7.	"One of the Dúnedain" (feat. "Evenstar", performed by Isabel Bayrakdarian)	7:13
8.	"The Wolves of Isengard"	4:22
9.	"Refuge at Helm's Deep"	4:00
10.	"The Voice of Saruman"	1:12
11.	"Arwen's Fate" (feat. "The Grace of the Valar", performed by Sheila Chandra)	3:59
12.	"The Story Foretold"	3:39
13.	"Sons of the Steward"	6:03
14.	"Rock and Pool"	2:55
15.	"Faramir's Good Council"	2:21
Total length:		63:59

Disc three
No.	Title	Length
1.	"Aragorn's Return"	2:12
2.	"War Is Upon Us"	3:36
3.	"Where Is the Horse and the Rider?"	6:16
4.	"The Host of the Eldar"	2:51
5.	"The Battle of the Hornburg"	2:53
6.	"The Breach of the Deeping Wall"	3:03
7.	"The Entmoot Decides"	2:06
8.	"Retreat" (feat. "Haldir's Lament", performed by Elizabeth Fraser)	4:41
9.	"Master Peregrin's Plan"	2:32
10.	"The Last March of the Ents" (feat. Ben Del Maestro)	2:31
11.	"The Nazgûl Attack"	2:45
12.	"Théoden Rides Forth" (feat. Ben Del Maestro)	5:48
13.	"The Tales That Really Matter"	12:01
14.	"Long Ways to Go Yet" (feat. "Gollum's Song", performed by Emilíana Torrini)	8:06
Total length:		61:12

=== The Return of the King ===
The Lord of the Rings: The Return of the King: The Complete Recordings

Soundtrack album by Howard Shore
- Released: 20 November 2007; 21 September 2018 (re-release)
- Studio: CTS Colosseum in Watford, England; Abbey Road Studios in London, England; Air Lyndhurst Studios in London, England
- Length: 229:17
- Label: Reprise

The Complete Recordings for The Return of the King span almost 3 hours and 50 minutes on four CDs. The accompanying DVD-audio disc is double-sided to accommodate all of the material. The set was released on 20 November 2007 on CD/DVD-Audio and digital download. It was re-released on CD/Blu-ray audio and vinyl on 21 September 2018.

Track listing

Disc one
No.	Title	Length
1.	"Roots and Beginnings"	6:31
2.	"Journey to the Crossroads"	2:17
3.	"The Road to Isengard"	2:18
4.	"The Foot of Orthanc"	4:45
5.	"Return to Edoras"	1:51
6.	"The Chalice Passed"	1:51
7.	"The Green Dragon" (feat. Billy Boyd and Dominic Monaghan)	0:35
8.	"Gollum's Villainy"	2:10
9.	"Éowyn's Dream"	1:24
10.	"The Palantír"	3:10
11.	"Flight from Edoras"	2:19
12.	"The Grace of Undómiel" (feat. Renée Fleming)	6:21
13.	"The Eyes of the White Tower"	4:33
14.	"A Coronal of Silver and Gold"	8:27
15.	"The Lighting of the Beacons"	9:03
Total length:		57:32

Disc two
No.	Title	Length
1.	"Osgiliath Invaded" (feat. Ben Del Maestro)	8:48
2.	"The Stairs of Cirith Ungol"	2:41
3.	"Allegiance to Denethor"	3:20
4.	"The Sacrifice of Faramir" (feat. "The Edge of Night", performed by Billy Boyd)	4:09
5.	"The Parting of Sam and Frodo"	4:04
6.	"Marshalling at Dunharrow"	4:57
7.	"Andúril – Flame of the West"	3:28
8.	"The Passing of the Grey Company"	4:12
9.	"Dwimorberg – The Haunted Mountain"	2:26
10.	"Master Meriadoc, Swordthain"	1:40
11.	"The Paths of the Dead"	6:22
12.	"The Siege of Gondor"	9:01
13.	"Shelob's Lair"	8:53
14.	"Merry's Simple Courage"	2:09
Total length:		66:03

Disc three
No.	Title	Length
1.	"Grond – The Hammer of the Underworld"	1:33
2.	"Shelob the Great"	5:13
3.	"The Tomb of the Stewards"	3:58
4.	"The Battle of the Pelennor Fields"	4:10
5.	"The Pyre of Denethor"	2:59
6.	"The Mûmakil"	0:57
7.	"Dernhelm in Battle"	2:06
8.	"A Far Green Country"	1:28
9.	"Shieldmaiden of Rohan"	5:07
10.	"The Passing of Théoden"	2:16
11.	"The Houses of Healing" (feat. Liv Tyler)	2:58
12.	"The Tower of Cirith Ungol"	4:41
13.	"The Last Debate" (feat. "Asëa Aranion", performed by Sissel)	4:21
14.	"The Land of Shadow"	6:29
15.	"The Mouth of Sauron" (feat. Sir James Galway)	8:16
16.	"For Frodo" (feat. Ben Del Maestro)	3:17
Total length:		59:44

Disc four
No.	Title	Length
1.	"Mount Doom" (feat. Renée Fleming)	4:09
2.	"The Crack of Doom"	4:02
3.	"The Eagles" (feat. Renée Fleming)	2:24
4.	"The Fellowship Reunited" (feat. Sir James Galway, Viggo Mortensen, and Renée Fleming)	12:18
5.	"The Journey to the Grey Havens" (feat. Sir James Galway)	7:35
6.	"Elanor" (feat. Sir James Galway)	1:28
7.	"Days of the Ring" (feat. "Into the West", performed by Annie Lennox)	11:10
8.	"Bilbo's Song"	2:58
Total length:		45:58

== The Music of the Lord of the Rings Films ==
The Music of the Lord of the Rings Films is a 2010 book by Doug Adams. The book contains a detailed look at the themes and leitmotives in the film's music, along with snippets of sheet music and illustrations, and a companion CD, The Rarities Archives.

=== The Rarities Archives ===
The Lord of the Rings: The Rarities Archives

Soundtrack album by Howard Shore
- Released: European Union on 28 September and in the US and worldwide on 5 October 2010
- Length: 1:19:25
- Label: Howe Records

Track listing
No.	Title	Length
1.	"Prologue: One Ring to Rule Them All (Alternate)"	5:56
2.	"The Shire/The Hobbits (Mock-up)"	2:00
3.	"Out From Bree (Theatrical Version & Alternate)"	4:04
4.	"Flight to the Ford (Alternate)"	4:04
5.	"Moria (Mock-up)"	1:44
6.	"The Fighting Uruk-hai (Alternate)"	1:47
7.	"The Argonath (Alternate)"	2:18
8.	"Gwenwin in în ("Arwen's Song" Alternate/Mock-up)"	2:02
9.	"Arwen's Song (Complete)"	2:11
10.	"Emyn Muil (Alternate)"	3:23
11.	"The Rohan Fanfare (Mock-up)"	3:09
12.	"The Eaves of Fangorn (Alternate)"	5:25
13.	"The Ent Theme (Mock-up)"	2:00
14.	"The Return of the King Trailer"	2:34
15.	"The Gondor Theme (Mock-up)"	2:18
16.	"The Muster of Rohan (Alternate)"	6:43
17.	"The Siege of Gondor (Alternate)"	3:13
18.	"Shieldmaiden of Rohan (Theatrical Version)"	2:00
19.	"Sammath Naur (Alternate)"	8:51
20.	"Frodo's Song ("Into the West" Alternate/Mock-up)"	2:23
21.	"Elanor (Alternate)"	1:30
22.	"In Conversation (Audio Interview Part 1), featuring "Roots and Beginnings" (alternate)"	5:05
23.	"In Conversation (Audio Interview Part 2), featuring "Frodo's Song" (alternate), played by Sir James Galway."	4:27

== Symphony ==
The Lord of the Rings Symphony

Soundtrack album by Howard Shore
- Released: 13 September 2011
- Recorded: Lucerne, Switzerland
- Length: 1:55:51
- Label: Howe Records

Howard Shore reworked the music from the films and original soundtrack releases into movements for the concert hall, eventually creating the complete The Lord of the Rings Symphony, a more structured six-movement work for orchestra, choir and soloist. The suite has been performed in various concert halls around the world, accompanied by a light and visual art show by Alan Lee and John Howe. A DVD titled Howard Shore: Creating the Lord of the Rings Symphony—a composer's journey through Middle Earth has been released. The 50-minute-long DVD features extensive excerpts of the concert given by Shore and the Montreal Orchestra, Grand Choir and Children choir at the "Montreal en Lumiere" Festival, interspersed with spoken commentary by Shore, who recounts his approach in composing the music for the three films and then reworking it into the LOTR symphony. On 13 September 2011, Shore released "The Lord of the Rings Symphony" on CD and MP3 format. The double-album was recorded in Lucerne, Switzerland and performed by the 21st Century Symphony Orchestra & Chorus (including treble Loris Sikora, Boy Soprano Manuelle Polli, Mezzo-Soprano Kaitlyn Lusk and Bass-Baritone Marc-Olivier Oetterli) under the direction of Ludwig Wicki.

=== Track listing ===
"Movement 1" – 11:25

1. The Prophecy
2. Concerning Hobbits
3. The Seduction of the Ring
4. The Black Rider and Treason of Isengard

"Movement 2" – 34:04

1. Rivendell
2. The Ring Goes South
3. A Journey in the Dark
4. The Bridge of Khazad Dum
5. Lothlorien
6. The Great River
7. Amon Hen
8. The Breaking of the Fellowship

"Movement 3" – 18:15

1. Foundations of Stone/Glamdring
2. Gollum
3. Rohan
4. The Black Gate Is Closed
5. Evenstar
6. The White Rider
7. Treebeard
8. The Forbidden Pool

"Movement 4" – 10:28

1. The Hornburg
2. Forth Eorlingas
3. The Last March of the Ents
4. Gollum's Song

"Movement 5" – 15:26

1. Flight from Edoras
2. Minas Tirith
3. The Lighting of the Beacons
4. The Steward of Gondor
5. Cirith Ungol
6. Anduril

"Movement 6" – 26:13

1. The Fields of the Pelennor
2. The Paths of the Dead
3. The End of All Things
4. The Return of the King
5. The Grey Havens
6. Into the West
