= They're Taking the Hobbits to Isengard =

2005 viral video

"They're Taking the Hobbits to Isengard" is a video that was published in 2005 by Dutch musician and photographer Erwin Beekveld (1969–2022). The two-minute video composed of multiple fragments from the film trilogy The Lord of the Rings became an internet meme, and has obtained a cult status mostly among fans of the trilogy.

The video edits dialogue from the first two films, most prominently the line "They're taking the hobbits to Isengard!" spoken by Legolas in The Two Towers and replayed many times in the video, into a comedy song using a remixed techno version of music from the films.

== Origin ==
External videos
- Reupload on Youtube
- They're Taking the Hobbits to Isengard |

The video first appeared as Flash-animation on the website Albino Blacksheep and was mostly distributed via YouTube afterwards. The different uploads of this video have been viewed millions of times.

The video is built out of scenes from The Lord of the Rings: The Fellowship of the Ring and The Lord of the Rings: The Two Towers. In the video, actor Orlando Bloom is seen playing the elf Legolas, who repeats the line "They're taking the hobbits to Isengard!" He is occasionally interrupted by Gollum (played by Andy Serkis) with the words "What did you say?" and "Stupid fat hobbit!" and also by Marton Csokas who plays Celeborn, who repeatedly inquires the whereabouts of Gandalf. In addition, Elijah Wood, Dominic Monaghan, Billy Boyd and Sean Astin are seen playing hobbits Frodo Baggins, Merry Brandybuck, Pippin Took and Samwise Gamgee, as well as Viggo Mortensen as Aragorn, John Rhys-Davies as Gimli, and Cate Blanchett as Galadriel.

The dialogue is rhythmically set to a techno version of music originally composed by Howard Shore for the movies' soundtracks, and contains among others the leitmotif of the song Concerning Hobbits. The song caught the attention of participants of a discussion forum sponsored by the Association of Literary Scholars and Critics, in which the dactylic quality of the song's prosody was discussed at length.

In the book Fan Fiction and Copyright: Outsider Works and Intellectual Property Protection, "They’re Taking the Hobbits to Isengard" is mentioned as an example for the amendment on the Digital Millennium Copyright Act, an American law concerning the author's copyright on digital media. The amendment from 2010 made it legal, under certain conditions, to use fragments from movies and television shows in personal videos. Musicologist Michael L. Klein (Professor at the Temple University of Philadelphia) mentions "They're Taking the Hobbits to Isengard" in his book Music and the Crises of the Modern Subject as an example of a meme and mash-up as the pinnacle of creativity in the postmodern age.

In 2013, after Orlando Bloom finished filming his final scenes on the set of The Hobbit: The Battle of the Five Armies, director Peter Jackson published a video in which Bloom, dressed up as Legolas, sings along with "They're Taking the Hobbits to Isengard."

In an interview for Rude Tube published on Erwin Beekveld's YouTube channel in 2013, Beekveld says people love or hate him for making the video, due to its catchy tune, and that it made him very happy to see Orlando Bloom sing along with his remix eight years later, which he states is the "ultimate recognition."

On 30 March 2022, Beekveld died of lung cancer at the age of 52.
