= In Dreams (Howard Shore song) =

2001 Howard Shore song

"In Dreams" is a song by Howard Shore, with lyrics by Fran Walsh, originally written for Peter Jackson's 2001 film The Lord of the Rings: The Fellowship of the Ring. In the film, it was sung by the boy soprano Edward Ross of the London Oratory School Schola.

The song makes use of all the variants of one of the musical themes or leitmotifs used in the music written for The Lord of the Rings film series, namely "The Shire", with its "pensive", "rural", and "hymn" settings. It was originally the main end-credits song, a direct continuation of the Breaking of the Fellowship piece, which features the Hymn variant as well. The musicologist Doug Adams comments that "Like all Shore's music for the hobbits, this song is designed to feel as if it could be both about the Shire and from it—as if it were some sweetly nostalgic song sung at the closing of the Green Dragon [Inn] each night."

Since then, it has been arranged for many occasions, including a full symphonic version by the Mormon Tabernacle Choir , and a version by Joseph McManners.

The last lines pay homage to There and Back Again, an alternate title for Lord of the Rings author J. R. R. Tolkien's earlier book The Hobbit.

== Appearances ==
It plays during the ending credits of The Fellowship of the Ring, following "May It Be".

It appears in the track "The Breaking of the Fellowship" on the 2001 The Lord of the Rings: The Fellowship of the Ring: Original Motion Picture Soundtrack and "The Road Goes Ever On... (Part 2)" on the 2005 Complete Recordings of The Lord of the Rings: The Fellowship of the Ring.
