= Concerning Hobbits =

Concert suite by Howard Shore

"Concerning Hobbits" is a piece by composer Howard Shore derived from The Lord of the Rings: The Fellowship of the Ring soundtrack. It is a concert suite of the music of the Hobbits, arranged from the music heard in the film during the early Shire scenes, and features the various themes and leitmotifs composed for the Shire and Hobbits; it is intended to evoke feelings of peace. It is also the title of one of the sections of the prologue to The Lord of the Rings by J. R. R. Tolkien. Excerpts of the piece can be heard during an extended scene in the 2012 film The Hobbit: An Unexpected Journey, where it was tracked intentionally. The piece has become synonymous with the Shire and Hobbiton themes.

== Orchestration ==
The piece uses a large symphony orchestra (originally, The London Philharmonic Orchestra), including an on-stage band consisting of various Celtic instruments including tin whistle and fiddle. Although both instruments have solos and carry the main melodies throughout the piece, it is equally noted for Shore's distinctive use of the bodhrán to create a heartbeat-like sound. Other accompaniment instruments include a celtic harp, hammered dulcimer, musette-type accordion, drones, classical guitars, mandolin, low whistle and recorders. Live performances may feature an accordion and/or a concertina.

== Themes ==
One of the chief tracks of the trilogy, it is one of the happiest tracks, with others invoking feelings of heroism or foreboding. It show-cases the Shire theme or Hobbits' theme, in its main, "pensive" orchestral setting: A stepwise melody played by strings, a solo fiddle or a tin whistle in the key of D major. The B-section of the theme is often played by strings tutti to a very expansive effect, arguably forming a separate theme altogether.

Also in the piece is a "rural" or "folk" setting or variation, labelled by the musicologist Doug Adams as a separate theme for Hobbiton, played by solo fiddle and various Celtic instruments in accompaniment. The chords of the third main shire theme, the "hymn" variant (which later serves mostly as Frodo's theme), also play briefly under the melody.

The melody is accompanied by several motifs:

- Hobbit Outline Figure: This simple figure, often heard in the cellos and double basses, is used as an expectation of things to come. It is heard quite a bit in the early Shire scenes, portraying the hobbits' playful sides.
- Hobbit Two Step Figure: This short figure appears frequently during the introduction of the Shire, and it often concludes with the End Cap figure.
- Hobbit Skip Beat: This ostinato figure is heard throughout the Shire material, usually as an accompaniment, but sometimes more prominently.
- Hobbit End Cap: A graceful rim-shot that plays to the good-humoured hobbit lifestyle.
- The Heartbeat of the Shire: played on Bodhrán.

Also in the piece (about a minute into the track) is a coda that closes a statement of the Hobbiton theme, which coincides with the putting up of Bilbo's "Happy Birthday" sign.

== The music ==
The piece begins with the Hobbit outline figure motif in the strings before moving into a light statement of the main Shire theme on a solo tin whistle as the outline figure continues to play in accompaniment. As the solo concludes, the outline sounds twice before moving into a solo fiddle performance of the Hobbiton theme, played over the two-step figure (transitioning into the skip-beat accompaniment and back repetitively) in pizzicato strings, dulcimer and guitars. As the fiddle pauses, a musette adds "short sustained chord drones" and continues under the fiddle as it rounds up the phrase. Strings tutti then perform a lush variation of the B-phrase of the main shire theme over the skip-beat accompaniment; the fiddle then returns with the Hobbiton theme over the two-step accompaniment, and concludes it with the "fiddle fanfare" that accompanies the "Happy Birthday" sign.

A slow variation of the Skip-beat plays in the strings over slow chords and the orchestra quiets down. Guitars return with the skip beat, the strings enter with the two-step figure over the guitar before a celesta joins the latter, the bodhran heartbeat pattern which underlines the whole sequence is very noticeable here. Now, the low whistle plays the B-phrase of the Hobbiton theme before strings tuti play the lush B-phrase of the Shire theme again, ending with the end-cap figure. The fiddle than returns with the Rural Hobbit theme (over the two-step motif in the guitars) and concludes with the end-cap leitmotif. The Hobbit two-step continues in strings, moves into the skip-beat before the orchestra quiets down and the tin whistle returns, book-ending the suite with the Shire theme.

== Alternate versions ==
The piece has alternates in the Complete Recording tracks "The Shire" and "Bag End" (in the Extended Edition recording), in the Fan-Credits of the Fellowship of the Ring (where the fiddler is allowed to improvise more around the Hobbiton theme) and in The Lord of the Rings Symphony, which features the whole suite.

== Reception ==
Rosie Pentreath, reviewing the piece on Classic FM, wrote that "The airy, syncopated passages evoke sprightly, nimble Hobbits, jumping up and down the rock steps in front of their Hobbit holes, and dancing around merrily at Bilbo Baggins' 111th birthday party."

== See also ==
- In Dreams
- May It Be
- Into the West
