= The Lord of the Rings: The Two Towers (soundtrack) =

2002 soundtrack album by Howard Shore

Soundtrack album by Howard Shore
- Released: 10 December 2002
- Genre: Soundtrack
- Length: 72:46; 77:09 (limited edition)
- Label: Reprise
- Producer: Howard Shore

The Lord of the Rings: The Two Towers: Original Motion Picture Soundtrack was released on 10 December 2002. The score was composed, orchestrated, and conducted by Howard Shore, and performed by the London Philharmonic Orchestra, the London Voices, and the London Oratory School Schola. The Two Towers comes in a regular and a limited edition, which was an exclusive to Target in the US. This latter release contains the additional track "Farewell to Lórien" from the extended edition to The Fellowship of the Ring.

== Reception ==
Professional ratings
Review scores
Source	Rating
AllMusic	4/5 stars
Filmtracks	5/5 stars
Movie Music UK	5/5 stars
Tracksounds	9/10 stars

The Two Towers won the Grammy Award for Best Score Soundtrack Album.

== Track listing ==
All music is composed by Howard Shore.

No.	Title	Length
1.	"Foundations of Stone"	3:51
2.	"The Taming of Sméagol"	2:48
3.	"The Riders of Rohan"	4:05
4.	"The Passage of the Marshes"	2:46
5.	"The Uruk-hai"	2:58
6.	"The King of the Golden Hall"	3:49
7.	"The Black Gate Is Closed"	3:17
8.	"Evenstar" (feat. Isabel Bayrakdarian)	3:15
9.	"The White Rider"	2:28
10.	"Treebeard"	2:43
11.	"The Leave Taking"	3:41
12.	"Helm's Deep"	3:53
13.	"The Forbidden Pool"	5:27
14.	"Breath of Life" (feat. Sheila Chandra)	5:07
15.	"The Hornburg"	4:36
16.	"Forth Eorlingas" (feat. Ben Del Maestro)	3:15
17.	"Isengard Unleashed" (feat. Elizabeth Fraser and Ben Del Maestro)	5:01
18.	"Samwise the Brave"	3:46
19.	"Gollum's Song" (performed by Emilíana Torrini, lyrics by Fran Walsh)	5:51
Total length:		72:46

Limited edition bonus track
No.	Title	Length
20.	"Farewell to Lórien" (feat. Hilary Summers)	4:37

== Charts and certifications ==
=== Charts ===
Chart (2002–03)	Peak position
Australian Albums (ARIA)	31
Austrian Albums (Ö3 Austria)	11
Belgian Albums (Ultratop Flanders)	33
Belgian Albums (Ultratop Wallonia)	19
Canadian Albums (Billboard)	29
Finnish Albums (Suomen virallinen lista)	3
French Albums (SNEP)	35
German Albums (Offizielle Top 100)	8
Hungarian Albums (Mahasz)	12
Irish Albums (IRMA)	47
Irish Classical Albums (IRMA)	1
Dutch Albums (Album Top 100)	20
Norwegian Albums (VG-lista)	18
Swedish Albums (Sverigetopplistan)	16
Swiss Albums (Schweizer Hitparade)	14
UK Albums (Official Charts)	28
US Billboard 200	43
US Soundtrack Albums (Billboard)	2

=== Certifications ===
Sales certifications for The Lord of the Rings: The Two Towers
Region	Certification	Certified units/sales
Australia (ARIA)	Gold	35,000^{^}
Canada (Music Canada)	Gold	50,000^{^}
France	—	126,900
Germany (BVMI)	Gold	150,000^{^}
United Kingdom (BPI)	Gold	100,000^{^}
United States (RIAA)	Gold	500,000^{^}
^{^} Shipments figures based on certification alone.

== Complete Recording and additional music ==
In 2006, Reprise Records released a multi-disc set for the film, titled The Complete Recordings. These contain the entire score for the extended versions of the film on CD, along with an additional DVD-Audio disc that offers 2.0 stereo and 5.1 surround mixes of the soundtrack. The album featured extensive liner notes by music journalist Doug Adams which reviews all of the tracks and provides information about the process of composing and recording the score, as well as a detailed list of all musical instruments, people and organizations involved. The cover artwork uses the film series' logo and an inscription in Tolkien's tengwar letters, over a background that depicts Rohan and Fangorn in dark blue.

Disc one
No.	Title	Length
1.	"Glamdring"	3:50
2.	"Elven Rope"	2:19
3.	"Lost in Emyn Muil"	4:15
4.	"My Precious"	2:56
5.	"Uglúk's Warriors"	1:41
6.	"The Three Hunters"	6:12
7.	"The Banishment of Éomer"	3:55
8.	"Night Camp"	2:50
9.	"The Plains of Rohan"	4:15
10.	"Fangorn"	5:13
11.	"The Dead Marshes"	5:08
12.	""Wraiths on Wings""	2:08
13.	"Gandalf the White"	6:48
14.	"The Dreams of Trees"	1:55
15.	"The Heir of Númenor"	6:51
16.	"Ent-draught"	2:54
Total length:		63:10

Disc two
No.	Title	Length
1.	"Edoras"	4:34
2.	"The Court of Meduseld"	3:11
3.	"Théoden King" (feat. "The Funeral of Théodred", performed by Miranda Otto)	6:12
4.	"The King's Decision"	2:08
5.	"Exodus from Edoras"	5:43
6.	"The Forests of Ithilien"	6:38
7.	"One of the Dúnedain" (feat. "Evenstar", performed by Isabel Bayrakdarian)	7:13
8.	"The Wolves of Isengard"	4:22
9.	"Refuge at Helm's Deep"	4:00
10.	"The Voice of Saruman"	1:12
11.	"Arwen's Fate" (feat. "The Grace of the Valar", performed by Sheila Chandra)	3:59
12.	"The Story Foretold"	3:39
13.	"Sons of the Steward"	6:03
14.	"Rock and Pool"	2:55
15.	"Faramir's Good Council"	2:21
Total length:		63:59

Disc three
No.	Title	Length
1.	"Aragorn's Return"	2:12
2.	"War Is Upon Us"	3:36
3.	""Where Is the Horse and the Rider?""	6:16
4.	"The Host of the Eldar"	2:51
5.	"The Battle of the Hornburg"	2:53
6.	"The Breach of the Deeping Wall"	3:03
7.	"The Entmoot Decides"	2:06
8.	"Retreat" (feat. "Haldir's Lament", performed by Elizabeth Fraser)	4:41
9.	"Master Peregrin's Plan"	2:32
10.	"The Last March of the Ents" (feat. Ben Del Maestro)	2:31
11.	"The Nazgûl Attack"	2:45
12.	"Théoden Rides Forth" (feat. Ben Del Maestro)	5:48
13.	"The Tales That Really Matter"	12:01
14.	""Long Ways to Go Yet"" (feat. "Gollum's Song", performed by Emilíana Torrini)	8:06
Total length:		61:12

=== Additional Music ===
Additional music for the film was featured in The Rarities Archive release, attached to Doug Adams' book on the three film scores:

Track listing
No.	Title	Length
1.	""Gwenwin in în ("Arwen's Song" Alternate/Mock-up)""	2:02
2.	""Arwen's Song (Complete)""	2:11
3.	""Emyn Muil (Alternate)""	3:23
4.	"Flight to the Ford (Alternate)"	4:04
5.	""The Rohan Fanfare (Mock-up)""	3:09
6.	""The Eaves of Fangorn (Alternate)""	5:25
7.	""The Ent Theme (Mock-up)""	2:00
Total length:		22:14

Along with about 4 minutes of alternate material from the original release, about 8 minutes of alternates in the fan credits, and some additional alternates, there are about 3:40 minute of finalized music from The Two Towers.
