= Music of The Lord of the Rings film series =

Operatic film score cycle

The Lord of the Rings
- Operatic film score cycle by Howard Shore
- Related: The Hobbit
- Text: J. R. R. Tolkien, Philippa Boyens, Fran Walsh, Howard Shore
- Language: English, Old English, fictional languages (Sindarin, Quenya, Khuzdul, Black Speech, Adunaic)
- Composed: 2000–2004
- Movements: 90 movements (in three parts) for the live-to-projection cycle
- Scoring: soprano; boy soprano; alto; tenor (Symphony); male choir (Fellowship of the Ring); mixed choir; boy choir; "Hobbit Band"; symphony orchestra

The music of The Lord of the Rings film series was composed, orchestrated, conducted and produced by Howard Shore between 2000 and 2004 to support Peter Jackson's film trilogy based on J. R. R. Tolkien's fantasy novel of the same name. It is notable in terms of length of the score, the size of the staged forces, the unusual instrumentation, the featured soloists, the multitude of musical styles and the number of recurring musical themes used.

Shore wrote many hours of music for the trilogy, effectively scoring the film for its entire length. Over 13 hours of the music (including various alternate takes) have been released across various formats. Shore intended the score to be operatic and to have "a sense of age". He made use of an immense ensemble including a large symphony orchestra (principally, the London Philharmonic Orchestra), multiple instrumental "bands", various choirs, and vocal and instrumental soloists, requiring an ensemble ranging from 230 to 400 musicians.

The series music became the most successful of Shore's career, earning three Oscars, two Golden Globes, and three Grammys, among other nominations. Some of his themes or leitmotifs (like the Shire theme) became individually popular. The music has attracted the interest of musicologists and Tolkien scholars. It is performed by choirs and orchestras around the world as symphony pieces, concert suites and live to-projection concerts. Shore invited the musicologist Doug Adams to observe the composition process and to document it in what became the 2010 book The Music of the Lord of the Rings Films. It identifies the many themes of the score, and describes how these are used in each of the scenes of the film trilogy.

The music for the film series was voted the best soundtrack of all time by a Classic FM listener poll for six years in a row.

== Context ==
The Lord of the Rings is a fantasy novel by the English philologist and author J. R. R. Tolkien. It was published in 1954–1955, and became one of the most popular books of the 20th century, with over 150 million copies sold. It has been translated into at least 58 languages.

The New Zealand film director Peter Jackson created a film series based on the book. The three films were shot simultaneously and released between 2001 and 2003, to popular acclaim. Together the three films grossed over $2.9 billion worldwide.

== Creation ==
=== Film scores ===
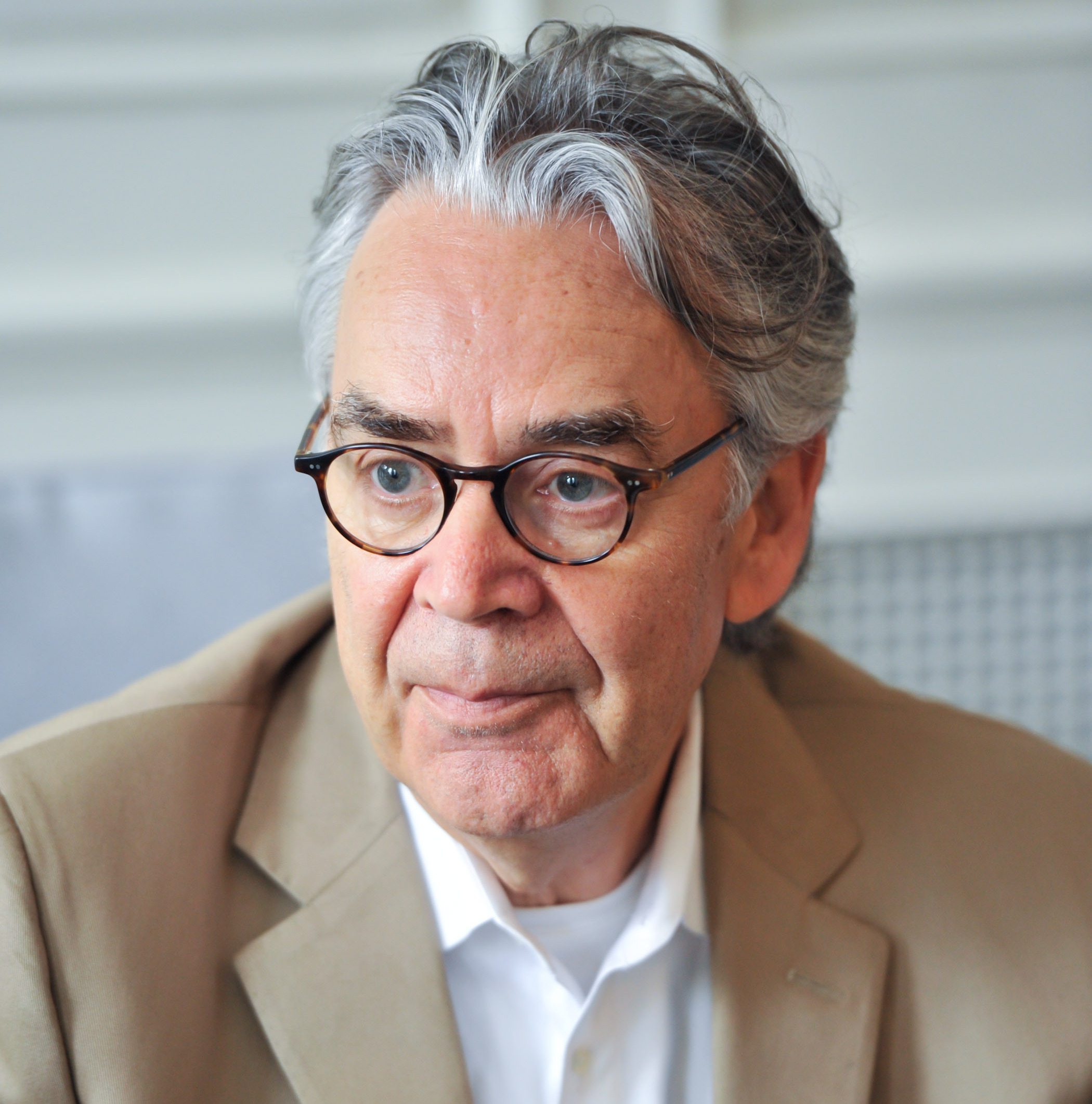
Howard Shore, composer of The Lord of the Rings film score

The Canadian composer and conductor Howard Shore composed, orchestrated, conducted and produced the film trilogy's music. The filmmakers had considered the American composer James Horner and the Polish composer Wojciech Kilar for the role. Shore visited the set in 1999, and composed a version of the Shire theme and Frodo's Theme before Jackson began shooting. In August 2000 he visited the set again, and watched the assembly cuts of The Fellowship of the Ring and The Return of the King. In the music, Shore included over 50 leitmotifs to represent the different characters, cultures and places. There are for instance multiple leitmotifs just for the hobbits and the Shire. Although part of the score for the first film was recorded in Wellington, New Zealand, virtually all of the trilogy's score was recorded in Watford Town Hall and mixed at Abbey Road Studios in London. Jackson planned to advise the score for six weeks each year in London, though for The Two Towers he stayed for twelve. Shore composed a main theme for the Fellowship (Note: Fellowship theme Archived 18 December 2022 at the Wayback Machine (listening sample)) rather than many different character themes, and the Fellowship's highs and lows are depicted during the series. Individual themes were composed to represent different cultures.

Shore orchestrated the score himself, to maintain clarity in the presentation of the music's themes. The central theme, shown here, is "The History of the Ring", (Note: History of the Ring Theme Archived 11 March 2007 at the Wayback Machine (listening sample)) first heard at the start of the first film in "Prologue: One Ring to Rule Them All" and repeated at each major event in the Ring's progress. The theme, in 4/4 time, is scored for first and second violins, viola, cello, and double bass.

For the soundtrack, the score was primarily played by the London Philharmonic Orchestra, ranging from 93 to 120 players throughout the recording. There are contributions by London Voices, the London Oratory School Schola boy choir, and artists such as Ben Del Maestro, Sheila Chandra, Enya, Renée Fleming, James Galway, Annie Lennox and Emilíana Torrini. The actors Billy Boyd, Viggo Mortensen, Liv Tyler, Miranda Otto (extended cuts only for the latter two) and Peter Jackson (for a single tam-tam sound in the second film) also contributed. Fran Walsh and Philippa Boyens wrote the libretto; David Salo translated it into Tolkien's constructed languages. The third film's end song, "Into the West", was a tribute to a young filmmaker Jackson and Walsh befriended named Cameron Duncan, who died of cancer in 2003.

In keeping with his operatic vision, Shore used the three scripts and the book itself to write themes even before having film reels to compose to. As a result, Shore spent nearly four years on the composition, compared to the 6–8 weeks per film, and a week or two of recording, typical for film composers. For the recording process, which extended over four weeks per film, he arranged the music in long suite-like pieces for the orchestra to go through during a day of playing, rather than short cues, making the score more cohesive. Only a few minutes of finalized music were recorded each day, to allow for input from director Peter Jackson and revisions to the music and performance. Shore began his work on the music early in the production of The Fellowship of the Ring, in late 2000. He recorded the first pieces of music, the Moria sequence, early in 2001.

Shore's orchestration called for an immense ensemble: a core 96-piece orchestra and 100-piece choir, as well as additional instruments for select sections of the score, onstage instrumental "bands" and additional choirs: overall, over 330 players. Among the less-usual instruments are contrabass clarinet in B♭ for Gollum's theme, (Note: Shore calls for one contrabass clarinet in B♭ for a humorous rendition of Gollum's theme in The Two Towers. The Pity of Smeagol Archived 11 March 2007 at the Wayback Machine (listening sample)) horns doubling on Wagner tubas and trumpets in C, F, B♭ and with rotary valves.

=== Use of Middle-earth languages ===
The film score for The Lord of the Rings incorporates extensive vocal music blended with the orchestral arrangements. The great majority of the lyrics used in the libretto are in the invented languages of Middle-earth, representing the various cultures and races in Tolkien's writings. These languages include Quenya and Sindarin for the Elves, Adûnaic and Rohirric for Men, and Khuzdul for the Dwarves. The score follows Tolkien's use of Old English as an analogue for Rohirric, while English is used as an analogue for the Common Tongue. Some of these languages had been developed extensively by Tolkien, while others were extrapolated by the linguist David Salo based on the limited samples of vocabulary and linguistic style available.

"Footsteps of Doom"
Heard in "Prologue: One Ring to Rule Them All"
J. R. R. Tolkien, adapted by Philippa Boyens
Sindarin by David Salo

Who enters here?
Who brings to us this token of Doom?
That which has stood so long against the darkness
Will now fall.

Man sí minna?
Man ammen toltha i dann hen Amarth?
I anann darthant dam morn
Si dannatha.

For example, the "Footsteps of Doom" song, in Sindarin, is heard in the "Prologue: One Ring to Rule Them All" introductory chapter of the film trilogy, at the start of The Fellowship of the Ring. To a spoken narration by Cate Blanchett as the Elf-lady (Note: Galadriel is an Elf-lady of high birth; she is effectively a Queen, as she is the ruler of Lothlórien.) Galadriel, scenes of a long and violent history unfurl on screen, overlaid with several of Shore's themes, including "Lothlórien" for the Elves, (Note: Lothlórien/Galadriel theme Archived 11 March 2007 at the Wayback Machine (listening sample)) "Threat of Mordor", (Note: The Threat of Mordor (the chase) Archived 30 July 2017 at the Wayback Machine (listening sample)) "Sauron", "Evil of the Ring", "Ringwraith", (Note: The Servants of Sauron" theme (the Nazgûl) Archived 29 September 2017 at the Wayback Machine (listening sample)) and "Footsteps of Doom" for the forces of the Dark Lord; "Fall of Men", "Gondor in Decline", (Note: Gondor in Decline theme Archived 29 September 2017 at the Wayback Machine (listening sample)) and "Minas Tirith" (Note: Minas Tirith/White Tree theme Archived 29 September 2017 at the Wayback Machine (listening sample)) for the human allies of the Elves; and throughout the Prologue, the "History of the Ring" theme as the One Ring passes from one owner to another.

The libretto was derived from several sources, including songs and poems written by Tolkien, phrases from the screenplay (often sung against the corresponding dialogue or recitation) as well as original and adapted material from Shore and from screenwriters Fran Walsh, Philippa Boyens, and others, all translated by Salo while stressing good choral sounds.

=== Songs and diegetic music ===
The score includes a series of songs, some diegetic, some not. A selection of them, with the associated underscore, were released as single CD releases and music videos featuring footage from the film and the production, prior to the release of the entire soundtracks.

The scene of Bilbo's farewell party, with the hobbits dancing to diegetic music by Plan 9, ostensibly being played by the musicians visible at the top right of the image.

Some of the diegetic songs were not composed by Shore, but he orchestrated and conducted the orchestral accompaniment and even reprised some of them in his symphony. Thus, Bilbo's farewell party sees the hobbits celebrating and dancing vigorously to music by Plan 9, a group who had long worked with Peter Jackson and Fran Walsh. Shore commented that their music had "the right feel" for the scene, and liked the difference from his own music.

A few of the diegetic songs are settings of poems by Tolkien, interspersed in the text of The Lord of the Rings. Among these is "The Road Goes Ever On", sung softly by Ian McKellen playing Gandalf arriving in Hobbiton in his farm cart, to a melody by Walsh.

Some of the non-diegetic songs, too, were by other composers; for instance, "May It Be" and Aníron (the theme for Aragorn and Arwen) were composed and sung by the Irish singer and songwriter of modern Celtic music Enya. "The Funeral of Théodred" in The Two Towers was composed by Plan 9 and performed by the actor Miranda Otto, playing Éowyn; the words are not Tolkien's.

=== Symphony ===
For the music to be played as the six-movement The Lord of the Rings Symphony, over 200 musicians and singers are required on stage. To suit the complex narrative, with its contrasting cultures, Shore wrote music in different styles for each of the peoples of Middle-earth. For the Elves, the music is mainly women's voices, Rivendell (Note: Rivendell theme Archived 30 July 2017 at the Wayback Machine (melody and arpeggio accompaniment) a theme for female chorus, along with a signature arpeggio accompaniment, which is treated thematically, as well.) designed to appear as a timeless place of learning, while Lothlórien was by intention "mystical and exotic". In contrast, the Orcs of Isengard were accompanied by a 5-beat rhythm on steel plates, Japanese drums, and metal chains, giving a harsh industrial effect. For Gollum, a corrupted Hobbit in two minds with a strange way of moving, Shore used the cimbalom, an instrument like a medieval hammered dulcimer, giving a trembling feeling. For some concerts conducted by Shore, images of Middle-earth by the films' concept artists Alan Lee and John Howe were projected while the music was played.

There are over 50 leitmotifs in the music; the symphony begins with the rising and falling "The History of the Ring" theme with a "breathlike pattern to give the Ring a sense of consciousness and purpose". Shore comments that this could be taken as the central theme of the score. The "Fellowship" theme appears when the nine heroes, the Fellowship of the Ring, first come together at the Council of Elrond at Rivendell; the theme splinters when the Fellowship breaks apart, and gradually reassembles as the Fellowship makes progress with its task. The symphony is edited to concert length from over 11 hours of film music. The symphony has a 19th-century structure to give the audience a sense of history, hinting at the great lapse of time since the Third Age of Middle-earth. Shore, with Jackson and Walsh, wanted it to feel like opera. To represent the evolution of characters, the themes change; thus, the Hobbits' tin whistle is replaced by a flute when they return to the Shire. That return, to save the Shire, is a central theme of the story, accompanied by the Hobbits' theme.

Live to Projection is a series where The Lord of the Rings films (their soundtrack limited to dialogue and sound effects) are projected while the music is performed live in sync with the films. It is conducted by Ludwig Wicki and Erik Eino Ochsner and was performed around the world, including Switzerland, Australia and the United States. The concerts, which consist of multiple movements, restore unused or alternate sections of the soundtrack (where other concerts of this kind for other films repeat the final film music) and even required Shore to edit several bars of the music, including a feature entr'acte suite.

== Analysis ==
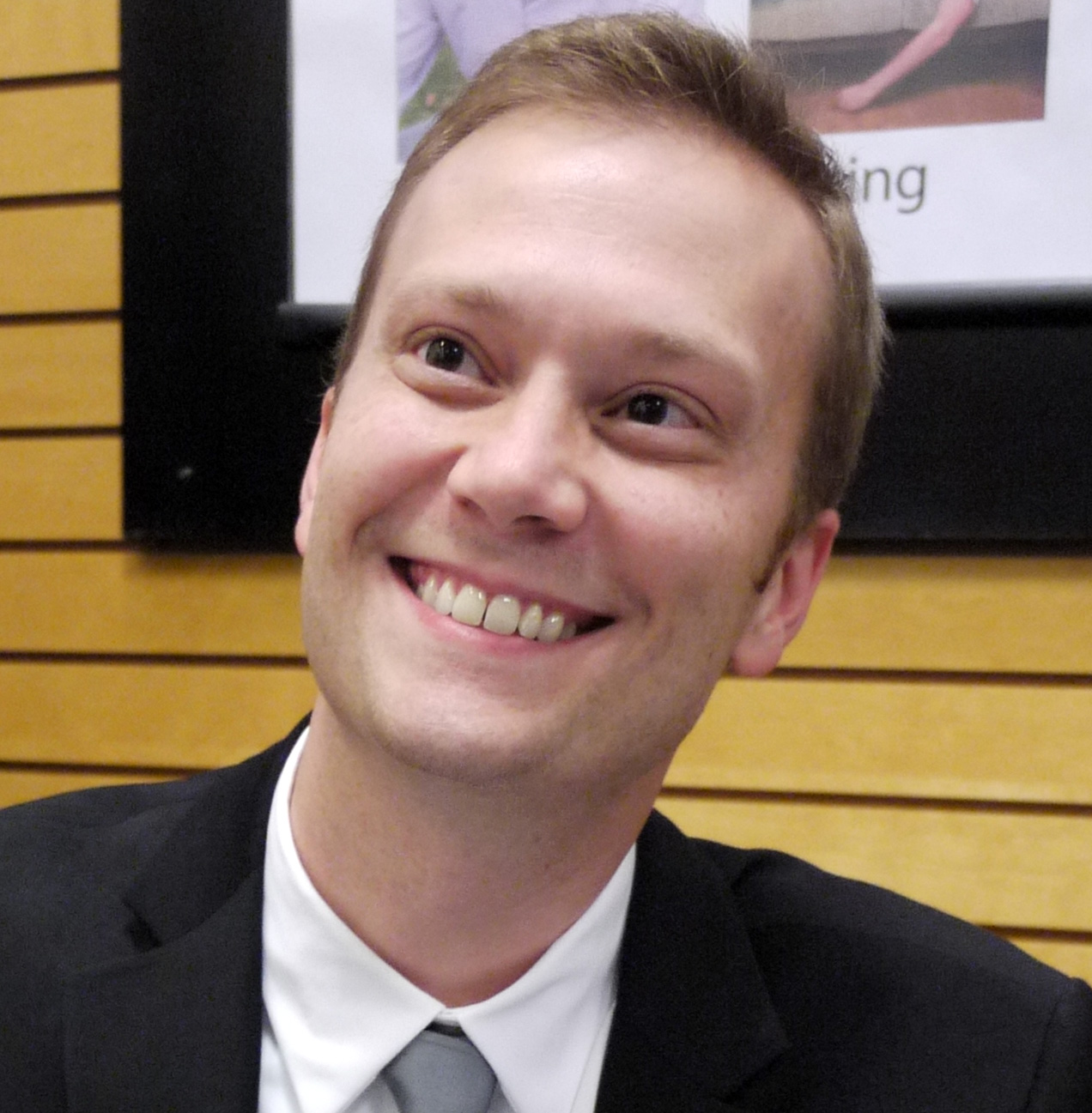
The musicologist Doug Adams enjoyed unique long-term access to Shore during the composition period to document and analyse the film scores.

In 2010, the musicologist and music journalist Doug Adams published what is effectively the official book of Shore's scores for the films, The Music of the Lord of the Rings Films, as Shore had invited him to "organize and present a cohesive view of the score". The book is based on unique long-term access to Shore throughout the four-year composition period. It is illustrated with drawings by the films' concept artists, the illustrators John Howe and Alan Lee. Shore describes the book as "a wonderfully readable version of what I created in music". He states that Adams became a friend, and "from all of his detailed study, [is] much more an expert in this music than I am!" The films' writer/producer Fran Walsh writes in the foreword that "Howard's music ... gave the cultures of the Elves and the Dwarves and the kingdoms of Men a powerful authenticity", and that "I feel enormously proud that [Shore's] beautiful work, beloved by so many around the world, has been so eloquently celebrated by Doug Adams in this fine book."

=== Leitmotifs ===
The scores's themes or leitmotifs can be grouped by the Middle-earth cultures to which they relate. (Note: Shore states there are "over 50" themes; he notes that the themes change, so the exact number depends on whether a variant is counted as a new theme or not.) Adams names each theme, with the film scene where it is first heard; it is shown in musical notation, and then described in a few paragraphs of text. When Adams has identified other themes on related subjects, they immediately follow in the same section. Thus, the first section on themes is "The One Ring", with the main theme "The History of the Ring", followed by "The Evil of the Ring (Mordor/Sauron)", "The Seduction of the Ring", (Note: The Seduction of the Ring Archived 11 March 2007 at the Wayback Machine (listening sample)) and "The Fate of the Ring/The Destruction of the Ring". The account is illustrated both with pencil drawings by the artists and by stills from the films.

Adams states that Shore instinctively started with themes to ensure musical clarity. The first theme, "The Shire", (Note: The Shire, Hymn setting Archived 18 December 2022 at the Wayback Machine (listening Sample)) may serve as an example. It features both in the films, many times, and in Shore's concert suite Concerning Hobbits. The melody, all in one key, occurs in pensive, rural, and hymn settings. (Note: Eric Rawlins, in his 2006 analysis of the score, notes the similarity of the melody to a Methodist hymn, "This Is My Father's World", with the first seven notes identical. The hymn can be heard at Hymnsite.com.) The pensive setting (Note: The Shire, Pensive setting Archived 11 March 2007 at the Wayback Machine (listening sample)) is played classically, with the melody on whistle or clarinet according to the mood of the moment. The rural setting (Note: The Shire, Rural setting Archived 18 December 2022 at the Wayback Machine (listening sample)) changes the theme into "a sprightly, Celtic-influenced peasant melody—the simple joy of Hobbiton in musical form." Adams notes that Shore commented that he wanted to give the impression that "the hobbits were playing the music", while Jackson said "Make it hobbity."

Shore's first theme was "The Shire". It appears in multiple settings, the first being what Adams calls the "Pensive Setting", heard in the scene "The Shire" in the 2001 film The Fellowship of the Ring. Adams presents each setting with title, scene, melody, and artwork alongside his analysis.

Shore combined all three variations of "The Shire" in the end credits of The Fellowship of the Ring to create the song "In Dreams". The song has lyrics by Fran Walsh, and the film version is sung by the boy soprano Edward Ross of the London Oratory School Schola. Adams comments that "Like all Shore's music for the hobbits, this song is designed to feel as if it could be both about the Shire and from it—as if it were some sweetly nostalgic song sung at the closing of the Green Dragon [Inn] each night."

=== Orchestration ===
Hijaz
Shore used the Arabic maqam Hijaz scale to give an Elvish theme a sense of antiquity.

"The Shire" was soon followed by the Fellowship, Moria, and Dwarrowdelf (Note: Dwarrowdelf theme Archived 29 September 2017 at the Wayback Machine (listening sample)) themes. The Fellowship theme first appears when the Fellowship of the Ring is created in Rivendell; it is often played on the orchestra's horns. The Ring theme has a Middle-eastern sound, unfamiliar to a Western audience, helping to convey the Ring's ability to corrupt its bearers; it uses a wind instrument the double-reed rhaita from Morocco. The Rohan theme (Note: Rohan theme Archived 28 September 2017 at the Wayback Machine) makes use of the Norwegian hardanger fiddle, reflecting Jackson's depiction of the Rohirrim as from Northern Europe.

Shore worked from research into Western, African, and Middle-eastern music, from storyboards of the films; and sometimes straight from Tolkien's story. For example, he used the Arabic maqam Hijaz scale for the Elvish Lothlórien/Galadriel theme, to create a sense of antiquity.

The number of themes multiplied, but Shore took care to keep the orchestration to a limited "menu", so as to maintain a vision of "sturdy musical textures with orchestral color and detail coursing under the surface." Shore divided the orchestra to provide high, middle, and low sound degrees "regardless of instrument type"; Adams cites Shore's remark that "Orchestration is, in essence, about range. People think it's color, but it actually is range." The themes meanwhile evolved into "an interconnected network of dozens of leitmotifs", becoming not as Shore had anticipated in the style of Italian opera, but rather in the manner of Wagner and German opera. Adams describes the final bars of the score of The Return of the King as Wagnerian. Judith Bernanke similarly analyses Shore's "operatic" approach.

Construction of the music for The Lord of the Rings films, from Tolkien's work to Howard Shore's score, with clickable links.

=== Annotated score ===
The start of "The King"
Heard in "The Court of Meduseld"
Philippa Boyens
Old English by David Salo

Strong-limbed he was born
The son of kings
The warrior of Rohan.
Bound by birth
To lead
Bound by love
To serve...

Lim-strang wæs geboren
Bearn léod-cyninga
Magorinc Mearces.
Bunden in byrde
Tó lædenne
Bunden in lufe
Tó þegnunge...

Adams describes the score for the three films of the trilogy in turn, scene by scene. He names the musical themes as they appear in each scene: the themes often recur. When a scene is accompanied by choral music, the lyrics are provided; when these are in one of Tolkien's constructed languages, an English translation is given alongside, line for line, and the source of the text (often Tolkien or the screenwriter/producer Philippa Boyens) and the translator (usually Salo) is stated.

For example, for the scene "The Court of Meduseld" in The Two Towers, Adams describes the picture as Théoden King of Rohan sits slumped in his throne, being whispered lies by Saruman's spy, the traitor Wormtongue. The music is the "Gríma Wormtongue" theme, in which "contrabassoon, tuba, celli, and contrabasses wallow in a sepulchral, debauched chromatic line... colored by resonant bass drum strokes and a film of high string clusters." The music shifts as the wizard Gandalf and his companions Legolas and Gimli enter: the chorus sing "The King" (in Old English, the language Tolkien uses for Rohan), and the orchestra plays in turn the "Isengard" theme (for Saruman), the "Fellowship" theme (for Legolas and Gimli), and the "Gandalf the White" theme (for the wizard, returned from the dead). The account is illustrated with a drawing of the King on the throne, Wormtongue's head visible by his right arm; with the music of the "Wormtongue" theme modified by the "Rohan" theme's beat and Dorian mode; by a film still of the head of the aged and despondent king; and by the lyrics of "The King" in Old English and in translation.

== Reception ==
=== Awards ===
The scores and soundtrack albums of the film trilogy have won three Academy Awards, three Golden Globe awards, and four Grammy Awards, including:

- The Fellowship of the Ring won an Academy Award for Best Original Score and a Grammy Award for Best Score Soundtrack Album in 2001.
- The Two Towers won a Grammy Award for Best Score Soundtrack Album in 2002.
- The Return of the King won an Academy Award for Best Original Score, an Academy Award for Best Original Song with "Into the West" by Annie Lennox, a Golden Globe Award for Best Original Score, and a Grammy Award for Best Score Soundtrack Album in 2003.

=== By critics ===
The philosopher and author Roger Scruton, for the Future Symphony Institute, notes that the phrase "film music" has, however unfairly, often been used pejoratively by critics. He writes that, on the contrary, "the most successful film music today exhibits a quite extraordinary level of competence." In Scruton's view, "Howard Shore's evocative music for The Lord of the Rings exhibit[s] a mastery of harmonic sequences, polyphonic organisation and orchestral effect that would be the envy of many a composer for the concert hall."

=== By Tolkien scholars ===
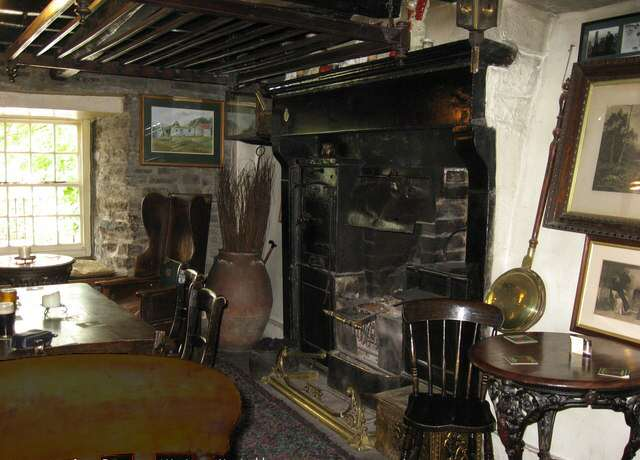
Shore's choice of Celtic music for the Shire has been criticised, as Tolkien's rural setting with comfortable pubs (the Green Dragon Inn at Hardraw pictured) was inspired by England.

Kristin Thompson, in the scholarly book Picturing Tolkien, writes that "even the film [series]'s harshest critics credit it with ... superb design elements, including ... music".

David Bratman, in his survey of music inspired by Tolkien, provides what Mythlore called "justified and sharp" criticisms of the film score. Bratman describes the score as "uninspired hackwork" and states that Shore's Celtic music representing the Shire (played on a "Celtic assortment of instruments", namely bodhrán, dulcimer, Celtic harp, musette, mandolin, and guitar) is inappropriate, given that the hobbits' homeland was inspired by the English Midlands where Tolkien lived.

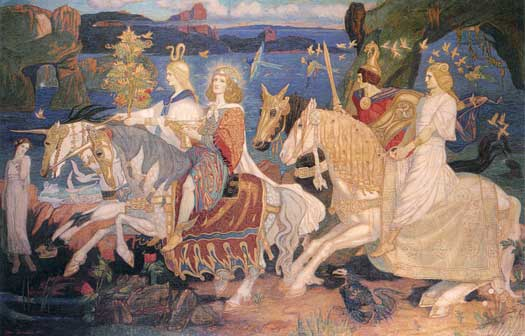
Dimitra Fimi writes that the Celtic music for the film scene "Arwen's vision" supports Peter Jackson's treatment of the Elves in the style of John Duncan's 1911 painting Riders of the Sidhe.

The folklorist Dimitra Fimi, also in Picturing Tolkien, comments that "ethereal music" (Note: "The Elvish Lament", with Tolkien's Sindarin poem A Elbereth Gilthoniel) accompanies the procession of Elves in the extended version of The Fellowship of the Ring (scene 11, "The Passing of the Elves"). She states that the scene borrows visually from the "Celtic" imagery of John Duncan's 1911 Pre-Raphaelite painting Riders of the Sidhe, giving an "otherworldly" effect very unlike the "playful tone" in Tolkien's text. Shore deliberately creates the "same 'Celtic feel'", she writes, in the music for the Elves in Rivendell; Shore had approached the Irish "folk-cum-New Age" singer Enya, whose music represents "Celticity as melancholy over a lost tradition." In Fimi's view, the "'Celtic' air and ambience" that Jackson uses for the Elves is reinforced by what Alan Lee called "the use of natural forms ... [and] of flowing graceful lines" and "elements of Art Nouveau and Celtic design". Fimi notes that both Tolkien and the historian Malcolm Chapman wrote "mocking[ly]" about the romantic stereotyping of Celts in this way, Tolkien speaking of "the wild incalculable poetic Celt, full of vague and misty imaginations", and Chapman of "high-flown metaphysical and moral conclusions drawn from 'Celtic' art by its admiring critics".

The translator Vincent Ferré, discussing what Tolkien might have thought of Jackson, given his comments on the now-lost script by Morton Grady Zimmerman, finds Shore's music "the most unengaging aspect" of the films, describing it as "sometimes so jarringly emphatic that the whole scene is dragged down into pomposity and slushiness."

The linguist and Egyptologist Alexandra Velten considers the lyrics in Tolkien's constructed languages – Adûnaic, Black Speech, Khuzdul, Rohirric, Quenya, and Sindarin – that are used for the songs. She notes the serious "thought and detail" that went into making the lyrics, accurately translated into these languages, and that they convey "certain important ideas". She comments that this successfully follows Tolkien in believing, in Tom Shippey's words, "that untranslated elvish would do a job that English could not". Further, Velten argues that Tolkien's motifs of environmentalism, destiny, and keeping up one's courage "have all been incorporated in the soundtrack lyrics". She comments that "this is a feat", and concludes that "the textual legacy of Tolkien has been incorporated into the lyrics in an exemplary way."

=== By musicologists ===
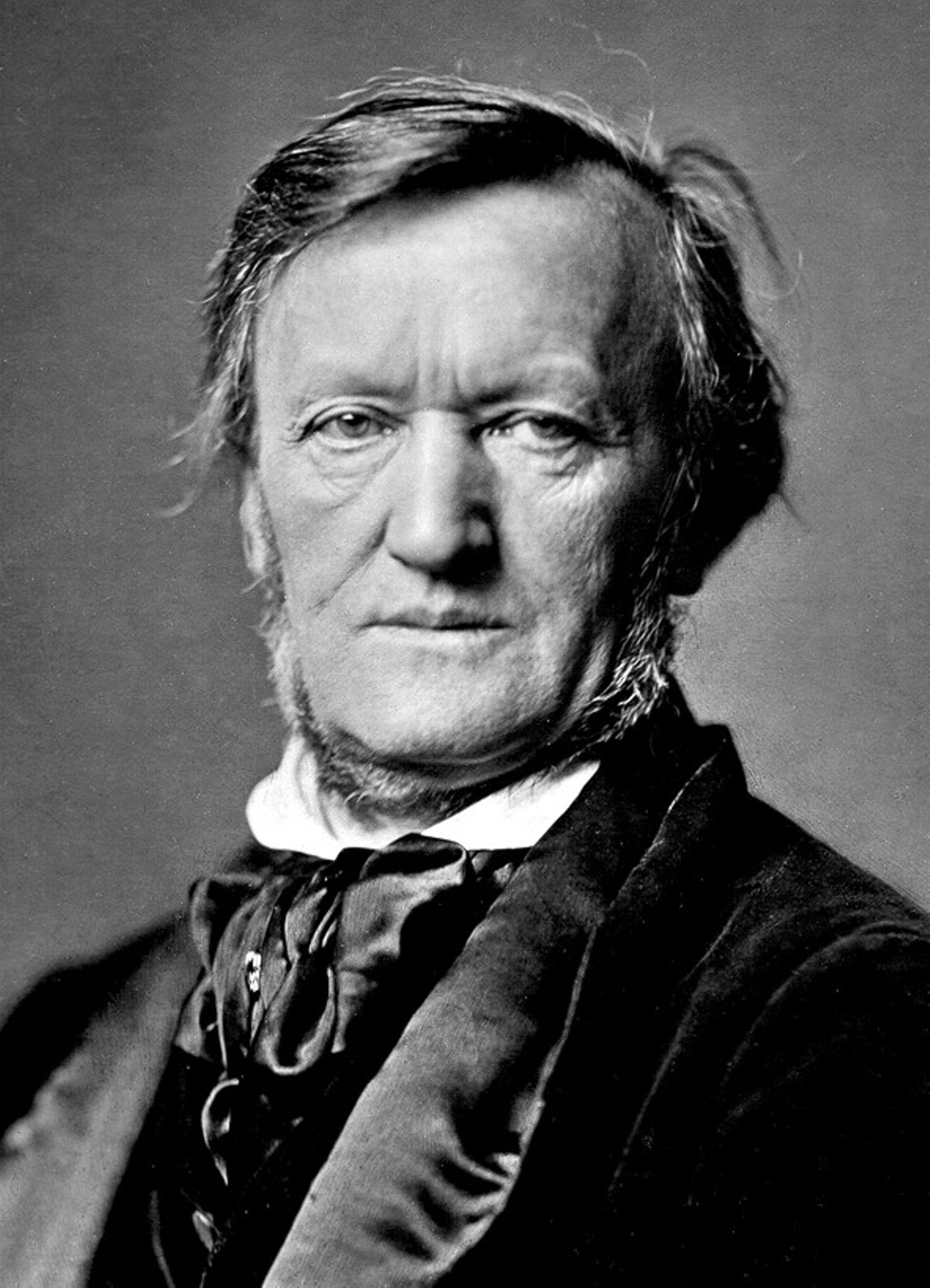
Shore has been described as favouring "Wagnerian leitmotifs", but Vincent E. Rone calls the score "far more nuanced" than that. 1871 portrait of Richard Wagner.

Vincent E. Rone writes that while many commentators noticed that Shore had borrowed techniques from "Romantic opera, especially his predilection for Wagnerian leitmotifs", the score is "far more nuanced" than that, identifying each people – Hobbits, Men, Elves – with their own system of harmony. In Rone's view, Hobbits are placed harmonically as familiar, using major-minor diatonic scales. Men are placed as at once familiar and unfamiliar, by means of modal diatonic scales. Finally, Elves are placed as unfamiliar, through the use of nondiatonic scales ("chromatic mediants"). Rone suggests that in this way the film score both echoes 19th century tradition and helps the viewer to understand the different peoples in the fantasy.

Matthew Young sets out to show that Shore's music is rooted both in Jackson's visual narrative and in Tolkien's text, and that Shore's leitmotifs give the audience a precise "musical affect" for the different cultures of Middle-earth. Young does this by analysing musemes, individual elements of the music analogous to phonemes in speech. Young further suggests that the way the themes change during the film series conveys to the audience an "emotional understanding of the evolution of the [leading] characters". For example, Young analyses the Shire Fiddle theme in The Fellowship of the Ring, arguing that the fiddle and flute used relate to Tolkien's Hobbits, while in his view "the rural nature of Celtic music is consistent with the rural, peasant nature of Hobbits described by Tolkien."

Estelle Jorgensen considers how Tolkien's text translates to film, and in particular how the implicit music of Tolkien's poetry is realized, both visually and aurally. She cites Jackson's remark that Tolkien's "music" is "imaginary", objecting only that his Gregorian chanting of "Namárië" and his "dramatic" performance of "Ride of the Rohirrim" give "a glimpse" of how he imagined his songs might have sounded. Jackson, she writes, omitted Tom Bombadil and Goldberry, along with all their music; and Galadriel's singing, too, is dropped. Jackson acknowledged his musical limitations, relying on Shore to represent Tolkien's music. Shore stated that he wanted to "re-insert" Tolkien's verse into his score with choral versions of songs in Tolkien's invented languages. Jorgensen comments that be that as it may, songs such as "May it Be" and "Aníron" are set to words not by Tolkien, while most of Tolkien's "rich" provision of Hobbit songs is absent from the score. She notes that the score is "pervasively orchestral and tonal" in keeping with Shore's intention to create "a feeling of antiquity", almost as if the music had been "discovered" rather than newly written. She comments that the actual result is rather different: "What happens, however, is that while the music lends another dimension to sight, it is swallowed up by sight...; the audience's focus is primarily upon the screen."

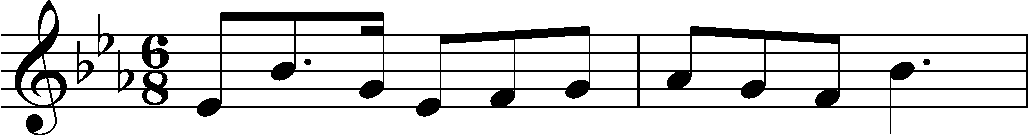
Siegfried's theme (Note: Siegfried's horn call, Waldknabenruf) from Wagner's Götterdämmerung is quoted briefly and "ambiguous[ly]" in The Return of the King's end credits.

The scholar of film music Kevin Donnelly describes the end credits of The Return of the King DVD as containing "a bizarre sonic occurrence", a quotation of Wagner's Siegfried theme from his Ring of the Nibelungen opera cycle. He calls this ambiguous, as it might be referring to the evident resemblance of The Lord of the Rings to Wagner's operas, or "obliquely" to the question of race in Middle-earth, whether depicted by Tolkien or Jackson. Donnelly cites Mark Brownrigg as stating that Shore's score "marks a homology between [Wagner's] nibelungen and the Orcs", commenting that the parallel makes Shore's use of Wagner-style leitmotifs "apt". He is less certain of the appropriateness of the use of sounds from the Maghreb and the Arab world more generally for themes representing evil. These include the evil wizard Saruman's Isengard and the Dark Lord Sauron's Mordor (which like the equally evil Ring theme uses the rhaita), something that Donnelly calls "a fairly problematic use of musical representation".

Donnelly, noting that Shore treated the music as a whole, unlike in most films, quotes Shore's account of his intention: "The concept is opera and it's the reverse of writing an opera and then having it staged. What I'm trying to do is [to] have the same feeling so that when you watch the film, it feels seamless, it's almost like the film was created to music." Donnelly adds that at moments like the Battle of Helm's Deep, the fighting is "evident in the interplay of musical themes" as the Elvish archers' Lothlórien theme battles the Orcs' Isengard theme.

== Recordings ==
=== Original soundtracks ===
Recordings of the score were originally issued on single-disc albums, named The Fellowship of the Ring, The Two Towers, and The Return of the King, that closely followed the cinematic releases of the films, or presented earlier versions recorded during the film's editing. The music on the disc was arranged as a concert-piece while also keeping reasonably with the plot progression of the film.

=== The Complete Recordings ===
Starting in 2005, a year after the extended release of The Return of the King, Reprise Records released one multi-disc set for each part of the trilogy. These annually published collections, titled The Complete Recordings, contain the entire score for the extended versions of the films on CD, along with an additional DVD-Audio disc that offers 2.0 stereo and 5.1 surround mixes of the soundtrack, and liner notes by Doug Adams. They were re-released in 2018 by Rhino Entertainment.

=== The Rarities Archives ===
The 2010 book by Doug Adams, The Music of the Lord of the Rings Films, contains a companion CD, The Rarities Archives, of alternate versions and otherwise unpublished music created during the composition process.

=== Documentary films ===
Two short documentary films have been made of the score's production process: Howard Shore: An Introspective, released as a bonus DVD with The Return Of The King in 2003, and Howard Shore - Creating The Lord Of The Rings Symphony, the latter recorded live in Montreal at the Salle Wilfrid-Pelletier in 2004.

== See also ==
- The Lord of the Rings (soundtrack), the score of the 1978 Ralph Bakshi film by Leonard Rosenman.
- Symphony No. 1 "The Lord of the Rings", a 1988 concert band composition by Johan de Meij
- Music of The Hobbit film series
- Music of The Lord of the Rings: The War of the Rohirrim

== Sources ==
- Adams, Doug (2010). The Music of The Lord of the Rings Films. Éditions Didier Carpentier. ISBN 978-0-7390-7157-1.
- Bernanke, Judith (2008). "Howard Shore's Ring Cycle: The Film Score and Operatic Strategy". In Harriet Elaine Margolis; Sean Cubitt; Barry King; Thierry Jutel (eds.). Studying the Event Film: The Lord of the Rings. Manchester University Press. pp. 176–184. ISBN 978-0-7190-7198-0.
- Donnelly, Kevin J. (2006). "Musical Middle-earth". In Mathijs, Ernest (ed.). The Lord of the Rings : popular culture in global context. London: Wallflower Press. pp. 301–313. ISBN 978-1-904764-82-3. OCLC 64098191.
- Honegger, Thomas, ed. (2011b) [2004]. Translating Tolkien: Text and Film. Cormarë series. Vol. 6. Walking Tree Publishers. ISBN 978-3-9521424-9-3.
- Shore, Howard (2004). Howard Shore - Creating the Lord of the Rings Symphony: a Composer's Journey Through Middle-Earth (DVD). New Line Cinema. SHORE-90-AW. Online
- Young, Matthew David (2007). Projecting Tolkien's Musical Worlds: A Study of Musical Affect in Howard Shore's Soundtrack to Lord of the Rings. Saarbrücken: VDM Verlag Dr. Müller. ISBN 978-3-8364-2496-7.
