= The Prequels Strike Back: A Fan's Journey =

- Promotional release poster
- Directed by: Bradley Weatherholt
- Written by: Bradley Weatherholt
- Produced by: Kyle Brodeur; Matthew Todd Fielder; Frank Zoch; Bradley Weatherholt
- Cinematography: Tyler Gorrell
- Edited by: Kyle Brodeur
- Music by: Seth Wade Melancon
- Production company: Ministry of Cinema
- Release date: September 14, 2016
- Running time: 80 minutes
- Language: English

The Prequels Strike Back: A Fan's Journey is a 2016 American documentary film directed by Bradley Weatherholt about the Star Wars prequel trilogy. The film contains dozens of interviews from film scholars, critics, academics, and Star Wars fans. Notable interviews include film director Kevin Smith, film critic Chris Gore, actor Christian Simpson, music journalist Doug Adams, and Founding Curator of the Joseph Campbell Archives, Dr. Jonathan Young.

== Production ==
Crowdfunded with a modest budget, production took place over a year as interviews were conducted across the country.

== Release ==
The film was released digitally on September 14, 2016. A theatrical premiere took place on October 6, 2016 in Austin, Texas.

=== Reception ===
The Prequels Strike Back: A Fan's Journey received generally positive reviews from critics and fans alike. Chris Agar of Screen Rant noted the film "is a great watch for Star Wars fans and serves as a refreshing discussion on the prequels," while Richard Whittaker of The Austin Chronicle praised the film's deconstruction of George Lucas. Geeks of Doom's review noted: "You might be surprised at what you learn, and what you may have missed this entire time." The Star Wars Prequels Appreciation Society called the film "thoughtful," though it doubted the film would change the minds of "hellbent" fans. Many cite the film as playing a significant role in rethinking the legacy of the prequel films.
