= Music of The Hobbit film series =

Film scores by Howard Shore

The Hobbit
- Operatic film score cycle by Howard Shore
- Related: The Lord of the Rings
- Text: J. R. R. Tolkien, Philippa Boyens, Fran Walsh, Howard Shore
- Language: English, fictional languages (Sindarin, Quenya, Khuzdul, Black Speech, Adunaic)
- Composed: 2010–2014
- Movements: 78 movements (in three parts)
- Scoring: Soprano; baritone; tenor; mixed choir; boy choir; "Hobbit Band"; Gamelan orchestra; pipe organ; symphony orchestra

The music of The Hobbit film series is composed, orchestrated, and conducted by Howard Shore, who scored all three The Lord of the Rings films, to which The Hobbit film trilogy is a prequel series. It continues the style of The Lord of the Rings score, using a vast ensemble, multiple musical forms and styles, many leitmotifs, and unusual instruments.

Shore composed over nine hours of music, featuring many new themes and reprising 50 themes from The Lord of the Rings. The score calls for an ensemble of a symphony orchestra, stage "bands" featuring non-orchestral instruments, multiple choirs, and several vocal soloists.

While not as widely admired by critics as his The Lord of the Rings, Shore's score remained a financial success, peaking in the top ten album charts in multiple countries, and garnering award nominations. The setting of the "Misty Mountains" tune became popular. The score has since been performed as a symphonic piece in four movements for orchestra and soloist. The score and its production were the subject of an hour-long documentary film created for the behind-the-scenes features of The Desolation of Smaug.

With these three scores added to the music of The Lord of the Rings film series, Shore has composed by far the largest collection of themes in the history of cinema, and one of the biggest for any cycle of musical compositions.

== Structure of the music ==
=== Approach ===
Following the style of his music for The Lord of the Rings film series, Howard Shore constructed the score for The Hobbit using many strong recognisable musical themes. The musicologist Doug Adams described these as "an encyclopedic network of leitmotifs: dozens of themes that represented cultures, characters, objects, and dramatic concepts in Middle-earth." Individual themes change and evolve to signal the evolution of characters in the story. For example, Adams writes, the home-loving Bilbo's "Shire" theme starts out with "safe, warm harmonies and cozy melodic contours." The theme then "moves into a new key and exposes Bilbo’s emerging thirst for excitement with leaping intervals and a stout, confident tone" In contrast, the leader of the Dwarves, Thorin Oakenshield, seeking to regain his Kingdom under the mountain of Erebor, has a "proud, compact figure rising in three horn-calls, but remaining stubbornly affixed to its root (A–C; A–D; A–E)." Different again is the Elf-queen Galadriel's theme, an elegant Arabic maqam hijaz played on a woodwind instrument, the cor anglais. This accompanies female voices singing in Elvish Ninque sile mise nár / Nóna silme andané, meaning "A white fire shines within her / The light of a star, born long ago”".

As for The Lord of the Rings, Shore used an immense ensemble, including a symphony orchestra of 94 to 96 pieces; SATBB and boy choirs and vocal soloists; additional instruments to augment the orchestra in select passages, and onstage instrumental "bands". Overall, more than 300 pieces are used.

=== Soloists ===
As with The Lord of the Rings, many soloists performed in all three films. To support the more Dwarf-centric story, the singers of the end-credit songs were all men, contrasting with the female ensemble for The Lord of the Rings. This included Neil Finn, who performed "Song of the Lonely Mountain" in An Unexpected Journey, and later Ed Sheeran and Billy Boyd. Richard Armitage appears as a cast performer in the film itself. James Nesbitt performs a song of his own composition in the extended edition of An Unexpected Journey, while Barry Humphries performs two songs (one of them only in the Extended Edition).

Within the underscore, Shore utilized soprano voices, featuring Clara Sanabras and Grace Davidson, often in conjunction with the music of nature or the Elves. Unlike in The Lord of the Rings, no boy sopranos or young girls were called for in the score.

=== Songs ===
As with The Lord of the Rings, the scores from The Hobbit were largely vocal works, including choirs and soloists, as well as diegetic music, and songs for the end-credits of each film.

==== Source songs ====
Blunt the knives, bend the forks!
Smash the bottles and burn the corks!
Chip the glasses and crack the plates –
That’s what Bilbo Baggins hates!

— Verse 1 of "Blunt the Knives", from
The Hobbit, ch. 1 "An Unexpected Party"
- "Blunt the Knives": lyrics by J. R. R. Tolkien, musical setting by Stephen Gallagher. Performed by the Dwarf cast.
- "Misty Mountains": lyrics by J. R. R. Tolkien, musical setting by Plan 9 and David Long. It is transformed into a theme that appears in Shore's underscore.
- "The man in the Moon": Composed and performed by James Nesbitt.
- "Down in Goblin Town": Composed by Stephen Gallagher.
- "The Torture Song": Composed by Stephen Gallagher and Fran Walsh.

==== End-credits songs ====
- Song of the Lonely Mountain: Composed by David Long, Plan 9 and Neil Finn. Orchestrated and arranged by Victoria Kelly under the supervision of Howard Shore and performed by Neil Finn and sons and the London Metropolitan Orchestra. It is another setting of the "Misty Mountains" melody.
- "I See Fire": Composed and performed by Ed Sheeran.
- "The Last Goodbye": Composed by Billy Boyd. Orchestrated and arranged by Victoria Kelly under Shore's supervision. Performed by Billy Boyd and the London Metropolitan Orchestra.

=== Diegetic music ===
Shore composed "The Valley of Imladris" - a diegetic piece (heard by the characters) for lute, lyre, wood flute and harp performed in Rivendell. It is a recapitulation of a piece of music introduced in the underscore previously as Elrond rides into Rivendell to meet the Dwarves. Shore also composed the horn-call at the end of the Battle of the Five Armies, a statement of the Erebor theme. Sound effects used in Mirkwood and the Treasure Hoard scene, while non-diegetic, were performed by the orchestra and feature on the album.

Other diegetic music was composed by The Elvish Impersonators, Stephen Gallaghar and members of the cast, including the source songs and a "trumpet fanfare" that sends the Dwarves off to the Lonely Mountain.

=== Concert suites ===
In The Lord of the Rings original soundtrack releases, several pieces of music were edited out of their film order to create a concert-like program, with concert suites of various themes. With The Hobbit, the original release has been expanded and features most of the music from the film in its chronological order. Some of the pieces of music were edited or even conceived as concert suites:

- "Dreaming of Bag End" (Bilbo's Baggins/Took themes)
- "A Very Respectable Hobbit" (Bilbo's Adventure, Baggins and Fussy themes)
- "Erebor" (The secondary company theme)
- "The Dwarf Lords"
- "Beyond the Forest" (The various Woodland Realm themes)
- "Ironfoot" (Dain's theme and the new Laketown material)

"The Hobbit in Four Movements" is a symphony program constructed from "A Very Respectable Hobbit", "Beyond the Forest", "Smaug" and "Ironfoot".

== Recordings ==
=== An Unexpected Journey ===
Soundtracks for The Hobbit have been released in an extended, two-disc form, offering over two hours of music each, with liner notes by Doug Adams. The music is, for the most part, presented as it is in the film and by the film order, but some pieces were re-edited to create something more akin to a concert program. The music for the trailer of An Unexpected Journey was released for free by New Line.

The soundtrack album for An Unexpected Journey was released on 11 December 2012. It has been released in both Standard Edition and Special Edition, with both coming in a 2-disc format. Shore recorded the soundtrack at Abbey Road Studios and Air Lyndhurst in London.

The soundtrack was performed by the London Philharmonic Orchestra, London Voices and Tiffin' boy choir, with the soprano Clara Sanabras, Richard Armitage as a cast performer and Neil Finn for the end credits song.

The full score was nominated at the 11th Washington D.C. Area Film Critics Association Awards, and "Song of the Lonely Mountain" received a nomination for the Houston Film Critics Society Awards. In 2013, the score for An Unexpected Journey ranked ninth out of one hundred in Classic FM's top film scores. The album charted in several countries, reaching the top ten album charts in Korea and the United States. It was awarded a golden record certification in Canada.

=== The Desolation of Smaug ===
The soundtrack album for The Desolation of Smaug was released on 10 December 2013 in both Standard Edition and Special Edition. The cover of the Special Edition features the design used for the special edition of the soundtrack for An Unexpected Journey on a purple background. The scoring process was documented in an hour-long feature of the behind-the-scenes footage of the film.

The soundtrack was orchestrated by Conrad Pope and James Sizemore, with Pope conducting. It was performed by the New Zealand Symphony Orchestra, Wellington University Gamelan Orchestra, London Voices and Tiffin' boy choir, as well as featured vocal and instrumental soloists, namely soprano Grace Davidson and singer Ed Sheeran. The latter's Song, "I See Fire", was released as a single.

=== The Battle of the Five Armies ===
The soundtrack album for The Battle of the Five Armies was released on 8 December 2014. Both a Standard Edition and a Special Edition were released. The score was performed by the New Zealand Symphony Orchestra and Wellington University Gamelan Orchestra as it was for The Desolation of Smaug. The London Voices and soprano Grace Davidson provided the vocal performances. Billy Boyd, who played Peregrin Took in The Lord of the Rings, wrote and recorded the song "The Last Goodbye".

== Reception ==
Far over the Misty Mountains cold
To dungeons deep and caverns old
We must away ere break of day,
To find our long-forgotten gold.

— Verse 1 of the "Misty Mountains" song, from
The Hobbit, ch. 1 "An Unexpected Party"

Allmusic's reviewer wrote favourably about An Unexpected Journey, but noted that the soundtrack was not as "sweeping and epic as that for [Jackson's] The Lord of the Rings", attributing this to the smaller scale of Bilbo's adventure compared to the events of The Lord of the Rings. Examiner.com, however, was very positive, commenting that The Hobbit soundtrack matched the style and tone of The Lord of the Rings, and that the opening for An Unexpected Journey was much better than that of The Fellowship of the Ring. The song "Misty Mountains" became popular among Tolkien fans.

TheOneRing.net described the score of The Desolation of Smaug as "extraordinar[ily good]" with many new themes, noting in particular the Smaug theme which powerfully "dominates the later scenes", and the Tauriel theme which recalled "many a swashbuckling adventure from cinema history".

== See also ==
- Music of The Lord of the Rings film series
- Music of Star Wars – another film score with leitmotifs
