= Isabel Bayrakdarian =

Armenian-Canadian operatic soprano (born 1974)

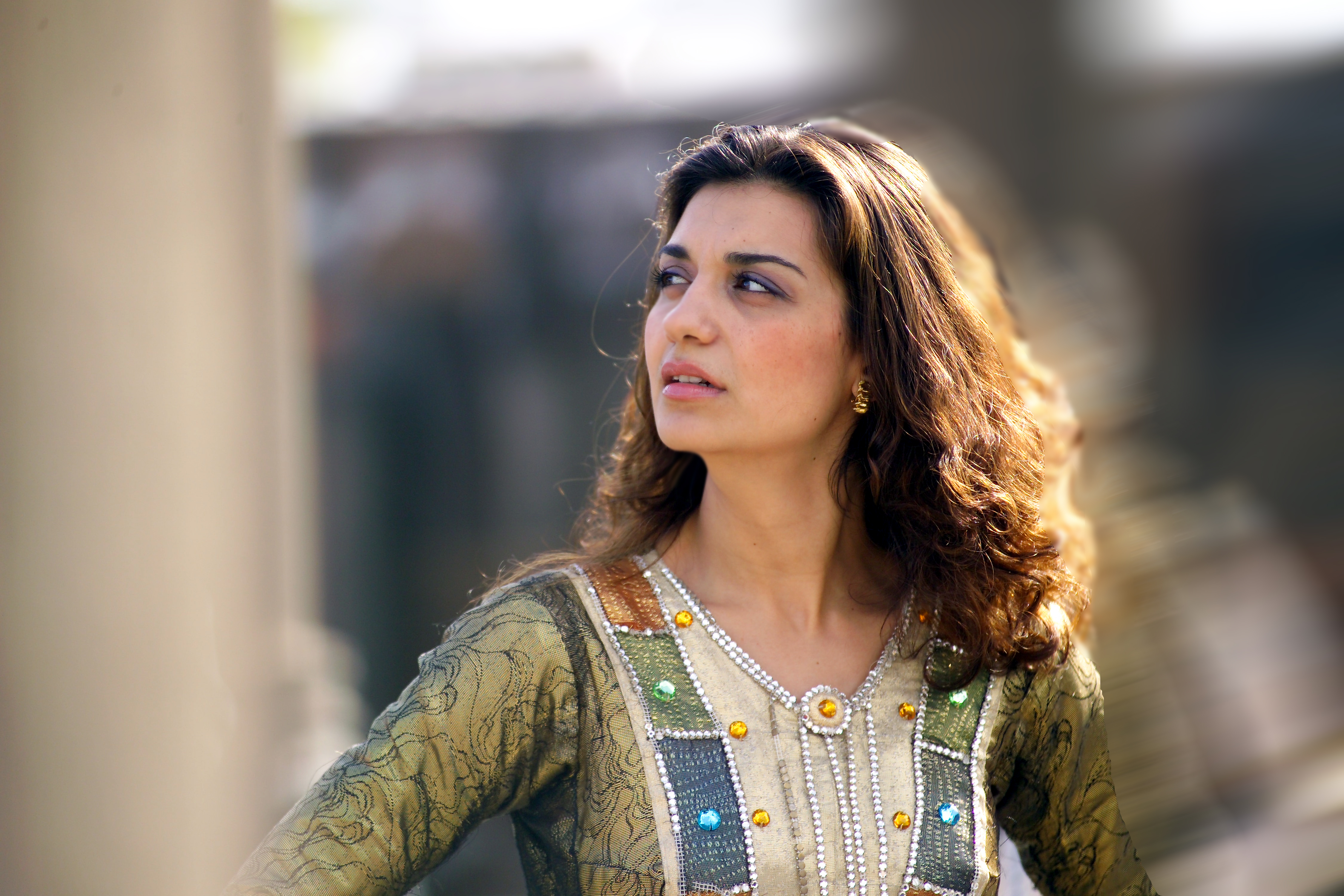
- Born: May 19, 1974 (age 52); Zahlé, Lebanon
- Occupation: Opera singer
- Years active: 2000–present
- Website: www.bayrakdarian.com

Isabel Bayrakdarian (Armenian: Իզապէլ Պայրագտարեան; born May 19, 1974) is a Lebanese-born Canadian operatic soprano of Armenian descent who now resides and works in the United States.

== Early life ==
Born in Zahlé, Lebanon, into an Armenian family, she moved to Canada as a teenager. Bayrakdarian graduated in 1997 from the University of Toronto with an honours Bachelor of Applied Science in Biomedical Engineering. She attended the Music Academy of the West in the summer of 1998, where she was the first winner of the Marilyn Horne Foundation Vocal Competition.

== Career ==
Bayrakdarian is noted as much for her stage presence as for her musicality, and she has followed a unique career path. Since winning first prize at the 2000 Operalia International Opera Competition founded by Plácido Domingo, she has launched an international opera career, appearing at the Metropolitan Opera, Royal Opera House, La Scala, Paris Opera, Lyric Opera of Chicago, Salzburg Festival, Dresden Semperoper, Bavarian State Opera, San Francisco Opera, Santa Fe Opera, and the Canadian Opera Company among others.

Her roles have included Euridice in Orfeo ed Euridice, Cleopatra in Giulio Cesare, Romilda in Serse, Emilia in Flavio, Susanna in The Marriage of Figaro, Zerlina in Don Giovanni, Pamina in The Magic Flute, Rosina in The Barber of Seville, Marzelline in Fidelio, Adina in L'elisir d'amore, Norina in Don Pasquale, Leila in Bizet's The Pearl Fishers, Teresa in Benvenuto Cellini, Mélisande in Pelléas et Mélisande, the Vixen in The Cunning Little Vixen, Blanche in Dialogues of the Carmelites, and Catherine in William Bolcom's A View from the Bridge.

Her concert schedule includes appearances with the Chicago, Montreal, Toronto, Pittsburgh, and San Francisco symphony orchestras, Los Angeles Philharmonic at the Hollywood Bowl, and the National Arts Centre Orchestra, singing under the baton of such conductors as Seiji Ozawa, James Conlon, David Zinman, Michael Tilson Thomas, Christoph von Dohnányi, Christoph Eschenbach, Colin Davis, Andrew Davis, Nikolaus Harnoncourt, Mariss Jansons, Leonard Slatkin, James Levine, Peter Oundjian and Richard Bradshaw.

Bayrakdarian is the subject of a film entitled A Long Journey Home that documents her first trip to Armenia. A major North American tour by Bayrakdarian in October 2008 featured the music of Komitas Vardapet with concerts in Toronto, San Francisco, Orange County, Vancouver, Toronto, Boston and New York's Carnegie Hall. She was accompanied by the Manitoba Chamber Orchestra conducted by Anne Manson. This Remembrance Tour was dedicated to victims of all genocides and was sponsored by the International Institute for Genocide and Human Rights Studies (a division of Zoryan Institute).

She now serves as Professor of Voice, Head of Voice Area, and Director of Opera Outreach at the University of California, Santa Barbara.

== Prizes ==
In addition to her first prize at the Operalia Competition and four consecutive Juno Awards, Bayrakdarian has been awarded the Queen Elizabeth II Golden Jubilee Medal, the 2005 Virginia Parker Prize from the Canada Council for the Arts, the Leonie Rysanek Award from the George London Foundation, the Mesrob Mashdots Medal on behalf of the Holy See of Cilicia on August 15, 2004, a Metropolitan Opera National Council Award in 1997, and Armenia's "Komitas Medal", bestowed upon by the Minister of Diaspora, Dr. Hranush Hakobian. Most recently, she was awarded the Movses Khorenatsi Medal—Armenia's highest cultural award—from the President of Armenia in celebration of Armenia's Independence, on September 21, 2017.

== Recordings ==
"Do Not Take the Willow from the Green Grove"
(Ukrainian: "Не беріть із зеленого лугу верби" by Yakiv Stepovy, performed by Isabel Bayrakdarian and Albert Krywolt (piano)

Her first recording, titled Joyous Light was released in March 2002 and rose to No. 1 in the Canadian classical charts. Soon afterwards, her vocals were featured in Atom Egoyan's film Ararat, and in the movie The Lord of the Rings: The Two Towers in the track "Evenstar".

Since then she has won four consecutive Juno Awards for "Classical Album of the Year – Vocal or Choral Performance" for the following recordings: Azulão (Bluebird), an album featuring Spanish and Latin American songs (2004); Cleopatra, featuring arias sung by the character Cleopatra from operas by Handel, Carl Heinrich Graun, Johann Adolph Hasse and Johann Mattheson (2004); Pauline Viardot: Lieder Chansons Canzoni Mazurkas, (2006); and Mozart: Arie e Duetti with fellow Canadians Russell Braun and Michael Schade (2007). In late 2007, Tango Notturno, a collection of tango songs, was released on CBC Records. Her album Isabel Bayrakdarian: Gomidas Songs, featuring songs by the 19th century Armenian composer Komitas Vardapet, was released on September 23, 2008, on the Nonesuch label and was nominated for a Grammy in the Best Classical Vocal Performance category.

Her dance music single "Angelicus" with the Vancouver electronica group Delerium made it to the top of Billboard Dance music charts in March 2007 and was nominated for a Grammy Award.

=== Popular and crossover ===
- Millennium Gala (2001, CBC Records)
- The Lord of the Rings: The Two Towers soundtrack (2002)
- Ararat soundtrack (2002)
- Guest on Delerium: Nuages du Monde (2006, Nettwerk)

=== Armenian ===
- Joyous Light, Armenian sacred songs, by Sahag Bartev (348–437), Abbot Khachatur of Taron (1100–1184), Vartabed Mekhitar of Ayrivank (1222–1307), St. Gregory of Nareg (951–1003), Komidas Vartabed, with the Elmer Iseler Chamber Orchestra, conducted by Raffi Armenian (CBC Records, 2002).
- Tango Notturno, tangos by Arno Babajanian (sung in Armenian), Fareed el-Atrache (sung in Arabic), Unto Mononen (sung in Finnish), Carlos Gardel and Aníbal Troilo (sung in Spanish), Kurt Weill (sung in French), Hans-Otto Borgmann (sung in German) (CBC Records, 2007).
- Gomidas Songs, by Komitas Vardapet, with Chamber Players of the Armenian Philharmonic conducted by Eduard Topchjan (Nonesuch, 2008).
- Lullaby, by Parsegh Ganatchian, on Armenian Chamber Music with Amici Chamber Ensemble (Atma Classique, 2010).
- Mother of Light, Armenian hymns and chants in praise of Mary, with Ani Aznavoorian (cello) and Coro Vox Aeterna conducted by Anna Hamre (Delos, 2016)

=== Classical ===
- Azulão, songs by Manuel de Falla, Enrique Granados, Carlos Guastavino, Xavier Montsalvatge, Fernando Obradors, Jaime Ovalle (CBC Records, 2003)
- Mahler: Symphony No. 2, with Lorraine Hunt Lieberson and the San Francisco Symphony & Chorus conducted by Michael Tilson Thomas (San Francisco Symphony, 2004)
- Cleopatra, by Handel, Mattheson and Hasse, with Tafelmusik Baroque Orchestra (CBC Records, 2004)
- Pauline Viardot: Lieder Chansons Canzoni Mazurkas (Analekta, 2004)
- Mozart: Arie e Duetti, with Russell Braun, Michael Schade and the Canadian Opera Company Orchestra, conducted by Richard Bradshaw (CBC Records, 2006)
- Passing By – Songs by Jake Heggie, with Zheng Cao, Susan Graham, Paul Groves, Joyce DiDonato, Keith Phares, Frederica von Stade, Dawn Harms (violin), CarlaMaria Rodrigues (viola), Emil Miland (cello) and Jake Heggie (piano) (Avie, 2010)
- Troubadour and the Nightingale, by Ravel, Sayat-Nova, Kradjian with the Manitoba Chamber Orchestra conducted by Anne Manson (MCO Records, 2014)
- Ottorino Respighi: Il Tramonto, with Orchestre symphonique de Laval conducted by Alain Trudel (Atma Classique, 2015)
- The Other Cleopatra – Queen of Armenia, by Hasse, Vivaldi and Gluck with the Kaunas City Symphony conducted by Constantine Orbelian (Delos, 2020)

== Filmography ==
- Opera Night at Cologne (2005)
- Handel: Serse (2005)
- A Long Journey Home (2005)
- Mozart: Don Giovanni. Live from Salzburg (2006)
- Great Performances at the Met: The Magic Flute (2007)
- Opera Under the Stars. Live in Ottawa at LeBreton Flats Park with the Canadian Opera Company (2007)
- The Time Traveler's Wife (2009)
