= Kaitlyn Lusk =

American singer

- Occupation: Singer
- Years active: 2003–present
- Website: www.kaitlynlusk.com

Kaitlyn Lusk is an American singer, best known as a vocalist in The Lord of the Rings Live to Projection concert series. She is a mezzo-soprano.

== Biography ==
Lusk credits her father as the largest influence on her.

She has been the vocalist in Lord of the Rings performances since she debuted with the Baltimore Symphony when she was 14 years old. She went on to sing "Into the West" from The Lord of the Rings as Howard Shore was being awarded for the song by the Grammy association, and became one of the featured vocalists of The Lord of the Rings Symphony (including the recorded Luzern performance) and The Lord of the Rings live-to-projection concerts, often filling in to perform all the various solo soprano and alto roles in the concert. She also performed the vocals of other film scores such as Gladiator and Titanic – both in suites, live-to-projection concerts and on her own album, film-song.
