= The Lord of the Rings: The Fellowship of the Ring (soundtrack) =

2001 soundtrack album by Howard Shore

Soundtrack album by Howard Shore
- Released: 20 November 2001
- Genres: Orchestral music, world music
- Length: 71:29
- Label: Reprise
- Producers: Howard Shore, Suzana Perić

Singles from The Lord of the Rings: The Fellowship of the Ring
- 1. "May It Be" Released: 2002

The Lord of the Rings: The Fellowship of the Ring: Original Motion Picture Soundtrack was released on 20 November 2001. It was composed, orchestrated, and conducted by Howard Shore, and performed by the London Philharmonic Orchestra, the New Zealand Symphony Orchestra, the London Voices, London Oratory School Schola choir and multiple featured instrumental and vocal soloists.

The album is a reduction of over three and a half hours of finalized music written for The Fellowship of the Ring. The music on the album features edited-down compositions and is presented in chronological order as heard in the theatrical film, with the exception of some cues in "Amon Hen" and the end credits mix from "The Breaking of the Fellowship".

Some cues are based on earlier drafts of the composition, written as the film was being edited. A prime example is the opening track, "The Prophecy", which is an alternative track that is unused in the final film. This was because the filmmakers intended to film a shorter prologue sequence (which a version of this track accompanied), but the idea was eventually dropped in favour of a more detailed and engaging sequence. The front cover for this CD was available in various designs.

== Reception ==
=== Critical reception ===
Professional ratings
Review scores
Source	Rating
AllMusic	4.5/5 stars
Filmtracks	5/5 stars
Movie Music UK	5/5 stars
Soundtrack.Net	5/5 stars
Tracksounds	9/10 stars

The Fellowship of the Ring received critical acclaim from music critics and won the Academy Award for Best Original Score, the Grammy Award for Best Score Soundtrack Album, and the World Soundtrack Award for Best Original Soundtrack.

=== Commercial performance ===
In the United Kingdom, the album peaked at number ten on the UK Albums Chart. As of December 2014, the album has sold 276,912 copies in the UK.

== Track listing ==
All music is composed by Howard Shore, except where noted.

No.	Title	Lyrics	Length
1.	"The Prophecy"	Philippa Boyens	3:55
2.	"Concerning Hobbits"		2:55
3.	"The Shadow of the Past"		3:32
4.	"The Treason of Isengard"		4:00
5.	"The Black Rider"		2:48
6.	"At the Sign of the Prancing Pony"		3:14
7.	"A Knife in the Dark"		3:34
8.	"Flight to the Ford"		4:14
9.	"Many Meetings"		3:05
10.	"The Council of Elrond" (feat. "Aníron (Theme for Aragorn and Arwen)", composed and performed by Enya)	Roma Ryan	3:49
11.	"The Ring Goes South"		2:03
12.	"A Journey in the Dark"		4:20
13.	"The Bridge of Khazad-dûm"		5:57
14.	"Lothlórien" (feat. "Lament for Gandalf" by Philippa Boyens and Howard Shore, performed by Elizabeth Fraser)	Boyens, Shore	4:33
15.	"The Great River"		2:42
16.	"Amon Hen"		5:02
17.	"The Breaking of the Fellowship" (feat. "In Dreams" by Fran Walsh and Howard Shore, performed by Edward Ross)	Fran Walsh, Shore	7:20
18.	"May It Be" (composed and performed by Enya)	Ryan	4:19
Total length:			71:29

Enya's songs are nestled inside Shore's music (neither of the two songs has an isolated track) and is accompanied by his music, performed by the London Philharmonic and London Voices. Enya went on to release a longer, alternate version of the song "Aníron", on The Very Best of Enya.

A special Limited Edition version of the original soundtrack was released in a faux-leather red cover. It did not contain any additional tracks.

== Charts and certifications ==
=== Weekly charts ===
Weekly chart performance for The Lord of the Rings: The Fellowship of the Ring
Chart (2001–2025)	Peak position
Australian Albums (ARIA)	8
Austrian Albums (Ö3 Austria)	2
Belgian Albums (Ultratop Flanders)	7
Belgian Albums (Ultratop Wallonia)	12
Canadian Albums (Billboard)	17
Croatian International Albums (HDU)	30
Czech Albums (ČNS IFPI)	1
Danish Albums (Hitlisten)	6
Finnish Albums (Suomen virallinen lista)	2
French Albums (SNEP)	18
German Albums (Offizielle Top 100)	3
Greek Albums (IFPI)	4
Hungarian Albums (MAHASZ)	37
Irish Albums (IRMA)	11
Irish Classical Albums (IRMA)	1
Dutch Albums (Album Top 100)	7
New Zealand Albums (RMNZ)	21
Norwegian Albums (VG-lista)	13
Swedish Albums (Sverigetopplistan)	6
Swiss Albums (Schweizer Hitparade)	8
UK Albums (Official Charts)	10
US Billboard 200	29
US Soundtrack Albums (Billboard)	2

=== Year-end charts ===
Year-end chart performance for The Lord of the Rings: The Fellowship of the Ring
Chart (2002)	Position
Austrian Albums (Ö3 Austria)	16
Belgian Albums (Ultratop Flanders)	69
Canadian Albums (Nielsen SoundScan)	94
Dutch Albums (Album Top 100)	41
French Albums (SNEP)	116
German Albums (Offizielle Top 100)	19
Swedish Albums (Sverigetopplistan)	39
Swiss Albums (Schweizer Hitparade)	85
UK Albums (OCC)	102
US Billboard 200	132
US Soundtrack Albums (Billboard)	9

== Certifications ==
Sales certifications for The Lord of the Rings: The Fellowship of the Ring
Region	Certification	Certified units/sales
Australia (ARIA)	Gold	35,000^{^}
Austria (IFPI Austria)	Gold	20,000^{*}
Belgium (BRMA)	Gold	25,000^{*}
Canada (Music Canada)	Gold	50,000^{^}
Denmark (IFPI Danmark)	Gold	25,000^{^}
Finland (Musiikkituottajat)	Gold	20,319
France (SNEP)	Gold	100,000^{*}
Germany (BVMI)	Platinum	300,000^{^}
Greece (IFPI Greece)	Gold	15,000^{^}
Hungary (MAHASZ)	Gold	
New Zealand (RMNZ)	Gold	7,500^{^}
Poland (ZPAV)	2× Platinum	200,000^{*}
Spain (Promusicae)	Platinum	100,000^{^}
Switzerland (IFPI Switzerland)	Gold	20,000^{^}
United Kingdom (BPI)	Platinum	300,000^{‡}
United States (RIAA)	Platinum	1,000,000^{^}
Summaries
Europe (IFPI)	Platinum	1,000,000^{*}
^{*} Sales figures based on certification alone.^{^} Shipments figures based on certification alone.^{‡} Sales+streaming figures based on certification alone.

== Complete recordings and additional music ==
In 2005, Reprise Records released a multi-disc set for the film, titled The Complete Recordings. These contain the entire score for the extended versions of the films on CD, along with an additional DVD-Audio disc that offers 2.0 stereo and 5.1 surround mixes of the soundtrack. Unlike the other two "Complete Recording" albums, this one was originally conceived as an "isolated score" of sorts, and therefore retains several loops and tracked pieces of music from the film, and omits pieces that were used in their stead or removed from the film.

The album also featured extensive liner notes by music journalist Doug Adams which reviews all of the tracks and provides information about the process of composing and recording the score, as well as a detailed list of all musical instruments, people and organizations involved. The cover artwork uses the film series' logo and an inscription in Tolkien's tengwar letters, over a background that depicts the Shire, Rhudaur and Eregion in dark red.

Track listing

Disc one
No.	Title	Length
1.	"Prologue: One Ring to Rule Them All"	7:16
2.	"The Shire"	2:29
3.	"Bag End" (feat. "The Road Goes Ever On", performed by Ian McKellen)	4:35
4.	"Very Old Friends"	3:12
5.	"Flaming Red Hair"	2:39
6.	"Farewell Dear Bilbo"	1:45
7.	"Keep It Secret, Keep It Safe" (feat. "The Road Goes Ever On", performed by Ian Holm; feat. Billy Boyd and Dominic Monaghan)	8:54
8.	"A Conspiracy Unmasked"	6:09
9.	"Three Is Company"	1:58
10.	"The Passing of the Elves"	2:39
11.	"Saruman the White"	4:09
12.	"A Shortcut to Mushrooms"	4:07
13.	"Strider"	2:34
14.	"The Nazgûl" (feat. "The Song of Beren and Lúthien", performed by Viggo Mortensen)	6:04
Total length:		58:30

Disc two
No.	Title	Length
1.	"Weathertop"	2:14
2.	"The Caverns of Isengard"	4:54
3.	"Give Up the Halfling"	4:49
4.	"Orthanc"	1:06
5.	"Rivendell"	3:26
6.	"The Sword That Was Broken"	3:34
7.	"The Council of Elrond Assembles" (feat. "Aníron (Theme for Aragorn and Arwen)", composed & performed by Enya)	4:01
8.	"The Great Eye"	5:30
9.	"Gilraen's Memorial"	5:01
10.	"The Pass of Caradhras"	5:04
11.	"The Doors of Durin"	6:03
12.	"Moria"	2:27
13.	"Gollum"	2:26
14.	"Balin's Tomb"	8:30
Total length:		59:05

Disc three
No.	Title	Length
1.	"Khazad-dûm"	8:00
2.	"Caras Galadhon" (feat. "Lament for Gandalf", performed by Elizabeth Fraser)	9:20
3.	"The Mirror of Galadriel"	6:21
4.	"The Fighting Uruk-hai"	11:32
5.	"Parth Galen"	9:13
6.	"The Departure of Boromir"	5:29
7.	"The Road Goes Ever On... (Part 1)"	5:58
8.	"May It Be" (composed & performed by Enya)	3:26
9.	"The Road Goes Ever On... (Part 2)" (feat. "In Dreams", performed by Edward Ross)	3:41
Total length:		63:01

=== Additional music ===
Additional music for the film was featured in The Rarities Archive release, attached to Doug Adams' book on the three film scores:

Track listing
No.	Title	Length
1.	"Prologue: One Ring to Rule Them All (Alternate)"	5:56
2.	"The Shire/The Hobbits (Mock-up)"	2:00
3.	"Out From Bree (Theatrical Version & Alternate)"	4:04
4.	"Flight to the Ford (Alternate)"	4:04
5.	"Moria (Mock-up)"	1:44
6.	"The Fighting Uruk-hai (Alternate)"	1:47
7.	"The Argonath (Alternate)"	2:18
Total length:		21:53

Along with about 20 minutes of alternate material from the original release, about 13 minutes of alternates in the fan credits, and some additional alternates, there are almost four hours of finalized music from Fellowship of the Ring.
