= The Lord of the Rings: The War of the Rohirrim (soundtrack) =

The Lord of the Rings: The War of the Rohirrim (Original Motion Picture Soundtrack)

Soundtrack album by Stephen Gallagher
- Released: December 6, 2024
- Recorded: February–August 2024
- Studio: Stella Maris Chapel, Wellington; Angel Recording Studios, London; Air-Edel Recording Studios, London
- Genre: Film score; soundtrack album
- Length: 129:47
- Label: WaterTower Music
- Producer: Mark Willsher; David Long

Stephen Gallagher chronology
Conquering Skin Cancer (2024)	The Lord of the Rings: The War of the Rohirrim (Original Motion Picture Soundtrack) (2024)	Secrets at Red Rocks (2025)

Singles from The Lord of the Rings: The War of the Rohirrim (Original Motion Picture Soundtrack)
- 1. "The Rider" Released: November 15, 2024

The Lord of the Rings: The War of the Rohirrim (Original Motion Picture Soundtrack) is the soundtrack album to the 2024 anime film The Lord of the Rings: The War of the Rohirrim directed by Kenji Kamiyama based on characters created by J. R. R. Tolkien from The Lord of the Rings fantasy novel series. The album featured original score composed by Stephen Gallagher and songs performed by Yazdan Qafouri, Paris Paloma, Lorraine Ashbourne and Ben O'Leary. An original song "The Rider" performed by Paloma was released as a single on November 15. The soundtrack album was released under the WaterTower Music label on December 6, 2024.

== Background ==
In February 2023, it was reported that New Zealand-based musician Stephen Gallagher would compose the score for The War of the Rohirrim. Gallagher, previously worked as a sound editor to Howard Shore who composed music for Peter Jackson's The Hobbit film trilogy and also on the latter's documentary The Beatles: Get Back (2021). Like Shore's music for the Lord of the Rings film trilogy, Gallagher continued the similar style while composing the score and further reprised Shore's Rohan theme from the original films. It was then premiered at the Annecy International Animation Film Festival on June 13, 2023.

== Recording and production ==
Recording for Gallagher's score began by March 2024 with the New Zealand-based Stroma ensemble, who provided wind and string instruments. Crumhorns and shawms were recorded at London's Air-Edel Recording Studios; and soloist Karen Bentley Pollick was recorded remotely in Mexico playing the Hardanger fiddle, which Shore prominently used for the music of Rohan in the films. Recording continued in May, including more sessions at Angel Studios and recording with the New Zealand-based Tudor Consort choral group. Recording in New Zealand, which also included harpist Michelle Velvin and singer Barbara Paterson, wrapped on August 20. After further sessions at Angel Studios and Air-Edel Studios that week, recording for the score finished on August 28. The sound mix took place at Park Road Post in Wellington and Gallagher completed his work on the film on October 3.

== Release ==
An original song created for the film, titled "The Rider", was announced in October 2024. Performed by Paris Paloma, the song was written by Gittins and composer David Long, who also provided additional music for Jackson's films. "The Rider" was released digitally by WaterTower Music on November 15 alongside an official music video. A soundtrack album featuring Gallagher's score along with "The Rider", along with three original songs—"Hama's Song" performed by Yazdan Qafouri and an Hearth Edit version by Ben O'Leary and "Lament for Helm" by Lorraine Ashbourne—were released on December 6, a week prior to the film's release. The album will be further issued in CDs and vinyl LPs by Mutant.

== Critical reception ==
Reviewing for Variety, Peter Debruge noted that Gallagher's "familiar choir-like score may well send chills down your spine". Pete Hammond of Deadline Hollywood wrote "Shout-out to Stephen Gallagher's stirring score. He was a music editor for Jackson's Hobbit films, and here gets the assignment just right, even bowing to original LOTR composer Howard Shore's memorable themes here and there." Zanobard Reviews rated 7.5 out of 10 and wrote "The iconic musical style and themes of Howard Shore's The Lord Of The Rings trilogy return in spectacular form for Stephen Gallagher's The War Of The Rohirrim – but while these are probably what will draw you to the score, what will make you stay is Gallagher's own material, with his heroically determined theme for Héra being the absolute star of this exquisitely orchestrated show."

Jeremy Mathai of /Film reviewed, "though the score never reaches the heights of Howard Shore's music, composer Stephen Gallagher crafts a solid themes for Hèra while weaving in cues from the originals." Clarisse Loughrey of The Independent opined that embellishes Shore's themes that results in an "unshakeable sense of familiarity". Steve Seigh of JoBlo.com wrote "Stephen Gallagher's score is as grand as expected. Gallagher combines delicate fantasy fare with booming orchestral overtures. The soundtrack effortlessly sets the mood for any invasion, scenery slow-pan, or fleeting moments of respite from the drama. I could envision OST heads adding the Rohirrim soundtrack to their collection immediately after the movie ends, relishing in new tunes from Middle-earth."

Jogai Bhatt, in his review for Radio New Zealand, stated "Composer Stephen Gallagher brings his A-game, composing a swelling and epic score on par with Howard Shore's, even reprising the Riders of Rohan theme as a nod to Lord of the Rings: The Two Towers." Maya Phillips of The New York Times mentioned that Gallagher's "unforgettable music [...] immediately sets this world within Jackson's universe."

== Track listing ==
No.	Title	Artist(s)	Length
1.	"Overture"		4:48
2.	"Hama's Song"	Yazdan Qafouri	0:43
3.	"Riders from the West March"		2:53
4.	"The Witan"		7:34
5.	"An Ill Omen"		2:50
6.	"The Beast Is Rabid"		7:15
7.	"Who Dares Occupy Isengard?"		4:30
8.	"Call the Men to Arms"		3:54
9.	"The Wisest Move"		4:24
10.	"The Line of Helm"		3:38
11.	"Arise, Arise Now"		4:26
12.	"Edoras Burns"		6:41
13.	"Call the Retreat"		7:27
14.	"Surround the Keep"		4:44
15.	"Pretty Words Will Not Save You"		4:01
16.	"A Wraith"		7:38
17.	"What Does Mordor Want with Rings?"		3:07
18.	"Helm Hammerhand Still Stands"		7:19
19.	"For Hope"		7:07
20.	"Out of Time"		2:35
21.	"One Small Chance"		2:18
22.	"A Shield-maiden of Rohan"		7:51
23.	"The Hornburg Will Fall"		6:00
24.	"Let Mercy Rule This Day"		1:45
25.	"The Tenth King of Rohan"		1:12
26.	"Adventure Beckons"		2:48
27.	"The Rider"	Paris Paloma	3:53
28.	"Secret Tunnels"		3:22
29.	"Lament for Helm"	Lorraine Ashbourne	0:54
30.	"Hama's Song" (Hearth Edit)	Ben O'Leary	2:10
Total length:			129:47

== Release history ==
Release history and formats for The Lord of the Rings: The War of the Rohirrim (Original Motion Picture Soundtrack)
Region	Date	Format(s)	Label(s)	Ref.
Various	December 6, 2024	Digital download; streaming	WaterTower Music	
Various	March 7, 2025	CD; LP	Mutant	
