= The Music of the Lord of the Rings Films =

Non-fiction book

The Music of The Lord of the Rings Films
- Cover of the first edition
- Author: Doug Adams
- Illustrator: John Howe, Alan Lee
- Language: English
- Subject: Film music
- Genre: Musicology
- Publisher: Carpentier
- Publication date: 2010
- Pages: 401 + CD
- ISBN: 978-0-7390-7157-1

The Music of the Lord of the Rings Films is a 2010 book by the musicologist Doug Adams, describing and analysing the composer Howard Shore's score for Peter Jackson's The Lord of the Rings film series. The book was well received by critics who admired both the book's production and the clarity of Adams's text, which succeeded in being technically accurate and accessible to readers. The text is accompanied by musical notation, monochrome drawings by the films' concept illustrators John Howe and Alan Lee, and stills from the films.

== Background ==
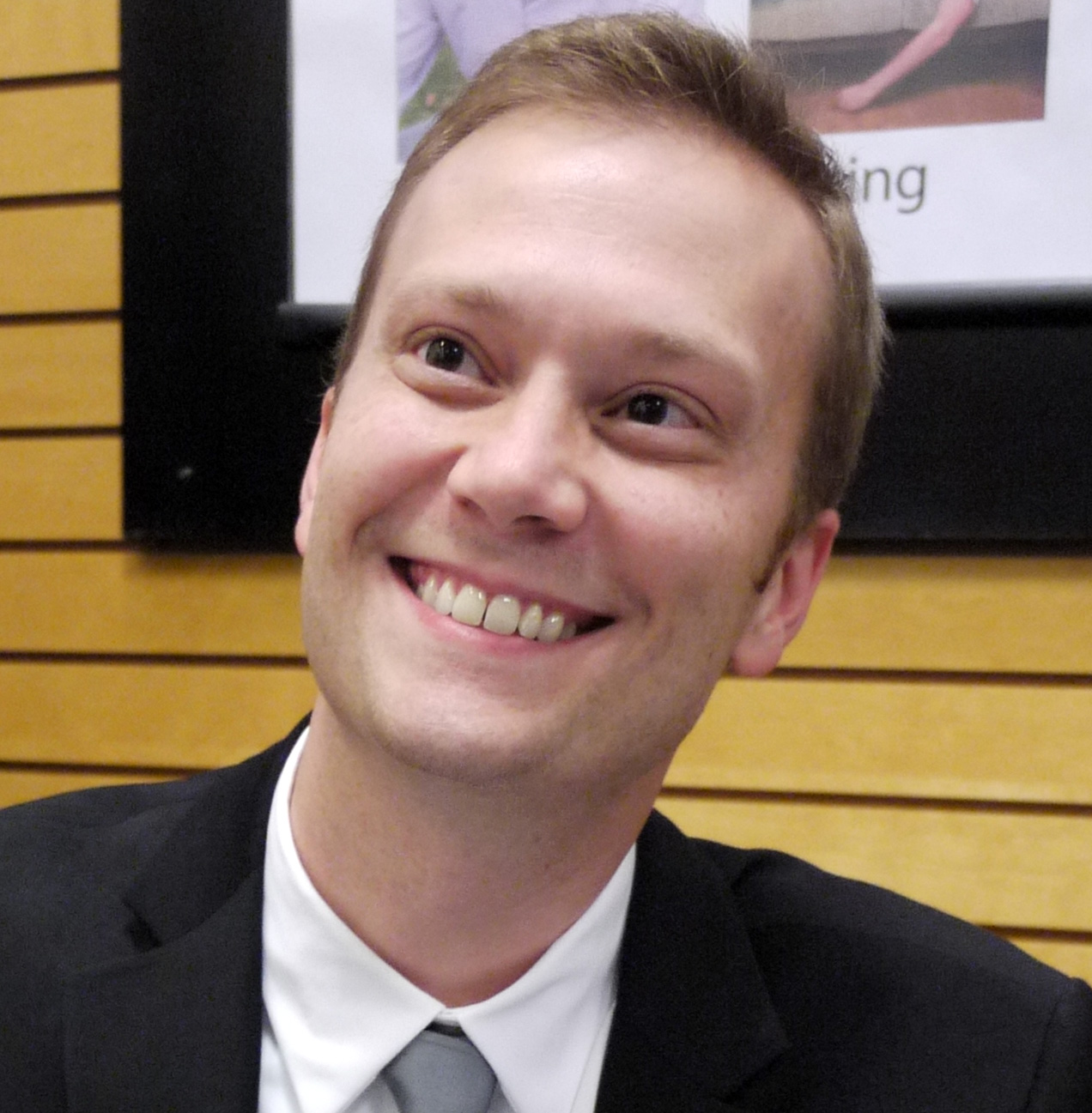
The musicologist Doug Adams enjoyed unique long-term access to Shore during the composition period to document and analyse the film scores.

In 2010, the musicologist Doug Adams published what is effectively the official book of Howard Shore's scores for the films, The Music of the Lord of the Rings Films, as Shore had invited him to "organize and present a cohesive view of the score". The book is based on unique long-term access to Shore throughout the four-year composition period. Shore describes the book as "a wonderfully readable version of what I created in music". He states that Adams became a friend, and "from all of his detailed study, [is] much more an expert in this music than I am!" The films' writer and producer, Fran Walsh, writes in the foreword that "Howard's music ... gave the cultures of the Elves and the Dwarves and the kingdoms of Men a powerful authenticity", and that "I feel enormously proud that [Shore's] beautiful work, beloved by so many around the world, has been so eloquently celebrated by Doug Adams in this fine book."

== Book ==
=== Synopsis ===
Each theme is set out with its name, such as "Éowyn Shieldmaiden of the Rohirrim", with the name of the scene where it is first heard (here, "Edoras"), musical notation of the theme, a short text relating the musical composition to the scene, and often a monochrome illustration (here, a drawing of Éowyn). The interweaving of text and graphics has been praised for making the score accessible.

The Music of the Lord of the Rings Films sets out to provide full coverage of Howard Shore's scores for Peter Jackson's The Lord of the Rings film series. There is a foreword by Shore, an introduction by Fran Walsh, and a prologue by Adams.

Adams's account of the score's recurring themes or leitmotifs, some 100 of them, occupies nearly half the book; they are arranged in order of appearance. Each theme is documented with its name, a brief text, musical notation, and often a drawing. Complex cases like "The One Ring" are presented as a group of themes (four in its case) with a short overview.

The second half of the book is an annotated score. It describes the structure of the score, which matches the scene structure of the films. For example, "Bag End" describes the scene where Frodo is seen reading under a tree, and a peaceful whistling tune plays. Gandalf appears in a cart. The "Hobbit Outline" plays. The hobbit and the wizard embrace, with a spoken narrative and the "Rural Setting" theme. Inside Bag End, Bilbo panics that he has lost the One Ring; the "Hobbit Skip-Beat" plays, and so on.

When there is a text, it is given in full in the annotated score. When the original text has been translated for the score, both the original and the translation are given; for example, for "The King", the original is in the English of Philippa Boyens, while the Old English translation is by David Salo.

Other lyrics are in Tolkien's constructed languages of Elvish (Quenya and Sindarin), Mannish (Adûnaic), Dwarvish (Khuzdul) and the Black Speech of Sauron.

The book ends with an account of the recording sessions, and an epilogue.

=== Publication history ===
The book was published by Éditions Didier Carpentier in hardback in 2010. Two appendices detail the performers and the musical instruments used. A thematic index is provided. The book is illustrated with musical notation for each theme (leitmotif), and with monochrome drawings by the films' concept artists, the illustrators John Howe and Alan Lee. There is a monochrome photographic portrait of Shore, and colour stills from the films. A CD, The Lord of the Rings Rarities Archive of unreleased versions of some of the themes, is taped inside the rear cover.

== Reception ==
Bethany Waugh, reviewing The Music of the Lord of the Rings Films for the Mythopoeic Society, praises it as "everything it claims to be. It is a comprehensive account of Howard Shore's scores, made accessible to the world", and "very skillfully written". Waugh admires the interweaving of text and illustrations, "which make reading this book a pleasure." She finds the end-of-book details of the recording sessions fascinating, and enjoys the rarities archive CD. Summing up, she writes that the book is "a masterpiece of [Adams's] own, both scholarly and entertaining".

Vincent Rone, for Music and the Moving Image, noted that the rarities archive CD contains Adams's interview with Shore in two tracks that Rone calls "real gems", giving insight into how Shore composes: Shore states that he is trying to build "a mirror image of Tolkien's writing", reading about a place in Middle-earth and composing a piece that "would bring it to life in musical terms".

TheOneRing.net commented in 2011 that the book was "the best of LOTR movie-related book[s] and worth the wait" since the films appeared. It called the book a "must-own for fans" of the films, describing it as "beautifully arranged". It commented that the text neither talks down to readers nor goes over their heads. In its view, Adams "sets a standard for film books, fan-friendly publications and music scoring aficionados all at once."

Emily McClanathan, in Chicago Reader, describes the volume as beautifully illustrated, with each theme described in detail, a narrative analysis of the scores of the three films, and translations of the sung texts, along with background on the process of composition. In her view, "perhaps the most impressive element is the way Adams balances accessibility with in-depth analysis, appealing to readers with or without prior musical knowledge."

== Sources ==
- Adams, Doug (2010). The Music of The Lord of the Rings Films. Éditions Didier Carpentier. ISBN 978-0-7390-7157-1.
