= May It Be =

2001 single by Enya

Single by Enya

from the album The Lord of the Rings: The Fellowship of the Ring
- Language: English, Quenya
- B-side: "Isobella"; "The First of Autumn"
- Released: 10 December 2001
- Studio: Aigle (Dublin, Ireland)
- Genre: New-age
- Length: 4:19 (album version); 3:31 (single/radio edit)
- Label: WEA
- Songwriters: Enya; Roma Ryan
- Producer: Nicky Ryan

Enya singles chronology
"Wild Child" (2001)	"May It Be" (2001)	"I Don't Wanna Know" (2004)

Lyric video
- "May It Be" on YouTube

"May It Be" is a song by the Irish recording artist Enya. She and Roma Ryan respectively composed and wrote lyrics to the song, for Peter Jackson's 2001 film The Lord of the Rings: The Fellowship of the Ring. The song entered the German Singles Chart at number one in 2002, and Enya performed it at the 74th Academy Awards. "May It Be" was acclaimed by music critics and received nominations for the Academy Award for Best Original Song, the Golden Globe Award for Best Original Song, and the Grammy Award for Best Song Written for Visual Media.

== Composition ==
Director Peter Jackson approached Enya (under the suggestion of Howard Shore), asking if she would be interested in writing a song for The Lord of the Rings. Thrilled at the prospect, Enya headed to New Zealand to see the preliminary edits of the film. Enya worked on the song with Nicky Ryan, her producer, and Roma Ryan, her lyricist. Nicky produced Enya's vocals and arranged the music while Roma wrote the lyrics. They recorded the song through Enya's contract with Warner Music at Aigle Studio, the Ryans' and Enya's own recording studio.

The vocals were recorded at Aigle Studio in Dublin, and the orchestration was recorded in London, directed by Howard Shore and performed by the London Voices and London Philharmonic Orchestra. Compositionally, the piece is simple, featuring a backdrop of choir and strings. As Doug Adams commented, Enya's contributions "coexist so neatly", with Shore's score, that "neither Enya song is relegated to its own track".

"I wanted Enya's voice," says Shore. "She wrote and I orchestrated, so it's a seamless sound. Her singing grows right out of the choral music and the orchestra." – Doug Adams, The Fellowship of the Ring: The Complete Recordings

== Lyrics ==
The lyrics of this theme song include English words, as well as words in the fictional Elvish language, Quenya, created by J.R.R. Tolkien. While Enya wrote music, Roma Ryan studied the languages and wrote the lyrics in English and Quenya. They are intermingled with the English lyrics; "Mornië utúlië, believe and you will find your way; Mornië alantië, a promise lives within you now." Mornië utúlië, translates to "Darkness has come". Mornië alantië translates as "Darkness has fallen".

== Critical reception and awards ==
"May It Be" was nominated for the 2002 Academy Award for Best Original Song, but lost to Randy Newman's "If I Didn't Have You" from Monsters, Inc., sung by John Goodman and Billy Crystal. It won the Las Vegas Film Critics Society Award for Best Song and the 2002 Critics' Choice Movie Award for Best Song. It was nominated for the 2002 Golden Globe Award for Best Original Song, but lost to "Until" from Kate & Leopold. The song received a 2003 Grammy Award nomination for Best Song Written for Visual Media.

Enya performed her song at the Academy Awards on 24 March 2002. She was "absolutely" excited about the performance. For her it was the "first time to be nominated, and to get to perform, it's just wonderful, absolutely wonderful."

== Release ==
Enya's "May It Be" has been included on various albums. On 20 November 2001, it was released on The Lord of the Rings: The Fellowship of the Ring soundtrack, along with composer Howard Shore's original score "The Road Goes Ever On (Part 2)". It also came out as a single in Europe on 10 December 2001 and in the United Kingdom on 21 January 2002. "May It Be" entered the German Singles Chart at number one. It was Enya's second consecutive single to do so, following her song "Only Time". In 2005, it was released as part of the compilation The Lord of the Rings: The Fellowship of the Ring: The Complete Recordings. This time, the version of the song was identical as featured in the movie's ending titles. Enya also included the song on her 2009 album, The Very Best of Enya.

== Music video ==
The music video was directed by Peter Nydrle. It features clips from the film as well as Enya singing the song. The video runs for 3 minutes and 32 seconds.

== Track listings ==
European CD single and UK cassette single

1. "May It Be" – 3:30
2. "Isobella" – 4:27

European maxi-CD single and UK CD single

1. "May It Be" – 3:30
2. "Isobella" – 4:27
3. "The First of Autumn" – 3:08

== Charts ==
=== Weekly charts ===
Weekly chart performance for "May It Be"
Chart (2001–2003)	Peak position
Austria (Ö3 Austria Top 40)	12
Belgium (Ultratop 50 Flanders)	47
Belgium (Ultratip Bubbling Under Wallonia)	4
Canada (Nielsen SoundScan)	62
Denmark (Tracklisten)	19
Czech Republic (IFPI)	7
Europe (Eurochart Hot 100)	10
Finland (Suomen virallinen lista)	7
France (SNEP)	43
Germany (GfK)	1
Greece (IFPI Greece)	42
Hungary (Single Top 40)	9
Ireland (IRMA)	30
Italy (FIMI)	12
Netherlands (Single Top 100)	60
Romania (Romanian Top 100)	72
Scotland Singles (Official Charts)	60
Sweden (Sverigetopplistan)	16
Switzerland (Schweizer Hitparade)	24
UK Singles (Official Charts)	50

=== Year-end charts ===
Year-end chart performance for "May It Be"
Chart (2002)	Position
Austria (Ö3 Austria Top 40)	63
Europe (Eurochart Hot 100)	86
Germany (Media Control)	37

== Certifications ==
Certifications and sales for "May It Be"
Region	Certification	Certified units/sales
Spain (Promusicae)	Gold	30,000^{‡}
United Kingdom (BPI)	Silver	200,000^{‡}
^{‡} Sales+streaming figures based on certification alone.

== Release history ==
Release dates and formats for "May It Be"
Region	Date	Format(s)	Label(s)	Ref.
Europe	10 December 2001	CD	WEA	
United Kingdom	21 January 2002	CD	WEA	
