= Doug Adams (music journalist) =

American musician

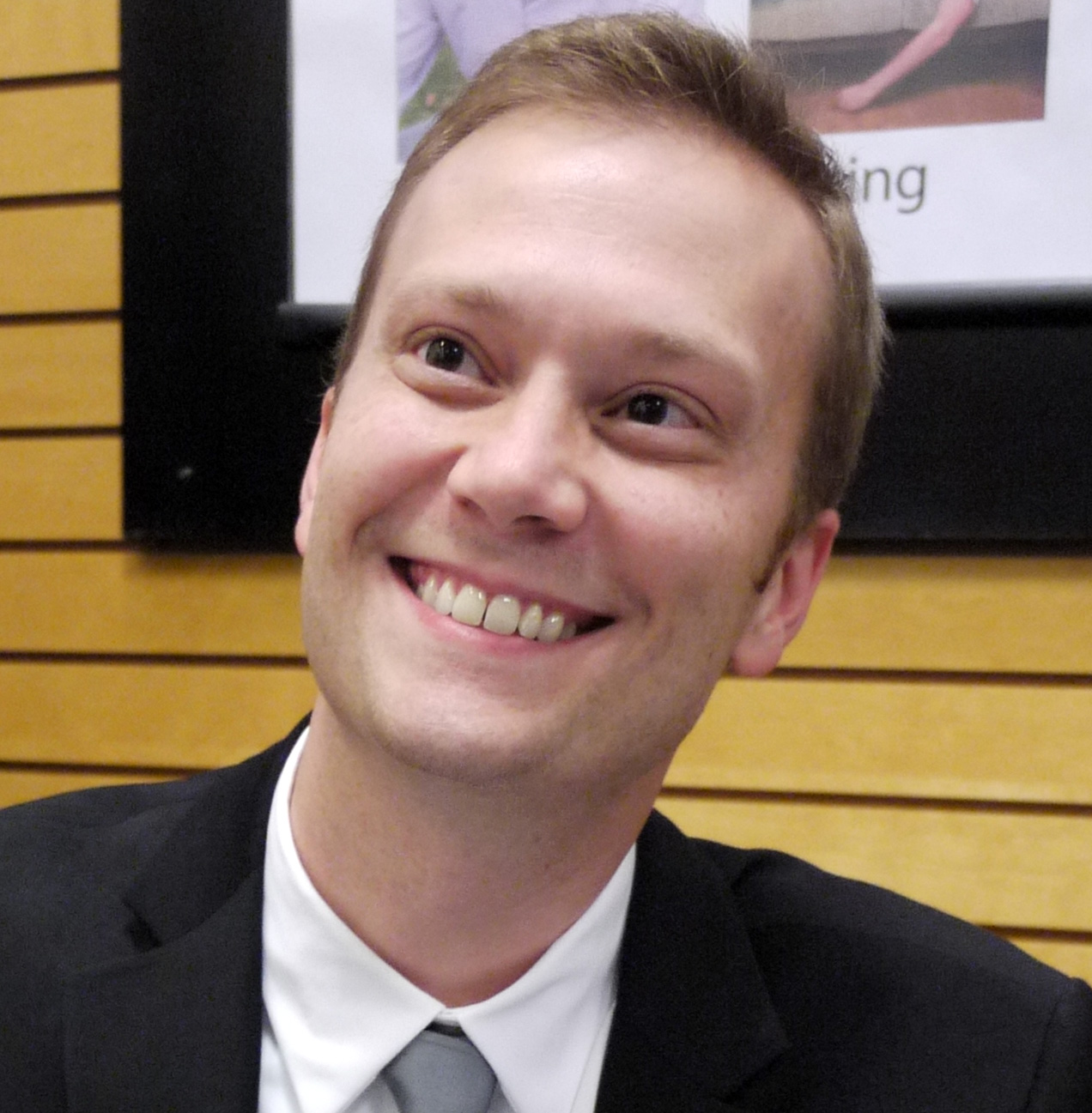
- Adams at a book-signing in 2010
- Occupations: Musicologist, author

Doug Adams is a musician, author, lecturer, and educator. He is the author of The Music of the Lord of the Rings Films, a book about the music in The Lord of the Rings films.

== Career ==
Adams previously worked for Film Score Monthly where, among other articles, he wrote extensive analyses of the themes used in John Williams' Star Wars film scores.

After graduate school in 2001, Adams was selected by Howard Shore to observe and document his work on The Lord of the Rings films. Adams spent just under ten years writing the book, The Music of the Lord of the Rings Films. He also wrote the booklets and liner notes packaged with the extended versions of The Lord of the Rings scores. Adams also works at Hickory Creek Middle School in Frankfort, Illinois as a band director.

Adams' association with Howard Shore continued in 2011, during which time he acted as an advisor to Shore's The Lord of the Rings in Concert series and produced a recording of an orchestrion for the film Hugo.

In late 2013, he was seen in two documentaries: The Songs of the Hobbit (which was included with the extended edition of The Hobbit: An Unexpected Journey) and The Hobbit: The Desolation of Smaug, Production Video 14. In 2014, he appeared in The Music of the Hobbit, an hour-long documentary that was included on the extended edition of The Hobbit: The Desolation of Smaug. In the video, Adams discussed Howard Shore's music and demonstrated themes at the keyboard. He also authored the liner notes that accompanied the three albums of the Hobbit film scores.

It was announced on The Modern Musician podcast that Adams has written a book titled Impossible Silence, which covers silent films and the history of film music.

Adams is listed as a participant in the Star Wars documentary The Prequels Strike Back: A Fan's Journey, in which he "sits down with his piano to highlight some of the masterful ways John Williams makes parallels between the original and prequel trilogy."

On November 25, 2016, Howard Shore confirmed that Adams was working on a book that will cover the music of The Hobbit films. It was set to be released in 2017, but it has not been published as of 2025.

== Personal life ==
Adams and his wife live in Frankfort. He is a percussionist.

== Bibliography ==
- The Music of The Lord of the Rings Films (2010).
