= Only Time: The Collection =

- Digital edition cover

Box set by Enya
- Released: 5 November 2002
- Recorded: 1985–2001
- Genre: New-age; Celtic
- Length: 2:57:58
- Label: WEA (Europe); Reprise (US)
- Producer: Nicky Ryan

Enya chronology
Themes from Calmi Cuori Appassionati (2001)	Only Time: The Collection (2002)	Amarantine (2005)

Only Time: The Collection is a box set by Irish singer-songwriter and musician Enya, released on 5 November 2002 in the United States and on 2 December 2002 in Europe. The set contains 51 tracks across four discs that spans her 1987 debut album Enya through her 2002 single "May It Be". A 48-page booklet with liner notes and lyrics by her longtime lyricist Roma Ryan is included. The video of "Oíche Chiúin (Silent Night)" is also included on the fourth disc, the performance comes from the BBC programme Christmas Day in the Morning aired on 25 December 1996 and was recorded at Christ Church Cathedral in Dublin. In addition to this computer playable video, there is also a screensaver in the cover art motif and a slideshow of pictures from the booklet. This release was a limited worldwide release of 200,000, with US sales of over 60,000 copies. The selection of songs was made by Enya, Nicky and Roma.

== Track listing ==
=== Disc one ===
No.	Title	Original album	Length
1.	"Watermark"	Watermark	2:24
2.	"Exile"	Watermark	4:20
3.	"Aldebaran"	Enya	3:05
4.	"March of the Celts"	Enya	3:15
5.	"Boadicea"	Enya	3:28
6.	"The Sun in the Stream"	Enya	2:54
7.	"On Your Shore"	Watermark	3:59
8.	"Cursum Perficio"	Watermark	4:06
9.	"Storms in Africa" (original Irish version)	Watermark	4:03
10.	"The Celts"	Enya	2:56
11.	"Miss Clare Remembers"	Watermark	1:59
12.	"I Want Tomorrow"	Enya	4:00
Total length:			40:29

=== Disc two ===
No.	Title	Original album	Length
1.	"Orinoco Flow"	Watermark	4:25
2.	"Ebudæ"	Shepherd Moons	1:53
3.	"River"	Watermark	3:10
4.	"The Longships"	Watermark	3:36
5.	"Na Laetha Geal M'óige"	Watermark	3:54
6.	"Book of Days" (English/Irish lyric)	Shepherd Moons	2:55
7.	"Shepherd Moons"	Shepherd Moons	3:42
8.	"Caribbean Blue"	Shepherd Moons	3:56
9.	"Evacuee"	Shepherd Moons	3:49
10.	"Evening Falls..."	Watermark	3:46
11.	"Lothlórien"	Shepherd Moons	2:06
12.	"Marble Halls"	Shepherd Moons	3:51
Total length:			41:03

=== Disc three ===
No.	Title	Original album	Length
1.	"Afer Ventus^{[a]}"	Shepherd Moons	4:06
2.	"No Holly for Miss Quinn"	Shepherd Moons	2:40
3.	"The Memory of Trees"	The Memory of Trees	4:18
4.	"Anywhere Is"	The Memory of Trees	3:58
5.	"Athair Ar Neamh"	The Memory of Trees	3:39
6.	"China Roses"	The Memory of Trees	4:47
7.	"How Can I Keep from Singing?"	Shepherd Moons	4:22
8.	"Hope Has a Place"	The Memory of Trees	4:44
9.	"Tea-House Moon"	The Memory of Trees	2:41
10.	"Pax Deorum"	The Memory of Trees	4:58
11.	"Eclipse"	A Box of Dreams	1:33
12.	"Isobella"	A Day Without Rain	4:27
Total length:			46:13

=== Disc four ===
No.	Title	Original album	Length
1.	"Only Time"	A Day Without Rain	3:38
2.	"A Day Without Rain"	A Day Without Rain	2:38
3.	"Song of the Sandman (Lullaby)"	Themes from Calmi Cuori Appassionati	3:40
4.	"Willows on the Water"	A Box of Dreams	3:00
5.	"Wild Child"	A Day Without Rain	3:47
6.	"Flora's Secret"	A Day Without Rain	4:05
7.	"Fallen Embers"	A Day Without Rain	2:29
8.	"Tempus Vernum"	A Day Without Rain	2:24
9.	"Deora Ar Mo Chroí"	A Day Without Rain	2:48
10.	"One by One"	A Day Without Rain	3:53
11.	"The First of Autumn"	A Day Without Rain	3:08
12.	"Lazy Days"	A Day Without Rain	3:43
13.	"May It Be" (single version)	The Lord of the Rings: The Fellowship of the Ring	3:30
14.	"Oíche Chiúin (Silent Night)"	6 Tracks / The Christmas EP	3:45
15.	"Oíche Chiúin (Silent Night)" (video^{[b]})		3:45
Total length:			50:13

Notes

- ^{^[a]} Misspelled as "After Ventus" in track listings
- ^{^[b]} Courtesy of BBC Television

== Personnel ==
Credits are adapted from the album's 2002 liner notes.

Musicians

- Enya – vocals, instrumentation
- Chris Hughes – African Hand Drums on "Storms in Africa"
- Nicky Ryan – Handclaps on "Storms in Africa"

Production

- Enya – arranging, mixing, composer
- Nicky Ryan – arranging, engineering, mixing, producer
- Ross Cullum – engineering, mixing
- Roma Ryan – lyrics except "Marble Halls" (Traditional), "How Can I Keep from Singing?" (Traditional) and "Oíche Chiúin (Silent Night)" (Traditional)
- Dick Beetham – mastering at Mastering 360, London
- Design and Art Direction by Stylorouge
- Photography by Simon Fowler at Syon House Middlesex
- Styling by Michele Clapton
- Hair and make-up by Aran Guest

== Charts ==
=== Weekly charts ===
Weekly chart performance for Only Time: The Collection
Chart (2003)	Peak position
Dutch Albums (Dutch Album Top 100)	37
German Albums (Offizielle Top 100)	93

== Release history ==
Release dates and formats for Only Time: The Collection
Region	Date	Format	Label	Ref.
United States	5 November 2002	CD	Reprise	
Europe	2 December 2002	CD	WEA	
