= A Box of Dreams =

Box set by Enya
- Released: 1 December 1997
- Length: 2:40:24
- Label: WEA
- Producer: Nicky Ryan

Enya chronology
Paint the Sky with Stars – The Best of Enya (1997)	A Box of Dreams (1997)	A Day Without Rain (2000)

A Box of Dreams is a limited edition 3-disc box set by Irish singer-songwriter Enya, initially released on 1 December 1997 by WEA Records. The set was a companion release to her first compilation album Paint the Sky with Stars – The Best of Enya, released the previous month. A Box of Dreams contains 46 tracks from her 1987 debut album Enya to Paint the Sky with Stars across three discs, each thematically arranged: "Oceans" contains Enya's upbeat tracks, "Clouds" is a collection of her piano instrumentals, and "Stars" contains slow ballads and more atmospheric tracks. Four B-sides are included: "Oriel Window", "Morning Glory", "Willows on the Water" and "Eclipse". The calligraphy and design were done by Brody Neuenschwander.

The vinyl edition of A Box of Dreams was released on 23rd June 2023 with new liner notes penned by Roma Ryan.

== Track listing ==
=== Disc one: Oceans ===
No.	Title	Album	Length
1.	"Orinoco Flow"	Watermark	4:26
2.	"Caribbean Blue"	Shepherd Moons	3:58
3.	"Book of Days"	Shepherd Moons	2:57
4.	"Anywhere Is"	The Memory of Trees	3:46
5.	"Only If..."	Paint the Sky with Stars	3:20
6.	"The Celts"	Enya/The Celts	2:57
7.	"Cursum Perficio"	Watermark	4:05
8.	"I Want Tomorrow"	Enya/The Celts	4:02
9.	"China Roses"	The Memory of Trees	4:38
10.	"Storms in Africa"	Watermark	4:12
11.	"Pax Deorum"	The Memory of Trees	5:00
12.	"The Longships"	Watermark	3:34
13.	"Ebudæ"	Shepherd Moons	1:52
14.	"On My Way Home"	The Memory of Trees	3:38
15.	"Boadicea"	Enya/The Celts	3:32

=== Disc two: Clouds ===
No.	Title	Album	Length
1.	"Watermark"	Watermark	2:29
2.	"Portrait (Out of the Blue)"	Enya/The Celts	3:15
3.	"Miss Clare Remembers"	Watermark	1:57
4.	"Shepherd Moons"	Shepherd Moons	3:41
5.	"March of the Celts"	Enya/The Celts	3:20
6.	"Lothlórien"	Shepherd Moons	2:09
7.	"From Where I Am"	The Memory of Trees	2:25
8.	"Afer Ventus"	Shepherd Moons	4:09
9.	"Oriel Window"	Non-LP track, B-side of "Caribbean Blue" (U.K.), "Book of Days" (Japan) and "Anywhere Is"	2:24
10.	"River"	Watermark	3:11
11.	"Tea-House Moon"	The Memory of Trees	2:45
12.	"Willows on the Water"	Non-LP track, b-side of "Only If..."	3:03
13.	"Morning Glory"	Non-LP track, b-side of "Evening Falls..."	2:30
14.	"No Holly for Miss Quinn"	Shepherd Moons	2:45
15.	"The Memory of Trees"	The Memory of Trees	4:18

=== Disc three: Stars ===
No.	Title	Album	Length
1.	"Evening Falls..."	Watermark	3:48
2.	"Paint the Sky with Stars"	Paint the Sky with Stars	4:18
3.	"Angeles"	Shepherd Moons	4:03
4.	"Athair Ar Neamh"	The Memory of Trees	3:44
5.	"La Soñadora"	The Memory of Trees	3:40
6.	"Aldebaran"	Enya/The Celts	3:08
7.	"Deireadh an Tuath"	Enya/The Celts	1:46
8.	"Eclipse"	Non-LP track, b-side of "The Celts" and "On My Way Home"	1:34
9.	"Exile"	Watermark	4:20
10.	"On Your Shore"	Watermark	3:59
11.	"Evacuee"	Shepherd Moons	3:52
12.	"Marble Halls"	Shepherd Moons	3:57
13.	"Hope Has a Place"	The Memory of Trees	4:51
14.	"The Sun in the Stream"	Enya/The Celts	2:58
15.	"Na Laetha Geal M'óige"	Watermark	3:59
16.	"Smaointe..."	Shepherd Moons	6:08

== Release history ==
Release dates and formats for A Box of Dreams
Region	Date	Format	Version	Label
Various	1 December 1997	CD; cassette	Complete	WEA
Various	28 August 2020	Digital download; streaming	Oceans	Warner Music
Various	18 September 2020	Digital download; streaming	Clouds	Warner Music
Various	23 October 2020	Digital download; streaming	Stars	Warner Music
Various	23 June 2023	Vinyl	Complete (6 discs)	Warner Music

== Personnel ==
- Music composed by Enya
- Lyrics by Roma Ryan
- Produced by Nicky Ryan

== Charts ==
Chart (1997)	Peak position
Australian Albums (ARIA)	199
