= List of awards and nominations received by Enya =

Enya awards and nominations
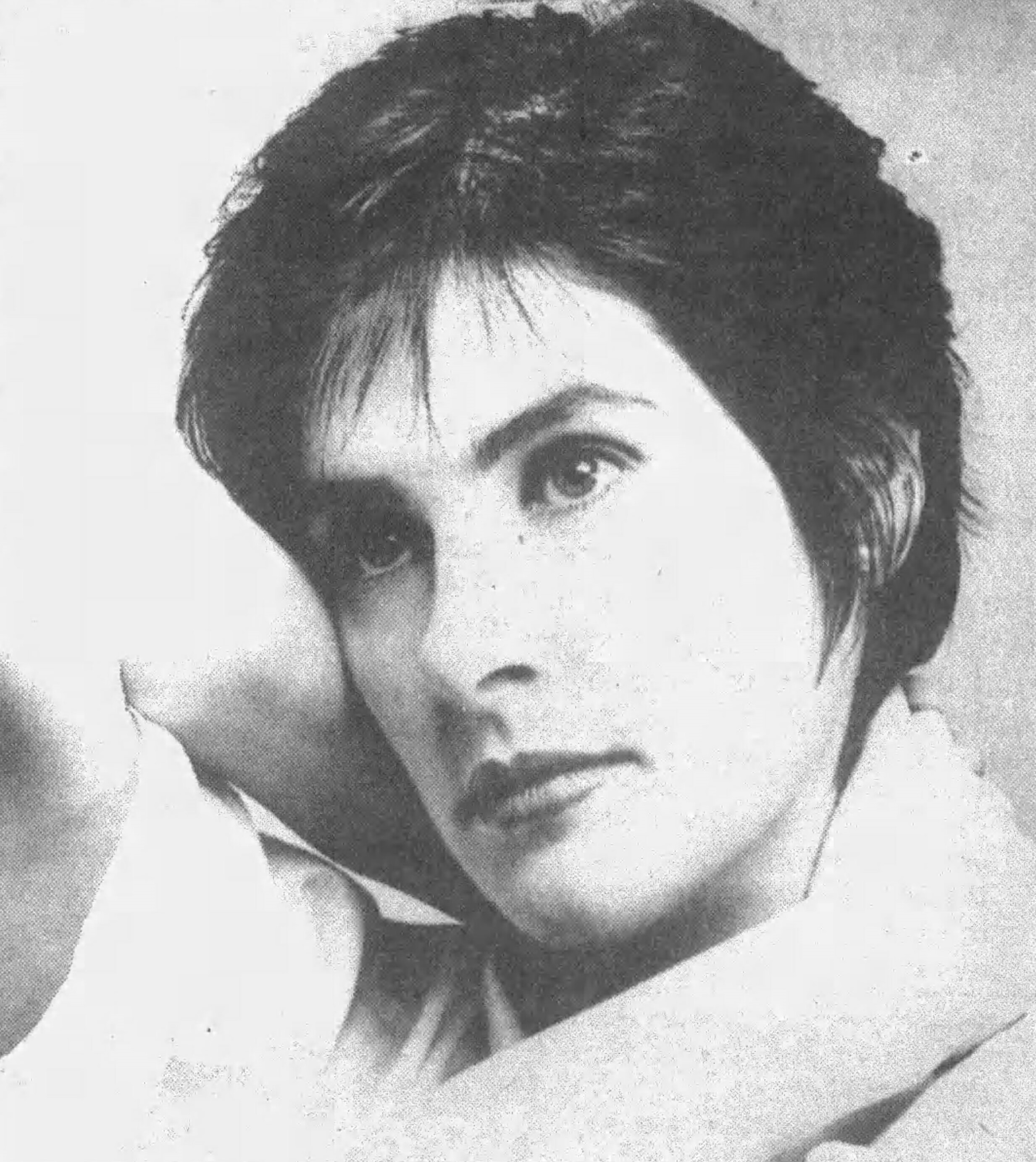
- Enya in 1989
Awards and nominations
Award	Wins	Nominations
Academy Awards	0	1
American Music Awards	0	1
Billboard Music Awards	0	1
BRIT Awards	0	4
ECHO Music Prize	1	5
Golden Globes	0	1
Grammy Awards	4	9
Japan Gold Disc Awards	2	2
World Music Awards	5	5

Totals (Note: Certain award groups do not simply award one winner. They acknowledge several different recipients, have runners-up, and have third place. Since this is a specific recognition and is different from losing an award, runner-up mentions are considered wins in this award tally. For simplification and to avoid errors, each award in this list has been presumed to have had a prior nomination.)
- Wins: 38
- Nominations: 73

Irish singer and composer Enya has received various accolades in recognition of her music, primarily in the Celtic and new-age subcategories. Enya's career spans over four decades, beginning her solo career in 1982. She is the best-selling solo Irish artist—second artist only behind U2— and one of the best-selling artists of all time.

"May It Be" from the 2001 film The Lord of the Rings: The Fellowship of the Ring garnered her nominations at major ceremonies, including the Academy Awards and Golden Globe Awards for Best Original Song, in 2002. Enya had won all of her nominated World Music Awards, four Grammy Awards of nine nominations, and became the most nominated Irish artist in history at the Brit Awards. In 2007, Enya was honored by Ulster University with an honorary Doctor of Letters degree and by University of Galway with an honorary Doctor of Music degree. Watermark won twice the RTÉ Choice Music Prize for Classic Irish Album in 2024 and 2025, respectively.

== Awards and nominations ==
Award/organization (Note: Charts are not included, unless they are explicitly described as "awards" or specific trophies are given.)	Year	Nominee/work	Category	Result	Ref.
Academy Awards	2002	"May It Be"	Best Original Song	Nominated	
Academy of Achievement	2002	Enya	Golden Plate Award	Won	
American Music Awards	2002	Enya	Favorite Adult Contemporary	Nominated	
BDSCertified Spin Awards	2002	"Only Time"	300,000 Spins	Won	
Billboard Music Awards	2001	Enya	Female Albums Artist of the Year	Nominated	
Billboard Number-One Awards	1989	Watermark	Top Pop Album	Nominated	
Billboard Number-One Awards	1989	Watermark	Top Pop Compact Disk	Nominated	
Billboard Number-One Awards	1989	Watermark	Top New Age Album	Nominated	
Billboard Number-One Awards	1989	Enya	Top Pop Album Artists — Female	Nominated	
Billboard Number-One Awards	1989	Enya	Top New Age Artist	Nominated	
BMI London Awards	2005	"I Don't Wanna Know"	Pop Winning Songs	Won	
BMI London Awards	2005	"I Don't Wanna Know"	Urban Winning Songs	Won	
BMI London Awards	2024	"Creepin'"	Song of the Year (Songwriting honoree)	Won	
BMI Pop Awards	1989	"Orinoco Flow"	Most-Performed Songs	Won	
BMI Pop Awards	2003	"Only Time"	Song List	Won	
BMI Pop Awards	2005	"I Don't Wanna Know" (Mario Winans featuring Enya and P. Diddy)	Most-Performed Songs	Won	
BRIT Awards	1989	Enya	Best International Female Solo Artist	Nominated	
BRIT Awards	1989	Enya	Best International Breakthrough Act	Nominated	
BRIT Awards	1992	Enya	Best International Solo Artist	Nominated	
BRIT Awards	1993	Enya	Best International Solo Artist	Nominated	
Broadcast Film Critics	2005	"May It Be"	Best Song	Won	
Cash Box Awards	1989	Enya	Top New Female Artist — Pop Albums	Nominated	
Cash Box Year-End Awards	1992	Enya	Top Female Artist	Nominated	
Cash Box Year-End Awards	1992	Shepherd Moons	Top Pop Album	Nominated	
Critics Choice Association	2002	"May It Be"	Best Original Song	Won	
ECHO Music Prize	1997	Enya	Best International Female Artist	Nominated	
ECHO Music Prize	2002	"Only Time"	Best International Pop Song	Won	
ECHO Music Prize	2002	Enya	Best International Female Artist	Nominated	
ECHO Music Prize	2006	Enya	Best International Female Artist	Nominated	
ECHO Music Prize	2016	Enya	Best International Female Artist	Nominated	
Golden Globes Awards	2002	"May It Be"	Best Original Song	Nominated	
Golden Raspberry Awards	1993	"Book of Days"	Worst Original Song	Nominated	
Grammy Awards	1990	"Orinoco Flow"	Best Music Video	Nominated	
Grammy Awards	1990	"Orinoco Flow"	Best New Age Performance	Nominated	
Grammy Awards	1993	Shepherd Moons	Best New Age Album	Won	
Grammy Awards	1997	The Memory of Trees	Best New Age Album	Won	
Grammy Awards	2002	A Day Without Rain	Best New Age Album	Won	
Grammy Awards	2003	"May It Be"	Best Song Written for Visual Media	Nominated	
Grammy Awards	2007	Amarantine	Best New Age Album	Won	
Grammy Awards	2007	"Drifting"	Best Pop Instrumental Performance	Nominated	
Grammy Awards	2017	Dark Sky Island	Best New Age Album	Nominated	
Hong Kong Top Sales Music Awards	2001	A Day Without Rain	Top Ten Best Selling Foreign Albums of the Year	Won	
Irish Music Awards	2011	Enya	Tommy Makem Award	Won	
Irish Recorded Music Awards (IRMA)	1989	Enya	Best Irish Female Artist	Won	
Irish Recorded Music Awards (IRMA)	1993	Enya	Best Irish Female Artist	Won	
Ivor Novello Awards	1998	Enya	International Achievement	Won	
Japan Gold Disc Awards	1997	Paint the Sky with Stars	Best International Pop Album	Won	
Japan Gold Disc Awards	2001	A Day Without Rain	Best International Pop Album	Won	
Los 40 Pop Awards	1992	Enya	Best New Age Artist	Nominated	
Meteor Ireland Music Awards	2009	Enya	Best Irish Female	Nominated	
MOBO Awards	2004	"I Don't Wanna Know" (Mario Winans featuring Enya and P. Diddy)	Best Ringtone	Won	
MOBO Awards	2004	"I Don't Wanna Know" (Mario Winans featuring Enya and P. Diddy)	Best Single	Nominated	
Music & Media Year-End Awards	1992	Enya	Top 3 Female Artists — Albums	Won	
Music & Media Year-End Awards	1996	Enya	Top Album Artists	Nominated	
Napster Awards	2006	Enya	Most-Played World Artist — USA	Won	
Napster Awards	2006	"Only Time"	Most-Played World Song — USA	Won	
NARM Awards	1993	Shepherd Moons	Top-Selling New Age Recording	Won	
RTÉ Choice Music Prize	2024	Watermark	Classic Irish Album	Won	
University of Galway	2007	Enya	Honorary Doctor of Music (PhD) degree	Honoree	
Ulster University	2007	Enya	Honorary Doctor of Letters (DLitt) degree	Honoree	
World Music Awards	2001	Enya	World's Best Selling New Age Artist	Won	
World Music Awards	2001	Enya	World's Best Selling Irish Artist	Won	
World Music Awards	2002	Enya	World's Best Selling Female Artist	Won	
World Music Awards	2002	Enya	World's Best New Age Artist	Won	
World Music Awards	2002	Enya	World's Best Selling Irish Artist	Won	
World Music Awards	2006	Enya	World's Best Selling Irish Artist	Won	
Žebřík Music Awards	1993	Enya	Best International Female	Nominated	
Žebřík Music Awards	1997	Enya	Best International Female	Nominated	
Žebřík Music Awards	2005	Enya	Best International Female	Nominated	
