= Paint the Sky with Stars =

Paint the Sky with Stars: The Best of Enya

Greatest hits album by Enya
- Released: 3 November 1997 (Europe)
- Recorded: 1986–1997
- Length: 57:46
- Label: WEA
- Producer: Nicky Ryan

Enya chronology
The Memory of Trees (1995)	Paint the Sky with Stars: The Best of Enya (1997)	A Box of Dreams (1997)

Singles from Paint the Sky with Stars
- 1. "Only If..." Released: 10 November 1997

Paint the Sky with Stars: The Best of Enya is the first greatest hits album by Irish singer and composer Enya, released on 3 November 1997 by WEA. Following her worldwide promotional tour in support of her previous album The Memory of Trees (1995), Enya began selecting tracks for a compilation album in early 1997, as her recording contract with WEA permitted her to do so. The album contains songs from her debut album Enya (1987) to The Memory of Trees (1995) and two new tracks, "Paint the Sky with Stars" and "Only If...".

Paint the Sky with Stars received positive reviews from critics and was a commercial success, reaching number 4 in the United Kingdom and number 30 on the Billboard 200 in the United States. In the latter territory, the album continued to sell over the next eight years, reaching four million copies shipped in 2005. In Japan, it became the first non-Japanese album under the Warner label to receive a Japan Gold Disc Award in the Grand Prix Album category for selling over one million copies.

== Critical reception ==
Professional ratings
Review scores
Source	Rating
AllMusic	5/5 stars
Music Week	4/5 stars
The Rolling Stone Album Guide	3.5/5 stars

Paint the Sky with Stars received universal acclaim from music critics. Stephen Thomas Erlewine from AllMusic rated the album five stars out of five and says that Paint the Sky with Stars: The Best of Enya is an excellent 16-song overview of Enya's career, containing 14 selections from The Celts, Watermark, Shepherd Moons, and The Memory of Trees, including "Caribbean Blue", "Anywhere Is", "Marble Halls", "Book of Days" and, of course, "Orinoco Flow"—as well as two previously unreleased songs ("Only If...", "Paint the Sky with Stars") that fit comfortably with her past work.

== Track listing ==
All lyrics written by Roma Ryan (except for "Marble Halls"), all music composed by Enya and all songs produced by Nicky Ryan.

No.	Title	From the album	Length
1.	"Orinoco Flow"	Watermark	4:26
2.	"Caribbean Blue"	Shepherd Moons	3:58
3.	"Book of Days"	Far and Away (Single Version)	2:56
4.	"Anywhere Is"	The Memory of Trees	3:46
5.	"Only If..."	Previously unreleased	3:19
6.	"The Celts"	Enya	2:57
7.	"China Roses"	The Memory of Trees	4:40
8.	"Shepherd Moons"	Shepherd Moons	3:40
9.	"Ebudæ"	Shepherd Moons	1:52
10.	"Storms in Africa"	Watermark	4:11
11.	"Watermark"	Watermark	2:26
12.	"Paint the Sky with Stars"	Previously unreleased	4:15
13.	"Marble Halls"	Shepherd Moons	3:55
14.	"On My Way Home" (Single Version)	The Memory of Trees	3:38
15.	"The Memory of Trees"	The Memory of Trees	4:19
16.	"Boadicea"	Enya	3:28
Total length:			57:46

Japanese bonus track
No.	Title	From the album	Length
17.	"Oíche Chiún (Silent Night)"	B-side of "Evening Falls...", "How Can I Keep from Singing?", "The Celts" and "Only If..."	3:48
Total length:			61:34

== Production ==
- Produced by Nicky Ryan
- Arranged by Enya and Nicky Ryan
- Lyrics by Roma Ryan
- Marble Halls (Traditional) arranged by Enya and Nicky Ryan
- All tracks published by EMI Songs Ltd
- Principal photography: David Scheinmann
- Calligraphy and Design: Brody Neuenschwander
- Mastered by Arun

== Accolades ==
=== Japan Gold Disc Awards ===
Year	Nominee / work	Award	Result
1998	Paint the Sky with Stars	Best International Pop Albums of the Year	Won

== Charts ==
=== Weekly charts ===
Weekly chart performance for Paint the Sky with Stars
Chart (1997–1998)	Peak position
Australian Albums Chart	10
Austrian Albums Chart	3
Belgian Albums Chart (Flanders)	9
Belgian Albums Chart (Wallonia)	13
Canadian RPM Albums Chart	33
Dutch Albums Chart	10
Finnish Albums Chart	12
German Media Control Albums Chart	5
Hungarian Albums Chart	12
Italian Albums Chart	1
Japanese Oricon Albums Chart	4
New Zealand Albums Chart	6
Norwegian Albums Chart	2
Spanish Albums Chart	2
Swedish Albums Chart	1
Swiss Albums Chart	7
Taiwanese International Albums (IFPI)	1
UK Albums Chart	4
US Billboard 200	30

=== Year-end charts ===
1997 year-end chart performance for Paint the Sky with Stars
Chart (1997)	Position
Australian Albums Chart	41
Belgian Albums Chart (Flanders)	33
Belgian Albums Chart (Wallonia)	47
European Albums Chart	56
German Albums Chart	88
Swedish Albums Chart	3
UK Albums Chart	19
US Billboard New Age Albums Chart	24

1998 year-end chart performance for Paint the Sky with Stars
Chart (1998)	Position
Australian Albums Chart	67
Austrian Albums Chart	50
Belgian Albums Chart (Flanders)	46
Belgian Albums Chart (Wallonia)	83
Dutch Albums Chart	57
European Albums Chart	24
German Albums Chart	65
Japanese Albums Chart	44
Swedish Albums Chart	47
UK Albums Chart	90
US Billboard 200	83
US Billboard New Age Albums Chart	2

1999 year-end chart performance for Paint the Sky with Stars
Chart (1999)	Position
US Billboard New Age Albums Chart	3

== Certifications and sales ==
Certifications and sales for Paint the Sky with Stars
Region	Certification	Certified units/sales
Argentina (CAPIF)	2× Platinum	120,000^{^}
Australia (ARIA)	3× Platinum	210,000^{^}
Austria (IFPI Austria)	Platinum	50,000^{*}
Belgium (BRMA)	2× Platinum	100,000^{*}
Brazil (Pro-Música Brasil)	2× Platinum	500,000^{*}
Finland (Musiikkituottajat)	Gold	23,900
Germany (BVMI)	Platinum	500,000^{^}
Hong Kong (IFPI Hong Kong)	Platinum	20,000^{*}
Italy	—	410,000
Japan (RIAJ)	Million	1,078,000
Netherlands (NVPI)	Gold	50,000^{^}
New Zealand (RMNZ)	Platinum	15,000^{^}
Norway (IFPI Norway)	Platinum	50,000^{*}
Spain (Promusicae)	2× Platinum	200,000^{^}
Sweden (GLF)	2× Platinum	160,000^{^}
Switzerland (IFPI Switzerland)	Platinum	50,000^{^}
United Kingdom (BPI)	2× Platinum	600,000^{^}
United States (RIAA)	4× Platinum	4,000,000^{^}
Summaries
Europe (IFPI)	3× Platinum	3,000,000^{*}
Worldwide	—	12,000,000
^{*} Sales figures based on certification alone.^{^} Shipments figures based on certification alone.

== Release history ==
Release dates for Paint the Sky with Stars
Country	Date	Format	Label
Europe	3 November 1997	CD; cassette	WEA Records
United States	11 November 1997	CD; cassette	Reprise Records

== See also ==
- List of best-selling albums in Brazil
