= A Day Without Rain =

Studio album by Enya
- Released: 20 November 2000
- Recorded: 1998–2000
- Studios: Aigle, Killiney, County Dublin, Ireland
- Genres: New-age; Chamber pop
- Length: 37:30
- Labels: WEA (Europe); Reprise (US)
- Producer: Nicky Ryan

Enya chronology
A Box of Dreams (1997)	A Day Without Rain (2000)	Themes from Calmi Cuori Appassionati (2001)

Singles from A Day Without Rain
- 1. "Only Time" Released: 6 November 2000; 2. "Wild Child" Released: 19 March 2001

A Day Without Rain is the fifth studio album by Irish singer and composer Enya, released on 20 November 2000 by WEA in Europe and on 21 November 2000 by Reprise Records in the US. Following a promotional tour in support of her compilation albums Paint the Sky with Stars and A Box of Dreams in late 1997, Enya started work on a new studio album in mid-1998 with her longtime recording partners, producer and arranger Nicky Ryan and his wife, lyricist Roma Ryan.

A Day Without Rain received mixed reviews from critics; some felt it too derivative of Enya's previous albums whilst others complimented the minimal use of overdubbing that her sound had become known for. It was a commercial success peaking at No. 6 in the United Kingdom and initially, No. 17 on the Billboard 200 in the United States. Following the 11 September 2001 attacks, sales of the album and its lead single, "Only Time", skyrocketed after it was used by several radio and television networks in their coverage and aftermath of the attacks. As a result, "Only Time" climbed to No. 10 on the Billboard Hot 100 singles chart and A Day Without Rain reached a new peak on the Billboard 200 at No. 2. It became the fifth highest selling album of 2001 in the United States. To date, it remains Enya's best-selling album in the United States, selling over 7 million copies.

A Day Without Rain is the best selling new age album in history as well as Enya's best selling album worldwide, with an estimated 16 million copies sold worldwide. Enya supported it with a promotional tour which included live televised performances. In 2002, the album won Enya her third Grammy Award for Best New Age Album.

== Background and recording ==
Following a promotional tour in support of her two compilation albums Paint the Sky with Stars and A Box of Dreams at the end of 1997, Enya started work on a new studio album in the mid-1998 with her longtime recording partners, producer and arranger Nicky Ryan and his wife, lyricist Roma Ryan. It marked her first studio album since The Memory of Trees in 1995. Around the time of starting on A Day Without Rain, Enya questioned some decisions she had made in her life and found herself answering them in the songs she was writing. She compared the album to reading her own diary: "Like in 'Pilgrim' I was asking myself: So many years have passed, am I happy with the way I'm working? And my answer is that I wouldn't change anything. I really love what I do."

A Day Without Rain was written and recorded in a similar way to Enya's previous albums and without a timeline or deadline set by their label. She first spends time alone developing melodies and outlines of songs on the piano, which she then presents to the Ryans: "I'm quite anxious at this point because it really is an act of laying your soul bare". While Roma starts to write lyrics to the melodies, Enya and Nicky develop them into completed arrangements. After two years' work, Enya felt it was time to "step out of the studio ... time for it to have its life out in the world". The album was recorded at Aigle, the Ryan's home studio in Killiney, County Dublin. Enya adopted a less intensive schedule, working just five days a week and having weekends off instead of working seven days like she had done on The Memory of Trees. The change made her feel happier as a result.

In a musical departure from her keyboard-oriented sound, the album features a string section which Enya said was not a conscious decision initially. Nicky Ryan and she were open to exploring all possibilities with the songs, and stick with elements that give the best creative result. Most of the songs were written in the major key, as Enya believed it helped create a more positive and uplifting mood.

== Songs ==
"Flora's Secret" is a song that makes reference to Flora, the Roman mythological goddess of flowers. Enya and Roma incorporated some of Enya's experiences from her own love life on "Only Time" and "Fallen Embers". The former alludes to the difficulties and pressures of finding "the perfect love", which Enya has found difficult throughout her career due to her private lifestyle and that her past relationships were not the right ones.

A Day Without Rain opens with an instrumental title track, which Enya had also done on her previous four studio albums. It was named after the high amount of rainfall over Ireland in the course of a year. After one particular stretch of consistent rain over a few days the sun came out, which inspired Enya to write it. She described its meaning as "the mood of a particularly peaceful day". It was planned for the track to be a song and Roma had prepared an incomplete set of lyrics for it, but as the arrangement developed it was decided for it to remain instrumental. "Wild Child" is a song about embracing positivity and finding moments for yourself during difficult days. "Deora Ar Mo Chroí" is Irish for "Tears on My Heart".

Enya gave permission for "Only Time" to be included in the soundtrack to the romantic film Sweet November (2001) where one of the lead characters finds out they are dying of cancer. She agreed in connection with the death of Irish musician Frankie Kennedy, co-founder of the Celtic group Altan with his wife Mairéad Ní Mhaonaigh, from bone cancer in 1994. Enya played synthesiser on their album Ceol Aduaidh (1983), and found Kennedy's death particularly sad. "Tempus Vernum" is a darker and moody track in comparison to the opening three tracks that Enya said represents the fragility of life and how we are all together as one in its struggles.

"Flora's Secret" is about two lovers laying on the grass on a romantic afternoon. Enya singled out "Fallen Embers" as her favourite track on A Day Without Rain. She knew it was a particularly strong track when she presented it to Roma, who understood the emotion that she tried to put across musically. After Roma finished its lyrics, Enya recalled, "It was so moving to actually sing them". Billboard magazine rated it as Enya's best vocal performance of her career at the time. The song is about the reminiscence of a lost love, "a celebration of that special time and a lament that it is over." According to Roma Ryan, the lyrics to "Pilgrim" were inspired by Mahatma Gandhi and Nelson Mandela. The song is about a journey of self-discovery on a more broad scale.

"The First of Autumn" is an instrumental that gained inspiration from a poem Roma had written as part of a collection of poems about the seasons. Among them was a haiku that was first printed in the liner notes to Enya's limited edition box set Only Time – The Collection (2002). The Japanese edition of the album includes "Isobella", a song that Roma described as a song for "A spirit child. One whom both Enya and myself experienced yet know nothing about", and named it Isobella.

== Release ==
A Day Without Rain received a launch party at Somerset House in London on 19 October 2000, where guests received a promotional CD of the album containing a personal organiser and a handmade frontispiece. It was released in the UK on 20 November 2000 on Warner Music. Its North American release followed on 21 November on Reprise Records. In the US, Reprise promoted A Day Without Rain with an Internet-driven campaign that involved E-cards and Amazon.com pages with 30-second snippets of "Only Time", exclusive displays offered at select retail stores, and a dedicated section of the label's web page to the album. It went on to reach, before the 11 September attacks, an initial peak of No. 17 on the US Billboard 200 in December 2000 and No. 6 on the UK Albums Chart.

"Only Time" was released as the album's lead single on 6 November 2000 in the United States and on 13 November 2000 in the United Kingdom. A promotional edition was shipped to adult contemporary radio stations across the US on 24 October, and the song premiered on the nationally-syndicated radio show Delilah on the same day. Its music video, directed by Graham Fink, was distributed to various music television networks from 31 October. The song gained nationwide radio airplay following its use in an episode of the drama series Providence and the soundtrack to Sweet November (2001). By October 2001, the single had spent 43 weeks at No. 1 on the Billboard New Age chart. The song, in April 2001, was remixed without authorisation with added electronic dance beats and keyboards by the Swiss American Federation (S.A.F.), a group formed of Los Angeles-based radio DJ and producer Christian Burkholder, a longtime Enya fan, and Marc Dold. The song received radio airplay in Los Angeles before it spread to stations across the country. When the song aired on WHTZ in New York City in June, other stations followed suit, which led to Burkholder being contacted by Nicky and Enya, who approved his remix. The second single released from A Day Without Rain, "Wild Child", was issued on 19 March 2001. It charted on the Billboard Adult Contemporary chart with a peak of No. 12. Its B-side, "Midnight Blue", is originally an instrumental that was extended with added vocals. It was then renamed as the title track for Enya's album And Winter Came... (2008).

In 2001, the album won Best International Pop Albums of the Year at the Japan Gold Disc Awards. In 2002, it won a Grammy Award for Best New Age Album.

=== 9/11 aftermath ===
Following the 11 September 2001 attacks, "Only Time" was used in radio and television coverage of the disaster, which led to increased sales and radio airplay of the single and A Day Without Rain, to the point of both records surpassing their initial peak on the US charts. CNN and ABC News, among other networks, played the song with "Fallen Embers" as backdrops of footage of the victims. Its position on the Billboard 200 climbed from No. 20 prior to the attacks to its all-time peak of No. 2, driven by the increased audience exposure of "Only Time". In the same month, "Only Time" reached No. 1 on the Billboard Adult Contemporary chart after it already spent 33 weeks on the chart, breaking a seven-year-old record for the longest climb to the top position in the chart's history. In November 2001, the single climbed to its peak of No. 10 on the Billboard Hot 100 chart, making it Enya's highest-charting single in the US. From October 2001 to January 2002, over 3 million RIAA-certified units of A Day Without Rain were sold in the US alone, which included a peak of one million copies sold in 19 days.

"Only Time" gained further exposure following its use as a sound bed for promos of the comedy series Friends on the first five episodes of the eighth season. Following the media response and increased sales of Enya's records, "Only Time" was reissued as a maxi-CD on 20 November 2001 containing the S.A.F remix and original version, with earnings from its sales donated to the Uniform Firefighters Association's Widows' and Children's Fund in aid of families of fire fighters involved in the attack rescue operations.

A Day Without Rain became the eighth highest selling album worldwide in 2001, selling 6.6 million copies. It also was the top selling new age album of the 2000s in the US, according to Nielsen SoundScan. It remains Enya's highest selling album of her career with a total of 16 million copies sold worldwide.

=== Critical reception ===
Professional ratings
Aggregate scores
Source	Rating
Metacritic	41/100
Review scores
Source	Rating
AllMusic	3/5 stars
Entertainment Weekly	D
Los Angeles Times	3/4 stars
Q	2/5 stars
Rolling Stone	2/5 stars
The Village Voice	D−

A Day Without Rain received mixed reviews from music critics. In a review for Dallas Morning News, Mario Tarradell gave a rating of "B+". He thought the album was worth the five-year wait since The Memory of Trees and is "another lovely piece of work" from Enya. The title track is "an elegant piano melody" that is followed by "dark-to-light, chaos-to-peace progression" for the rest of the album. "Lazy Days", he thought, was "an engulfing pop song filled with swooshing flourishes that one-ups the hooky, wall-of-sound pull" of Enya's past singles "Orinoco Flow" and "Caribbean Blue". Tarradell finalises with the album is "quintessential Enya". Fiona Shepherd reviewed the album for The Scotsman and was more critical, writing Enya continues a "policy of releasing the same album over and over again using a different title and cover" with "drab Celtic moods". She thought the album was not on par with her "earlier epic stuff". A critical review appeared from Gavin Martin of The Mirror, who thought that the title track and "Only Time" would please her fans, but the album "still sounds like undistinguished new age fodder ... The rest of us can go back to watching paint dry."

R.S. Murthi for New Straits Times gave a rating of two-and-a-half stars out of five for Enya's performance and three out of five for the album's sound quality. He wrote that the album is a "ho-hum New Age effort" with "pretty melodies" but, on the other hand, its "dense textures conceal a compositional shallowness". He deemed some of the track titles "pompous" but the more successful songs, such as "Deora Ar Mo Chroi", are so due to their traditional Celtic elements rather than Enya's own compositions. Stephen Thompson of The A.V. Club found it too derivative of Enya's previous albums, which he found far superior to A Day Without Rain. In his review for The Village Voice, Robert Christgau panned the album as nonsense, "goopier, more simplistic" than Watermark (1988).

Steve Morse welcomed the album in a report for The Boston Globe. He thought the album is "arguably her best work because there is more emphasis on her gorgeous soprano lead vocals rather than the lush, multitracked harmony vocals". Billboard complimented the album's production, writing the more experimental songs like "Only Time" and "Lazy Days" "not only freshen a musical formula that still works extremely well but also leave the listener happily curious about Enya's next move". Rolling Stone remarked that the album sounded too similar to her previous releases and thought a change in musical direction after Paint the Sky with Stars would have been better. Her "skill at ephemeral sonic watercolors has grown wearisome, like a relative who tells the same stories every holiday." In The Baltimore Sun, J. D. Considine thought the album belonged in "the same lush, contemplative vein" as Enya's previous albums, which he thought were formed of "pretty but unconnected" tracks. A Day Without Rain, however, was more of a unified album that compared to "a suite instead of a pop album". "One by One", he thought, "conveys all the qualities of a pop hit without succumbing to the typical transience of a Top-40 favorite". People recommended the "masterful" album for a "rainy day" because of Enya's characteristic sound and tranquil mood.

== Track listing ==
All music by Enya, all lyrics by Roma Ryan except "Deora Ar Mo Chroí" adapted into Irish lyrics by Enya from Roma Ryan's poem in English. All songs produced by Nicky Ryan.

No.	Title	Length
1.	"A Day Without Rain"	2:36
2.	"Wild Child"	3:47
3.	"Only Time"	3:38
4.	"Tempus Vernum"	2:24
5.	"Deora Ar Mo Chroí"	2:48
6.	"Flora's Secret"	4:07
7.	"Fallen Embers"	2:28
8.	"Silver Inches"	1:37
9.	"Pilgrim"	3:12
10.	"One by One"	3:56
11.	"The First of Autumn"	3:08
12.	"Lazy Days"	3:43
Total length:		37:30

US edition
No.	Title	Length
11.	"Lazy Days"	3:43

("The First of Autumn" was omitted from the US edition)

Japanese edition
No.	Title	Length
11.	"Isobella"	4:29
12.	"Lazy Days"	3:43

("Isobella" replaced "The First of Autumn" on the Japanese edition)

== Personnel ==
Credits adapted from the album's 2000 liner notes.

Music

- Enya – lead vocals, backing vocals, piano, keyboard, violin, cello, percussion, Irish adaptation
- Wired Strings – additional strings

Production

- Enya – arrangement, mixing
- Nicky Ryan – production, arrangement, engineering, mixing
- Stylorouge – design, art direction
- Sheila Rock – front cover photography, other photography
- Simon Fowler – photography
- The Handsome Foundation – costume design
- Dick Beetham – mastering at 360 Mastering

== Charts ==
=== Weekly charts ===
Weekly chart performance for A Day Without Rain
Chart (2000–02)	Peak position
Argentine Albums (CAPIF)	6
Australian Albums Chart	4
Austrian Albums Chart	1
Belgian Ultratop Albums Chart (Flanders)	9
Belgian Ultratop Albums Chart (Wallonia)	5
Canadian Albums (Billboard)	4
Colombian Albums (ASINCOL)	7
Danish Albums Chart	5
Dutch Albums Chart	2
Finnish Albums Chart	29
French SNEP Albums Chart	33
German Media Control Albums Chart	1
Hungarian Albums Chart	15
Irish Albums Chart	7
Italian Albums Chart	6
Japanese Oricon Albums Chart	4
New Zealand Albums Chart	5
Norwegian Albums Chart	12
Spanish Albums Chart	3
Swedish Albums Chart	4
Swiss Albums Chart	2
UK Albums Chart	6
US Billboard 200	2

=== Year-end charts ===
2000 year-end chart performance for A Day Without Rain
Chart (2000)	Position
Australian Albums Chart	66
Belgian Albums Chart (Wallonia)	71
Canadian Albums (Nielsen SoundScan	90
Dutch Albums Chart	82
Italian Albums Chart	27
South Korean International Albums Chart	48
Spanish Albums Chart	33
Swiss Albums Chart	91

2001 year-end chart performance for A Day Without Rain
Chart (2001)	Position
Australian Albums Chart	62
Austrian Albums Chart	4
Belgian Albums Chart (Flanders)	52
Belgian Albums Chart (Wallonia)	31
Canadian Albums (Nielsen SoundScan)	2
Danish Albums (Hitlisten)	62
Dutch Albums Chart	11
German Albums Chart	5
Italian Albums Chart	87
Japanese Albums Chart	62
Swiss Albums Chart	6
US Billboard 200	8
Worldwide Albums (IFPI)	5

2002 year-end chart performance for A Day Without Rain
Chart (2002)	Position
Austrian Albums Chart	36
Canadian Albums (Nielsen SoundScan)	46
Dutch Albums Chart	19
German Albums Chart	29
Swiss Albums Chart	66
US Billboard 200	18

=== All-time charts ===
All-time chart performance for A Day Without Rain
Chart	Position
US Billboard 200	153

== Certifications ==
Certifications and sales for A Day Without Rain
Region	Certification	Certified units/sales
Argentina (CAPIF)	Gold	30,000^{^}
Australia (ARIA)	3× Platinum	210,000^{^}
Austria (IFPI Austria)	Platinum	50,000^{*}
Belgium (BRMA)	2× Platinum	100,000^{*}
Brazil (Pro-Música Brasil)	Gold	100,000^{*}
Canada (Music Canada)	8× Platinum	800,000^{^}
Denmark (IFPI Danmark)	Platinum	50,000^{^}
France (SNEP)	Gold	100,000^{*}
Germany (BVMI)	3× Platinum	900,000^{^}
Italy	—	250,000
Japan (RIAJ)	4× Platinum	800,000^{^}
Mexico (AMPROFON)	Gold	75,000^{^}
Netherlands (NVPI)	3× Platinum	240,000^{^}
New Zealand (RMNZ)	Platinum	15,000^{^}
Poland (ZPAV)	Gold	50,000^{*}
Spain (Promusicae)	2× Platinum	200,000^{^}
Sweden (GLF)	Platinum	80,000^{^}
Switzerland (IFPI Switzerland)	2× Platinum	100,000^{^}
United Kingdom (BPI)	2× Platinum	600,000^{^}
United States (RIAA)	7× Platinum	7,000,000^{^}
Summaries
Europe (IFPI)	3× Platinum	3,000,000^{*}
Worldwide	—	16,000,000
^{*} Sales figures based on certification alone.^{^} Shipments figures based on certification alone.

== Release history ==
Release dates for A Day Without Rain
Country	Date	Format	Label
Europe	20 November 2000	CD; cassette; MiniDisc	WEA
United States	21 November 2000	CD; cassette; MiniDisc	Reprise
Worldwide	16 June 2017	LP	WEA; Reprise
