= Aileron (disambiguation) =

Aileron may refer to:

== Aviation ==
- Aileron, an aircraft control surface

== Architecture ==
- Aileron (architecture), an architectural element

== Places ==
- Aileron Homestead No. 1, in Anmatjere, Northern Territory

== Music ==
- The Ailerons, an indie rock band
