= Only If =

Only If may refer to:

- Only If (video game)
- "Only If...", 1997 song by Enya
