= The Alice Band =

British pop group

The Alice Band were a pop group formed in 2000 by Rob Dickins and featured the artists Charity Hair from Florida, Amy Lindop from Glasgow and Audrey Nugent from Dublin. All three artists were vocalists and played guitar.

== Discography ==
=== Album ===
The Alice Band's only album release was The Love Junk Store (2002). The album was produced by Giles Martin and released by Instant Karma. It featured the singles "One Day at a Time", "Nothin’ On But the Radio" and "Now That You Love Me". "Nothin' On But the Radio" also featured on Disc 1 of the Pepsi Chart 2002 album.

The album received mixed reviews. Ian Hyland of The Sunday Mirror gave it 7/10 and Mike Pattenden of The Times gave it 3*. The Express on Sunday called the music "catchy country pop tunes" whilst it was received negatively by The Express, "unexceptional and lightweight"; Sunday Tribune, "Soulless stuff"; and Sunday Mercury's Paul Cole wrote that most of the album is "blandly forgettable". The Observer wrote that the "trio reeks of commercial calculation" and the album had "catchy if clichéd songs".

- The Love Junk Store (2002)

Track	Name
1.	"Ten Year Night"
2.	"One Day at a Time"
3.	"January's Child"
4.	"Angel"
5.	"Now That You Love Me"
6.	"Everything I'm Looking For"
7.	"One Good Thing"
8.	"Nothing On But the Radio"
9.	"Tambourine Song"
10.	"Annie"
11.	"Lights Are Changing"
12.	"Is This All"

=== Singles ===
- "One Day at a Time" (2001)

Track	Name
1.	"One Day at a Time"
2.	"Your Eyes"
3.	"After the Goldrush"
4.	"One Day at a Time" (Video)

- "Nothing On But the Radio" (2002)
- "Now That You Love Me" (2002)

Track	Name
1.	"Now That You Love Me"
2.	"Inside of You"
3.	"Lucky One"
4.	"Now That You Love Me"

- "(Don't Fear) The Reaper" (2002) (Blue Öyster Cult cover)

Track	Name
1.	"(Don't Fear) The Reaper"
2.	"Your Eyes Undressed Me"
3.	"Everything I'm Looking For"
4.	"(Don't Fear) The Reaper" (enhanced video)

== After the band ==
Amy Lindop, now known as Amy Belle, and Audrey Nugent are solo artists, and also performed as the duo Nugent & Belle. In 2006 Charity Hair joined The Ailerons as lead singer, and in 2008 joined Red Sky July.
