= Red Sky July =

British alternative country band

- Genres: Alternative country
- Years active: 2009–present
- Labels: Proper Records
- Members: Ally McErlaine; Shelly Poole; Haley Giennie-Smith
- Past members: Charity Hair
- Website: redskyjuly.co.uk

Red Sky July are a British alternative country band, consisting of husband and wife Ally McErlaine (ex-Texas) and Shelly Poole (ex-Alisha's Attic) along with esteemed vocalist Haley Glennie-Smith. Glennie-Smith was a replacement for Charity Hair (The Alice Band and The Ailerons). They are influenced by alt country and Americana. They have released three albums since their formation in 2009.

== Career ==
Prior to the band entering the studio to record their debut album, the project was put on standby as McErlaine suffered a brain aneurysm. After his recovery, the band reconvened to record the self-titled album. Throughout 2012 the band raised their profile while 2013 marked a return to the live performance. They embarked on their own UK wide tour while supporting Deacon Blue, James Walsh (Starsailor) and Jools Holland.

Red Sky July returned to the studio to record their follow up album, Shadowbirds, which was released in September 2014. The album entered the official UK charts country album chart at number 3 and featured a collaboration with Jack Savoretti. The band toured in support of the album after its release while supporting Sheryl Crow and 10cc. Red Sky July were presented with a prestigious Tartan Clef award at the Scottish Music Awards by Nordoff-Robbins music therapy. In 2016, they appeared at the C2C festival. Also in 2016, they appeared at Glastonbury and the Isle Of Wight festival.

Following their appearance at C2C, the band released their third studio album The Truth and the Lie in March 2016, which reached number 3 on the official UK country chart. This album featured guest musicians such as Mark Neary (pedal steel), Dave Etherington (piano), Ross Hamilton (drums/bass) and songwriter Beth Nielsen Chapman who features on the track "Strathconon". The track "In Black" is an autobiographical account of Red Sky July member Ally McErlaine's battle with a brain aneurysm told through the eyes of his wife Shelly

== Discography ==
=== Albums ===
- Red Sky July (October 2011)
- Shadowbirds (September 2014)
- The Truth and the Lie (March 2016)

=== Singles and EPs ===
- "Morning Song" (September 2011)
- Silent Night EP (December 2012)
- "Shadowbirds" (September 2014)
- "Christmas Time" (December 2014)
- "Save Christmas Day" (December 2015)
- "The Truth and the Lie" (March 2016)
- Voyager EP (October 2016)
- Radio Mixes EP (June 2017)

== Awards and nominations ==
| Year | Association | Award | Nominated work |
|---|---|---|---|
| 2016 | British Country Music Association | Group of the Year | Red Sky July |
| 2016 | British Country Music Association | UK Album of the Year | The Truth and the Lie |

== Media appearances ==
Red Sky July featured on BBC Radio 2's Wake up to Wogan on 15 April 2012.

Ricky Ross held an interview and session with Red Sky July.
