= Enya (album) =

1986 studio album by Enya

- Standard cover. Several CD editions have a black border instead of white.

Studio album / Soundtrack album by Enya
- Released: 9 February 1987; November 1992 (reissue)
- Recorded: 1985–1986
- Studios: Aigle Studio (Artane, Dublin); BBC Enterprises Studio Woodlands (Wood Lane, London)
- Genres: New-age; Celtic; Gaelic
- Length: 39:36 (1987); 41:25 (1992)
- Labels: BBC (1987, UK); Atlantic (1987, US); WEA (1992, Europe); Reprise (1992, US)
- Producer: Nicky Ryan

Enya chronology
The Frog Prince: The Original Soundtrack Recording (1985)	Enya (1987)	Watermark (1988)

Singles from Enya
- 1. "I Want Tomorrow" Released: 9 March 1987

The Celts cover

Singles from The Celts
- 1. "The Celts" Released: 2 November 1992

Enya is the debut studio album by Irish singer and composer Enya, released on 9 February 1987 by BBC Records in the UK and by Atlantic Records in the US. It was renamed as The Celts for the 1992 international re-release of the album by WEA Records in Europe and by Reprise Records in the US. The album features a selection of music that she recorded for the soundtrack to The Celts, a BBC documentary series about the origins, growth, and influence of Celtic culture.

Four years into her largely unnoticed solo career, Enya landed her first major project in 1985 when producer Tony McAuley asked her to contribute a song for the project. It was well received by director David Richardson, who subsequently offered her to compose for the entire series. Enya worked with her longtime recording partners, producer and arranger Nicky Ryan and his wife, lyricist Roma Ryan. Several track titles are titled or based on various historical and mythological figures and stories associated with the Celts, and established Enya's sound of keyboard-oriented music and layered vocals. "Boadicea" has been sampled by various artists, most notably in 1996 by the Fugees, in 2004 by Mario Winans with P. Diddy and in 2022 by Metro Boomin.

Enya received mostly mixed reviews from critics when it was initially released. It was a commercial success in Ireland, peaking at No. 8, and No. 69 on the UK Albums Chart. "I Want Tomorrow" and "The Celts" were released as singles; the latter went to No. 29 in the UK. The album caught the attention of Warner chairman Rob Dickins, who signed Enya to the label. After the commercial success of her next two albums, Enya was reissued as The Celts and outperformed its original sales; it went to No. 10 in the UK and was certified Platinum in the UK and the US. In 2009, The Celts was reissued in Japan with a bonus track.

== Background and recording ==
Following her work on the soundtrack to the romantic comedy film The Frog Prince (1985), Enya's first major project as a solo artist followed when, in 1985, she was invited by producer Tony McAuley to compose a track for his 1987 BBC television documentary series The Celts. As a coincidence, Enya had recorded a track named "March of the Celts" before she was asked to be involved, and decided to submit it to the project. Initially, each episode of the series was to feature a different composer, but series director David Richardson liked Enya's track so much, he commissioned her to compose the entire score.

Enya worked with her usual recording partners, arranger and producer Nicky Ryan and his wife, lyricist Roma Ryan. The album was recorded in two locations; at Aigle Studio, a 16-track studio installed in the Ryans' home, then located in Artane, a northern suburb of Dublin, and a sound studio at BBC Enterprises at Wood Lane, London. When they recorded at the BBC studio, Nicky had to teach the audio engineers how he and Enya worked as their unusual recording process confused them at first. Nicky said he told them "to forget everything [they had] learned and just bear with us for at least a week". One such example was Nicky's use of reverb, which he set to 24 seconds instead of the more common placement of one-and-a-half seconds.

A total of 72 minutes of music was recorded for the series. Roma recalled that Enya was given "various pastiches" that Richardson wished to incorporate into the episodes, which Enya then used as a guide for to write music to complement them. Enya includes 39 minutes of selected pieces from the soundtrack. The album's front cover depicts Enya posing with stuffed wolves.

== Music and lyrics ==
Several of the album's track titles are titled or based on various historical figures and stories. In writing about the song in 2002, Roma pointed out that "Aldebaran" is named after the brightest star in the constellation of Taurus. In the Arabic language, the title translates to "the follower" as it follows the Pleiades cluster of stars, and the song is based on future Celtic people "passing Aldebaran on their journey to new territories, continuing their migratory pattern which was so predominant in their early history." The track was recorded in its entirety at Aigle Studio as Nicky expressed the difficulty in having to recreate the recording process elsewhere. "The Celts" was used as the main title theme for the television series. "Boadicea", which means "victorious", is a reference to the queen Boudica of the British-Celtic Iceni tribe in East Anglia who led a resistance against the occupying forces of the Roman Empire in 60 A.D., but was defeated and subsequently poisoned herself. As a song about her was already written, Richardson wished for a new track that depicted the idea of "being spellbound" by Boudica, which turned into "I Want Tomorrow". In the liner notes of the album's 1992 reissue, "I Want Tomorrow" is described, simply, as "thoughts of the present" and "March of the Celts" "echoes from the past". "Deireadh an Tuath", which translates from Irish as "End of the Tribe", refers to past spirits and the fertile soil that helps ensure the future of the Celtic people, which is celebrated in the annual Gaelic festival Samhain, held on 31 October. "The Sun in the Stream" was inspired by the legend of the Salmon of Knowledge, a creature written about in various texts in Irish mythology who "possessed all the truth in the world".

"Fairytale" is a track based on a story of early Irish literature about "love, jealousy, secrets and endurance" between Midir, a fairy king, and his love for a princess, Étaín. In the story, Étaín is banished and transformed into a pool of water and emerges from it as a butterfly. "Epona" is the name of the horse goddess Epona of the Gallo-Roman religion. "Triad" is a track formed of three sections; "St. Patrick" is a traditional song that refers to Saint Patrick who spent six years in captivity after he was captured by the Celtic people. "St. Patrick" lyrics were adapted from ancient hymn "Deus Meus Adiuva Me". The second part, "Cú Chulainn", Irish for "hound of Culann", is named after the culture hero Cú Chulainn. "Oisin", the final section, meaning "little fawn", is based on the mythological character Oisín. "Bard Dance" refers to the bard, a man of ancient Celtic times who entertained the king. "Dan y Dŵr", which translates to "Under the Water" in the Welsh language, is based on the intentional flooding of the village of Capel Celyn in Wales in order to accommodate a reservoir, Llyn Celyn.

== Release ==
Enya was released on audio cassette and vinyl in February 1987 by BBC Records in the United Kingdom through EMI Records. The label was enthusiastic about the album and decided to release it three months before the series aired on television. The album was released in the United States by Atlantic Records, which categorised it as a new age album and placed an imprint saying so on the disc, which Nicky Ryan later thought was "a cowardly thing to do". The album gained enough public interest to reach number eight on the Irish Albums Chart. In the United Kingdom, it entered the UK Albums Chart at number 79 for the week of 6 June 1987, climbing to its peak of number 69 on its fourth and final week on the chart, the week of 27 June.

Enya released "I Want Tomorrow" as a single on 9 March 1987 as a 7-inch and compact disc with "The Celts" as the B-side. A maxi single was also released with the aforementioned tracks and "To Go Beyond (I)" and "To Go Beyond (II)". Following the album's reissue in 1992, "The Celts" was released as a single on 2 November 1992 with "Eclipse", a previously unreleased track from the Enya sessions, as a B-side. Another unreleased track, "Spaghetti Western Theme from The Celts", was released in 2005 as a B-side for Enya's 2005 single "Amarantine". It was released in memory of McAuley following his death in 2003.

Filmmaker David Bickley reused music from the soundtrack in The Memory of Earth, an instalment in his documentary trilogy Mythological Lands. "Boadicea" was also used in the soundtrack of the 1992 American film Sleepwalkers. "Epona" appears in the 1991 Steve Martin romantic comedy L.A. Story.

=== 1992 reissue ===
In 1992, after Enya gained worldwide commercial success with her albums Watermark (1988) and Shepherd Moons (1991) for Warner Music, Enya was remastered by Arun Chakraverty and redesigned with new artwork designed by Sooky Choi with photography by David Scheinmann. The album was reissued on 16 November 1992 as The Celts by WEA in Europe and Reprise Records in the United States. The Celts outperformed its original sales, reaching a new peak of number 10 on the UK Albums Chart for two weeks from the week of 28 November 1992. It returned to the chart for two separate weeks in 1993, one week in 1996, and six consecutive weeks in 1998. In the United States, the album sold a further one million copies. It contains a new, longer version of the instrumental "Portrait" that is named "Portrait (Out of the Blue)", which was originally released (under the title "Out of the Blue") as the B-side to Enya's 1988 worldwide hit single, "Orinoco Flow". In 2009, The Celts had a limited Japanese reissue on Super High Material CD with "Eclipse" added as a bonus track.

=== Sampling of "Boadicea" ===
"Boadicea" has been sampled by numerous artists. The Fugees sampled it for their song "Ready or Not" on The Score (1996). A lawsuit against the group for copyright infringement was prepared as they had not asked for permission and did not give her credit. On the 1999 album Astronomica by American heavy metal band Crimson Glory, the intro track "March for Glory" is an interpretation of Enya's "Boadicea".

In 2003, R&B artist Mario Winans sampled "Boadicea" for his song "I Don't Wanna Know" and producer P. Diddy personally contacted Enya for permission. Diddy gave Enya 60 percent of the royalties. "Boadicea" was also sampled on the answer song to "I Don't Wanna Know", "You Should Really Know" by the Pirates featuring Shola Ama, Naila Boss and Ishani. "Boadicea" with "Ready or Not" was also sampled by R&B group Nina Sky on their single "Time to Go" featuring rapper Angie Martinez. In 2008, Italian DJ Francesco Zeta sampled "Boadicea" for his song "Fairyland"; he made another version in 2012, subtitled "ReAmp", that also used the hardstyle sample. In 2011, a sample of "Boadicea" was used on "Der erste Winter" by German singer Cassandra Steen for the album Mir so nah. In 2012, hip-hop artist Meek Mill sampled "Boadicea" on his mixtape Dreamchasers 2 on a song named after the Fugees' song, "Ready or Not". In 2015, Masika Kalysha sampled the song on "Hella Hollywood". In 2016, Salvatore Ganacci's song "Dive" sampled "Boadicea", and Enya was credited as a featured artist.

On 22 July 2016, Bosnian-Swedish DJ Salvatore Ganacci released the single "Dive", which heavily samples "Boadicea" and features vocals from Alex Aris. The single peaked number 14 on the US Billboard Dance/Electronic Digital Songs Sales chart. On Nigerian-American singer Rotimi's 2019 album The Beauty of Becoming, he sampled the song on a track entitled "In My Bed", which also features the rapper Wale. In 2022, "Boadicea" was used in "Creepin'" by American record producer Metro Boomin, Canadian singer the Weeknd, and Atlanta-based rapper 21 Savage; the song in itself being a remake of Winans' aforementioned "I Don't Wanna Know". Also in 2022, "Boadicea" was also used in "Enjoy That" by American singer Akon.

The song is used in the Stephen King film Sleepwalkers and was featured on the soundtrack for the 2024 film The Crow.

== Music videos ==
Technically, no music videos were released to promote the album. However, two episodes of The Celts featured music video-style interludes featuring Enya performing "I Want Tomorrow" and "Aldebaran". (A music video for "The Celts" would later be produced for the Warner Bros. reissue.)

== Critical reception ==
Professional ratings
Review scores
Source	Rating
AllMusic	3/5 stars
Los Angeles Times	2.5/4 stars
The Rolling Stone Album Guide	3/5 stars

A November 1987 review appeared in Australian newspaper The Age by Mike Daly. He compared the sound of the album to Clannad following their shift in musical style in the early 1980s, "echoing, shimmering vocals and instrumentals". He questioned if it was "a beautiful, melodic example of New Age music, or perhaps New Folk?" Daly continued to pick out "I Want Tomorrow", "The Celts", "The Sun in the Stream", and "To Go Beyond (II)" as highlight tracks.

== Track listing ==
All music composed by Enya; all music arranged by Enya and Nicky Ryan; all lyrics by Roma Ryan, except where noted. The lyrics to "St. Patrick" adapted from the Irish hymn "Deus Meus, Adiuva Me" by Mael Ísu Ua Brolcháin, though it is credited as "Traditional".

Side one
No.	Title	Lyrics	Length
1.	"The Celts"	Enya; Roma Ryan	2:57
2.	"Aldebaran" (Dedicated to Ridley Scott)	Enya; R. Ryan	3:05
3.	"I Want Tomorrow"	R. Ryan	4:02
4.	"March of the Celts"	Enya; R. Ryan	3:17
5.	"Deireadh an Tuath" (Irish for "End of the Tribe")	Enya; R. Ryan	1:44
6.	"The Sun in the Stream"		2:55
7.	"To Go Beyond (I)"		1:21

Side two
No.	Title	Lyrics	Length
8.	"Fairytale"		3:04
9.	"Epona"		1:37
10.	"Triad": a. "St. Patrick"; b. "Cú Chulainn"; c. "Oisin"	Mael Ísu Ua Brolcháin ("St. Patrick")	4:25
11.	"Portrait"		1:23
12.	"Boadicea"		3:32
13.	"Bard Dance"		1:24
14.	"Dan y Dŵr" (Welsh for "Under the Water")	R. Ryan	1:42
15.	"To Go Beyond (II)"		2:59
Total length:			39:36

1992 reissue as The Celts
No.	Title	Length
11.	"Portrait (Out of the Blue)" (extended version)	3:12
12.	"Boadicea"	3:32
13.	"Bard Dance"	1:24
14.	"Dan y Dŵr"	1:42
15.	"To Go Beyond (II)"	2:59
Total length:		41:25

2009 Japanese CD reissue
No.	Title	Length
16.	"Eclipse"	1:33
Total length:		42:31

== Personnel ==
Credits adapted from the album's 1987 and 1992 liner notes.

Musicians

- Enya – vocals, piano, Roland Juno 60, Yamaha DX7, E-mu Emulator II, Kurzweil synthesiser
- Arty McGlynn – electric guitar
- Liam O'Flynn – Uilleann pipes
- Patrick Halling – violin

Production

- Enya – arrangement
- Nicky Ryan – arrangement, production, engineer on "Aldebaran" and "March of the Celts"
- Nigel Read – engineer (all other tracks)
- Mario Moscardini – sleeve design, art direction
- Martyn J. Adleman – photography
- David Scheinmann – photography (1992 reissue)
- Sooky Choi – designer (1992 reissue)
- Arun Chakraverty – mastering (1992 reissue)
- Bruce Talbot – executive producer
- Sam Feldman – remastering at Atlantic Studios, New York City

== Charts ==
=== Weekly charts ===
1987 weekly chart performance for Enya
Chart (1987)	Peak position
UK Albums (Official Charts)	69

1989 weekly chart performance for Enya
Chart (1989)	Peak position
New Zealand Albums (RMNZ)	15

1992–1993 weekly chart performance for The Celts (except where noted)
Chart (1992–1993)	Peak position
Australian Albums (ARIA) Enya	26
Dutch Albums (Album Top 100)	28
European Albums (European Top 100 Albums)	31
German Albums (Offizielle Top 100)	70
Norwegian Albums (VG-lista)	20
Swedish Albums (Sverigetopplistan)	39
UK Albums (OCC)	10
US Catalog Albums (Billboard) Enya	11
US New Age Albums (Billboard) Enya	14

1995 weekly chart performance for The Celts
Chart (1995)	Peak position
Australian Albums (ARIA)	7
New Zealand Albums (RMNZ)	7
US Catalog Albums (Billboard)	6

2005 weekly chart performance for The Celts
Chart (2005)	Peak position
Spanish Albums (Promusicae)	97

=== Year-end charts ===
1992 year-end chart performance for The Celts
Chart (1992)	Position
UK Albums (OCC)	80

1995 year-end chart performance for The Celts
Chart (1995)	Position
Australian Albums (ARIA)	28

1997 year-end chart performance for The Celts
Chart (1997)	Position
US New Age Catalog Albums (Billboard)	3

2002 year-end chart performance for The Celts
Chart (2002)	Position
Canadian Alternative Albums (Nielsen SoundScan)	95

== Certifications ==
Certifications and sales for Enya
Region	Certification	Certified units/sales
Australia (ARIA)	Platinum	70,000^{^}
United States (RIAA)	Platinum	1,000,000^{^}
Summaries
Worldwide	—	4,000,000
^{^} Shipments figures based on certification alone.

Certifications and sales for The Celts
Region	Certification	Certified units/sales
Argentina (CAPIF)	Gold	30,000^{^}
Australia (ARIA)	2× Platinum	140,000^{^}
Brazil (Pro-Música Brasil)	Platinum	250,000^{*}
Germany (BVMI)	Gold	250,000^{^}
Japan (RIAJ)	Gold	100,000^{^}
New Zealand (RMNZ)	Gold	7,500^{^}
Spain (Promusicae)	Gold	50,000^{^}
United Kingdom (BPI)	Platinum	300,000^{^}
United States (RIAA)	Platinum	1,000,000^{^}
Summaries
Worldwide	—	4,500,000
^{*} Sales figures based on certification alone.^{^} Shipments figures based on certification alone.
