= Mael Ísu Ua Brolcháin =

Irish churchman and writer

Mael Ísu Ua Brolcháin (died 1086) was an Irish churchman and writer.

== Biography ==
A member of a high-class ecclesiastical family in what is now County Donegal, "genealogical sources give his father as Máel Brigte and his three brothers as Áed, Diarmait, and Muirecan."

Besides holding a number of benefices and wielding considerable political influence, he was the author of the poem To an Elderly Virgin. He died as a member of the religious community of Armagh in 1086, recorded as being the chief sage of Ireland.

Members of his lineage served as Bishop of Derry.

== Works ==
His most prominent work is a Latin and Irish hymn, Deus Meus Adiuva Me.

The piece has been translated by scholars including Gerard Murphy and continues to be performed in its modern Irish form.

Lyrics:

Deus meus adiuva me
Tabhair dom do shearch, a Mhic ghil Dé
Tabhair dom do shearch, a Mhic ghil Dé
Deus meus adiuva me.

Domine da quod peto a te,
Tabhair dom go dian a ghrian ghlan ghlé,
Tabhair dom go dian a ghrian ghlan ghlé,
Domine da quod peto a te.

Domine, Domine, exaudi me,
M’anam bheith lán de d’ghrá, a Dhé,
M’anam bheith lán de d’ghrá, a Dhé,
Domine, Domine exaudi me.

== Sources ==
- pp. 48–50; 396, The New Oxford Book of Irish Verse, edited, with translations, by Thomas Kinsella, 1986.
