= Only If (video game) =

2014 video game

- Developer: Creability
- Publisher: Creability
- Director: Tarek Ghandour
- Composer: Steven O'Brien
- Engine: Unity
- Platforms: Linux, OS X, Windows
- Release: July 25, 2014
- Genre: Adventure
- Mode: Single-player

Only If is an adventure game developed and published by now defunct Dubai-based indie studio Creability. Only If was released on July 25, 2014 for Linux, OS X, and Windows.

== Gameplay ==
Only If is a first person exploration game set at modern times and provides a level based progression, from rooms to parks. It takes elements from escape room games, includes slight puzzles, and random experimental features. The gameplay changes per 'level', moving the player character or interacting with objects is the only repeating gameplay.

== Plot ==
After a heavy night of partying at his crush's house, Anthony Clyde wakes up to find himself in an unfamiliar room. As he attempts to escape, an angry voice from a telecommunication device, "Vinny", yells insults and hints into him about how he could leave the house, however, Anthony becomes concerned about his crush's safety and attempts to rescue her. The scenes switch from rooms to parks, ending with fantasy environments. This is due to Vinny drugging Anthony from the start. After catching up Vinny, he reveals that Anthony's crush is his sister and that he was trying to keep Anthony away from her. Anthony exits the house by jumping out the window.

== Reception ==
The game has been critiqued for its graphics, creativity, poor story and gameplay execution. It received mixed reviews with GameSpot giving it a 2/10 as a lowest rating, and Hardcore Gamer giving it a 3/5 as its highest. "It will cost a couple hours of your life to finish Only If, and that price is too high for the few fleeting, interesting concepts buried in the wreckage", said Game Informer, who gave it a 5/10. It has a score of 39 on Metacritic. Only If accumulated 500,000 downloads within its first 4 months and reached a million units by the summer of 2015.
