= Only Time =

2000 single by Enya

Single by Enya

from the album A Day Without Rain
- B-side: "The First of Autumn"; "The Promise"; "Oíche Chiúin"; "Willows on the Water"
- Released: 6 November 2000
- Studio: Aigle (Dún Laoghaire, Ireland)
- Genre: New-age
- Length: 3:38 (album version); 3:15 (S.A.F. pop radio remix)
- Label: WEA; Reprise
- Composer: Enya
- Lyricist: Roma Ryan
- Producer: Nicky Ryan

Enya singles chronology
"Only If..." (1997)	"Only Time" (2000)	"Wild Child" (2001)

Music video
- "Only Time" on YouTube

"Only Time" is a song by Irish musician Enya. It was released on 6 November 2000 as the lead single from her fifth studio album, A Day Without Rain (2000). The song reached number one in Canada, Germany, Poland and Switzerland, number two in Austria, and became Enya's only top-10 single as a solo artist in the United States, peaking at number 10 on the Billboard Hot 100. It became an anthem for the victims of the September 11th attacks, with Enya donating to a fund for the victims' families.

== Release ==
In 2001, "Only Time" was released again as a radio remix. The track was remixed and mastered by the Swiss American Federation (S.A.F. aka Christian B. and Marc Dold) with a final mix by Enya's producer, Nicky Ryan. Enya donated the earnings from the sale of that single to the Widows' and Children's Fund of the Uniformed Firefighters Association to help the families of firefighters in the aftermath of the September 11th attacks. Following the attacks, sales of the album and its lead single, "Only Time", skyrocketed after it was used by several radio and television networks in their coverage and aftermath of the attacks. As a result, "Only Time", (the S.A.F. radio remix) climbed to number 10 on the Billboard Hot 100 singles chart and number one on the adult contemporary chart. In 2002, the song received an ECHO Award for Best Single.

== Music video ==
The song's music video, which shows Enya performing the song in a spring, summer, fall and winter theme, was directed by Graham Fink. It was released in 2000. In March 2020, to celebrate the 20th anniversary of the recording, the video was remastered in 4K.

== Live performances ==
Enya performed "Only Time" several times, performances included Larry King Live, Children in Need, This Morning, The View, Happy Xmas Show, Entertainment Tonight, Live! with Regis and Kelly, The Tonight Show with Jay Leno and 2001 World Music Awards.

== Track listings ==
UK CD and cassette single (2000)

1. "Only Time"
2. "The First of Autumn"
3. "The Promise"

German CD single (2000)

1. "Only Time"
2. "The First of Autumn"

Remix CD single (2001)

1. "Only Time" (remix)
2. "Oíche Chiúin (Silent Night)"
3. "Willows on the Water"
4. "Only Time" (original version)

European CD single (2001)

1. "Only Time" (remix) – 3:14
2. "Only Time" (original version) – 3:38

US CD single (2001)

1. "Only Time" (remix) – 3:13
2. "Oíche Chiúin (Silent Night)" – 3:45
3. "Willows on the Water" – 3:02

US 7-inch single (2001)

A. "Only Time" (remix) – 3:13
B. "May It Be" (edit) – 3:30

== Credits and personnel ==
Credits are lifted from the A Day Without Rain album booklet.

Studio

- Recorded at Aigle Studio (Dún Laoghaire, Ireland)
- Mastered at 360 Mastering (London, England)

Personnel

- Enya – composition, all instruments and voices, arrangement, mixing
- Roma Ryan – lyrics
- Wired Strings – additional strings
- Nicky Ryan – production, arrangement, mixing, engineering
- Dick Beetham – mastering

== Charts ==
=== Weekly charts ===
2000–2002 weekly chart performance for "Only Time"
Chart (2000–2002)	Peak position
Australia (ARIA)	69
Austria (Ö3 Austria Top 40)	2
Belgium (Ultratip Bubbling Under Wallonia)	11
Canada (Nielsen SoundScan)	1
Canada AC (Nielsen BDS)	3
Canada CHR (Nielsen BDS)	8
Europe (Eurochart Hot 100)	5
France (SNEP)	51
Germany (GfK)	1
Italy (FIMI)	17
Netherlands (Single Top 100)	44
Poland Airplay (Music & Media)	1
Poland (Nielsen Music Control)	1
Scottish Singles Sales (Official Charts)	38
Sweden (Sverigetopplistan)	28
Switzerland (Schweizer Hitparade)	1
UK Singles (Official Charts)	32
US Billboard Hot 100	10
US Adult Contemporary (Billboard)	1
US Adult Pop Airplay (Billboard)	1
US Pop Airplay (Billboard)	11

2010 weekly chart performance for "Only Time"
Chart (2010)	Peak position
US Top New Age Digital Tracks (Billboard)	1

2013 weekly chart performance for "Only Time"
Chart (2013)	Peak position
France (SNEP)	92
Hungary (Single Top 40)	10
Ireland (IRMA)	58
US Billboard Hot 100	43

=== Year-end charts ===
2001 year-end chart performance for "Only Time"
Chart (2001)	Position
Austria (Ö3 Austria Top 40)	9
Canada (Nielsen SoundScan)	25
Canada Radio (Nielsen BDS)	9
Europe (Eurochart Hot 100)	50
Germany (Media Control)	2
Switzerland (Schweizer Hitparade)	8
US Billboard Hot 100	59
US Adult Contemporary (Billboard)	6
US Adult Top 40 (Billboard)	27
US Mainstream Top 40 (Billboard)	62

2002 year-end chart performance for "Only Time"
Chart (2002)	Position
Canada (Nielsen SoundScan)	21
Canada Radio (Nielsen BDS)	39
Switzerland (Schweizer Hitparade)	97
US Adult Contemporary (Billboard)	9
US Adult Top 40 (Billboard)	24

=== Decade-end charts ===
Decade-end chart performance for "Only Time"
Chart (2000–2009)	Position
Austria (Ö3 Austria Top 40)	36
Germany (Media Control GfK)	99

== Certifications ==
Certifications and sales for "Only Time"
Region	Certification	Certified units/sales
Austria (IFPI Austria)	Gold	25,000^{*}
Denmark (IFPI Danmark)	Gold	45,000^{‡}
Germany (BVMI)	3× Gold	750,000^{^}
Italy (FIMI) sales since 2009	Gold	25,000^{‡}
New Zealand (RMNZ)	Platinum	30,000^{‡}
Spain (Promusicae)	Platinum	60,000^{‡}
Switzerland (IFPI Switzerland)	Gold	25,000^{^}
United Kingdom (BPI)	Gold	400,000^{‡}
^{*} Sales figures based on certification alone.^{^} Shipments figures based on certification alone.^{‡} Sales+streaming figures based on certification alone.

== Release history ==
Release dates and formats for "Only Time"
Region	Version	Date	Format(s)	Label(s)	Ref(s).
United States	Original	6 November 2000	Smooth jazz radio	Reprise	
United Kingdom	Original	13 November 2000	CD; cassette	WEA	
Canada	Original	14 November 2000	CD	WEA	
Japan	Original	15 November 2000	CD	WEA	
United States	Original	20 November 2000	Adult contemporary; hot adult contemporary radio	Reprise	
United States	Original	19 June 2001	Contemporary hit radio	Reprise	
Canada	Remix	4 December 2001	CD	WEA	
Australia	Original	10 December 2001	CD	WEA	
Japan	Remix	19 December 2001	CD	WEA	

== In popular culture ==
This song was featured in the 2001 film Sweet November.

In the 2002 Friends episode "The One Where Chandler Takes a Bath", Chandler plays the song while taking a bath.

In the 2006 Less than Perfect episode "Why Are You Hurting Claude", Claudia "Claude" Casey sings the song to Kipp Stedman, who was depressed after losing his trust fund, to provide moral support, and then he sings along to Claude.

On 13 November 2013, The Epic Split advertisement was launched for the Volvo Trucks Volvo FM range and featured the song and Jean-Claude Van Damme. The success of the ad caused "Only Time" to re-enter the Billboard Hot 100 at number 43, and the UK Singles Chart at number 95. Kraft Foods later used the song in advertisements showing parents relaxing while their kids eat Kraft Macaroni & Cheese.

The song was featured in the 2018 Marvel film Deadpool 2, as well as the 2022 Marvel film Thor: Love and Thunder. The song is also played in goal reviews of all Dallas Stars home games at the American Airlines Center.

The song was used in Akiva Schaffer's 2025 legacy sequel The Naked Gun. Frank Debin Jr. reverses the P.L.O.T. device's output, causing everyone in the world to love and respect each other as the music plays.

== See also ==
- List of Billboard Adult Contemporary number ones of 2001
