= Brody Neuenschwander =

American calligrapher and artist (born 1958)

- Born: 1958 (age 66–67); Houston, Texas
- Education: A.B., Princeton University, 1981; PhD, Courtauld Institute, 1986; Roehampton Institute
- Occupation(s): Calligrapher, artist
- Known for: Prospero's Books (1991); The Pillow Book (1996); Casanova (2005)

Brody Neuenschwander (born 1958) is a calligrapher and artist who lives in Bruges, Belgium.

== Education ==
Neuenschwander was educated at Princeton University where he received his B.A. in Art History in 1981. While a student at Princeton, he was appointed a University Scholar. He went on to complete a doctorate in 1986 at the Courtauld Institute of Art in London. His PhD thesis was on the methodology of German art historical practices. He graduated with distinction from the Roehampton Institute of Calligraphy in 1985.

== Biography ==
Neuenschwander was born in Houston, Texas, and currently lives and works in Bruges, Belgium. Following graduate school, he entered his professional career working as an assistant to the English calligrapher Donald Jackson.

He has collaborated with the filmmaker Peter Greenaway on numerous films, operas and television projects. He worked together with Greenaway on Prospero's Books, The Pillow Book, Writing to Vermeer and others.

Neuenschwander taught at the Museum of Fine Arts, Boston in 2004. During this time he developed research into the origins of text-based visual art. He has translated many writings of Hans-Joachim Burgert, a German theoretician and calligrapher. His work has been included in the International Exhibition of Calligraphy. Burgert's theories about world calligraphy influenced Neuenschwander's interest in Arabic and Chinese calligraphy. His work is the subject of a monograph, Textasy: The Work of Brody Neuenschwander. Neuenschwander has also created calligraphic installations.

== Exhibitions ==
Neuenschwander has shown his work at the Museum Correr Fondazione Musei Civici di Venezia, the Contemporary Museum of Calligraphy in Moscow, among other venues.

== Collections ==
Neuenschwander's work is in the permanent collection of the Berlin Calligraphy Collection of the Akademie der Kunste.
