= Hans-Joachim Burgert =

German calligrapher (1928–2009)

- Born: 1928; Berlin, Germany
- Died: 30 January 2009 (aged 80); Berlin, Germany
- Education: Hochschule Bildende Künste
- Occupations: Calligrapher, sculptor, educator
- Known for: The Calligraphic Line

Hans-Joachim Burgert (1928–2009) was a calligrapher, sculptor, and educator.

== Work ==
Burgert was instrumental in the foundation of the Berlin Calligraphy Collection at the Akademie der Künste. He donated seventy works to begin the collection. The works of Burgert, Friedrich Poppl, and Werner Schneider are considered the core of the Berlin Calligraphy Collection.

In addition to the Berlin Calligraphy Collection, Burgert's work is included in the collection of the Cooper Hewitt.

1980 he was awarded an award by the Hakone Museum, Japan.

== Family ==
Burgert was married to Benita (née von Hennigs) and was the father of two sons, including the artist Jonas Burgert.
