= Aileron (architecture) =

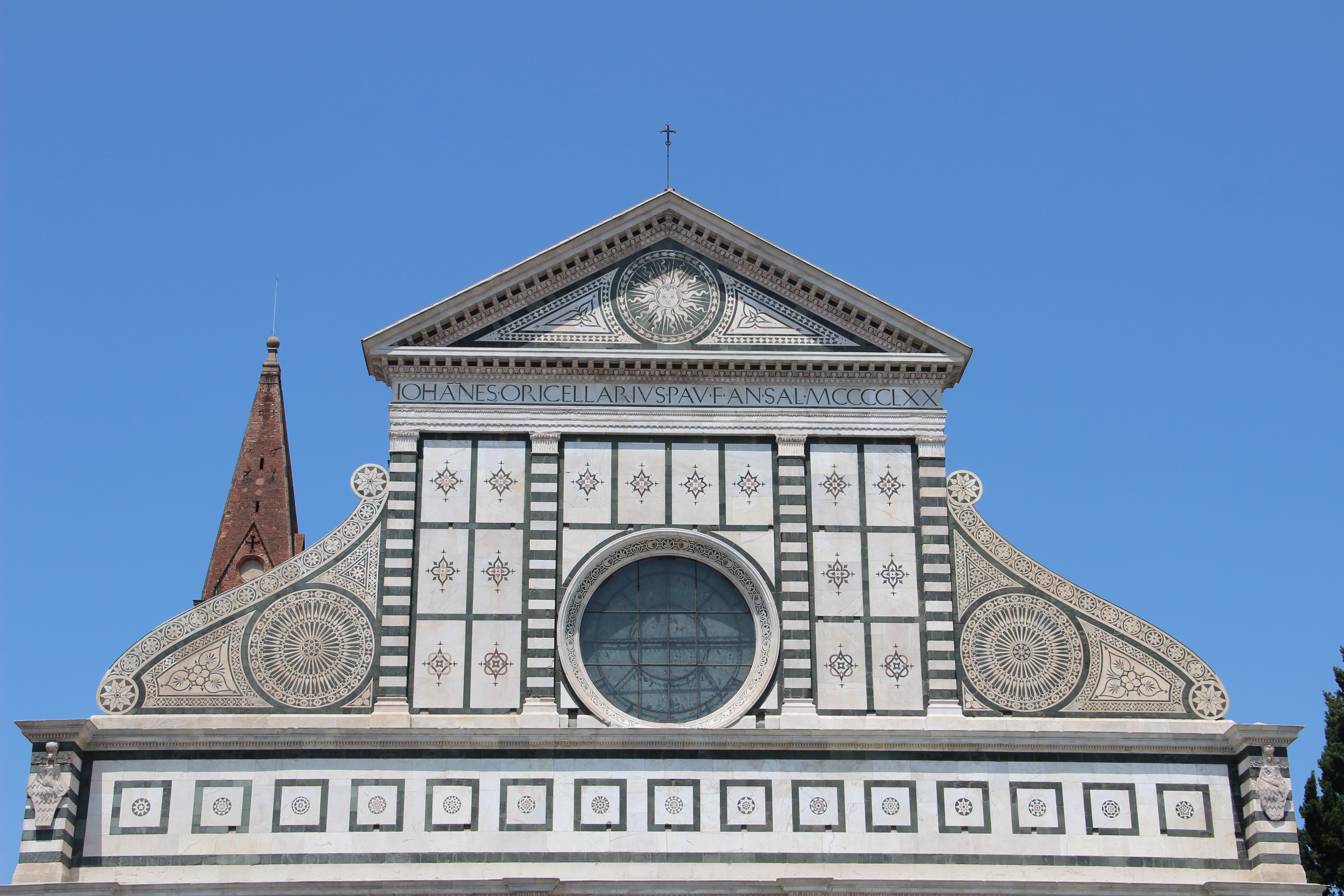
The ailerons at Florence's Santa Maria Novella are concealed by scrolls

An aileron in architecture is a half-gable, typically found in pairs flanking a central mass over subsidiary elements. In churches they are typically found at side aisles or wings (French aile). In baroque architecture, ailerons are often altered or disguised with scrolled or curved elements of the facade.
