= Only If... =

1997 single by Enya

Single by Enya

from the album Paint the Sky with Stars
- B-side: "Willows on the Water"; "Oíche Chiún (Silent Night)"
- Released: 10 November 1997
- Length: 3:18
- Label: WEA; Reprise
- Songwriters: Enya; Roma Ryan
- Producer: Nicky Ryan

Enya singles chronology
"On My Way Home" (1996)	"Only If..." (1997)	"Only Time" (2000)

Music video
- "Only If" on YouTube

"Only If..." is a song by Irish singer-songwriter Enya, released on 10 November 1997 as the first single from her first greatest hits compilation, Paint the Sky with Stars (1997). The song charted in several countries, and its accompanying music video was noted for its creative direction. Enya promoted the song with interviews and performances on The Rosie O'Donnell Show, Late Show with David Letterman and Royal Variety Performance.

== Critical reception ==
Larry Flick from Billboard magazine wrote, "Enya delivers yet another great single. 'Only If' is as peaceful and memorably melodic as any other of her inspirational, soul-purifying songs, which traditionally are etched with a unique combination of background voices with drums and violin lines. It's a combination that makes all her songs seem antique, almost, if not angelic. Enya can many times take her listeners into another dimension altogether, and this single is a fine example of that." British magazine Music Week gave the song three out of five, noting that it "is the closest Enya has come to a traditional pop arrangement, though the trademark orchestral layers and oceanic sonics are still in place."

== Track listings ==
UK and US CD single; US cassette single
No.	Title	Length
1.	"Only If..."	3:18
2.	"Willows on the Water"	3:02
3.	"Oíche Chiún (Silent Night)"	3:45

UK cassette single and US 7-inch single
No.	Title	Length
1.	"Only If..."	3:18
2.	"Oíche Chiún (Silent Night)"	3:45

== Charts ==
Weekly chart performance for "Only If..."
Chart (1997–1998)	Peak position
Australia (ARIA)	94
Belgium (Ultratip Bubbling Under Flanders)	16
Finland (Suomen virallinen lista)	23
Germany (GfK)	68
Iceland (Íslenski Listinn Topp 40)	30
Italy Airplay (Music & Media)	6
Netherlands (Dutch Tipparade 40)	19
Netherlands (Single Top 100)	78
Poland Airplay (Music & Media)	4
Scottish Singles Sales (Official Charts)	44
UK Singles (Official Charts)	43
US Billboard Hot 100	88

== Release history ==
Release dates and formats for "Only If..."
Region	Date	Format(s)	Label(s)	Ref.
Europe	10 November 1997	CD	WEA	
Japan	25 November 1997	CD	WEA	
