= Graham Fink =

- Born: London, England
- Occupation: Multimedia artist

Graham Fink is a British multimedia artist.

Fink was Chief Creative Officer at the advertising agency Ogilvy & Mather in China. Before taking up that appointment in April 2011, he was Executive Creative Director at M&C Saatchi in London. In 1995, he began directing television commercials and music videos at the Paul Weiland film company. Previously, he was Deputy Creative Director at the Gold Greenlees Trott, and Group Head at Saatchi & Saatchi and WCRS. Before that he was an Art Director at CDP. His first job in advertising was as Art Director at Medcalf, Wrightson, Lovelock. All five companies are or were London advertising agencies.

He became the youngest ever President of D&AD (Design and Art Directors Association) in 1996. He was subsequently voted into D&AD's 'Art Direction book' representing the top 28 Art Directors of all time.

He has won awards at Cannes, D&AD, One Show, BAFTA, Clio's, LIAA, BTAA, Campaign's UK Big Awards, Creative Circle, Mobius, Eurobest, EPICA, New York Festival, China 4A's, Longxi, SPIKES. In 2011, he won the UK Creative Circle President's Award, and in 2012, he won Ogilvy Asia's first ever Cannes Grand Prix.

His award-winning photography has been used in many advertising campaigns, including PlayStation's 'Blood' and 'Mental Wealth' poster campaigns. He also directed a short film (Z) for the Millennium, commissioned by David Puttnam which was shortlisted at BAFTA.

In 2001 he created thefinktank, a conceptual production company and theartschool (which was dubbed Britain's most radical art school). In 2005 he was awarded an Honorary Doctorate at Bucks New University

In 2014 he had his first one-man exhibition at London's Riflemaker gallery called NOMADS. In 2015 he had his second exhibition in London entitled Drawing with my eyes. For this he drew directly onto a screen using only his eyes via a Tobii eye tracker and software he developed with Tobii.
