= Rob Dickins =

British music industry executive (born 1950)

Rob Dickins CBE (born July 1950, East Ham, London) is a British music industry executive, who currently holds a number of trustee and consultant positions in music and the arts in the United Kingdom. Dickins began his music industry career at Warner Music UK.

== Early life and education ==
Dickins grew up in East Ham and in the surrounding suburbs. His father Percy was a saxophonist and pianist and one of the founders of the NME, who started the first British Record Charts at the paper in November 1952. He attended Ilford County High School for Boys, before going on to Loughborough University, graduating with an undergraduate degree in Politics, Sociology, and Russian. While at university, Dickins was chair of the Folk Club, the Film Society, and the Entertainments Committee. He also served as Social Secretary of the Students Union.

== Career ==
=== Warner ===
After graduating in 1971, Dickins joined Warner Bros Music Publishing and was appointed Managing Director in 1974, and International Vice President of the company in 1979. His UK signings included Prince, Nile Rodgers & Bernard Edwards (Chic), Neil Young, and Joni Mitchell, and his signings for the World company included Vangelis, Sex Pistols, Whitesnake and Madness.

In 1983, Dickins became the Chairman of Warner Music UK (a division of Warner Music Group), and remained in that role until December 1998. During his time there, the company became one of the most profitable in the UK.

His first signing, Howard Jones, sold 4 million records, whilst US artists such as Prince, Foreigner, ZZ Top, and Madonna also contributed to the Warner recovery. Artists such as Tracy Chapman, Paul Simon's Graceland, R.E.M. and Alanis Morissette broke first in the UK, resulting in multi-million albums. He brought Seal, Simply Red, Vangelis, Mike Oldfield, Enya, and Cher to the UK label, and in 1997-98 Warner added Mark Morrison, Shola Ama, Catatonia, and Cleopatra to the UK roster. Dickins also acquired the recording catalogues of The Smiths and The Pogues for Warners.

Dickins worked closely with Enya, and was involved in the studio recording process. He worked on art direction for five album sleeves and most of her music videos. He is mentioned in the lyrics of Enya's hit "Orinoco Flow": "We can steer we can near with Rob Dickins at the wheel." He signed William Orbit as an artist, introducing him to Madonna with a re-mix of "Justify My Love" in the early 1990s. Orbit went on to produce and co-write the Madonna album Ray of Light.

Dickins constructed Cher's song "Believe" with six songwriters (who never actually met each other until the award ceremonies that followed), leading to a front cover article about him in The New York Times Arts and Living section.

Dickins also worked with other Warner acts such as Rod Stewart, on singles such as "Downtown Train" and Rhythm of My Heart", and The Corrs on their album Talk on Corners.

Dickins oversaw the creation of a classical record division, with a repertoire of works by composers such as Nikolaus Harnoncourt, Daniel Barenboim and José Carreras. He was also behind the William Orbit classical crossover album, Pieces in a Modern Style. The label had crossover success with Górecki's Third Symphony, The Three Tenors in Los Angeles, and Agnus Dei (The Choir of New College, Oxford).

=== Instant Karma and Dharma Music ===
In 1999, Dickins set up his own entertainment company with Sony Music, Instant Karma, based in the West End of London. The company's first album release was How to Steal the World by Helicopter Girl in 2000, and the label also had chart successes with I Monster and The Alice Band in the UK and Addis Black Widow in Scandinavia. In September 2002, Instant Karma became an independent label, and achieved a Top 5 single in January 2003 with "Mundian To Bach Ke" by Panjabi MC.

Dharma Music, his independent music publishing company, released hit singles by Cher, Rod Stewart, Girls Aloud, I Monster, Amici Forever, and Hear'Say's 1.5 million selling UK No. 1, Pure and Simple. Dharma copyrights have been used in major advertising campaigns and TV and movie soundtracks, such as the title music for Shaun of the Dead.

== Arts appointments ==
In July 2000, Dickins was appointed as a trustee of the Victoria and Albert Museum, where he also is a director of V&A Enterprises, the museum's commercial arm. Dickins was re-appointed as a trustee of the museum in October 2004 for a further three years. He was a founding trustee of Youth Music, a charitable foundation which helps provide access to music-making for young people, particularly in socially deprived areas. This foundation received a £1.3 million contribution from the BRIT Trust due to Dickins' participation in the Abbamania fund-raising project. In July 2002 Dickins was appointed chair of the V&A Museum of Childhood in Bethnal Green.

Within the music industry Dickins has chaired the PR Committee and the Brit Awards Committee. He also served on the council of the British Phonographic Industry (BPI) from 1983 to 2002, and was chair of the council from 1986 to 1988, dealing with the 1988 Copyright Act. During this period the Brit School of Performing Arts was initiated. He became chair of the council again in 1997 and in 1999. He agreed to a fourth period as chair of the BPI (2000–2002), the first person to hold the post four times. He is a trustee of the Brit Trust, the record industry's charitable organisation. In 1999, Dickins was elected Chairman of the BPI Classical Committee. He simplified the classical charts, and organised the inaugural Classical Brit Awards TV show.

In 1999, Dickins accompanied Chris Smith, the Secretary of State for Culture, Media, and Sport, on a fact-finding tour of China.

In 2004, Dickins became a Trustee of the Watts Gallery in Surrey, an organisation dedicated to preserving the heritage of Victorian artist and social campaigner George Frederic Watts. He donated his collection of books, letters, and Victorian photographs to the gallery; 200 of his collection of "Victorian Artists in Photographs" was exhibited at Watts Gallery, Guildhall Art Gallery in London, Mercer Art Gallery in Harrogate, and the Forbes Galleries in New York.

In October 2007 Dickins was appointed consultant to the British Music Experience museum at The O2 (London).

In 2009, he became chairman of The Theatres Trust, the national public advisory body for theatres. The same year he sat on the Conservative Party's Creative Industries Advisory Board and delivered a paper on Skills and Education co-authored with Double Negative's Alex Hope. In 2013 he was selected to be on the Culture Minister Ed Vaizey's Arts Advisory Board.

In February 2012 he was appointed trustee of The Julia Margaret Cameron Trust at Dimbola, Isle of Wight. In October 2012 he was appointed trustee at the Handel House Museum in Brook Street, London.

In 2016 he was appointed as trustee to the board of the National Portrait Gallery by the Prime Minister.

== Honours ==
In the 2002 Birthday Honours Dickins was appointed a Commander of the British Empire for services to the music industry, and on 15 July 2002 he received an Honorary Doctorate from his alma mater Loughborough University.

In October the following year he was the recipient of the 2003 Music Industry Trusts Award in recognition of his role as "talent finder extraordinaire".

In 2005, Dickins was conferred as visiting professor in music and popular culture at the University of the Arts London. He was appointed a Fellow of The Royal Society for the encouragement of Arts, Manufactures and Commerce in March 2007. His second visiting professorship was confirmed in June of the same year in music and media management at London Metropolitan University.

In July 2014 he was awarded an honorary doctorate from University of the Arts, London and gave a commencement speech at the Royal Festival Hall. In July 2015 he was awarded an honorary doctorate from London Metropolitan University and gave a commencement speech at the Barbican Theatre.
