= The Ailerons =

English rock band in 2006

Background information
- Origin: London, England
- Genres: Indie rock
- Years active: 2005–2006
- Spinoff of: Blur
- Past members: Charity Hair; Dan Beattle; Dave Rowntree; Grog Prebble; Mike Smith
- Website: theailerons.com

The Ailerons were an English indie rock band featuring Charity Hair, Daniel Beattie, Dave Rowntree, Grog Prebble and Mike Smith.

== History ==
The Ailerons were formed in 2005 by former Blur drummer Dave Rowntree, Blur/Gorillaz’s occasional touring keyboardist Mike Smith, guitarist Dan Beattie, as well as Grog and Charity Hair on bass and vocals respectively. They released only one project, their four-track EP Left Right, described by Blur biographer Martin Power as a "delightful assortment of sci-fi keyboards, weird film samples and screeching guitars", and deeming the chorus of one of its songs, "Dig A Hole", to be "as catchy as anything that had escaped Blur’s clutches in recent years". The song was featured as iTunes' free single of the week, released exclusively through iTunes. Charity Hair was later a member of the alternative country band Red Sky July with husband and wife duo Ally McErlaine and Shelly Poole.

== Discography ==
=== EPs ===
==== Left Right (16 October 2006) ====
Track listing:

1. "Dig a Hole" – 2:39
2. "Bonafone" – 3:59
3. "Waking Fever" – 5:04
4. "Roll Over" – 2:45
