= Watermark (Enya album) =

Studio album by Enya
- Released: 19 September 1988
- Recorded: June 1987 – April 1988
- Studios: Orinoco, London
- Genres: New-age; Celtic; avant-pop; ambient
- Length: 40:05 (1988); 43:06 (1989 and 1991 reissues)
- Labels: WEA (Europe); Geffen; Reprise
- Producers: Nicky Ryan; Ross Cullum; Enya

Enya chronology
| Enya (1987) | Watermark (1988) | Shepherd Moons (1991) |

Singles from Watermark
- 1. "Orinoco Flow" Released: 3 October 1988; 2. "Evening Falls..." Released: 12 December 1988; 3. "Storms in Africa" Released: 5 June 1989; 4. "Exile" Released: 20 May 1991

Watermark is the second studio album by Irish singer and composer Enya, released on 19 September 1988 by WEA. After the release of her previous album Enya (1987), she secured a recording contract with Warner following a chance meeting with chairman Rob Dickins, who had become a fan of her music. Her contract allowed her considerable artistic and creative freedom, with minimal interference from the label and no deadlines. Enya recorded Watermark in ten months with her long-time collaborators: manager, producer and arranger Nicky Ryan and his wife, lyricist Roma Ryan. It was initially recorded in Ireland in demo form before production relocated to London to re-record, mix, and master it digitally. Watermark features music in different styles, displaying Enya's sound of multi-tracked vocals with keyboards, percussion instruments, and elements of Celtic, ambient, and new-age music, though Enya believes her music does not belong in the latter genre.

Watermark initially received mixed reviews from critics and it became an unexpected commercial success, which propelled Enya to worldwide fame. It peaked at number 5 on the UK Albums Chart, number 25 on the Billboard 200 in the United States, and reached number 1 in New Zealand and Switzerland. It was certified quadruple Platinum by the British Phonographic Industry (BPI) and the Recording Industry Association of America (RIAA) for shipments of 1.2 million and 4 million copies across the United Kingdom and the United States, respectively. To promote the album, Enya embarked on a worldwide promotional tour which included interviews, appearances, and live performances. Four singles were released from the album, beginning with the international hit "Orinoco Flow", which spent three weeks at number 1 in the United Kingdom. Watermark was reissued in 1989, 1991 and 2009; the first two contain "Storms in Africa (Part II)" as a bonus track; the latter was a Japanese release with a second bonus track titled "Morning Glory".

== Background ==
In March 1987, then 25-year-old Enya released her self-titled debut solo album Enya on BBC Records in the United Kingdom and on Atlantic Records in the United States. It was originally produced as the soundtrack to the BBC2 documentary series The Celts, with Enya and her recording partners of five years, manager, arranger and producer Nicky Ryan and his wife, lyricist Roma Ryan. It was a mild commercial success, peaking at number 69 in the United Kingdom. Soon after its release Rob Dickins, then chairman of Warner Music UK, became a fan of the album, playing it "every night before I went to bed". Weeks later, he met Enya and the Ryans at a chance meeting at the year's Irish Recorded Music Association Awards in Dublin where Dickins learned Enya was considering signing with a rival label, prompting him to attract her to Warner. After a period of negotiations, Dickins signed Enya, granting her wish for complete artistic freedom without interference from management or deadlines to have albums finished. Dickins later said, "Sometimes you sign an act to make money, and sometimes you sign an act to make music. This was clearly the latter ... I just wanted to be involved with this music." In the process, Enya departed from Atlantic and signed to the Warner-led Geffen Records to handle distribution in North America.

== Recording ==
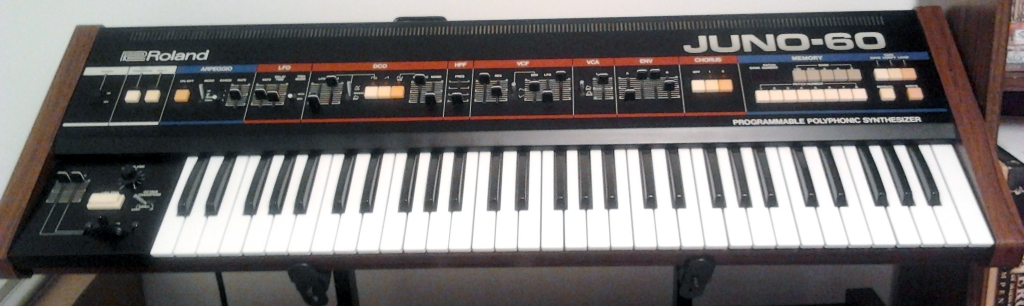
The Roland Juno-60, a favourite keyboard of Enya's that she used on Watermark. In 1989, she said: "We wouldn't part with it for anything in the world".

With the green-light to make a new album, Enya recorded Watermark from June 1987 to April 1988. It was initially recorded in demo form at Aigle Studio, a 16-track facility located in the basement of the Ryans' home, then located in Artane, a northern suburb of Dublin. Nicky operated a Fostex E16 tape machine with KEF and Yamaha NS-10M speakers for monitoring, two Alesis MIDIverb II models, an ATC Q1 for reverb, and a Roland SDE-1000 Digital Delay for delay. He made a conscious effort not to incorporate audio compression as he wished to make the music sound satisfactory "at the recording end". Enya wrote and recorded the album without the use of a click track to retain a more natural feel to the music. Enya played a variety of keyboards and synthesisers, including the Yamaha KX88 master keyboard, Yamaha TX802, Oberheim Matrix-6R, Akai S900, Roland D-50, Roland Juno-60 and PPG Wave. The Juno-60 was a particular favourite of hers. Prior to recording the album, she had intended to replace its parts with better sounds but could not find better substitutes, so they were left in.

After a demo version of the album was put down, Dickins requested to have it re-recorded digitally at a more professional studio as the analogue equipment at Aigle had created an abundance of tape hiss, causing the music to suffer. Nicky found the quality of Enya's multi-track vocals had also diminished, leaving them the only option of re-recording them, though he later found the digital recording had lost "warmth in the bottom end". Recording took place at Orinoco Studios in Bermondsey, London and lasted for two months with Ross Cullum who carried out co-production, engineering, and mixing duties. "Storms in Africa" and "Orinoco Flow" were completed on the studio's two Mitsubishi 32-track recording machines. Away from the "intimate and personal" setting of their home studio, Enya found working in London more difficult as the busy city caused many distractions. Nicky said the studio was designed "in a completely mad way", which he and Enya found more attractive to work in. During the final stages of recording, Enya tripped on a step, which resulted in two cuts to her knee. She continued to work, "taking these heavy pain-killers, sitting at the desk, in the studio with one foot propped up on cushions." Cullum completed the majority of the album's mixing at Wessex Sound Studios; Jim Barton was the mixer on "Orinoco Flow".

Watermark firmly established Enya's sound of multi-layered vocals, keyboard-oriented songs, and influences of Celtic music. Enya felt the need to have layers of vocals to add a "human element" to her music as solely using keyboards and digital sampling sounded, to her, "a bit linear and straight". The idea of the multi-vocals originated when Enya was a member of Clannad, her family's Celtic band, in the early 1980s. With Nicky as their manager, influenced by The Beach Boys and the "wall of sound" technique made famous by producer Phil Spector, the two often discussed the idea of layering Enya's voice to make it its own instrument. After experimenting with the concept on Enya the vocals became more established on Watermark, with as many as over 200 vocal tracks were painstakingly recorded for certain sections. In one instance, around 90 tracks had been put down during a period of several days but the two felt they did not sound right, so they erased them and started over. This was the case particularly during the recording of "Miss Clare Remembers", a piano instrumental, when they experimented with the idea of adding vocals but decided against keeping them.

== Songs ==
"There isn't a category for it."

— Enya on the album's genre, 1989.

Watermark is formed of eleven tracks, eight of which Enya and Roma are listed on as co-writers. The remaining three are instrumentals solely composed by Enya. She had performed solos as a vocal on Enya, but wanted them played by different instruments on Watermark, and employed additional musicians to play parts that were already written: Neil Buckley plays the clarinet on "On Your Shore", Chris Hughes plays the rototoms on "River" and the rototoms and African hand drum on "Storms in Africa", and Davy Spillane contributes the low whistle and uilleann pipes on "Exile" and "Na Laetha Geal M'óige". Enya sings in Irish, her first language, and English and Latin. She looked back on the album in 2000: "Looking back ... the words are those of loss, of reflection, of exile – not necessarily from one's country, but from those whom the heart loves. It has in its theme searching, longing, of reaching out for an answer. The ocean is a central image. It is the symbolism of a great journey."

=== Side one ===
Watermark opens with a same-titled track, a tradition that Enya would adopt on her next three albums. Its title derived from a poem Roma was writing at the time of recording, which inspired her to name the track accordingly. However, the track was kept as an instrumental and the poem was left unused. It was printed for the first time in the liner notes for Enya's 2002 box set, Only Time: The Collection. Enya and Nicky dedicated the track to Bones Howe, an American producer and a friend of Nicky's who was the inspiration behind the only word that Enya sings on the track: "Howe". During a meeting with Enya, Diana, Princess of Wales revealed that "Watermark" was a favourite of hers.

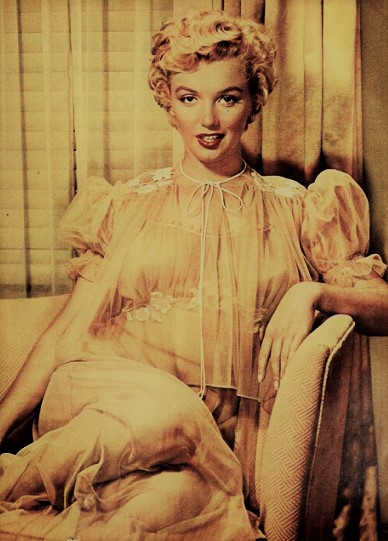
"Cursum Perficio" was inspired by a documentary on Marilyn Monroe.

"Cursum Perficio" came about after Enya and the Ryans had seen a documentary on American actress and model Marilyn Monroe, who once wrote the phrase on the tiles on her front doorstep. It means "My journey ends here" or "I finish the course" in Latin, and Roma completed a set of Latin lyrics based around the phrase. Enya wanted her vocals to be "bold and up-front" like that of a choral piece, and realised early on that translating its lyrics into English or Irish would not complement the music, so Latin was used. Its original title was "Quo Plus".

"On Your Shore" refers to Magheragallon Beach at Enya's hometown of Gweedore, County Donegal that houses a cemetery where her grandparents are buried. Its emotional and personal connection to her childhood inspired her to write it. She explained, "When the first people lived in Gweedore, there was a sort of shelter for the fishermen ... The sea came in when there was a sermon going on and everybody was wiped out. There are a lot of stories like that, where we would start to talk about them and a song would evolve." It was written as an instrumental at first, but Enya and Nicky found lyrics suited the track better. Numerous "vocal experiments" were tried out for it, but neither suited the music, so it took the more simple form of a single lead vocal with one synthesiser. The clarinet solo was originally sung on its demo, but Nicky suggested a clarinet was the most suitable instrument that suited the vocals she used when singing it.

"Storms in Africa" originated from a melody that Enya had played on the Juno-60 after Nicky had preset with a sound using its arpeggiator function and asked her to develop something with it. He returned to the studio several hours later to find Enya had come up with the song's chord sequence, which inspired him to suggest the title. From then on, he helped to "guide its direction" and arrangement. They wanted the song to capture a feeling of unrest, to which Cullum suggested they bring in Hughes to play the rototoms and African hand drums. The track was named after it was recorded. Two versions were recorded with Irish and English lyrics; Roma recalled the Irish version became the favourite to which Enya and Nicky also agreed, which led to its addition on the album. The English version, titled "Storms in Africa (Part II)", became a B-side on the former's single in 1989 and a bonus track on some later pressings of Watermark.

In writing about "Exile" in 2002, Roma believed its theme of loneliness from the separation of one's love is also met with "hope and determination" that they will return. The song was originally recorded with wordless vocals, but Dickins thought it would work better with lyrics, in particular poetry by Wilfred Owen. Roma was familiar with some of Owen's works, and wrote a set of lyrics inspired by their style. Enya and Nicky wished to incorporate the shakuhachi, a Japanese flute, on the track but they could not find a player confident enough. Instead, as Nicky explained, they resorted to hiring "a gypsy guy to play the flute". The vocal version was released as a B-side to Enya's 1992 single "Book of Days", titled "As Baile".

"Miss Clare Remembers" is a reworked version of a same-titled piano instrumental that Enya originally recorded in 1983, her first project as a solo artist. It was released on Touch Travel (1984), an audio cassette of music from various artists. When the track was re-recorded for Watermark, Enya and Nicky toyed with adding vocals and other instruments, but agreed it sounded best as a piano piece. Its title refers to the same-titled book by English novelist Miss Read, whose depictions of country and village life, and the people who lived there, appealed to Enya. Roma thought the piece "recaptures the naivety and innocence of an age and a place far removed from the whirl and pressure of a sophisticated society".

=== Side two ===
"Orinoco Flow" was the final track written for the album, but it was one that Enya recalled was difficult to work on and which involved several breaks from recording before coming back to it several weeks after. She later pointed out the absence of deadlines to complete the album, as granted in her contract with Warner, which allowed the song to be developed over a period of time until "we were able at the end to listen to it and say 'this is good'". It originated from a riff she had developed after Nicky suggested playing a melody in five octaves; they left the arrangement as it was, until they realised the album needed one more track. The song developed around the initial riff, itself becoming part of the chorus hook. An earlier version of the song contained no middle eight and had the line "Sail away..." after every line that Dickins later said "drove me crazy", but recognised its potential if it was worked on. Its pizzicato introduction, which has been compared to Andy Williams' 1963 single "Can't Get Used to Losing You", was the genesis of Roma's inspiration for the song's lyrics after she had heard the introduction as she looked out of the studio window and saw her children skipping. Dickins and Cullum are referenced in the lyrics in the lines: "We can steer, we can near with Rob Dickins at the wheel. We can sigh, say goodbye, Ross and his dependencies", the latter being a reference to the region of Antarctica known as Ross Dependency. Dickins only found out about it after the album had been pressed, which embarrassed him at first, and initially he wanted it changed, but soon warmed to it after the single went to number one. "All these years later", he said, "if I hear that line ... I can't help smiling."

"Evening Falls..." is a track that Roma described as "a song of a spirit travelling". It is based on a ghost story that Roma had heard about a woman who had recurring dreams of a house in America, only to accidentally come across it years later in England. Upon entering the house, its inhabitants become frightened of the woman as they explain she had haunted the house each time she dreamed about it. Nicky thought a melody Enya had written suited the story, which led to Roma writing a lyric inspired by it.

"River" is an instrumental that was named by Nicky after the music conjured the image of a river in his mind. He knew Enya had the final decision over song titles, but she liked his suggestion and went with it. The track was recorded in roughly ten minutes with Enya playing directly to tape. Nicky spoke about Enya's style of composing for song: "There are five synths midi'd but then she plays chords over these random arpeggiators with notes popping in and out where you don't expect them. Somehow she makes that work". A PPG Wave keyboard was used afterwards for additional sounds.

"The Longships" makes reference to the longship war boats used by the Vikings, who invaded Ireland in AD 795 and settled in Dublin by AD 841.

"Na Laetha Geal M'óige", translated from Irish as "The Brighter Days of My Youth", is about the reminiscence of the days during Enya's childhood, and receives a dedication in Irish to her grandparents.

== Artwork ==
The Enya logotype was first used on the front cover of Watermark and later used on the majority of her future albums.

The sleeve to Watermark was illustrated to a design painted by graphic designer Laurence Dunmore. The cover image of Enya was shot by David Hiscook with additional photography by Russel Yamy, with "layers and layers of imagery" hand-drawn on top. Dickins realised its sleeve design was an important aspect in its marketing campaign to ensure the album's success as it was "not the kind of music that slots easily into Radio 1 ... It had to be the kind of sleeve you'd fall in love with ... And I think it works that way – the effect in window displays is stunning." Enya was "very happy" with the cover, calling it "very classic" and "in taste with the music", not portraying her as the latest "girl on the scene" when compared to other female solo artists at the time, such as Madonna and Kylie Minogue. The artwork provided the inspiration to the music video for "Orinoco Flow". Dickins decided against the inclusion of a detailed set of liner notes and lyrics with their translations as it encouraged the listener to conjure up their own images and understanding when they play it, a decision that Enya supported.

== Release and commercial performance ==
To generate interest in the album, Warner organised a private album launch reception at the Serpentine Gallery within Hyde Park and the Westbury Hotel in London, one week prior to its release. Watermark was released on 19 September 1988 in the United Kingdom; its release in the United States followed on 10 January 1989 by Geffen Records The album was a success on the charts, entering the UK Albums Chart at number 46 for the week of 15 October 1988 before a three-week climb to its peak of number five. In its initial run the album spent 54 weeks on the chart, returning each year from 1989 to 1995 for a total 99 weeks. In the United States, it debuted the Billboard 200 chart at number 100, the week of 4 February 1989. The album had a steady climb, and reached its peak at 25 on the week ending 22 April 1989. It was present on the chart for a total of 39 weeks. On the Billboard New Age Albums chart, the album reached its peak position of number two during its 286-week stay. Elsewhere, the album went to number one in New Zealand and Switzerland.

By January 1989, Watermark had sold over 20,000 copies in Ireland and 300,000 copies in the United Kingdom. Five years later, the album was certified quadruple platinum by the British Phonographic Industry (BPI) for shipment of 1.2 million copies. In the United States, Watermark sold 500,000 copies in its first four months of release. After 7 years, the album was certified quadruple platinum by the Recording Industry Association of America (RIAA) for shipment of four million copies. It sold one million copies in the country between March 1995 and March 1996. In November 2008, Billboard reported the album had sold 3,877,571 copies in the United States according to figures tracked by Nielsen SoundScan since 1991. By 1994, the album spent 165 weeks on Spanish charts and sold 300,000 copies in Spain. Worldwide, the album has sold an estimated 8 million copies.

Enya released four singles from Watermark between 1988 and 1991. "Orinoco Flow" was the lead single, released on 3 October 1988 and entered the United Kingdom singles chart at twenty-nine. It climbed to number five in its second week before it reached number one in its third, staying at the top for three consecutive weeks. The single was certified silver by the BPI for 250,000 copies sold in its first month of release. Dickins observed that some of the public were confused on the song's title and were asking shop staff for "Sail Away", so he ordered to have the title changed on subsequent pressings to "Orinoco Flow (Sail Away)". The single became a crossover hit in the United States after the single gained airplay on progressive rock, Top 40, and new age format radio stations. "Evening Falls..." was released on 12 December 1988, and peaked at number three in Ireland and number 20 in the United Kingdom. "Storms in Africa" followed on 5 June 1989, and reached number 12 in Ireland and 41 in the United Kingdom. In 1991, after "Exile" was used on the soundtracks of Green Card (1990) and L.A. Story (1991), it was released as the album's fourth single on 20 May 1991. A music video was produced for each single with Michael Geoghegan as director, and included on the video compilation Moonshadows, released on VHS and LaserDisc by Warner Music Vision and Warner Reprise Video in 1991.

Enya embarked on a worldwide media tour which lasted from September 1988 to May 1989 and included press, radio and television interviews and appearances, record signings, and lip-sync performances of songs from Watermark. Among her performances included "Orinoco Flow" on the British music show Top of the Pops on 19 October 1988, and "Storms in Africa" at the 1989 World Music Awards in Monte Carlo.

At the 32nd Grammy Awards in 1990, "Orinoco Flow" was nominated for Best New Age Performance and Best Music Video.

== Critical reception ==
Professional ratings
Review scores
| Source | Rating |
|---|---|
| AllMusic | 5/5 stars |
| Hot Press | 11/12 |
| Los Angeles Times | 1/5 stars |
| NME | 9/10 |
| Orlando Sentinel | 4/5 stars |
| Philadelphia Daily News | 3/4 stars |
| The Philadelphia Inquirer | 3/4 stars |
| Rolling Stone | 4/5 stars |
| The Rolling Stone Album Guide | 3.5/5 stars |
| The Village Voice | D+ |

Watermark received generally positive reviews from music critics. In an April 1988 review, Hot Press reporter Liam Fay wrote the album is "A lifetime's worth of sights, sounds and experiences condescend into an orderly and lucid aural aquarium". He praised her orchestral-like vocals on "Cursum Perficio", the instrumentation on "Storms in Africa", "The Longships", and "Exile", and the "exquisite liqueous pop" of "Orinoco Flow" which, as he predicted, "should be a hit single". Fay was aware that lyrics in such types of music can be the weak point, but deemed Roma's lyrics are "integral and are ideally sculpted to allow Enya's voice to float between the gaps and pauses". Fay also felt "Na Laetha Geal M'óige", "On Your Shore", and "Evening Falls..." sound "too hymn-like for their own good", and pale in comparison to the rest of the album and Ryan's production "reveals a different hue" each time one listens to it. Joe Brown praised it in The Washington Post, calling it "a lovely collection of quasi-mystical pop" that is "somewhere outside of the pop mainstream but steering clear of the sugary shoals of New Age". He described "Orinoco Flow" as "lushly romantic" and praised the production on "Evening Falls..." and "Miss Clare Remembers", which evoke a "cathedral ambience, with multitracked choirs and shimmering echo".

A review by Bill Henderson was printed in the Orlando Sentinel, with Henderson giving the album four stars out of five and writing: "Delicate. That adjective describes the melodies of Enya" whose "art becomes the sum of its parts – as light as a whisper, yet as strong as a scream". He compared her methods to English singer Claire Hamill but "much better", and praised her personal songs like "On Your Shore" to invite the listener to recall homes of their past, "a bittersweet journey". While the instrumental tracks to him are "simple and pleasant musical ideas", they are overshadowed by her vocal tracks, as "Her singing is so strong that it is painfully obvious when she isn't". He deemed "Na Laetha Geal M'oige" "one of the most beautiful melodies recorded by anyone recently" that is sung with such conviction, the Irish lyrics do not affect the music.

The November 1988 edition of Top magazine, run by Tower Records, included a review by Simon Young who thought Enya had produced "a fine, peaceful New Age album, which works best when her voice-from-heaven is matched with subtle electronic pools of sound and layer upon layer of breathy, Clannadesque backing vocals". Jonathan Takiff, for the Philadelphia Daily News, started his review with: "When this old world starts getting you down, just lay on ... Watermark ... and drift away to a blissful state", of which Enya brings a "fusion of old sod balladry and modem technology to another plateau, with a magical, mysterious brew that could be dubbed "New Age Irish" or "Celtic Ambient"". Takiff picked "Orinoco Flow" as the stand out song, and called "River" a "blissful instrumental". He concluded with: "There's nothing uptempo to ever jar the hypnotic ebb and flow. Just lay back and let this music roll all over you." In a review printed in The Boston Globe, Steve Morse called the record a "series of lush dreamscapes that team the vocal beauty of Irish traditional song with multitracked synthesizer tones", and compared it to works from fellow ambient and new age artists Jean-Michel Jarre, Vangelis and Brian Eno. Its sound, he thought, is "beautiful" and noticed a recurrence of the imagery of water throughout. Morse concluded, "This is an album of atmospheres – true mood music for the soul".

Helena Mulkerns in Rolling Stone called the album "a rich mood piece of broad proportions" and "a glorious aural mosaic". The title track "sails the listener gently into an ebb-and-flow movement that permeates the album" that contains multi-vocals she described as "distinctive" and "striking". She thought Roma's lyrics were "unornamented but compelling", and that its multi-lingual touches "enrich" the listening experience without becoming too dominating. Kristine McKenna, in the Los Angeles Times, wrote a critical review, describing it as "a portentous pastiche that's drawn comparisons to ecclesiastical choir and Gregorian chant, but in fact sounds like nothing more than unusually windy New Age music" that "makes for bland, bloodless music ideal for elevators; this is a record about sound rather than lyrics, melody, or any of the other things that invest music with emotion and ideas." In The Village Voice, Robert Christgau labelled the album a "must to avoid" and said Enya exploits popular music's "old reliable women-are-angels scam" while "humanizing technology, perpetrating banal verse in three languages (I'm guessing about the Gaelic after reading the English and figuring out the Latin), and mentioning Africa, the Orinoco, and other deep dark faraway places".

In a retrospective review for AllMusic, critic Ned Raggett said Watermark "established her as the unexpected queen of gentle, Celtic-tinged new age music" with a subtlety that produced strong tracks as a result. Luke Turner of The Quietus noted that with its "quiet, clever grace" and influence from "traditional Celtic folk, sacred early music and world music", Watermark stood out "in the context of its bright and garish era", and as "a record inspired by spiritual music in a mainstream pop world that has in recent years chosen to end the centuries-old musical dialogue between the secular and religious, the sacred and profane."

== Track listing ==
All music by Enya and arranged by Enya and Nicky Ryan; all lyrics by Roma Ryan.

Side one
| No. | Title | Length |
|---|---|---|
| 1. | "Watermark" | 2:25 |
| 2. | "Cursum Perficio" | 4:09 |
| 3. | "On Your Shore" | 4:00 |
| 4. | "Storms in Africa" | 4:04 |
| 5. | "Exile" | 4:21 |
| 6. | "Miss Clare Remembers" | 1:59 |

Side two
| No. | Title | Length |
|---|---|---|
| 7. | "Orinoco Flow" | 4:26 |
| 8. | "Evening Falls..." | 3:49 |
| 9. | "River" | 3:12 |
| 10. | "The Longships" | 3:39 |
| 11. | "Na Laetha Geal M'óige" | 3:56 |
| Total length: | | 40:05 |

1989 and 1991 reissues
| No. | Title | Length |
|---|---|---|
| 12. | "Storms in Africa (Part II)" | 3:01 |
| Total length: | | 43:06 |

2009 Japanese reissue
| No. | Title | Length |
|---|---|---|
| 13. | "Morning Glory" | 2:28 |
| Total length: | | 45:41 |

== Personnel ==
Credits are adapted from the album's liner notes.

Musicians

- Enya – vocals, keyboards, synthesisers
- Davy Spillane – low whistle on "Exile", uilleann pipes on "Na Laetha Geal M'óige"
- Neil Buckley – clarinet on "On Your Shore"
- Chris Hughes – rototoms on "Storms in Africa" and "River", African hand drums on "Storms in Africa"
- Nicky Ryan – handclaps on "Storms in Africa"

Production

- Enya – co-producer, arranger, Irish text adaptation
- Nicky Ryan – producer, arranger
- Ross Cullum – mixing (except "Orinoco Flow"), co-producer, recording engineer
- James "Jimbo" Barton – mixing on "Orinoco Flow"
- Pete Schwier – mixing on "Storms in Africa (Part II)"
- Rob Dickins – executive producer
- David Hiscook – cover photography
- Russel Yamy – additional photography
- Laurence Dunmore – design

== Charts ==
=== Weekly charts ===
Weekly chart performance for Watermark
| Chart | Peak |
|---|---|
| Australian ARIA Albums Chart | 8 |
| Austrian Albums Chart | 15 |
| Canada Top Albums/CDs (RPM) | 3 |
| Dutch Album Top 100 Chart | 4 |
| Finnish Albums Chart | 23 |
| German Media Control Albums Chart | 6 |
| Italian Albums Chart | 18 |
| Japanese Oricon Albums Chart | 7 |
| New Zealand Albums Chart | 1 |
| Norwegian Albums Chart | 5 |
| Spanish Albums Chart | 5 |
| Swedish Albums Chart | 5 |
| Swiss Albums Chart | 1 |
| UK Albums Chart | 5 |
| US Billboard 200 | 25 |

=== Year-end charts ===
1988 year-end chart performance for Watermark
| Chart (1988) | Rank |
|---|---|
| Dutch Albums Chart | 41 |
| UK Albums Chart | 43 |

1989 year-end chart performance for Watermark
| Chart (1989) | Rank |
|---|---|
| Australian Albums Chart | 29 |
| Canadian Albums Chart | 16 |
| Dutch Albums Chart | 52 |
| German Albums Chart | 59 |
| Japanese Albums Chart | 69 |
| Swiss Albums Chart | 17 |
| UK Albums Chart | 30 |
| US Billboard 200 | 60 |

1990 year-end chart performance for Watermark
| Chart (1990) | Rank |
|---|---|
| US Billboard New Age Albums Chart | 9 |

1991 year-end chart performance for Watermark
| Chart (1991) | Rank |
|---|---|
| US Billboard New Age Albums Chart | 17 |

1992 year-end chart performance for Watermark
| Chart (1992) | Rank |
|---|---|
| US Billboard New Age Albums Chart | 5 |
| UK Albums Chart | 100 |

1993 year-end chart performance for Watermark
| Chart (1993) | Rank |
|---|---|
| US Billboard New Age Albums Chart | 2 |

1994 year-end chart performance for Watermark
| Chart (1994) | Rank |
|---|---|
| US Billboard New Age Albums Chart | 9 |

1995 year-end chart performance for Watermark
| Chart (1995) | Rank |
|---|---|
| Australian Albums Chart | 75 |

1996 year-end chart performance for Watermark
| Chart (1996) | Rank |
|---|---|
| Australian Albums Chart | 83 |

1997 year-end chart performance for Watermark
| Chart (1997) | Rank |
|---|---|
| US Billboard New Age Catalog Albums Chart | 1 |

1998 year-end chart performance for Watermark
| Chart (1998) | Rank |
|---|---|
| US Billboard New Age Catalog Albums Chart | 5 |

== Certifications ==
Certifications for Watermark
| Region | Certification | Certified units/sales |
|---|---|---|
| Argentina (CAPIF) | Platinum | 60,000^{^} |
| Australia (ARIA) | 6× Platinum | 420,000^{^} |
| Belgium (BRMA) | Platinum | 50,000^{*} |
| Brazil (Pro-Música Brasil) | Platinum | 250,000^{*} |
| Canada (Music Canada) | 3× Platinum | 300,000^{^} |
| France (SNEP) | 2× Gold | 200,000^{*} |
| Germany (BVMI) | Platinum | 500,000^{^} |
| Japan (RIAJ) | 2× Platinum | 400,000^{^} |
| South Korea | — | 140,000 |
| Netherlands (NVPI) | Platinum | 100,000^{^} |
| New Zealand (RMNZ) | Platinum | 15,000^{^} |
| Spain (Promusicae) | 5× Platinum | 500,000^{^} |
| Switzerland (IFPI Switzerland) | Platinum | 50,000^{^} |
| United Kingdom (BPI) | 4× Platinum | 1,200,000^{^} |
| United States (RIAA) | 4× Platinum | 4,000,000^{^} |
Summaries
| Worldwide | — | 11,000,000 |
^{*} Sales figures based on certification alone.^{^} Shipments figures based on certification alone.

== Release history ==
| Country | Date | Format | Label |
|---|---|---|---|
| Europe | 19 September 1988 | CD; cassette | WEA |
| United States | 10 January 1989 | CD; cassette | Geffen |
| United States | 11 December 1991 | CD; cassette | Reprise |
| Japan | March 2009 | CD | Warner Music Japan |
| Worldwide | 21 October 2016 | LP | WEA; Reprise |
