= Evening Falls... =

1988 single by Enya

Single by Enya

from the album Watermark
- B-side: "Oíche Chiúin"; "Morning Glory"
- Released: 12 December 1988
- Studio: Orinoco (London, England); Aigle (Artane, Ireland)
- Genre: New-age
- Length: 3:46
- Label: WEA
- Songwriters: Enya; Roma Ryan
- Producer: Nicky Ryan

Enya singles chronology
"Orinoco Flow" (1988)	"Evening Falls..." (1988)	"Storms in Africa" (1989)

Music video
- "Evening Falls..." on YouTube

"Evening Falls..." is a new-age song by Irish singer-songwriter Enya. It was released in December 1988 as the second single from her second album, Watermark (1988). It was written by Enya and her long-time collaborator Roma Ryan, and produced by Roma's husband Nicky Ryan. The song reached number 3 in Ireland, alongside top 20 peaks in New Zealand and the United Kingdom. It was also a top 30 hit in the Flanders region of Belgium.

== Music and lyrics ==
"Evening Falls..." is a song that Roma Ryan described as "a song of a spirit travelling". It is based on a ghost story that Roma had heard, about a woman who had recurring dreams of a house in America, only to accidentally come across it years later in England. Upon entering the house, its inhabitants become frightened of the woman as they explain she had haunted the house each time she dreamed about it. Nicky thought a melody Enya had written suited the story, which led to Roma writing a lyric inspired by it.

== Critical reception ==
Music & Media commented, "Harking back to her Clannad days, this is in a similar vein to the theme tune to Harry's Game. Haunting stuff."

== Track listing ==
1. "Evening Falls..."
2. "Oíche Chiún"
3. "Morning Glory"

== Charts ==
Weekly chart performance for "Evening Falls..."
Chart (1988)	Peak position
Australia (ARIA)	104
Belgium (Ultratop 50 Flanders)	29
Europe (Eurochart Hot 100)	96
Ireland (IRMA)	3
Netherlands (Dutch Top 40 Tipparade)	2
Netherlands (Single Top 100)	32
New Zealand (Recorded Music NZ)	14
UK Singles (Official Charts)	20

== Release history ==
Release dates and formats for "Evening Falls..."
Region	Date	Format(s)	Label(s)	Ref.
United Kingdom	12 December 1988	7-inch vinyl; 12-inch vinyl; CD	WEA	
Japan	25 April 1989	Mini-CD	WEA	
