= Orinoco Flow =

1988 single by Enya

Single by Enya

from the album Watermark
- B-side: "Smaoitím..." (d'Aodh agus do Mháire Uí Dhúgain): "Out of the Blue"
- Released: 3 October 1988
- Studio: Aigle (Dublin, Ireland); Orinoco (London, England)
- Genre: New age; pop
- Length: 4:25
- Label: WEA
- Songwriters: Enya; Roma Ryan
- Producer: Nicky Ryan

Enya singles chronology
"I Want Tomorrow" (1987)	"Orinoco Flow" (1988)	"Evening Falls..." (1988)

Music video
- "Orinoco Flow" on YouTube

"Orinoco Flow", also released as "Orinoco Flow (Sail Away)", is a song by the Irish singer-songwriter Enya from her second studio album, Watermark (1988). It was released on 3 October 1988 by WEA Records in the United Kingdom and by Geffen Records in the United States the following year. The song topped the UK Singles Chart for three weeks and received two Grammy Award nominations for Best Music Video and Best New Age Performance at the 32nd Annual Grammy Awards. The Guardian ranked "Orinoco Flow" at number 77 on its list of the 100 greatest UK number-one singles in 2020.

== Background ==
The song was released as the lead single from Enya's studio album Watermark on 3 October 1988. It became a global success, reaching number one in several countries, including Belgium, Ireland, the Netherlands, Switzerland and the United Kingdom, where it stayed at the top of the UK Singles Chart for three weeks. In the United States, the song peaked at number 24 on the Billboard Hot 100 in April 1989.

The title of the song is an allusion both to Orinoco Studios (now Miloco Studios), where it was recorded, and to the Orinoco river in South America. Its pizzicato chords were generated by customising a Roland D-50 synthesizer patch. Enya was signed to WEA by Rob Dickins, who served as executive producer of Watermark, and the song pays homage to Dickins in the line "with Rob Dickins at the wheel". Co-producer Ross Cullum is referred to in the song with a pun on Ross Dependency: "We can sigh, say goodbye / Ross and his dependencies".

=== Lyrics ===
The lyrics have been likened to "an itinerary for the most expensive gap year of all time", mentioning an array of locations like a "global geography lesson". Locations mentioned in the song include Orinoco River, Fiji, Tiree, Peru, Cali, Bali, and Cebu.

=== Legacy ===
In 1994, the song was licensed to Virgin Records for the best-selling new-age music compilation album Pure Moods, which contributed to further exposure and "helped provide a multi-platinum bonanza" to the record company.

In 1998, a special-edition tenth-anniversary remix single was released.

In a 2015 interview with The Irish Times, Enya said: "Longevity is all any artist dreams of", rather than to dwell on how her songs are remembered. She credits "Orinoco Flow" for some of her cross-generational appeal, saying: "people who used to like Orinoco Flow are now playing my music to their children". In another interview, when asked whether people bring up "Orinoco Flow", she responded: "people say 'sail away' to me or whistle bits of it back to me. I think it's wonderful—I never tire of it."

== Critical reception ==
Ned Raggett from AllMusic described the song as "distinct" and "downright catchy". He noted "its implicit dramatics, [that] gently charges instead of piling things on".

== Music video ==
A video was made to accompany the song. It features Enya singing the song in front of footage of rivers, flowers and nature, edited to have the appearance of a painting. It was directed by Michael Geoghegan.

== Track listings ==
7-inch and cassette single
No.	Title	Length
1.	"Orinoco Flow" (edit)	3:44
2.	"Out of the Blue"	3:10

12-inch and mini-CD single
No.	Title	Length
1.	"Orinoco Flow"	4:25
2.	"Smaoitím..." (d'Aodh agus do Mháire Uí Dhúgain)	6:05
3.	"Out of the Blue"	3:10

Japanese CD 3 Tracks EP (1990)
No.	Title	Length
1.	"Orinoco Flow" (7-inch version)	3:48
2.	"Evening Falls..."	3:49
3.	"Storms in Africa" (single version)	3:01

Japanese CD single (1998)
No.	Title	Length
1.	"Orinoco Flow"	3:47
2.	"Hope Has a Place"	4:46
3.	"Pax Deorum"	4:57

== Charts ==
=== Weekly charts ===
Weekly chart performance for "Orinoco Flow"
Chart (1988–1989)	Peak position
Australia (ARIA)	6
Austria (Ö3 Austria Top 40)	8
Belgium (Ultratop 50 Flanders)	1
Canada Top Singles (RPM)	4
Denmark (IFPI)	6
Europe (Eurochart Hot 100)	1
Finland (Suomen virallinen lista)	5
France (SNEP)	16
Ireland (IRMA)	1
Italy (Musica e dischi)	20
Italy Airplay (Music & Media)	11
Netherlands (Dutch Top 40)	1
Netherlands (Single Top 100)	1
New Zealand (Recorded Music NZ)	2
Norway (VG-lista)	5
Portugal (AFP)	3
Sweden (Sverigetopplistan)	2
Switzerland (Schweizer Hitparade)	1
UK Singles (Official Charts)	1
US Billboard Hot 100	24
US Adult Contemporary (Billboard)	7
US Alternative Airplay (Billboard)	6
US Cash Box Top 100	25
US Adult Contemporary (Radio & Records)	5
US CHR (Radio & Records)	25
US New Rock (Radio & Records)	7
West Germany (GfK)	2

=== Year-end charts ===
1988 year-end chart performance for "Orinoco Flow"
Chart (1988)	Position
Belgium (Ultratop)	56
Europe (Eurochart Hot 100)	83
Netherlands (Dutch Top 40)	40
Netherlands (Single Top 100)	23
UK Singles (OCC)	18

1989 year-end chart performance for "Orinoco Flow"
Chart (1989)	Position
Australia (ARIA)	43
Canada Top Singles (RPM)	60
Europe (Eurochart Hot 100)	72
New Zealand (RIANZ)	34
Switzerland (Schweizer Hitparade)	19
West Germany (Media Control)	20

== Certifications ==
Certifications and sales for "Orinoco Flow"
Region	Certification	Certified units/sales
New Zealand (RMNZ)	Gold	15,000^{‡}
Spain (Promusicae)	Gold	30,000^{‡}
United Kingdom (BPI)	Gold	500,000^{‡}
^{‡} Sales+streaming figures based on certification alone.

== Release history ==
Release dates and formats for "Orinoco Flow"
Region	Date	Format(s)	Label(s)	Ref.
United Kingdom	3 October 1988	7-inch vinyl; 12-inch vinyl; CD	WEA	
Japan	25 February 1989	Mini-CD	WEA	
Japan	25 June 1990	CD	WEA	

== In popular culture ==
After a wave of popularity, including regular rotation on MTV, the song became "a punch line", representing a new-age cliché of "generic 'bubble bath' music". The song was used in scenes depicting relaxation and to highlight this in a jokey manner. In the 1997 South Park episode "Death", Stan Marsh (Trey Parker)'s grandfather Marvin Marsh (Parker) locks Stan in a room and plays a parody of the song performed by Toddy Walters to illustrate what it feels like to be old.

In the 2002 I'm Alan Partridge episode "The Talented Mr. Alan", Alan Partridge (Steve Coogan) is caught singing the song to himself. The song is in "Funeral", the 2003 sixth episode of the first series of Peep Show; the video is shown and the song plays over the end credits. The song is played during Rumpelstiltskin (Walt Dorhn)'s announcement scene in the 2010 film Shrek Forever After. It is in the 2010 first season episode, "Letting You Go", of Cougar Town. The song was briefly played during a monster cruise commercial in the 2018 film Hotel Transylvania 3: Summer Vacation. The song was also used as the title song for the Netflix comedy-drama series Living with Yourself starring Paul Rudd and Aisling Bea.

Alternatively, the song is used in media to create a dissonance between its calmness and starkly contrasting visuals. The song is featured during a sequence in David Fincher's 2011 adaptation of the novel The Girl with the Dragon Tattoo, in which Mikael Blomkvist (Daniel Craig) is tortured while the song plays. In the 2016 Black Mirror episode "Hated in the Nation", one of the characters listens to the song to relax "shortly before she’s torn apart by murderous drones" and effectively returned "Orinoco Flow" to the top of the new-age charts after the episode was released. In the 2017 Brooklyn Nine-Nine episode "Crime and Punishment", character Jake Peralta (Andy Samberg) mentions Enya as one of his favorite musical artists. Later on, "Orinoco Flow" plays as he walks, in slow motion, into a courtroom. Producer Dan Goor remarked, "We weren't trying to attach ourselves to a history of making fun of it. The joke was just that it's 100 percent the wrong music to play. It's supposed to be this triumphant, badass moment, and instead we're playing that song."

An exception to this is the use of the song in the 2018 Bo Burnham film Eighth Grade. Burnham wrote to Enya directly for permission to use the song, and recognized it as a serious choice for the film; "in Eighth Grade, 'Orinoco Flow' finally gets to be itself" rather than "fodder for ironic laughs".</ref>

=== Other references ===
"Orinoco Flow" has been used in reference to various object names including an iris cultivar Orinoco Flow by iris breeder Cy Bartlett in 1989, and Leporinus enyae, a species of fish from the Orinoco drainage basin named for the artist herself.

In the 2017 ITV tribute to Diana, Princess of Wales, Diana, Our Mother: Her Life and Legacy, Prince Harry recalls his mother listening to Enya driving in her BMW with the top down.

AIDA cruise ships play this song often when they are put to sea.
