= Storms in Africa =

1989 single by Enya

Single by Enya

from the album Watermark
- A-side: "Storms in Africa (Part II)"
- B-side: "The Celts"; "Aldebaran"
- Released: 22 May 1989
- Studio: Orinoco (London, England); Aigle (Artane, Ireland)
- Length: 4:02
- Label: WEA
- Songwriter(s): Enya; Roma Ryan
- Producer(s): Nicky Ryan

Enya singles chronology
"Evening Falls..." (1988)	"Storms in Africa" (1989)	"Caribbean Blue" (1991)

Music video
- "Storms In Africa" on YouTube

"Storms in Africa" is a song by Irish singer-songwriter Enya from her second studio album, Watermark (1988). A rearranged version with English lyrics called "Storms in Africa (Part II)" was included in some later pressings of Watermark and released as a single in May 1989 that reached number 41 on the UK Singles Chart.

The song was included on the soundtrack for the film Green Card (1990). For a time, the Australian airline Ansett Airlines used the song as its theme prior to its collapse in 2001.

== Critical reception ==
Ned Raggett from AllMusic noted that "Storms in Africa" uses drums from Chris Hughes "to add to the understated, evocative fire of the song, which certainly lives up to its name."

== Track listings ==
No.	Title	Length
1.	"Storms in Africa II"	3:02
2.	"Storms in Africa I"	4:02

12-inch vinyl and CD B-sides

No.	Title	Length
1.	"The Celts"	2:56
2.	"Aldebaran"	3:05

== Charts ==
Chart (1989)	Peak position
Ireland (IRMA)	12
UK Singles (OCC)	41

== Release history ==
Region	Date	Format(s)	Label(s)	Ref.
United Kingdom	22 May 1989	7-inch vinyl; 12-inch vinyl	WEA	
United Kingdom	5 June 1989	CD1	WEA	
United Kingdom	19 June 1989	CD2; cassette	WEA	
Japan	25 June 1989	Mini-CD	WEA	
Japan	25 July 1989	CD	WEA	
