= The Corrs discography =

Band discography

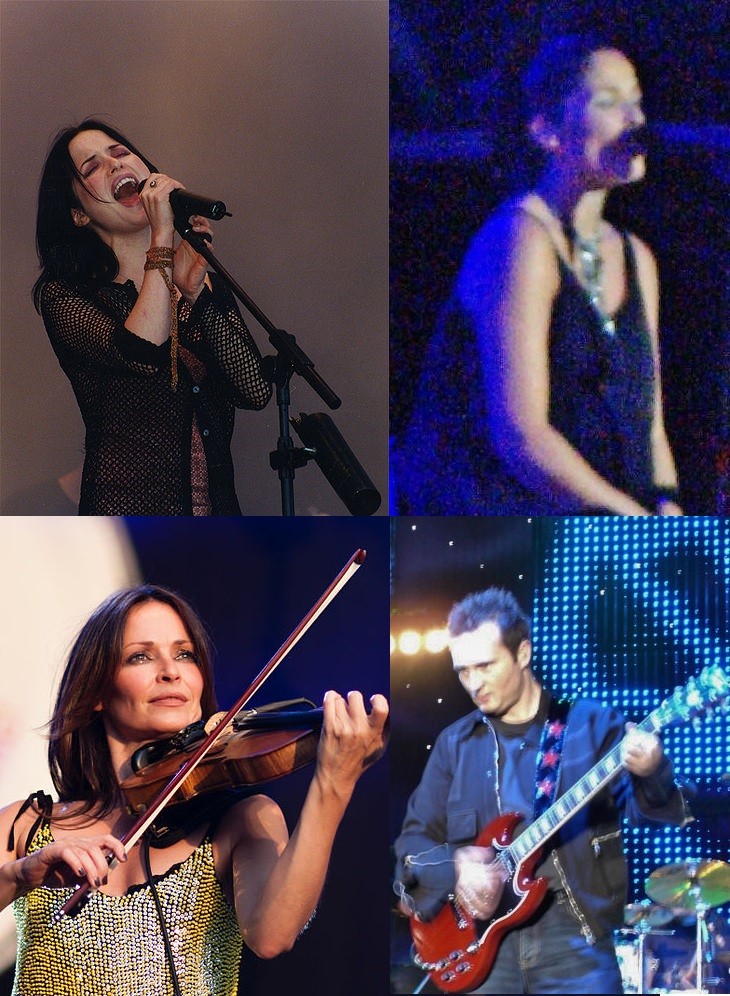
- Members of The Corrs, clockwise from top left: Andrea, Caroline, Jim, and Sharon Corr
- Studio albums: 7
- Live albums: 3
- Compilation albums: 3
- Singles: 31
- Video albums: 6
- Music videos: 28

The Corrs are an Irish folk rock/pop band consisting of siblings Andrea (lead vocals, tin whistle, mandolin, ukulele), Sharon (violin, vocals), Caroline (drums, piano, bodhrán, percussion, vocals) and Jim Corr (guitar, piano, keyboards, vocals). Formed in their hometown of Dundalk, Ireland, in 1990, the band's discography includes seven studio albums, three live albums and three compilation albums, as well as six video albums, twenty-eight music videos and thirty-one singles. This list does not include material recorded by The Corrs as solo artists.

Their debut album, Forgiven, Not Forgotten, was produced by David Foster and released in 1995 by Atlantic Records in conjunction with 143 Records. Preceded by debut single "Runaway", the album was an immediate success in both their home territory and Australia. Commercial success elsewhere was initially modest, however. Their 1997 follow-up, Talk On Corners, once again found the band receiving little attention outside Ireland and Australia. Meanwhile, the group had contributed a cover of Fleetwood Mac's "Dreams" to Legacy: A Tribute to Fleetwood Mac's Rumours. On 17 March 1998, they performed the song at London's Royal Albert Hall alongside Fleetwood Mac drummer Mick Fleetwood as part of the BBC's televised coverage of St. Patrick's Day. This event did much to raise the band's profile. Following this, Talk On Corners was re-released to include their cover of "Dreams", along with new single versions of "What Can I Do?", "So Young" and "Runaway". Selling almost 3 million copies in the UK, the album was the highest-selling release of 1998 and ninth highest-selling of 1999, and remains the nineteenth best-selling album of all time in British chart history. The album is also the twelfth highest-selling album of all time in Ireland.

Their first live album, Unplugged, was released in 1999 and was followed ten months later by In Blue. Dedicated to the memory of their mother Jean, who died during production of the album, it went straight to number one in Ireland with the third highest opening week sales in the history of the chart. Lead single "Breathless" gave them their first and only UK number one, while the album also attained platinum status in the United States for shipments of over one million units. The set also topped the charts in seventeen other countries.

Borrowed Heaven (2004) was a return to their Celtic roots, after the more pop-oriented In Blue. It peaked at number one in Ireland and was certified gold or platinum in numerous territories, including Australia, France, Germany and New Zealand, among others. Home, which featured traditional Irish music taken from their late mother's songbook, was released in 2005. Dreams: The Ultimate Corrs Collection (2006) was released following the announcement that the band would go on indefinite hiatus, citing personal reasons. In the following years, members of the band would go on to have eight children between them. Andrea would also go on to have starring roles in three feature films, and acted in the play Dancing at Lughnasa. Both Andrea and Sharon also released solo albums, Ten Feet High (2007) and Lifelines (2011); and Dream of You (2010) and The Same Sun (2013), respectively. The band reformed in 2015 and subsequently released a further two studio albums: White Light (2015) and Jupiter Calling (2017). The Corrs have sold more than 40 million albums worldwide.

In 2023, their 2001 Best of The Corrs will be re-released with three new Fleetwood Mac singles. The album is to be released on LP for the first time.

== Albums ==
=== Studio albums ===
List of studio albums, with selected chart positions and certifications
Title	Album details	Peak chart positions										Certifications
Title	Album details	IRE	AUS	AUT	CAN	FRA	GER	NLD	SPA	UK	US	Certifications
Forgiven, Not Forgotten	Released: 26 September 1995; Label: Atlantic, 143, Lava; Formats: CD, LP, CS, MD	2	1	10	50	16	86	38	4	2	131	IRMA: 13× Platinum; ARIA: 9× Platinum; BPI: 3× Platinum; MC: Platinum; PROMUSICAE: 3× Platinum; RIAA: Gold; SNEP: Platinum
Talk on Corners	Released: 17 October 1997; Label: Atlantic, 143, Lava; Formats: CD, LP, CS, MD	1	3	9	87	5	9	13	5	1	72	IRMA: 20× Platinum; ARIA: 5× Platinum; BPI: 9× Platinum; BVMI: Gold; MC: Gold; NVPI: Gold; PROMUSICAE: 6× Platinum; RIAA: Gold; SNEP: 2× Gold
In Blue	Released: 17 July 2000; Label: Atlantic, 143, Lava; Formats: CD, LP, CS, MD, DVD-A	1	1	1	5	2	1	2	1	1	21	IRMA: 6× Platinum; ARIA: 4× Platinum; BPI: 3× Platinum; BVMI: 3× Gold; IFPI AUT: Platinum; MC: Platinum; NVPI: Platinum; PROMUSICAE: 3× Platinum; RIAA: Platinum; SNEP: Platinum
Borrowed Heaven	Released: 31 May 2004; Label: Atlantic; Formats: CD, LP, DI	1	4	5	21	5	2	4	2	2	51	ARIA: Platinum; BPI: Gold; BVMI: Gold; PROMUSICAE: Gold; SNEP: Gold
Home	Released: 26 September 2005; Label: Atlantic; Formats: CD, LP, DI	1	44	13	—	5	12	15	8	14	—	IRMA: 2× Platinum; BPI: Silver; PROMUSICAE: Gold; SNEP: Platinum
White Light	Released: 27 November 2015; Label: East West; Formats: CD, DI	10	18	13	—	28	11	17	25	11	—	BPI: Gold
Jupiter Calling	Released: 10 November 2017; Label: East West; Formats: CD, LP, DI	20	27	46	—	52	42	31	13	15	—	
"—" denotes a release that did not chart or was not released in that territory.

=== Live albums ===
List of live albums, with selected chart positions and certifications
Title	Album details	Peak chart positions										Certifications
Title	Album details	IRE	AUS	AUT	FRA	GER	NLD	SPA	SWI	UK	US	Certifications
The Corrs – Live^{[A]}	Released: 25 February 1997; Label: WEA Japan; Formats: CD	not released										
Unplugged	Released: 12 November 1999; Label: Atlantic, 143, Lava; Formats: CD, CS, MD	1	14	1	5	6	3	8	3	7	—	IRMA: 8× Platinum; ARIA: Platinum; BPI: 2× Platinum; BVMI: 3× Gold; IFPI AUT: Platinum; IFPI SWI: Platinum; NVPI: 2× Platinum; PROMUSICAE: 3× Platinum; SNEP: Platinum
VH1 Presents: The Corrs, Live in Dublin^{[B]}	Released: 12 March 2002; Label: Atlantic; Formats: CD	12	not released								52	

Notes

- A Released only in Japan.
- B Released only in the US; charted in Ireland as an import release.

=== Compilation albums ===
List of compilation albums, with selected chart positions and certifications
Title	Album details	Peak chart positions										Certifications
Title	Album details	IRE	AUS	CAN	FRA	GER	NLD	NZ	SPA	SWI	UK	Certifications
Best of The Corrs	Released: 5 November 2001; Label: Atlantic, 143, Lava; Formats: CD, digital download	1	2	20	—	12	6	2	2	20	6	IRMA: 5× Platinum; ARIA: 4× Platinum; BPI: 2× Platinum; BVMI: Gold; IFPI SWI: Platinum; MC: Gold; NVPI: Platinum; PROMUSICAE: Platinum; RMNZ: 2× Platinum; SNEP: Platinum
Dreams: The Ultimate Corrs Collection	Released: 20 November 2006; Label: Atlantic; Formats: CD, digital download	24	—	—	74	—	71	33	5	44	67	IRMA: Gold
The Works	Released: 25 September 2007; Label: Rhino; Formats: CD box set	—	not released								—	
"—" denotes a release that did not chart.

== Singles ==
List of singles, with selected chart positions and certifications
Title	Year	Peak chart positions										Certifications	Album
Title	Year	IRE	AUS	CAN	GER	NLD	NZ	SPA	SWI	UK	US	Certifications	Album
"Runaway"	1995	10	10	25	89	—	48	30	—	49	68	ARIA: Platinum; RMNZ: Gold	Forgiven, Not Forgotten
"Forgiven, Not Forgotten"	1995	—	15	31	—	—	—	35	—	155	—		Forgiven, Not Forgotten
"The Right Time"	1995	—	44	32	76	—	—	32	—	84	—		Forgiven, Not Forgotten
"Love to Love You"	1996	—	25	—	87	—	46	40	—	62	—		Forgiven, Not Forgotten
"Closer" (Note: Released only in Australia and New Zealand.)	1997	—	138	—	—	—	—	—	—	—	—		Forgiven, Not Forgotten
"Only When I Sleep"	1997	10	34	—	—	—	—	1	—	58	—		Talk on Corners
"I Never Loved You Anyway"	1997	—	31	—	—	—	—	15	—	43	—		Talk on Corners
"What Can I Do"	1998	30	—	—	62	—	—	—	—	53	—		Talk on Corners
"Dreams"	1998	6	47	38	73	71	—	5	—	6	—	BPI: Silver	Talk on Corners
"What Can I Do" (Tin Tin Out remix)	1998	—	86	—	—	—	—	1	—	3	—	BPI: Gold	Talk on Corners: Special Edition
"So Young" (K-Klass remix)	1998	29	61	—	80	63	—	1	—	6	—	BPI: Silver	Talk on Corners: Special Edition
"Runaway" (Tin Tin Out remix)	1999	—	—	—	—	—	—	—	—	2	—	BPI: Platinum	Talk on Corners: Special Edition
"Lifting Me" (Note: Released only in Ireland and the UK as part of a promotional campaign for Pepsi.)	1999	—	—	—	—	—	—	—	—	—	—		—N/a
"Radio"	1999	20	120	—	64	57	19	1	52	18	—		Unplugged
"Old Town"	2000	—	—	—	—	63	—	18	—	—	—		Unplugged
"Breathless"	2000	3	7	—	19	17	3	1	15	1	34	ARIA: 2× Platinum; BPI: Platinum; RMNZ: Platinum	In Blue
"Irresistible"	2000	30	27	—	68	79	8	14	47	20	—		In Blue
"Give Me a Reason"	2001	—	68	—	100	81	13	30	53	27	—		In Blue
"All the Love in the World" (Note: Released only in North America.)	2001	—	—	—	—	—	—	—	—	—	—		In Blue
"Would You Be Happier?"	2001	26	47	—	81	39	10	6	36	14	—		Best of The Corrs
"Summer Sunshine"	2004	12	13	—	49	20	30	1	32	6	—		Borrowed Heaven
"Angel"	2004	19	65	—	84	73	36	15	53	16	—		Borrowed Heaven
"Long Night"	2004	31	86	—	40	—	36	—	—	31	—		Borrowed Heaven
"Heart Like a Wheel/Old Town"	2005	49	—	—	—	—	—	10	—	68	—		Home
"Moorlough Shore"	2005	—	—	—	—	—	—	—	—	—	—		Home
"Goodbye" (2006 remix)	2006	—	—	—	—	—	—	—	—	—	—		Dreams: The Ultimate Corrs Collection
"Bring on the Night"	2015	—	—	—	—	—	—	—	—	— (Note: "Bring on the Night" did not enter the UK Singles Chart, but peaked at number 87 on both the UK Singles Downloads Chart and the UK Singles Sales Chart, as well as number 72 on Scottish Singles Chart.)	—		White Light
"I Do What I Like"	2016	—	—	—	—	—	—	—	—	—	—		White Light
"SOS"	2017	—	—	—	—	—	—	—	—	—	—		Jupiter Calling
"Little Lies"	2023	—	—	—	—	—	—	—	—	— (Note: "Little Lies" did not enter the UK Singles Chart, but debuted and peaked at number 15 on the UK Vinyl Singles Chart.)	—		Best of the Corrs (re-issue)
"Songbird"	2023	—	—	—	—	—	—	—	—	—	—		Best of the Corrs (re-issue)
"—" denotes singles that did not chart or were not released in that territory.

== Other charted songs ==
List of other charted songs, with selected chart positions
Title	Year	Peak chart positions				Album
Title	Year	IRE	SPA	UK	US Adult	Album
"The Right Time" (Remix)	1996	—	38	—	—	Forgiven, Not Forgotten
"Runaway" (Live)	1997	—	22	—	—	Forgiven, Not Forgotten
"When He's Not Around"	1999	—	23	—	—	Talk on Corners
"No Good for Me"	1999	—	40	—	—	Talk on Corners
"I Know My Love" The Chieftains with The Corrs	1999	22	14	37	—	Tears of Stone
"The Hardest Day" Alejandro Sanz with The Corrs	2001	—	4	—	—	non-album single
"When the Stars Go Blue" (Remix) with Bono	2007	—	1	—	18	Dreams: The Ultimate Corrs Collection

== Videography ==
=== Video albums ===
List of video albums, with selected chart positions and certifications
Title	Album details	Peak chart positions		Certifications
Title	Album details	AUS	UK	Certifications
Live at the Royal Albert Hall	Released: 28 August 1998; Label: Warner Music Vision; Director: Janet Fraser-Crook; Formats: VHS · DVD-Video	9	1	ARIA: 2× Platinum; BPI: Platinum
Unplugged	Released: 28 February 2000; Label: Warner Music Vision; Director: Elizabeth Barret; Format: VHS · DVD-Video	32	4	ARIA: Platinum; BPI: Platinum
Live at Lansdowne Road	Released: 29 October 2000; Label: Warner Music Vision; Director: Nick Wickham · Ciarán Tanham; Formats: VHS · DVD-Video	3	4	BPI: Gold; ARIA: Platinum
Live in London	Released: 11 November 2001; Label: Warner Music Vision; Director: Hamish Hamilton; Formats: DVD-Video · Video CD · VHS	1	4	BPI: Gold; ARIA: Platinum
The Best of − The Videos	Released: 8 December 2002; Label: Warner Music Vision; Director: Various; Formats: DVD-Video	6	21	ARIA: Platinum
All the Way Home – A History of the Corrs / Live in Geneva	Released: 20 November 2005; Label: Warner Music Vision · Rhino; Director: Ciarán Tanham · Rob O'Connor; Formats: DVD-Video	31	13	

=== Music videos ===
List of music videos, showing year released and directors
Title	Year	Director
"Runaway"	1995	Randee St. Nicholas
"Forgiven, Not Forgotten"	1995	Mark Gerard
"The Right Time"	1995	Kevin Bray
"Love to Love You"	1996	Ciarán Tanham
"Only When I Sleep"	1997	Nigel Dick
"I Never Loved You Anyway"	1997	Dani Jacobs
"What Can I Do" (Tin Tin Out Remix)	1998	Nigel Dick
"Dreams"	1998	Dani Jacobs
"So Young" (K-Klass Remix)	1998	Dani Jacobs
"Runaway" (Tin Tin Out Remix)	1999	Dani Jacobs
"Radio" (Unplugged)	1999	Nick Wickham
"Old Town" (Unplugged)	1999	Nick Wickham
"Everybody Hurts" (Unplugged)	1999	Nick Wickham
"Breathless"	2000	Nigel Dick
"Irresistible"	2000	Joseph Kahn
"Give Me a Reason"	2001	Nick Wickham
"Una Noche" (Spanish version of "One Night")	2001	Nick Wickham
"The Hardest Day" (duet with Alejandro Sanz)	2001	Nick Wickham
"All the Love in the World"	2001	Darren Grant
Would You Be Happier?	2001	Dani Jacobs
"When the Stars Go Blue" (Live at VH1)	2002	Hamish Hamilton
"Summer Sunshine"	2004	Kevin Godley
"Summer Sunshine" (Version 2)	2004	—N/a
"Angel"	2004	Nigel Dick
"Long Night"	2004	Mark Davis
"Bring on the Night"	2015	—N/a
"Son of Solomon"	2017	Andrea Corr
"Ellis Island"	2025	Live
