= The Corrs: Live at the Royal Albert Hall =

1998 video album by the Corrs

Video by The Corrs
- Released: 28 August 1998
- Recorded: 17 March 1998
- Venues: Royal Albert Hall, London, England
- Genres: Pop rock; alternative rock; Celtic
- Length: 85 minutes
- Labels: Atlantic Records; Warner Music Vision; Lava Records; 143 Records
- Director: Janet Fraser-Crook
- Producers: Janet Fraser-Crook; Mark Cooper; Ray Still

The Corrs chronology
The Corrs: Live at the Royal Albert Hall (1998)	The Corrs: Live at Lansdowne Road (1999)

The Corrs: Live at the Royal Albert Hall is the Corrs' first video album, released on DVD on 28 August 1998. The show was recorded on St. Patrick's Day and broadcast later that evening by the BBC while the band were on their Talk on Corners World Tour in the UK. Mick Fleetwood joined the band on stage for "Dreams", "Haste to the Wedding" and "Toss the Feathers".

== Track listing ==
1. Intro
2. "When He's Not Around"
3. "No Good For Me"
4. "Love To Love You"
5. "Forgiven, Not Forgotten"
6. "Joy of Life"
7. "Intimacy"
8. "What Can I Do?"
9. "The Right Time"
10. "Queen Of Hollywood"
11. "Dreams" (with Mick Fleetwood)
12. "Haste to the Wedding" (with Mick Fleetwood)
13. "Runaway"
14. "Only When I Sleep"
15. "Hopelessly Addicted"
16. "I Never Loved You Anyway"
17. "So Young"
18. "Toss the Feathers" (with Mick Fleetwood)

== Certifications ==
Region	Certification	Certified units/sales
Australia (ARIA)	2× Platinum	30,000^{^}
France (SNEP)	Platinum	20,000^{*}
United Kingdom (BPI)	Platinum	50,000^{^}
^{*} Sales figures based on certification alone.^{^} Shipments figures based on certification alone.
