= The Corrs: Live at Lansdowne Road =

2000 video album by the Corrs

Video by The Corrs
- Released: 29 October 2000
- Recorded: 17 July 1999
- Venue: Lansdowne Road, Dublin, Ireland
- Genre: Pop rock; Celtic fusion
- Length: 123 minutes
- Label: Atlantic Records; Warner Music Vision; Lava Records; 143 Records
- Director: Ciarán Tanham; Nick Wickham
- Producer: Ciarán Tanham; Emer Patten; John Hughes; John McDonnell; Ray Still

The Corrs chronology
The Corrs: Live at the Royal Albert Hall (1998)	The Corrs: Live at Lansdowne Road (2000)	The Corrs Unplugged (1999)

The Corrs: Live at Lansdowne Road is the second video album by Irish band the Corrs, released on DVD on 29 October 2000. Filmed on 17 July 1999 on the final date of the Talk on Corners World Tour, the Lansdowne Road concert was a homecoming for the band in front of a home crowd of 45,000 people and would be the biggest part of their career after two platinum-selling albums Forgiven, Not Forgotten and Talk on Corners, several hit singles ("Runaway", "What Can I Do?", "Dreams" and "So Young"), and two world tours.

== Track listing ==
1. Intro
2. "Only When I Sleep"
3. "The Right Time
4. "Joy of Life"
5. "Forgiven, Not Forgotten"
6. "What Can I Do?"
7. "No Frontiers"
8. "Runaway"
9. "Haste to the Wedding"
10. "Secret Life"
11. "Love to Love You"
12. "Queen of Hollywood"
13. Dreams Intro
14. "Dreams"
15. "I Never Loved You Anyway"
16. "Lough Erin Shore"
17. "Closer"
18. "So Young"
19. "Toss the Feathers"
20. Credits

"No Good For Me", "Hopelessly Addicted" and "Jim's Solo" were also performed but were cut from the recording for unknown reasons.

== Special features ==
- 4:3 full frame
- 16:9 wide screen
- DVD 9
- English
- Region 2
- Dolby Digital 5.1 Surround English/Linear PCM Stereo English/Dolby Digital 2.0 Stereo English
- Dolby Digital 5.1 Surround
- PCM Stereo
- Dolby Digital Stereo
- English/French/German/Italian/Spanish

=== Plus ===
- The Corrs Live at the Fleadh Music Festival
- The Corrs In Blue documentary
- The Corrs "Breathless" official music video

== Certifications ==
Region	Certification	Certified units/sales
Australia (ARIA)	Platinum	15,000^{^}
United Kingdom (BPI)	Gold	25,000^{^}
^{^} Shipments figures based on certification alone.
