= Dreams: The Ultimate Corrs Collection =

2006 compilation album by The Corrs

Compilation album by The Corrs
- Released: 20 November 2006
- Recorded: 1994–2006
- Genre: Pop rock; folk rock; Celtic
- Length: 74:46
- Label: Atlantic

The Corrs chronology
Home (2005)	Dreams: The Ultimate Corrs Collection (2006)	The Works (2007)

Professional ratings
Review scores
Source	Rating
AllMusic	4/5 stars

Dreams: The Ultimate Corrs Collection is the second greatest hits album by Irish band The Corrs, released on 20 November 2006, comprising hits, traditional ballads and previously unreleased songs.

== Track listing ==
No.	Title	Writer(s)	Original album	Length
1.	"Goodbye" (2006 remix)	The Corrs	Borrowed Heaven	3:45
2.	"Forgiven, Not Forgotten"	The Corrs	Forgiven, Not Forgotten	4:15
3.	"Dreams" (Tee's radio mix)	Stevie Nicks	Talk on Corners	3:52
4.	"Radio"	The Corrs	Unplugged	4:47
5.	"When the Stars Go Blue" (remix) (featuring Bono)	Ryan Adams	Live in Dublin	3:58
6.	"Only When I Sleep"	The Corrs; Oliver Leiber; Paul Peterson; John Shanks	Talk on Corners	4:17
7.	"Breathless"	The Corrs; Robert John "Mutt" Lange	In Blue	3:25
8.	"So Young" (K-Klass mix)	The Corrs	Talk on Corners	4:12
9.	"Runaway"	The Corrs	Forgiven, Not Forgotten	4:20
10.	"Summer Sunshine"	The Corrs	Borrowed Heaven	2:51
11.	"What Can I Do" (Tin Tin Out mix)	The Corrs	Talk on Corners	4:14
12.	"All I Have to Do Is Dream" (with Laurent Voulzy)	Felice and Boudleaux Bryant	La Septième Vague	3:34
13.	"No Frontiers"	Jimmy MacCarthy	Unplugged	4:24
14.	"Angel"	The Corrs	Borrowed Heaven	3:25
15.	"Old Town"	Jimmy Bain; Phil Lynott	Home	3:44
16.	"Ruby Tuesday" (featuring Ron Wood)	Mick Jagger; Keith Richards	Live in Dublin	3:23
17.	"Haste to the Wedding" (instrumental)	Traditional	Home	2:27
18.	"I Know My Love" (with The Chieftains)	Traditional	Tears of Stone	3:25
19.	"Bríd Óg Ní Mháille"	Traditional	Home	3:36
20.	"Toss the Feathers" (instrumental)	Traditional	Forgiven, Not Forgotten	2:52

Japanese & Australian bonus track
No.	Title	Writer(s)	Original album	Length
21.	"Miracle"	The Corrs	Borrowed Heaven	4:01

Spanish bonus track
No.	Title	Writer(s)	Original album	Length
22.	"Una Noche Con The Corrs (feat. Alejandro Sanz)"	The Corrs & Sanz	Best of The Corrs	4:29
23.	"The Hardest Day (feat. Alejandro Sanz)"	The Corrs & Sanz	El Alma al Aire	4:24

DVD Spanish Edition
No.	Title	Length
1.	"The Corrs live at Sala Macumba, Madrid, 1997"
2.	"The Corrs Concierto Básico Los 40 Principales Madrid, 1998"
3.	"The Corrs Concierto Básico Los 40 Principales Madrid, 2004"

== Personnel ==
- David Boucher – engineer, mixing
- Stuart Bruce – arranger, producer
- Michael Buckley – saxophone
- Matt Chamberlain – drums
- Bob Clearmountain – mixing
- Andrea Corr – lead vocals, tin whistle
- Caroline Corr – percussion, drums, piano, vocals, bodhran
- Jim Corr – guitar, piano, keyboards, vocals, producer
- Sharon Corr – violin, vocals
- The Corrs – producer
- Jorgin Dahl – producer
- Ronan Dooney – piccolo trumpet
- Anthony Drennan – lead guitar, mandolin
- Jason Duffy – drums
- Keith Duffy – bass guitar
- Franck Eultry – keyboards, programming
- David Foster – producer
- Mitchell Froom – producer
- Matt Furnidge – mixing
- Paul Gaster – sleeve photo
- Hans Grottheim – producer, remixing
- John Hughes – management
- K-Klass – remixing, reproduction
- Kieran Kiely – accordion
- Robert John "Mutt" Lange – producer
- Oliver Leiber – producer
- Richard Lowe – remixing
- Steve MacMillan – mixing
- Tim Martin – engineer
- Brian Masterson – mixing
- John McSherry – uilleann pipes, low whistle
- Paul Meehan – keyboards, programming, producer
- Paddy Moloney – producer, mixing
- Andrew Murray – sleeve photo
- Adam Phillips – guitar
- Peter Rafelson – producer
- Brian Rawling – producer
- James Reynolds – mixing
- Olle Romo – producer
- Mike Shipley – mixing
- Tim Summerhayes – engineer
- Todd Terry – producer, remixing
- Tin Tin Out – producer, remixing
- Laurent Voulzy – guitar, vocals

== Charts and certifications ==
=== Charts ===
Chart	Peak position
Belgium Flemish Albums Chart	94
Belgium Wallonie Albums Chart	78
French Albums Chart	74
Irish Albums Chart	24
Netherlands Albums Chart	71
New Zealand Albums Chart	33
Portuguese Albums Chart	21
Spanish Albums Chart	5
Swiss Albums Charts	44
UK Albums Chart	67

=== Certifications ===
Region	Certification	Certified units/sales
Ireland (IRMA)	Gold	7,500^{^}
^{^} Shipments figures based on certification alone.
