= Talk on Corners World Tour =

1997–99 concert tour by the Corrs

Talk on Corners Tour
- Tour by The Corrs
- Promotional poster for the tour
- Location: Asia; Europe; North America; Oceania
- Associated album: Talk on Corners
- Start date: 17 November 1997
- End date: 17 July 1999
- Legs: 12
- No. of shows: 159

The Corrs concert chronology
- Forgiven, Not Forgotten World Tour (1996–97); Talk on Corners Tour (1997–99); In Blue Tour (2000–01)

The Talk on Corners Tour was the second concert tour by Irish folk-rock band The Corrs (siblings Andrea, Corr, Jim and Sharon), launched in support of the band's sophomore studio album of the same name (1997). To date, it was the band's most extensive and longest-running tour, with over 150 dates performed across Eurasia, North America and Oceania.

The world tour began modestly, primarily performing in theatres, concert halls and clubs as the band's notoriety increased; by the tour's conclusion, The Corrs had progressed to filling indoor arenas and amphitheatres, and even some outdoor stadiums; their homecoming concert on 17 July 1999 at Dublin's Lansdowne Road accommodated roughly 40,000 people. Additionally, the band headlined an array of international music festivals and other events throughout 1997–1999, and opened for the Rolling Stones on several dates in the US and Europe during their No Security Tour.

== Background ==
Following a late 1997 press tour for their sophomore studio album, Talk on Corners, the band began concert rehearsals in October of that year at The Factory, Dublin. Over several weeks of rehearsals, the band continued promoting their album and the upcoming tour through various radio stations and other media outlets throughout Europe and the UK. In February 1998, the Corrs kicked-off the Oceania leg of their tour, with multiple dates in Australia and New Zealand; while in the latter country, they recorded the music video for the album's third single, "What Can I Do?". At the time, The Corrs had stated in interviews that they were feeling somewhat homesick for Ireland, and that filming a music video in the New Zealand countryside reminded them of home.

In spring 1998, The Corrs began a tour of concert halls in Great Britain. On Saint Patrick's Day, the band performed a special gig at London's Royal Albert Hall, with the performance being broadcast on television and eventually released on home video/DVD as The Corrs: Live at the Royal Albert Hall. The concert featured famed percussionist/drummer Mick Fleetwood (of Fleetwood Mac) joining the on their cover of his band's 1976 hit "Dreams", as well as the traditional Irish tunes "Haste to the Wedding", and the finale, "Toss the Feathers". The live broadcast helped push "Dreams" to the No. 6 spot on the British singles chart, swiftly propelling their overall fame. By the end of 1998, The Corrs had become one of the most famous Irish bands besides U2 and The Cranberries. The group's success continued throughout that year, with their follow-up singles, "Runaway (Tin Tin Out Remix)", a remixed version of their debut 1995 single, and "So Young (K-Klass Remix)", peaking within the top five of the British singles chart, respectively.

After breaking into the British and European music scenes, the band set-out to continue that same momentum in North America, where their tour commenced in October 1998. During their stop in Chicago, the band shot the music video for "So Young".

In December 1998, the band set off on a more ambitious UK/European tour, selling out a five-night run at Wembley Arena, as well as selling out a majority of the other dates on the tour. In March 1999, the band toured North America as supporting act for The Rolling Stones as part of their No Security Tour. In July 1999, the band set off on a summer festival tour as they did the previous July (1998). On 17 July 1999, the band played for one of their biggest audience to date, at that point, in front of 45,000 people at Lansdowne Road football stadium. They were the second Irish band ever to headline a stadium gig (U2 were the first). This concert was recorded and would eventually be released onto VHS and DVD. Many consider this to be one of the band's greatest live performances. The tour concluded two weeks later, on 31 July 1999, in Spain, A Coruña, Playa de Santa Cristina, during the Lloret del Mar music festival, where Andrea announced this concert would be the final gig of the tour.

== Opening acts ==
- Dakota Moon (3–22 December 1998)
- Picturehouse (14 January–1 February 1999)
- Babel Fish (3–8 February 1999)
- Brian Kennedy (20–26 February 1999)
- An Pierlé (Amsterdam)
- Catie Curtis (Alexandria, Chicago, West Hollywood and Solana Beach)
- Michelle Lewis (New York, Roseland Ballroom)

== Tour dates ==
List of 1997 concerts
Date	City	Country	Venue
17 November 1997	Ghent	Belgium	Vooruit
18 November 1997	Amsterdam	Netherlands	Melkweg
19 November 1997	Copenhagen	Denmark	Vega Musikkens Hus
21 November 1997	Hamburg	Germany	Große Freiheit 36
23 November 1997	Cologne	Germany	E-Werk
24 November 1997	Munich	Germany	Incognito
25 November 1997	Zürich	Switzerland	Jail
26 November 1997	Milan	Italy	Magazzini Generali
28 November 1997	Barcelona	Spain	Sala Razzmatazz
29 November 1997	Madrid	Spain	Sala Macumba
30 November 1997	Pamplona	Spain	Pabellón Anaitasuna
2 December 1997	London	England	Shepherd's Bush Empire
3 December 1997	Paris	France	L'Olympia
6 December 1997	Belfast	Northern Ireland	Whitla Hall
7 December 1997	Belfast	Northern Ireland	Whitla Hall
8 December 1997	Dublin	Ireland	Olympia Theatre
9 December 1997	Dublin	Ireland	Olympia Theatre
11 December 1997	London	England	The Forum
14 December 1997	Oslo	Norway	Oslo Spektrum
15 December 1997	Stockholm	Sweden	Münchenbryggeriet

List of 1998 concerts
Date	City	Country	Venue
4 February 1998	Perth	Australia	Perth Entertainment Centre
6 February 1998	Adelaide	Australia	Adelaide Entertainment Centre
7 February 1998	Melbourne	Australia	Centre Court
9 February 1998	Brisbane	Australia	Brisbane Entertainment Centre
11 February 1998	Sydney	Australia	State Theatre
12 February 1998	Sydney	Australia	State Theatre
13 February 1998	Sydney	Australia	State Theatre
14 February 1998	Sydney	Australia	State Theatre
15 February 1998	Sydney	Australia	State Theatre
16 February 1998	Sydney	Australia	State Theatre
17 February 1998	Sydney	Australia	State Theatre
18 February 1998	Newcastle	Australia	Newcastle Entertainment Centre
19 February 1998	Canberra	Australia	Royal Theatre
21 February 1998	Launceston	Australia	Silverdome
23 February 1998	Wellington	New Zealand	Queens Wharf Events Centre
25 February 1998	Auckland	New Zealand	ASB Auditorium
26 February 1998	Auckland	New Zealand	ASB Auditorium
8 March 1998	Madrid	Spain	Stage 40
12 March 1998	Cardiff	Wales	St David's Hall
13 March 1998	York	England	Barbican Centre
14 March 1998	Manchester	England	Manchester Apollo
16 March 1998	Birmingham	England	Symphony Hall
17 March 1998	London	England	Royal Albert Hall
18 March 1998	Nottingham	England	Nottingham Royal Concert Hall
20 March 1998	Glasgow	Scotland	Glasgow Royal Concert Hall
22 March 1998	Sheffield	England	Sheffield City Hall
23 March 1998	Northampton	England	Derngate Theatre
24 March 1998	Croydon	England	Fairfield Concert Hall
5 April 1998	Bangkok	Thailand	Thailand Cultural Centre
6 April 1998	Bangkok	Thailand	Thailand Cultural Centre
7 April 1998	Bangkok	Thailand	Thailand Cultural Centre
8 April 1998	Bangkok	Thailand	Thailand Cultural Centre
11 April 1998	Central Area	Singapore	Sparks
12 April 1998	Petaling Jaya	Malaysia	Sunway Lagoon
14 April 1998	Kuala Lumpur	Malaysia	Concorde Ballroom
15 April 1998	Makati	Philippines	Fashion Café
16 April 1998	Mandaluyong	Philippines	SM Megamall
17 April 1998	Makati	Philippines	Fashion Café
25 May 1998	Stuttgart	Germany	Kongresshalle
27 May 1998	Frankfurt	Germany	Hugenottenhalle
28 May 1998	Hamburg	Germany	CCH Hall 3
30 May 1998	Cologne	Germany	E-Werk
5 June 1998	Portsmouth	England	Portsmouth Guildhall
6 June 1998^{[B]}^{[C]}	London	England	Finsbury Park
6 June 1998^{[B]}^{[C]}	Epsom	England	Epsom Downs Racecourse
13 June 1998^{[D]}	New York City	United States	Downing Stadium
17 June 1998	Alexandria	United States	The Birchmere
18 June 1998	Chicago	United States	House of Blues
20 June 1998^{[D]}	Arlington Heights	United States	Arlington International Racecourse
28 June 1998^{[D]}	San Jose	United States	Spartan Stadium
29 June 1998	West Hollywood	United States	The Troubadour
30 June 1998	Solana Beach	United States	Belly Up Tavern
3 July 1998^{[E]}	Baden-Baden	Germany	SWF Studios
4 July 1998^{[F]}	Östersund	Sweden	Storsjöteatern
5 July 1998^{[G]}^{[H]}	Odense	Denmark	Roskilde Dyrskueplads
5 July 1998^{[G]}^{[H]}	London	England	Hyde Park
8 July 1998	Luxembourg	Luxembourg	Den Atelier
11 July 1998^{[I]}	Balingen	Germany	Balinger Messegelände
12 July 1998^{[J]}	Escalarre	Spain	Vall d'Àneu
15 July 1998^{[K]}	Montreux	Switzerland	Miles Davis Hall
16 July 1998^{[B]}	Milan	Italy	Arena Civica
17 July 1998^{[L]}	Zeebrugge	Belgium	Zeebrugge Beach
19 July 1998^{[M]}	Bern	Switzerland	Gurten Summit
21 July 1998^{[N]}	Lyon	France	Théâtre antique de Lyon
5 August 1998^{[O]}	Budapest	Hungary	Óbuda Island
18 August 1998^{[P]}	Bournemouth	England	Bournemouth Pier
21 August 1998^{[Q]}	Sopot	Poland	Forest Opera
21 September 1998^{[R]}	Kuala Lumpur	Malaysia	Stadium Nasional
7 October 1998	New York City	United States	Mercury Lounge
8 October 1998	Philadelphia	United States	Theatre of the Living Arts
14 October 1998	Montreal	Canada	Cabaret Music-Hall
18 October 1998	Ottawa	Canada	Barrymore's Music Hall
20 October 1998	Pontiac	United States	7th House
22 October 1998	Chicago	United States	Park West
23 October 1998	Columbus	United States	Southern Theatre
25 October 1998	Alexandria	United States	The Birchmere
26 October 1998	Boston	United States	Paradise Rock Club
27 October 1998	Philadelphia	United States	Theatre of the Living Arts
27 October 1998	New York City	United States	Irving Plaza
30 October 1998	Halifax	Canada	Rebecca Cohn Auditorium
31 October 1998	St. John's	Canada	St. John's Arts and Culture Centre
27 November 1998	Barcelona	Spain	Palau Sant Jordi
28 November 1998	Leganés	Spain	Plaza de Toros La Cubierta
3 December 1998	Nottingham	England	Nottingham Royal Concert Hall
4 December 1998	Nottingham	England	Nottingham Royal Concert Hall
6 December 1998	Liverpool	England	Liverpool Empire Theatre
7 December 1998	Manchester	England	Manchester Apollo
8 December 1998	Manchester	England	Manchester Apollo
10 December 1998	Glasgow	Scotland	Clyde Auditorium
11 December 1998	Glasgow	Scotland	Clyde Auditorium
13 December 1998	Birmingham	England	NEC Arena
14 December 1998	London	England	Wembley Arena
15 December 1998	Brighton	England	Brighton Centre
17 December 1998	Bournemouth	England	Windsor Hall
18 December 1998	Cardiff	Wales	Cardiff International Arena
20 December 1998	Manchester	England	Manchester Apollo
21 December 1998	Birmingham	England	NEC Arena
22 December 1998	Birmingham	England	NEC Arena

List of 1999 concerts
Date	City	Country	Venue
14 January 1999	Belfast	Northern Ireland	Kings Hall
15 January 1999	Dublin	Ireland	Point Theatre
16 January 1999	Dublin	Ireland	Point Theatre
18 January 1999	Cardiff	Wales	Cardiff International Arena
19 January 1999	Cardiff	Wales	Cardiff International Arena
21 January 1999	London	England	Wembley Arena
22 January 1999	London	England	Wembley Arena
23 January 1999	Birmingham	England	National Exhibition Centre
25 January 1999	Clyst St Mary	England	Westpoint Arena
26 January 1999	Clyst St Mary	England	Westpoint Arena
27 January 1999	London	England	Wembley Arena
29 January 1999	Sheffield	England	Sheffield Arena
30 January 1999	Newcastle	England	Telewest Arena
31 January 1999	Edinburgh	Scotland	Royal Highland Centre
1 February 1999	Manchester	England	Manchester Evening News Arena
3 February 1999	Paris	France	Zénith de Paris
4 February 1999	Utrecht	Netherlands	Muziekcentrum Vredenburg
6 February 1999	Stockholm	Sweden	Stockholm Globe Arena
8 February 1999	Hamburg	Germany	Alsterdorfer Sporthalle
20 February 1999	London	England	London Arena
21 February 1999	Birmingham	England	NEC Arena
22 February 1999	London	England	Wembley Arena
24 February 1999	Birmingham	England	NEC Arena
25 February 1999	Sheffield	England	Sheffield Arena
26 February 1999	Glasgow	Scotland	Scottish Exhibition and Conference Centre
9 March 1999	Washington, D.C.	United States	9:30 Club
17 March 1999	New York City	United States	Roseland Ballroom
19 March 1999	Boston	United States	Avalon Ballroom
21 March 1999	Chicago	United States	Park West
25 March 1999	San Francisco	United States	The Fillmore
28 March 1999	West Hollywood	United States	House of Blues
19 May 1999^{[A]}	Madrid	Spain	Círculo de Bellas Artes
30 May 1999^{[S]}	Nottingham	England	Wollaton Park
27 June 1999^{[T]}	Pilton	England	Worthy Farm
2 July 1999^{[V]}	Skellefteå	Sweden	Möjligheternas torg
4 July 1999^{[H]}	London	England	Hyde Park
10 July 1999^{[W]}	Paris	France	Hippodrome de Longchamps
17 July 1999	Dublin	Ireland	Lansdowne Road
31 July 1999^{[U]}	A Coruña	Spain	Playa de Santa Cristina

Festivals and other miscellaneous performances

^{A} Concierto Básico 40
^{B} Fleadh Festival
^{C} Derby Day Picnic
^{D} Guinness Fleadh Music Festival
^{E} Ohne Filter
^{F} Storsjöyran
^{G} Midtfyns Festival
^{H} Party in the Park
^{I} Balinger Open Air
^{J} Doctor Music Festival
^{K} Montreux Jazz Festival
^{L} Axion Beach Rock
^{M} Gurtenfestival
^{N} Nuits de Fourvière
^{O} Sziget Festival
^{P} Radio 1 Roadshow
^{Q} Sopot International Song Festival
^{R} XVI Commonwealth Games Closing Ceremony
^{S} City in the Park
^{T} Glastonbury Festival
^{U} Xacobeo '99
^{V} Stadsfesten Skellefteå
^{W} Solidays

Cancellations and rescheduled shows

22 February 1998	Hobart, Australia	Derwent Entertainment Centre	Cancelled
7 February 1999	Copenhagen, Denmark	Forum Copenhagen	Cancelled
1 July 1999	A Coruña, Spain	Playa de Santa Cristina	Rescheduled to 31 July 1999

== Personnel ==
Band

- Andrea Corr (lead vocals, tin whistle)
- Sharon Corr (violin, keyboards, vocals)
- Caroline Corr (drums, bodhran, piano, vocals)
- Jim Corr (guitars, keyboards, vocals)
- Keith Duffy (bass)
- Anthony Drennan (lead guitar)
- Conor Brady (lead guitar) (replaced Anto during the Genesis tour; 1997–1998)

Management & Agents

- John Hughes (manager)
- Emma Hill (management assistant)
- John Giddings at Solo (international agent)
- Barry Gaster (Irish agent)
- Dominic Kelly (accountant)

The Crew

- Henry McGroggan (tour manager)
- Aiden Lee (production manager)
- Brian Osmond (stage manager)
- Max Bisgrove (sound engineer)
- Paul 'Mini' Moore (monitor engineer)
- Liam McCarthy (lighting designer)
- Craig Mcdonald (lighting technician)
- Ray Whelan (lighting technician)
- Declan Hogan (drum technician)
- John Parsons (guitar technician)
- Oisin Murray (midi technician)
- Bob O'Brian (violin technician)
- Marianne Neil (wardrob)
- Jay Mascrey (makeup)
