= List of awards and nominations received by the Corrs =

The Corrs awards and nominations
Awards and nominations
Award	Wins	Nominations

Totals (Note: Certain award groups do not simply award one winner. They acknowledge several different recipients, have runners-up, and have third place. Since this is a specific recognition and is different from losing an award, runner-up mentions are considered wins in this award tally. For simplification and to avoid errors, each award in this list has been presumed to have had a prior nomination.)
- Wins: 26
- Nominations: 51

The Corrs have won 24 awards out 48 nominations over their career. Their awards are predominantly in pop and Rock genre categories. There have been many controversial categories the band have been nominated in including Billboard awards' Jazz Act, considering the band are not Jazz, or nominated as a female group considering the band consist of male and females.

One of their most significant achievements occurred at the 1999 BRIT Awards, where they won the award for Best International Group. This cemented their status as one of the biggest acts in the UK and Europe at the time.

In terms of global recognition, the band has been nominated for two Grammy Awards. In 2001, they received a nomination for Best Pop Performance by a Duo or Group with Vocal for their hit "Breathless," and their track "Rebel Heart" was nominated for Best Pop Instrumental Performance.

== Awards and nominations ==
Award	Year	Nominee(s)	Category	Result	Ref.
Amadeus Austrian Music Awards	2001	The Corrs	International Pop/Rock Group	Nominated	
BMI London Awards	2001	"Breathless"	Pop Award	Won	
BMI Pop Awards	2002	"Breathless"	Award-Winning Song	Won	
Echo Music Prize	2001	The Corrs	Best International Group	Nominated	
Hit Awards	2001	The Corrs	International Group	Nominated	
My VH1 Music Awards	2000	The Corrs	Best-Kept Secret	Won	
NRJ Music Awards	2000	The Corrs	International Duo/Group of the Year	Nominated	
NRJ Music Awards	2001	The Corrs	International Duo/Group of the Year	Won	
NRJ Music Awards	2001	The Corrs	Music Website of the Year	Nominated	
Online Music Awards	2000	The Corrs	Favorite Group	Won	
Online Music Awards	2000	The Corrs Corral	Best Fan Site	Nominated	
TMF Awards	2001	The Corrs	Best Live International	Nominated	

== APRA Music Awards ==
The APRA Music Awards are several award ceremonies run in Australia by Australian Performing Right Association to recognise songwriting skills, sales and airplay performance by its members annually. The Corrs were nominated along with Robert "Mutt" Lange for Most Performed Foreign Work with "Breathless".

Year	Recipient	Award	Result
2001	"Breathless"	Most Performed Foreign Work	Nominated

== Big Buzz Awards ==
=== Big Buzz Awards ===
Year	Recipient	Award	Result
2004	The Corrs	Best Irish Pop Act	Won

=== Pepsi Award ===
Year	Recipient	Award	Result
2005	The Corrs	Best Irish Act	Won

== Billboard Music Video Awards ==
The Billboard Music Awards is sponsored by Billboard Magazine and is held annually in December. The Billboard Year-End Charts Awards are based on sales data by Nielsen SoundScan and radio information by Nielsen Broadcast Data Systems.

Year	Recipient	Award	Result
1998	"Dreams"	Best New Clip	Nominated
1998	The Corrs	Best Jazz Act	Nominated
2000	The Corrs	Best Jazz Act	Nominated
2001	"All The Love in The World"	Best Adult Contemporary Clip of the Year	Nominated

== BRIT Awards ==
The BRIT Awards are the British Phonographic Industry's annual pop music awards

Year	Recipient	Award	Result
1999	The Corrs	Best International Group	Won
2001	The Corrs	Best International Group	Nominated

== Capital FM's London Awards ==
Year	Recipient	Award	Result
2000	The Corrs	London's Favourite International Group	Won
2001	The Corrs	London's Favourite International Group	Nominated
2001	The Corrs	Best International Group	Won

== CARA Awards ==
Year	Recipient	Award	Result
1993	The Corrs	Best Newcomer	Won

== Grammy Awards ==
The Grammy Awards are held annually by the National Academy of Recording Arts and Sciences.

Year	Recipient	Award	Result
2001	"Breathless"	Best Pop Performance By a Duo/Group	Nominated
2001	"Rebel Heart"	Best Pop Instrumental Performance	Nominated

== Heineken Hot Press Rock Awards ==
Year	Recipient	Award	Result
1999	The Corrs	Best Irish Band	Won
1999	The Corrs: Live at Lansdowne Road	Best Live Performance in Ireland by an Irish Act	Won
1999	Talk On Corners	Best Irish Album	Nominated
1999	The Corrs	Best Pop Act	Nominated
1999	Andrea Corr	Best Female Singer	Won

== HMV Awards ==
Year	Recipient	Award	Result
1998	The Corrs	Best Pop Act	Won

== Hot Press Irish Music Awards ==
Year	Recipient	Award	Result
2002	The Corrs	Best Pop Act	Won
2002	John Hughes	Industry Awards	Won
2002	Caroline Corr	Rory Gallagher Musician Awards	Won

== Irish National Entertainment Awards ==
Year	Recipient	Award	Result
1998	The Corrs	Popular Music	Won

== Irish World Awards ==
Year	Recipient	Award	Result
2003	The Corrs	Best International Pop Act	Won

== IRMA Music Awards ==
Year	Recipient	Award	Result
1996	The Corrs	Best New Irish Act	Won
2002	Talk on Corners	Best Irish Pop Album	Nominated
2002	The Corrs	Best Irish Pop Act	Nominated

== Ivor Novello Awards ==
Year	Recipient	Award	Result
1999	"What Can I Do?"	Best Contemporary Song	Nominated

== M6 Awards ==
Year	Recipient	Award	Result
2000	The Corrs	Best International Female Artist	Nominated

== Meteor Ireland Music Awards ==
A Meteor Ireland Music Award is an accolade bestowed upon professionals in the music industry in Ireland and further afield. Apart from 2011, they have been bestowed each year since 2001, replacing the IRMA Ireland Music Awards held in the 1990s.

Year	Recipient	Award	Result
2005	The Corrs	Best Irish Pop Act	Nominated
2005	John Hughes	Industry Award	Won
2006	The Corrs	Best Irish Band	Nominated

== Nokia TMF Awards ==
Year	Recipient	Award	Result
2001	The Corrs	Best Live Act	Nominated

== Amigo Awards ==
Year	Recipient	Award	Result
1997	Forgiven, Not Forgotten	Best International Album	Won
1998	Talk on Corners	Best International Album	Won
1998	The Corrs	Best International Group	Won
2000	The Corrs	Best International Group	Nominated

== Ondas Awards ==
Year	Nominee / work	Award	Result	Ref.
2004	The Corrs	Special Jury Award	Won	

== Q Awards ==
Year	Recipient	Award	Result
1998	Talk On Corners	Best Album	Nominated

== Singapore Radio Music Awards ==
Year	Recipient	Award	Result
2000	The Corrs	Best Pop Group	Won
2001	The Corrs	Best Pop Group	Nominated

== Smash Hits Poll Winners Party ==
Year	Recipient	Award	Result	Ref.
2000	The Corrs	Best Non-British Band	Nominated	

== TMF Awards ==
Year	Recipient	Award	Result
2002	The Corrs	Best International Pop Group	Nominated

== World Music Awards ==
The World Music Awards is an international awards show founded in 1989 that annually honors recording artists based on worldwide sales figures provided by the International Federation of the Phonographic Industry (IFPI).

Year	Recipient	Award	Result
1999	The Corrs	World's Biggest-Selling Irish Act	Won
