= Talk on Corners =

Studio album by the Corrs
- Released: 17 October 1997
- Recorded: July 1996 – May 1997
- Studios: Ollywood (Hollywood); Chartmaker (Malibu); Westland (Dublin); Rafelson Recording (Los Angeles); Peak (Dublin); Record Plant (Los Angeles); Mulhulland (Los Angeles); A&M (Hollywood); Aerowave (Los Angeles); Windmill Lane (Dublin)
- Genres: Pop rock; folk; Celtic fusion
- Length: 56:58
- Labels: 143; Lava; Atlantic
- Producers: Glen Ballard; Jim Corr; David Foster; John Hughes; Oliver Leiber; Rick Nowels; Billy Steinberg

The Corrs chronology
Forgiven, Not Forgotten (1995)	Talk on Corners (1997)	The Corrs Unplugged (1999)

Singles from Talk on Corners
- 1. "Only When I Sleep" Released: September 1997; 2. "I Never Loved You Anyway" Released: December 1997; 3. "What Can I Do" Released: January 1998; 4. "Dreams" Released: May 1998; 5. "What Can I Do (Tin Tin Out Remix)" Released: 17 August 1998; 6. "So Young (K-Klass Remix)" Released: November 1998

Talk on Corners is the second studio album by Irish family pop rock band the Corrs. It was released on 17 October 1997 by 143, Lava and Atlantic Records. Preceded by lead single "Only When I Sleep", which became a top ten hit internationally, the album was an immediate commercial success in several territories, including Ireland, Spain, Sweden, Denmark, Australia, New Zealand and Japan. Its commercial performance elsewhere was initially modest, however.

The Corrs' entire concert from the Royal Albert Hall was broadcast live the following year on BBC One on Saint Patrick's Day, where they were joined during their performance of "Dreams" by Fleetwood Mac drummer Mick Fleetwood. This event did much to raise the band's international profile. A remixed version of "Dreams" went on to become their first top ten hit on the UK Singles Chart. The record was reissued the following month to include the song as a bonus track. This would be the first of several different editions of Talk on Corners to be released over the album's two-year-long promotional cycle.

Over this period, the band released a string of increasingly successful hit singles, culminating with a Tin Tin Out remix of "Runaway" peaking at number two in the UK. The Corrs also toured extensively to promote the record: the Talk on Corners World Tour saw them perform almost 160 concerts across twelve separate legs. The album spent ten weeks at number one in the UK. It ended its run as the highest-selling album of the year, and remains one of the best-selling albums of all time there, as well as the highest-selling album ever by an Irish act.

== Background and recording ==
The Corrs began work on new material in California in July 1996, initially under the supervision of producer David Foster. Lead vocalist Andrea Corr has described the making of Talk on Corners as being "a struggle", with the band put under pressure by Atlantic Records to deliver a successful follow-up to their 1995 debut album Forgiven, Not Forgotten. Their manager John Hughes cited second album syndrome as a common source of pressure for all recording artists, but said further demands came from the label, who were concerned that none of the songs they were being presented with seemed like potential hit singles. The label disliked "What Can I Do" and "So Young", particularly the latter, and the band had to fight hard for their inclusion on the album.

Additional co-writers and producers were brought in to help improve the album's hit potential, including Carole Bayer Sager, Glen Ballard, Oliver Leiber, Rick Nowels and Billy Steinberg. The use of different producers on different tracks introduced further difficulties: the band found it hard to achieve consistency throughout the entire album, although this would be remedied by the Corrs using over forty hours of studio time to record overdubs. In May 1997, the finalised album was delivered to Atlantic, who were unimpressed by the material and ordered the band to continue recording new tracks. When they refused, the label threatened to sue the band for breach of contract. This dispute was only resolved when John Hughes signed a contract guaranteeing future album sales, with the manager being held personally liable if Talk on Corners failed to yield a profit for Atlantic.

== Composition and style ==
Talk on Corners is predominantly a pop rock album, although it also incorporates elements of Celtic and traditional Irish music. Andrea Corr was the album's primary lyricist, co-writing numerous songs with established composers and producers: she co-wrote "Queen of Hollywood" with Glen Ballard, best known for co-writing Michael Jackson's "Man in the Mirror" (1987) as well as for co-writing and producing the Alanis Morissette album Jagged Little Pill (1995). "Intimacy" was co-written by Pat Benatar guitarist Neil Giraldo, and Billy Steinberg—the writer of hit singles including Madonna's "Like a Virgin" (1984) and "Eternal Flame" by the Bangles (1989). Several songs on the record were co-written and produced by Oliver Leiber, the son of composer Jerry Leiber, who, alongside Mike Stoller, co-wrote some of the biggest hits of the '50s and '60s, including Elvis Presley's "Hound Dog" (1953) and "Jailhouse Rock" (1957) as well as Ben E. King's "Stand by Me" (1961). Their cover of the Jimi Hendrix song "Little Wing" features Irish folk collective the Chieftains. The album's title is derived from a lyric in the song "Queen of Hollywood".

== Critical reception ==
Professional ratings
Review scores
Source	Rating
AllMusic	4/5 stars
Rolling Stone	3/5 stars

The record received generally positive reviews from music critics. AllMusic writer Becky Byrkit rated it four stars out of five and praised the band for their vocal harmonies, as well as the album's consistency, writing that "each and every cut sounds wired for radio play". She highlighted their cover of "Little Wing" as being the album's "best and most spirited Celtic cut". Stephen Segerman of South African music magazine Rock rated the album eight out of ten, and complimented it for incorporating a "fuller and rockier atmosphere [than Forgiven, Not Forgotten]". He also praised the record for containing "generous sprinklings of traditional Irish sounds and touches", which he said helped enhance the material.

The special edition of the album received mixed reviews from the American music press. James Hunter of Rolling Stone criticised Ballard's production on "Queen of Hollywood" for "forcing an Alanis-like edge where it's unneeded", and called the David Foster-produced tracks "goofy", but said that, "otherwise, this is a high-flying reintroduction to some blue chip popsters." A writer for People was critical of the re-release, as well as the remixed tracks, calling it "A collection of pretty, pop-lite tunes that could use more Celtic flavoring and less studio gloss, the album is best when harking back to the sounds of the Old Sod: reeling fiddles, soaring harmonies and the haunting tin whistle played by sister Andrea. Her lead vocals are as pretty to listen to as she and her sisters are to look at, but the string-sweetened arrangements are as bland and flat as a Dublin car park."

British rock magazine NME have retrospectively been highly critical of the album, placing it at number three in their 2014 list of "25 unfathomably popular albums of the 90's". The album also appeared in a 2016 article titled "8 of the all-time best-selling albums in the UK [which] have no redeeming features whatsoever". In contrast, The Independent included it in their 2024 list of 20 most underrated albums ever at number 10, comparing it favourably to Come On Over (1997) by Shania Twain.

== Release and commercial performance ==
The original edition of the album was released internationally on 17 October 1997, and was an immediate commercial success in several territories. Within five months of release, Talk on Corners had sold over a million copies worldwide, and was certified sextuple platinum in their home country, as well as double platinum in Australia and Spain, platinum in Denmark and New Zealand, and gold in both Japan and Sweden. Its commercial success elsewhere was initially modest, however, with the album debuting at number 23 in France and at number 56 in Germany. In the UK, it debuted at number 7, but would fall out of the top forty there within a month of release. "Only When I Sleep" and "I Never Loved You Anyway" were released as the album's first two singles, with the former becoming a top ten hit in Ireland, while both songs peaked within the top forty of the Australian Singles Chart. "What Can I Do" was released as the album's third single, and also went on to be a top forty hit in Ireland. All three singles failed to reach the top forty of the UK Singles Chart.

Fleetwood Mac drummer Mick Fleetwood joined the band at their concert in the Royal Albert Hall on 17 March 1998 during their performance of "Dreams", which the band had recently contributed to the album Legacy: A Tribute to Fleetwood Mac's Rumours. The entire concert was broadcast live on BBC One as part of that organisation's coverage of Saint Patrick's Day, and the event did much to raise the band's profile. The cover would become the Corrs' first top forty hit in the UK, after it peaked at number six. The following month, Talk on Corners was reissued in numerous territories with "Dreams" included as a bonus track, and the album finally peaked at number one in the UK on 21 June 1998, its 35th week on the chart. This edition of the album was the first to be released in the United States. It was released on 5 May, and peaked at number 17 on Billboard's Top Heatseekers Albums. The Corrs: Live at the Royal Albert Hall was released in August.

=== Talk on Corners: Special Edition ===
A special edition of the record was released internationally on 9 November 1998. This revised edition contained five remixed tracks, several of which were then released or re-released as singles. The previously released remix of "Dreams" by Todd Terry was included, along with a previously unreleased K-Klass remix of "So Young" (released as a single the following week), as well as an alternate mix of "I Never Loved You Anyway". English electronic music duo Tin Tin Out remixed a further two tracks: "What Can I Do" (which had already been released as a single) and "Runaway"—a song from their debut album. Tin Tin Out enlisted European string ensemble the Duke Quartet to provide orchestration for both tracks. The former would go on to become the Corrs' first top three hit in the UK when it was released as a single, while the remix of "Runaway" became their highest-peaking single yet, after it peaked at number two behind Britney Spears' "...Baby One More Time". "Dreams" and "So Young" have been certified silver by the BPI for sales in excess of 200,000 copies each, while "What Can I Do" and "Runaway" were certified gold for sales of over 400,000 copies each. As of 2017, "What Can I Do" had sold 351,000 copies in the UK.

Following the success of the album in Europe and Australasia, an abridged version of the special edition was released in the US on 16 February 1999, and peaked at number 72 on the Billboard 200. To promote this edition, the band performed as the opening act on several dates of The Rolling Stones' No Security Tour, as well as their own national concert tour and appearances on numerous talk shows: including Saturday Night Live, The Rosie O'Donnell Show, The Tonight Show with Jay Leno and the Late Show with David Letterman. The Corrs: Live at the Royal Albert Hall was repeatedly aired on PBS.

This edition was the highest-selling incarnation of the album in several territories. Talk on Corners would go on to spend a total of ten weeks at number one on the UK Albums Chart. On its final week atop the chart there, on the chart dated 4 April 1999, Forgiven, Not Forgotten reached a new peak of number two. It ended 1998 as the UK's highest-selling album, and was also the eighth highest-selling album of 1999. As of 2022, Talk on Corners has sold over 2.97 million copies in the UK, and remains the highest-selling album of all time by an Irish act there, as well as one of the best-selling albums of all time in the country.

Similarly, it was certified 20× platinum in Ireland, indicating shipments in excess of 300,000 units, and remains the highest-certified album of all time there, as well as the twelfth best-selling album ever. In 2001, the record was certified sextuple platinum by the International Federation of the Phonographic Industry for shipments in excess of 6 million units throughout Europe.

== Track listing ==
All tracks are written by the Corrs, except where noted.

Talk on Corners track listing
No.	Title	Writer(s)	Producer(s)	Length
1.	"Only When I Sleep"	Andrea Corr; Sharon Corr; Caroline Corr; Jim Corr; Oliver Leiber; Paul Peterson; John Shanks	Leiber	4:24
2.	"When He's Not Around"		David Foster	4:25
3.	"Dreams" (re-release bonus track)	Stevie Nicks	Leiber; Peter Rafelson^{[a]}	4:01
4.	"What Can I Do"		Jim Corr	4:18
5.	"I Never Loved You Anyway"	The Corrs; Carole Bayer Sager	Foster	4:27
6.	"So Young"		Jim Corr; Leiber	3:53
7.	"Don't Say You Love Me"	The Corrs; Bayer Sager	Foster	4:39
8.	"Love Gives, Love Takes"	The Corrs; Dane Deviller; Sean Hosein; Leiber; Stacey Piersa; Elliot Wolff	Leiber	3:42
9.	"Hopelessly Addicted"	The Corrs; Leiber; Shanks	Leiber	4:03
10.	"Paddy McCarthy" (instrumental)		Jim Corr; Leo Pearson^{[a]}; Larry Robinson^{[b]}	4:58
11.	"Intimacy"	Neil Giraldo; Rick Nowels; Billy Steinberg	Nowels; Steinberg	3:57
12.	"Queen of Hollywood"	The Corrs; Glen Ballard; Deviller; Hosein	Ballard; Deviller^{[a]}; Hosein^{[a]}	5:02
13.	"No Good for Me"		Foster	4:00
14.	"Little Wing"	Jimi Hendrix	John Hughes	5:08
Total length:				60:59

Talk on Corners – Japanese bonus tracks
No.	Title	Writer(s)	Producer(s)	Length
15.	"Remember"		Foster; The Corrs	4:04
16.	"What I Know"	Ballard; Siedah Garrett	Ballard	3:49
17.	"Dreams" (Tee's radio mix)	Nicks	Leiber; Rafelson; Todd Terry^{[c]}	3:54
Total length:				72:46

Talk on Corners – Tour edition bonus tracks
No.	Title	Producer(s)	Length
15.	"Runaway"	Foster; Jim Corr^{[a]}	4:27
16.	"Forgiven, Not Forgotten"	Foster; Jim Corr^{[a]}	4:18
Total length:			69:44

Talk on Corners – Tour edition (bonus disc)
No.	Title	Writer(s)	Producer(s)	Length
1.	"I Never Loved You Anyway" (acoustic version)	The Corrs; Bayer Sager		3:25
2.	"The Right Time" (live in Denmark, July 1996)		Torben Schmidt	4:34
3.	"Queen of Hollywood" (live at The Royal Albert Hall, London, March 1998)	The Corrs; Ballard; Deviller; Hosein	Janet Fraser-Crook; Mark Cooper; Ray Still	5:11
4.	"Toss the Feathers" (live in Dublin, Ireland)	Traditional (arranged by The Corrs)		3:56
5.	"Closer" (live in Melbourne, Australia, February 1997)		Paul Petran	4:29
Total length:				21:35

Talk on Corners – International special edition
No.	Title	Producer(s)	Length
1.	"What Can I Do" (Tin Tin Out remix)	Jim Corr; Tin Tin Out^{[b]}	4:17
2.	"So Young" (K-Klass remix)	Jim Corr; Leiber; K-Klass^{[c]}	4:14
3.	"Only When I Sleep"	Leiber	4:23
4.	"When He's Not Around"	Foster	4:24
5.	"Dreams" (Tee's radio mix)	Leiber; Rafelson^{[a]}; Todd Terry^{[c]}	3:52
6.	"I Never Loved You Anyway"	Foster; Leiber^{[c]}; Rob Chiarelli^{[c]}	4:26
7.	"Don't Say You Love Me"	Foster	4:39
8.	"Love Gives Love Takes"	Leiber	3:42
9.	"Runaway" (Tin Tin Out remix)	Foster; Jim Corr^{[a]}; Tin Tin Out^{[b]}	4:35
10.	"Hopelessly Addicted"	Leiber	4:03
11.	"Paddy McCarthy" (instrumental)	Jim Corr; Pearson^{[a]}; Robinson^{[b]}	4:58
12.	"Intimacy"	Nowels; Steinberg	3:57
13.	"Queen of Hollywood"	Ballard; Deviller^{[a]}; Hosein^{[a]}	5:02
14.	"No Good for Me"	Foster	4:00
15.	"Little Wing"	Hughes	5:08
Total length:			64:54

Talk on Corners – US special edition
No.	Title	Length
1.	"What Can I Do?" (Tin Tin Out remix)	4:17
2.	"Only When I Sleep"	4:23
3.	"So Young" (K-Klass remix)	4:14
4.	"Dreams" (Tee's radio mix)	3:52
5.	"Runaway" (Tin Tin Out remix)	4:35
6.	"I Never Loved You Anyway" (alternate version)	3:40
7.	"Paddy McCarthy" (instrumental)	4:58
8.	"Queen of Hollywood"	5:02
9.	"Hopelessly Addicted"	4:03
10.	"When He's Not Around"	4:24
11.	"No Good for Me"	4:00
12.	"Little Wing"	5:08
Total length:		52:36

Notes

- ^{^[a]} signifies a co-producer.
- ^{^[b]} signifies an additional producer.
- ^{^[c]} signifies a remixer.

== Personnel ==
Credits adapted from the liner notes of Talk of Corners.

- Recorded at Peak Studios, Westland Studios and Windmill Lane Studios in Dublin, Ireland; Ollywood Studios in Hollywood; Chartmaker, Inc. Studio in Malibu; A&M Studios, Aerowave Studio, Mulhulland Studio, Rafelson Recording Studio and the Record Plant in Los Angeles between July 1996 and May 1997.
- All songs mixed by Bob Clearmountain, except: "Dreams" mixed by Rob Chiarelli and "Don't Say You Love Me" mixed by Mick Guzauski.
- Mastered by Bob Ludwig at Gateway Mastering Studios.

The Corrs

- Andrea Corr – lead vocals, tin whistle, arrangements
- Sharon Corr – violin, backing vocals, arrangements
- Caroline Corr – drums, bodhrán, backing vocals, arrangements
- Jim Corr – guitars, keyboards, accordion, piano, backing vocals, arrangements, programming, production

Musicians

- Matt Chamberlain – drums (track 12)
- Luis Conte – percussion (track 11)
- Dane Deviller – guitars, programming, engineering, co-production (track 12)
- Anthony Drennan – guitars (tracks 4, 6, 14)
- Keith Duffy – bass guitar (track 14)
- David Foster – synthesizer bass (track 11); keyboards, arrangements, production
- John Gilutin – keyboards (track 8)
- Sean Hosein – synthesizer, programming, engineering, co-production (track 12)
- Jeff Hull – keyboards, string arrangement and conduction (track 11)
- Suzy Katayama – cello (track 11)
- Matt Laug – drums (tracks 1, 8, 9)
- Oliver Leiber – guitars, programming, engineering, production
- Lance Morrison – bass guitar (track 8, 12)
- Rick Nowels – guitars, production (track 11)
- Dean Parks – guitars (tracks 8, 12)
- Paul Peterson – bass guitar and keyboards (tracks 1, 9)
- Tim Pierce – guitars (track 5, 13); mandolin (track 13)
- John Robinson – drums (tracks 5, 7, 13)
- John Shanks – guitars (tracks 1, 8, 9); electric mandolin (track 9)
- Michael Thompson – guitars (tracks 2, 7); organ (track 12)
- Lisa Wagner – cello (track 11)
- Gota Yashiki – drums (track 6)
- The Chieftains (on track 14):
- Derek Bell – harp
- Kevin Conneff – bodhrán
- Martin Fay – fiddle
- Seán Keane – fiddle
- Matt Molloy – flute
- Paddy Moloney – Celtic arrangement, uilleann pipes and tin whistle

Technical

- Glen Ballard – production (track 12)
- Philip Begley – engineering (track 3)
- George Black – programming (track 11)
- Blinkk – photography
- Bryan Carrigan – engineering (track 12)
- Felipe Elgueta – engineering, synth programming (tracks 2, 5, 7, 13)
- Chris Fogel – engineering (track 12)
- Stuart Grusin – Pro Tools (track 3)
- John Hughes – production (track 14)
- Yazuru Koyanazi – recording assistant (track 11)
- Al Lay – recording assistant (track 11)
- Tim Martin – engineering (track 14)
- Brian Masterson – engineering (track 14)
- Leo Pearson – co-production, engineering (track 10); programming (tracks 2, 4–6, 10)
- Peter Rafelson – co-production, programming (track 3)
- David Reitzaz – engineering (tracks 5, 7, 13)
- Colleen Reynolds – production coordinator (track 11)
- Larry Robinson – additional production (track 10)
- Brenda Rotheiser – art direction and design
- Barry Rudolph – engineering (tracks 1, 3, 6, 8, 9)
- Matt Silva – mix engineering (track 3)
- Billy Steinberg – production (track 11)
- Randall Wine – engineering (track 11)

== Charts ==
=== Weekly charts ===
Weekly chart performance for Talk on Corners
Chart (1997–1999)	Peak position
Australian Albums (ARIA)	3
Austrian Albums (Ö3 Austria)	9
Belgian Albums (Ultratop Flanders)	5
Belgian Albums (Ultratop Wallonia)	12
Canada Top Albums/CDs (RPM)	87
Dutch Albums (Album Top 100)	13
European Albums (Billboard)	3
Finnish Albums (Suomen virallinen lista)	2
French Albums (SNEP)	5
German Albums (Offizielle Top 100)	9
Irish Albums (IRMA)	1
Japanese Albums (Oricon)	28
Malaysian Albums (RIM)	1
New Zealand Albums (RMNZ)	1
Norwegian Albums (VG-lista)	2
Singaporean Albums (Music Weekly)	1
Spanish Albums (Promusicae)	5
Swedish Albums (Sverigetopplistan)	3
Swiss Albums (Schweizer Hitparade)	15
UK Albums (Official Charts)	1
US Billboard 200	72

=== Year-end charts ===
1997 year-end chart performance for Talk on Corners
Chart (1997)	Position
Australian Albums (ARIA)	34

1998 year-end chart performance for Talk on Corners
Chart (1998)	Position
Australian Albums (ARIA)	34
French Albums (SNEP)	44
German Albums (Offizielle Top 100)	56
Spanish Albums (Promusicae)	9
UK Albums (OCC)	1

1999 year-end chart performance for Talk on Corners
Chart (1999)	Position
Australian Albums (ARIA)	25
Belgian Albums (Ultratop Flanders)	40
Belgian Albums (Ultratop Wallonia)	39
Dutch Albums (MegaCharts)	55
French Albums (SNEP)	37
New Zealand Albums (RMNZ)	4
Norwegian Albums (VG-lista)	4
Spanish Albums (Promusicae)	35
UK Albums (OCC)	8

2000 year-end chart performance for Talk on Corners
Chart (2000)	Position
Belgian Albums (Ultratop Flanders)	92
Dutch Albums (MegaCharts)	66
UK Albums (OCC)	62

=== Decade-end charts ===
Decade-end chart performance for Talk on Corners
Chart (1990–1999)	Position
UK Albums (OCC)	4

== Certifications and sales ==
Certifications and sales for Talk on Corners
Region	Certification	Certified units/sales
Australia (ARIA)	5× Platinum	350,000^{^}
Belgium (BRMA)	Platinum	50,000^{*}
Canada (Music Canada)	Gold	50,000^{^}
Denmark (IFPI Danmark)	Platinum	50,000^{^}
Finland (Musiikkituottajat)	Gold	26,356
France (SNEP)	2× Platinum	200,000^{‡}
Germany (BVMI)	Gold	250,000^{^}
Ireland (IRMA)	20× Platinum	300,000^{^}
Italy (FIMI)	Platinum	100,000^{*}
Japan (RIAJ)	Gold	100,000^{^}
Malaysia	—	100,000
Netherlands (NVPI)	Gold	50,000^{^}
New Zealand (RMNZ)	6× Platinum	90,000^{^}
Norway (IFPI Norway)	Gold	25,000^{*}
Philippines	—	90,000
Spain (Promusicae)	6× Platinum	600,000^{^}
Sweden (GLF)	2× Platinum	160,000^{^}
Switzerland (IFPI Switzerland)	Gold	25,000^{^}
United Kingdom (BPI)	9× Platinum	2,970,000
United States (RIAA)	Gold	500,000^{^}
Summaries
Europe (IFPI)	6× Platinum	6,000,000^{*}
^{*} Sales figures based on certification alone.^{^} Shipments figures based on certification alone.^{‡} Sales+streaming figures based on certification alone.

== Release history ==
Release history and formats for Talk on Corners
Region	Date	Version	Format	Label	Catalog #
Ireland	17 October 1997	Original edition	CD; cassette	143; Atlantic; Lava Records	7567 83051–2
Germany	20 October 1997	Original edition	CD; cassette	143; Atlantic; Lava Records	7567 83051–2
Japan	29 October 1997	Original edition	CD; cassette	143; Atlantic; Lava Records	AMCY-2319
Australia	2 November 1997	Original edition	CD; cassette	143; Atlantic; Lava Records	83051-2
Worldwide	April 1998	1998 reissue (with "Dreams")	CD; cassette	143; Atlantic; Lava Records	83106-2
Worldwide	August 1998	Tour Edition	CD; cassette	143; Atlantic; Lava Records	80885-2
Worldwide	Special Edition	November 1998	CD; cassette	143; Atlantic; Lava Records	80917-2
North America			CD; cassette	143; Atlantic; Lava Records	
North America	Original Edition	9 June 1998	CD; cassette	143; Atlantic; Lava Records	83106-2P
Special Edition	16 February 1999	83164-2	CD; cassette	143; Atlantic; Lava Records	
