= Heart Like a Wheel (disambiguation) =

Heart Like a Wheel is a 1974 country rock album by American popular music recording artist Linda Ronstadt.

Heart Like a Wheel may also refer to:

- "Heart Like a Wheel", a 1974 song written by Canadian singer-songwriters Kate & Anna McGarrigle, from their first album Kate & Anna McGarrigle; it was also used by Linda Ronstadt as the title song for her 1974 album
  - "Heart Like a Wheel"/"Old Town", a 2006 double A-sided single by the Corrs, including a cover of the above song
- "Heart Like a Wheel", song from 1981 album Circle of Love by the Steve Miller Band
- Heart Like a Wheel (film), a 1983 American biographical film about drag racing driver Shirley "Cha Cha" Muldowney
- "Heart Like a Wheel", song from Black Sabbath's 1986 album Seventh Star
- "Heart Like a Wheel" (The Human League song), 1990
- "Heart Like a Wheel" (Eric Church song), off his 2018 album Desperate Man
