= I Know My Love =

1999 single by The Chieftains, with The Corrs

"I Know My Love" is a traditional Irish folk song, which was first collected by Herbert Hughes and published by Boosey & Hawkes in 1909, in Volume 1 of "Irish Country Songs" - although the song is likely to be considerably older than that. The book can be viewed or downloaded as a PDF here.

The song is about a woman's love for "an arrant rover" and her jealousy of his other women.

An early recording was done by Burl Ives on 3 March 1941 for his debut album Okeh Presents the Wayfaring Stranger.

It is best known as a single by Irish folk band the Chieftains with the Corrs, released in 1999, taken from their widely acclaimed album Tears of Stone.

Colin Wilkie and Shirley Hart recorded a version on their 1966 album Songs of Mother Ireland. James Yorkston and the Athletes also recorded a version of this song on their 2002 album Moving Up Country. Liz Madden recorded a new version on her 2010 album My Irish Home. Other artists having recorded the song include Pete Seeger, the Clancy Brothers, the Dubliners, Celtic Woman, Deirdre Shannon, John Doyle, Seamus Kennedy, and Salli Terri.

== The Chieftains version ==
"I Know My Love"

Single by The Chieftains featuring the Corrs

from the album Tears of Stone
- A-side: "I Know My Love"
- B-side: "Tears of Stone"
- Released: 24 May 1999 (UK)
- Recorded: 1997
- Genre: Folk
- Length: 3:11
- Label: BMG
- Songwriter(s): Traditional
- Producer(s): Paddy Moloney

The Corrs singles chronology
"Runaway (Remix)" (1999)	"I Know My Love" (1999)	"Lifting Me" (1999)

The Chieftains' version features guest artists the Corrs and had been recorded in 1997, while the Corrs were working on their second album Talk on Corners. At the time it was released, the Corrs were at the height of their popularity. For the single release, the track was remixed by producer Youth. The track was later included on the Corrs' 2006 compilation album Dreams: The Ultimate Corrs Collection.

=== Track listings ===
Europe/Mexico CD single

1. "I Know My Love" (radio edit) – 3:11
2. "I Know My Love" – 3:51

UK CD single

1. "I Know My Love" (Youth Rhythm remix)
2. "I Know My Love" (extended remix)
3. "Tears of Stone"
