= I Never Loved You Anyway =

1997 single by the Corrs

Single by the Corrs

from the album Talk on Corners
- B-side: "What I Know"
- Released: December 1997
- Studio: Chartmaker (Malibu, California)
- Genre: Pop rock
- Length: 3:53
- Label: 143; Atlantic; Lava
- Composers: The Corrs; Carole Bayer Sager
- Lyricists: Andrea Corr; Carole Bayer Sager
- Producer: David Foster

The Corrs singles chronology
"Only When I Sleep" (1997)	"I Never Loved You Anyway" (1997)	"What Can I Do" (1998)

"I Never Loved You Anyway" is a song by Irish band the Corrs, released in December 1997 by 143, Atlantic and Lava Records as the second single from their second album, Talk on Corners (1997). The music was written by the band with Carole Bayer Sager, who also wrote the lyrics alongside Andrea Corr. The song became a top-50 hit in Australia and the United Kingdom, as well as on the Canadian RPM Adult Contemporary chart. The track earned producer David Foster a nomination for Producer of the Year at the 1999 Juno Awards. Its accompanying music video was directed by Dani Jacobs.

== Critical reception ==
Larry Flick of Billboard magazine wrote, "Merging traditional Celtic music with pop/rock is tricky biz, but this act does so with deceptive ease—with a big thanks to kingpin producer David Foster; of course. 'I Never Loved You Anyway' oozes delicious cynicism, all while a shuffle beat propels an arrangement of Celtic instruments and acoustic guitars. A bit too sophisticated and smart for top 40, this is perfect for adult-oriented stations in need of something fresh and uptempo." British magazine Music Week gave the song a score of three out of five, adding, "The Irish sibling quartet are in Alisha's Attic territory here complete with tin whistle and bodhran break."

== Music video ==
The music video for "I Never Loved You Anyway" was shot in Ireland, at Dublins' Iveagh Market. The video presents the Corrs in a more casual setting compared to the more glam and stylish look of their previous video, "Only When I Sleep". The video was shot by director Dani Jacobs who would later go on to direct many of the Corrs' future videos, including "Dreams", "So Young", "Would You Be Happier?", and Andrea Corr's solo single "Shame on You".

For this video, he chose to add a few visual gimmicks in the form of shooting through transparent photos of flowers and small pieces of mirror. The writings on the walls which can be seen throughout the video were added later after Jacobs went around town filming graffiti and poetry. The words "I Never Loved You Anyway" however could not be found anywhere and had to be written on a wall.

Jacobs noted some interesting challenges during the shooting of video with seagulls flying in and out of the building for shelter due to the heavy rain on the day of the shoot. Sharon Corr once said that in some shots, birds can be seen landing in the galleries.

== Track listings ==
- UK, Australian, and Japanese CD single
1. "I Never Loved You Anyway" (edit) – 3:53
2. "What I Know" – 3:48
3. "I Never Loved You Anyway" (acoustic) – 3:53
- UK cassette single and European CD single
1. "I Never Loved You Anyway" (edit) – 3:53
2. "What I Know" – 3:48

== Credits and personnel ==
Credits are lifted from the UK CD single liner notes and the Talk on Corners album booklet.

Studios

- Recorded at Chartmaker Studios (Malibu, California)
- Additional recording at the Record Plant (Los Angeles)
- Mixed at Mix This! Studio (Pacific Palisades, Los Angeles)
- Mastered at Gateway Mastering (Portland, Maine, US)

Personnel

- The Corrs – writing, arrangement
  - Andrea Corr – lyrics, tin whistle
  - Caroline Corr – bodhrán
  - Jim Corr – guitars, keyboards
  - Sharon Corr – violin
- Carole Bayer Sager – writing, lyrics
- Tim Pierce – guitars
- John Robinson – drums
- David Foster – production, arrangement
- Felipe Elgueta – recording, synth programming
- David Reitzas – additional recording
- Leo Pearson – synth programming
- Bob Clearmountain – mixing
- Ryan Freeland – mixing assistance
- Bob Ludwig – mastering

== Charts ==
Chart (1997–1998)	Peak position
Australia (ARIA)	31
Canada Adult Contemporary (RPM)	49
Scottish Singles Sales (Official Charts)	37
Spain (AFYVE)	15
UK Singles (Official Charts)	43
UK Airplay (Music Control)	55

== Release history ==
Region	Date	Format(s)	Label(s)	Ref.
Ireland	December 1997	—N/a	143; Atlantic; Lava	
United Kingdom	8 December 1997	CD; cassette	143; Atlantic; Lava	
Japan	25 January 1998	CD	143; Atlantic; Lava	
United States	14 July 1998	Contemporary hit radio	143; Atlantic; Lava	
