= Home (The Corrs album) =

Studio album by the Corrs
- Released: 26 September 2005
- Recorded: 2005
- Genre: Celtic
- Length: 45:32
- Label: Atlantic
- Producer: Mitchell Froom

The Corrs chronology
Borrowed Heaven (2004)	Home (2005)	Dreams: The Ultimate Corrs Collection (2006)

Home is the fifth studio album by Irish band the Corrs. An Irish-themed album, it includes covers of old Irish songs and traditionals, but also covers of non-Irish songs such as "Heart Like a Wheel". It includes two tracks in Irish, "Buachaill Ón Éirne" and "Bríd Óg Ní Mháille"; and three instrumentals, "Old Hag (You Killed Me)", "Haste to the Wedding", and the bonus track "Return to Fingall". Home was compiled from a songbook of their deceased mother Jean Corr. The album was released exactly 10 years after the release of their first album Forgiven, Not Forgotten.

Although the Corrs returned to their Irish roots, the commercial success of this album and its singles has been poor. "Old Town" performed poorly on the UK Singles Chart, peaking at number 43.

== Critical reception ==
Professional ratings
Review scores
Source	Rating
AllMusic	4.5/5 stars
PopMatters	8/10 discs
Virgin.net	2/5 stars

Mark Weisinger from PopMatters stated that "anyone who has been waiting since the original, unremixed version of Talk On Corners for the Corrs to abandon their pursuit of the American pop charts to deliver another record along the lines of Forgiven, Not Forgotten will finally find their waiting repaid handsomely." The decision to cover and release "Old Town" as a single was questioned, with Gareth Maher of CLUAS.com calling it "a disastrous one".

== Track listing ==
All songs are traditional, arranged by the Corrs, except where noted.

No.	Title	Length
1.	"My Lagan Love" (Irish traditional)	4:20
2.	"Spancill Hill" (includes the instrumental "Rakes of Kildare" from 3:37)	5:08
3.	"Peggy Gordon"	4:26
4.	"Black Is the Colour"	3:49
5.	"Heart Like a Wheel" (Anna McGarrigle)	3:53
6.	"Buachaill ón Éirne" ("Boy from Erne" in Irish)	3:14
7.	"Old Hag" (instrumental; Sharon Corr)	3:43
8.	"Moorlough Shore"	4:17
9.	"Old Town" (Philip Lynott, Jimmy Bain)	3:44
10.	"Dimming of the Day" (Richard Thompson)	2:56
11.	"Bríd Óg Ní Mháille" ("Bridget O'Malley" in Irish)	3:36
12.	"Haste to the Wedding" (instrumental)	2:26
Total length:		45:32

Japanese, German, Spanish and digital release bonus track
No.	Title	Length
13.	"Return to Fingall" (instrumental)	4:14
Total length:		49:46

== Charts and certifications ==
=== Weekly charts ===
Chart (2005)	Peak position
Australian Albums (ARIA)	44
Austrian Albums (Ö3 Austria)	13
Belgian Albums (Ultratop Flanders)	14
Belgian Albums (Ultratop Wallonia)	6
Dutch Albums (Album Top 100)	15
European Albums (Billboard)	8
French Albums (SNEP)	5
German Albums (Offizielle Top 100)	12
Hungarian Albums (MAHASZ)	21
Irish Albums (IRMA)	1
Italian Albums (FIMI)	37
Japanese Albums (Oricon)	59
New Zealand Albums (RMNZ)	37
Portuguese Albums (AFP)	26
Scottish Albums (OCC)	12
Spanish Albums (PROMUSICAE)	8
Swedish Albums (Sverigetopplistan)	44
Swiss Albums (Schweizer Hitparade)	7
UK Albums (OCC)	14

=== Year-end charts ===
Chart (2005)	Peak position
Belgian Albums (Ultratop Wallonia)	34
French Albums (SNEP)	19
Swiss Albums (Hitparade)	83

=== Certifications ===
Region	Certification	Certified units/sales
France (SNEP)	Platinum	200,000^{*}
Ireland (IRMA)	2× Platinum	30,000^{^}
United Kingdom (BPI)	Silver	60,000^{^}
^{*} Sales figures based on certification alone.^{^} Shipments figures based on certification alone.
