= Goodbye (The Corrs song) =

2006 single by the Corrs

Single by The Corrs

from the album Borrowed Heaven and Dreams: The Ultimate Corrs Collection
- B-side: "Pebble in the Brook"
- Released: 20 November 2006 (UK)
- Recorded: 2004
- Genre: Pop
- Length: 3:45
- Label: Warner
- Songwriter: The Corrs
- Producers: Olle Romo; Brian Rawling (remix)

The Corrs singles chronology
"Heart Like a Wheel/Old Town" (2005)	"Goodbye" (2006)	"Bring on the Night" (2015)

"Goodbye" is a single by The Corrs, released in 2006 as the lead single from their compilation album Dreams: The Ultimate Corrs Collection. It is a remixed version of a song that originally appeared on their 2004 album Borrowed Heaven. The song was only released as a digital single, which caused frustration with fans who were willing but not able to purchase it. The bonus tracks include a demo version of "Goodbye" sung by Sharon and a new instrumental called "Pebble in the Brook".

== Track listing ==
1. "Goodbye" (2006 remix) – 3:45
2. "Goodbye" (album version) – 4:08
3. "Goodbye" (demo version) – 3:38
4. "Pebble in the Brook" – 3:06

== Music video ==
The Corrs in the music video for "Goodbye"

The video for the single, similar to the "Love To Love You" and "Runaway" remix videos, features live footage, this time from the concert in Geneva, Switzerland (from the Borrowed Heaven Tour (2004)), interspersed with various clips from previous concerts (Lansdowne Road, Ischgl, London, etc.), recording sessions and behind-the-scenes snippets from the documentaries All The Way Home and The Right Time.
