= What Can I Do (The Corrs song) =

1998 single by the Corrs

- Artwork for the Tin Tin Out remix

Single by the Corrs

from the album Talk on Corners
- B-side: "Little Wing"; "No Good for Me"
- Released: January 1998
- Genre: Folk-pop
- Length: 4:18 (album version); 4:12 (remix)
- Label: 143; Atlantic; Lava
- Songwriter: The Corrs
- Producers: Jim Corr; Tin Tin Out (remix)

The Corrs singles chronology
"I Never Loved You Anyway" (1997)	"What Can I Do" (1998)	"Dreams" (1998)
"Dreams" (1998)	"What Can I Do" (Tin Tin Out remix) (1998)	"So Young" (1998)

Alternative cover
- US CD artwork

Audio
- "What Can I Do" (original) on YouTube

Music video
- "What Can I Do" (Tin Tin Out remix) on YouTube

"What Can I Do" is a song by Irish band the Corrs, from their second and breakthrough album, Talk on Corners (1997). The song was originally released in January 1998, but its moderate charting success was limited, due to the time of the shooting of the video. The song was later re-released in August the same year in remixed form by Tin Tin Out, which generated more attention, reaching number three in the United Kingdom. The song received generally favorable reviews from music critics, though some felt it was not as strong as their previous songs. An accompanying music video was released, which was shot in New Zealand during their world tour.

== Background ==
The original version of the song, which appeared on the original release of Talk on Corners, is a slow doo-wop style song, which is much lighter. However, the Tin Tin Out remix, which later appeared on the album's special edition release, is more guitar riffed with the addition of orchestral strings in the latter half of the song performed by the Duke Quartet. The voice range is a chord of A major and spans from G♯3 to C♯5. The Corrs have regularly performed this song live in concert since the start of the Talk on Corners World Tour in November 1997, originally performing the album version, but later switching to the Tin Tin Out version permanently from September 1998 onwards.

== Critical reception ==
"What Can I Do" received generally favourable reviews from music critics, although the group did not initially favour the track. Becky Byrkit from AllMusic praised the remix version, noting its "trademark glass voices and barely discernible acoustic musical instruments." She also highlighted the song as an album standout. Dave Karger from Entertainment Weekly viewed it a "sluggishly sweet tune", saying that the guitar riff is "a bit too reminiscent" of Edie Brickell's "What I Am" (which Tin Tin Out covered the following year) and the lyrics "shamelessly swiped" from Elton John's "Sorry Seems to Be the Hardest Word".

A reviewer from Music Week felt the remix "lacks the warmth of the original, but Andrea Corr's vocals shine through the rather spartan sound and the chorus's hook remains as infectious as ever." Claudia Connell from News of the World remarked that "Corrs are one of the most played acts on Irish airwaves at the moment and this looks like being the hit single they desperately deserve. "What Can I Do" is more radio-friendly than anything else around and has to rocket the family band into the big league." Dave Fawbert from ShortList praised it as a "absolutely brilliant song" and "really lovely slice of folky pop". Ian Hyland from Sunday Mirror gave it nine out of ten, writing, "Familiar guitar riffs and beautiful Irish lilts should see this fly into the top ten."

== Chart performance ==
Upon its release in January 1998, the original version of "What Can I Do" debuted at number 44 on the Swedish Singles Chart, later rising to number 27, its peak. The song was then re-released a few months later, remixed by Tin Tin Out. The remix was even more successful than "Dreams" and entered the top three of the UK Singles Chart, peaking at number three. It remained on the charts for 13 weeks.

== Music video ==
The video for "What Can I Do" was shot on 27 February 1998, in Manukau Heads at the Kohekohe Church and the surrounding areas, during the band's New Zealand leg of their Talk on Corners World Tour. The video was directed by Nigel Dick and shot by Russell Swanson. According to Andy Murray, head of marketing at Warner Bros. Records, due to the popularity of the song in Germany, Atlantic and Warner Bros. Records pushed for a video to be shot quickly to accompany the songs success. Nigel was flown in from New York and spent a day scouting for locations around Auckland and shot the video the next.

== Track listings ==
=== Original release ===
- UK CD single
1. "What Can I Do"
2. "Little Wing"
3. "No Good for Me" (live in Copenhagen, October 1997)
- UK cassette single and European CD single
1. "What Can I Do" – 4:18
2. "No Good for Me" (live in Copenhagen, October 1997) – 3:54

=== Remixes ===
- UK CD1
1. "What Can I Do" (Tin Tin Out remix) – 4:12
2. "What Can I Do" (Stringappella) – 2:28
3. "Paddy McCarthy" – 4:59
- UK CD2 (recorded live at the Albert Hall on 17 March 1998)
1. "What Can I Do" (live) – 4:29
2. "Runaway" (live) – 4:26
3. "Toss the Feathers" (live) – 3:53
- Australian CD single
1. "What Can I Do" (Tin Tin Out remix) – 4:12
2. "What Can I Do" (LP version) – 4:12
3. "Dreams" (Tees radio) – 3:53
- US CD, 7-inch, and cassette single
1. "What Can I Do" (Mangini remix) – 4:04
2. "What Can I Do" (original mix) – 4:21

== Charts ==
Chart (1998–1999)	Peak position
Australia (ARIA) Tin Tin Out remix	86
Canada Adult Contemporary (RPM)	23
Europe (Eurochart Hot 100)	12
Germany (GfK)	62
Iceland (Íslenski Listinn Topp 40)	17
Ireland (IRMA)	30
Scottish Singles Sales (Official Charts)	48
Scottish Singles Sales (Official Charts) Tin Tin Out remix	3
Spain (AFYVE) Tin Tin Out remix	1
Sweden (Sverigetopplistan)	27
UK Singles (Official Charts)	53
UK Airplay (Music Control)	69
UK Singles (Official Charts) Tin Tin Out remix	3
UK Airplay (Music Week) Tin Tin Out remix	1

== Certifications ==
Region	Certification	Certified units/sales
United Kingdom (BPI)	Gold	400,000^{‡}
^{‡} Sales+streaming figures based on certification alone.

== Release history ==
Region	Version	Date	Format(s)	Label(s)	Ref.
Ireland	Original	January 1998	—N/a	143; Atlantic; Lava	
United Kingdom	Original	16 March 1998	CD; cassette	143; Atlantic; Lava	
United Kingdom	Tin Tin Out remix	17 August 1998	CD; cassette	143; Atlantic; Lava	
United States	Mangini remix	9 February 1999	Contemporary hit radio	143; Atlantic; Lava	
