= Love to Love You (The Corrs song) =

1996 single by the Corrs

Single by the Corrs

from the album Forgiven, Not Forgotten
- B-side: "Rainy Day"; "Carraroe Jig"
- Released: September 1996
- Length: 3:23
- Label: 143; Atlantic; Lava
- Songwriter: The Corrs
- Producers: David Foster; Jim Corr

The Corrs singles chronology
"The Right Time" (1996)	"Love to Love You" (1996)	"Closer" (1997)

"Love to Love You" is a song by Celtic folk rock band the Corrs, the fourth single from their debut album Forgiven, Not Forgotten. It was released in September 1996, peaking at number 62 on the UK Singles Chart and reaching the top 50 in Australia and New Zealand. In the UK, it was issued as a double A-side with a re-release of "Runaway".

== Music video ==
The video for the fourth single is a compilation of some concert footage filmed at live gigs and some behind the scenes footage at photo shoots in and around Dublin in July 1996, interspersed with short clips of the Corrs on board an aircraft carrier. There was not enough time to make a more complicated video.

Most of the scenes in the video can also be found in the documentary "The Right Time", which was directed by Ciaran Tanham. The scenes on the American aircraft carrier called John F. Kennedy, which was then located in Dublin Bay are also featured in the aforementioned documentary.

== Track listings ==
UK and European CD single; Australian CD and cassette single

1. "Love to Love You" (radio edit) – 3:21
2. "Rainy Day" – 4:02
3. "Carraroe Jig" (full length version) – 3:56

UK cassette single

1. "Love to Love You" (radio edit) – 3:21
2. "Rainy Day" – 4:02

== Charts ==
Chart (1996–1997)	Peak position
Australia (ARIA)	25
Germany (GfK)	87
Netherlands (Single Top 100 Tipparade)	18
New Zealand (Recorded Music NZ)	46
Scotland Singles (OCC) with "Runaway"	64
Spain (AFYVE)	40
UK Singles (OCC) with "Runaway"	62

== Release history ==
Region	Date	Format(s)	Label(s)	Ref.
Ireland	September 1996	—N/a	143; Atlantic; Lava	
United Kingdom	20 January 1997	CD; cassette	143; Atlantic; Lava	
