= Only When I Sleep =

1997 single by the Corrs

Single by the Corrs

from the album Talk on Corners
- Released: September 1997
- Length: 3:50
- Label: 143; Atlantic; Lava
- Songwriters: The Corrs; John Shanks; Oliver Leiber; Paul Peterson
- Producer: Oliver Leiber

The Corrs singles chronology
"Closer" (1997)	"Only When I Sleep" (1997)	"I Never Loved You Anyway" (1997)

"Only When I Sleep" is a song by Irish folk rock band the Corrs, released in September 1997 as the lead single from their second album, Talk on Corners (1997). The track was also included on the second issuing of the album, Talk on Corners: Special Edition (1998), and was also recorded live with an orchestra for MTV's Unplugged (1999). It is also featured on Dreams: The Ultimate Corrs Collection (2006). "Only When I Sleep" peaked at number 10 on the Irish Singles Chart, number 34 on the Australian Singles Chart, and number 58 on the UK Singles Chart.

== Critical reception ==
Alan Jones from Music Week described the song as "a classy and sonically pleasing ballad performed in a style midway between Roxette and Heart. The family's pleasing harmonies are a plus, as is the vaguely Irish fiddling. An invaluable trigger to sales of their upcoming album Talk On Corners."

== Music video ==
The accompanying music video for "Only When I Sleep" was shot at the Alexandria Hotel in Los Angeles, and is of a more glamorous style than the previous videos. The hotel used to be very popular in the early days of Hollywood, and famous stars like Charlie Chaplin, Sarah Bernhardt, Rudolph Valentino, Douglas Fairbanks or Cecil B. DeMille but also politicians like Theodore Roosevelt and Winston Churchill stayed at the hotel. It is abandoned today but still used as a filming location of many films, TV shows (e.g. The X-Files) and other music videos.

== Track listings ==
- UK and Japanese CD single
1. "Only When I Sleep" (radio edit) – 3:50
2. "Only When I Sleep" (LP version) – 4:23
3. "Remember" – 4:02
4. "Only When I Sleep" (instrumental) – 4:23
- UK cassette single
1. "Only When I Sleep" (radio edit) – 3:50
2. "Remember" – 4:02
- French and Benelux CD single
1. "Only When I Sleep" (radio edit) – 3:50
2. "Only When I Sleep" (LP version) – 4:23
3. "Only When I Sleep" (instrumental) – 4:23

== Personnel ==
Personnel are taken from the UK CD single liner notes.

The Corrs

- Andrea Corr – lead vocals, tin whistle
- Caroline Corr – vocals, drums, bodhrán
- Sharon Corr – vocals, violin
- Jim Corr – vocals, guitar, keyboards
- The Corrs – writing, co-production

Production

- John Shanks – writing
- Paul Peterson – writing
- Oliver Leiber – writing, production
- Bob Clearmountain – mixing
- Brenda Rotheiser – art direction
- Blinkk – photography

== Charts ==
Chart (1997–1998)	Peak position
Australia (ARIA)	34
Ireland (IRMA)	10
Scottish Singles Sales (Official Charts)	47
Spain (AFYVE)	1
UK Singles (Official Charts)	58

== Release history ==
Region	Date	Format(s)	Label(s)	Ref.
Ireland	September 1997	—N/a	143; Atlantic; Lava	
United Kingdom	13 October 1997	CD; cassette	143; Atlantic; Lava	
Japan	29 October 1997	CD	143; Atlantic; Lava	
