= Heart Like a Wheel/Old Town =

2005 single by the Corrs

Single by The Corrs

from the album Home
- Released: 24 October 2005
- Recorded: May 2005
- Length: 3:16 (Old Town)
- Label: Atlantic

The Corrs singles chronology
"Long Night" (2004)	"Heart Like a Wheel" / "Old Town" (2005)	"Goodbye" (2006)

"Heart Like a Wheel"/"Old Town" was a double A-sided single from The Corrs' fifth studio album, Home, released in late 2005. "Heart Like a Wheel" is a cover of the Kate & Anna McGarrigle song, and "Old Town" is a cover version of the Phil Lynott song. It is their lowest charting UK single to date (excluding non-charting singles), although in Spain "Old Town" reached the top 10. "Heart Like a Wheel" entered the British single charts at No. 68.

== Track listing ==
1. "Heart Like a Wheel"
2. "Old Town"

== Charts ==
Chart	Peak position
Irish Singles Chart	49
Netherlands Mega Single Top 100	63
Spain (PROMUSICAE)	10
UK Singles Chart	68
