= So Young (The Corrs song) =

1998 single by the Corrs

Single by the Corrs

from the album Talk on Corners
- B-side: "Forgiven, Not Forgotten"; "Haste to the Wedding"
- Released: November 1998
- Studio: Ollywood (Hollywood, California)
- Length: 4:12
- Label: 143; Atlantic; Lava
- Composer: The Corrs
- Lyricist: Sharon Corr
- Producers: Jim Corr; Oliver Leiber; K-Klass (remix)

The Corrs singles chronology
"What Can I Do" (Tin Tin Out remix) (1998)	"So Young" (1998)	"Runaway" (Tin Tin Out remix) (1999)

Music video
- "So Young" on YouTube

"So Young" is a song by the Irish folk rock band the Corrs from their second studio album, Talk on Corners (1997). Written about the band members' parents, the song was released as the album's fifth (sixth if counting the Tin Tin Out remix of "What Can I Do") single in November 1998. For its single release, British electronic music group K-Klass remixed "So Young"; this version charted in several countries, reaching the top 40 in Ireland, Iceland, and the United Kingdom. The accompanying music video was shot in the United States, depicting the band atop a 53 floors high building, throwing paper planes in the air.

== Release ==
"So Young" was written by Sharon Corr and is a song about her parents, Jean and Gerry Corr, who she believed were "forever young". The 1998 single version is a remix by British group K-Klass, and this remix was later included on the re-released Talk on Corners: Special Edition album (1998). The song peaked at number 29 on the Irish Singles Chart and number six in the United Kingdom. Initially, the band had to convince their label to include the song on the album, a decision vindicated by its popularity.

The K-Klass remix contains an extra few bars on the first verse, which was deleted from the album version for unexplained reasons (on the original version, both the first and second verses were composed as one, long verse). Since May 1998, the band have performed the song with the extra bars included.

== Critical reception ==
The song received positive reviews from music critics. Larry Flick from Billboard magazine wrote, "This K-Klass remix of 'So Young' has been funked up just enough to better parallel U.S. programming trends and is as bright and inviting as anything we're hearing in power rotation these days. The Corrs are completely in control of the variables at hand, with a beautiful, uptempo melody line, crisp harmonies, right-on production, and, yes, a chorus that might just stick in the hearts of listeners given the chance to at last get to know this phenomenal Irish family quartet. Let's do it!" James Hunter from Rolling Stone described it as "vibrantly".

== Music video ==
The music video for "So Young" was shot in Chicago, the US, as the Corrs were on tour in the US at that time (21 October 1998). Much shooting took place in and around the Flamingo Building. The structure that gives the building its name is 53 floors high and was designed by Alexander Calder in 1974. The Corrs are standing on the top of the Flamingo Building throwing paper planes into the windy air.

== Track listings ==
- UK CD1 and Australian CD single
1. "So Young" (K-Klass remix) – 4:12
2. "Forgiven, Not Forgotten" – 4:15
3. "Haste to the Wedding" (acoustic) – 3:00
- UK CD2
1. "So Young" (live) – 4:27
2. "When He's Not Around" (live) – 5:13
3. "Joy of Life (Carraroe Jig)" (live) – 4:44
- All tracks were recorded live at the Royal Albert Hall, London, on 17 March 1998
- UK cassette single
1. "So Young" (K-Klass remix) – 4:12
2. "Forgiven, Not Forgotten" – 4:15
- European CD single
1. "So Young" (K-Klass remix) – 4:14
2. "Haste to the Wedding" (acoustic) – 3:00

== Credits and personnel ==
Credits are lifted from the UK CD1 liner notes.

Studios

- Recorded at Ollywood Studios (Hollywood, California, US)
- Engineered at The Bunker (Wrexham, Wales)

Personnel

- The Corrs – writing
  - Sharon Corr – lyrics
  - Jim Corr – production
- Anto Drennan – guitars
- Gota Yashiki, Groove Activator – drums
- Paul "Biggy" Birchall – additional keyboards
- Oliver Leiber – production, recording
- K-Klass – remix, additional production
- Barry Rudolph – recording
- Leo Pearson – programming
- James Reynolds – mix engineering

== Charts ==
Chart (1998–1999)	Peak position
Australia (ARIA)	61
Europe (Eurochart Hot 100)	36
France (SNEP)	76
Germany (GfK)	80
Iceland (Íslenski Listinn Topp 40)	33
Ireland (IRMA)	29
Netherlands (Dutch Top 40 Tipparade)	11
Netherlands (Single Top 100)	63
Scottish Singles Sales (Official Charts)	6
Spain (AFYVE)	1
UK Singles (Official Charts)	6
UK Airplay (Music Week)	1

== Release history ==
Region	Date	Format(s)	Label(s)	Ref.
Ireland	November 1998	—N/a	143; Atlantic; Lava	
United Kingdom	16 November 1998	CD; cassette	143; Atlantic; Lava	
United States	27 April 1999	Contemporary hit radio	143; Atlantic; Lava	
