= Runaway (The Corrs song) =

1995 single by the Corrs

- Artwork for Irish and French CD editions

Single by the Corrs

from the album Forgiven, Not Forgotten
- B-side: "Leave Me Alone"
- Released: September 1995
- Length: 4:24 (album version); 3:47 (radio edit)
- Label: 143; Atlantic; Lava
- Songwriter: The Corrs
- Producers: David Foster; Jim Corr

The Corrs singles chronology
"Runaway" (1995)	"Forgiven, Not Forgotten" (1996)

Music video
- "Runaway" on YouTube

"Runaway" is a song by Irish family band the Corrs, released in September 1995 by 143, Atlantic, and Lava Records as the lead single from their first album, Forgiven, Not Forgotten (1995). It had middling chart success except in Ireland and Australia, peaking at number 10 in both countries. It was also an adult contemporary hit in Canada, reaching number two on the RPM Adult Contemporary Tracks chart. On the UK Singles Chart, it originally reached number 49, but a re-release in 1999 saw the single reach a new peak of number two on the same chart. The accompanying music video was directed by Randee St. Nicholas and filmed in Ireland.

== Background and composition ==
The song was written by Andrea, Sharon and Caroline Corr, and co-produced by their older brother Jim, with David Foster. Andrea has said the first time she sang it in front of her parents, she was embarrassed because of the line "make love to me through the night" and noted that she knew her mother would be thinking "where did she learn that?!"

The song has a subtle key change. It is written in F major, but towards the end, the fourth (a B flat) gets augmented (becoming a B), so the key changes to lydian mode. Rhythmically, a similar change happens in the drums, which initially play a slow 6/8th. In the end, a snare drum is played on the 2-eh and 5-eh, which makes a double-time feel.

== Reception ==
Steve Baltin from Cash Box stated that the song "should immediately make a mark" at Adult Contemporary, because of its producer, David Foster. He added that the Corrs "has a very soothing quality running through this string-based mid-tempo tune. With all the pluses working for it, the Corrs should strike quickly into the American pop scene"; by 2001, however, the band noted their lack of mainstream success in the American market. A reviewer from Music Week rated it four out of five, describing it as an "excellent single", with "touches of Fairground Attraction". Pan-European magazine Music & Media wrote, "Programmers who like their playlist material to be full of melody and harmony should stop here. The Corrs are four siblings from County Louth, Ireland, who specialise in blending stately and melodic pop with more traditional Celtic music, resulting in a record perfect for daytime ERR and ACE."

During the Corrs' 2001 concert at the Araneta Coliseum in the Philippines, both "Runaway" and "All the Love in the World" received ecstatic responses from the opening night audience compared to the band's earlier lineup of songs, with journalist Hugo "Zach" Yonzon IV recounting: "Andrea tries her charming best to woo the crowds, but only manages to create a wave in the direction she faces. [...] And then they go into "Runaway" and all hell breaks loose. The audience cheer so hard it’s defeaning. The crowd, the appreciative but otherwise lethargic crowd stand up[....] Soon the entire hall is filled with a multitude of small lights like a miniature sky. Ingenious fans, lacking glow sticks and lighters, use the light from their mobile phones. This is when hairs stand on end. Only in the Philippines."

== Music video ==
The music video for "Runaway", directed by Randee St. Nicholas, was shot in Dublin over two days in August 1995, featuring locations such as Phoenix Park and Pearse Railway Station. Shot mostly in black-and-white, with flashes of colour in certain scenes, the video begins with Andrea on a train, looking out the window and singing, then follows the band as they sing and perform in several locations, including in a forest and on a train station platform, before ending with her getting off the train and running towards the camera.

Sharon once said this video should give fans an impression of what Ireland is like. Accordingly, it was raining the day the scenes where Andrea is running through the woods were shot.

== Track listings ==
UK and European CD single
No.	Title	Length
1.	"Runaway" (radio edit)	3:47
2.	"Runaway" (LP version)	4:25
3.	"Leave Me Alone" (LP version)	3:39

UK cassette single
No.	Title	Length
1.	"Runaway" (radio edit)	3:47
2.	"Leave Me Alone" (LP version)	3:39

US CD and cassette single
No.	Title	Length
1.	"Runaway"	4:25
2.	"Leave Me Alone"	3:39
3.	"Special previews from Forgiven, Not Forgotten"	2:18

Australian CD and cassette single
No.	Title	Length
1.	"Runaway" (radio mix)	3:47
2.	"Leave Me Alone"	3:39
3.	"Special previews from Forgiven, Not Forgotten"	2:18

== Charts ==
=== Weekly charts ===
Chart (1995–1996)	Peak position
Australia (ARIA)	10
Canada Top Singles (RPM)	25
Canada Adult Contemporary (RPM)	2
Germany (GfK)	89
Ireland (IRMA)	10
New Zealand (Recorded Music NZ)	48
Scottish Singles Sales (Official Charts)	54
Spain (AFYVE)	30
UK Singles (Official Charts)	49
UK Airplay (Music Week)	35
US Billboard Hot 100	68
US Adult Contemporary (Billboard)	20
US Cash Box Top 100	62

=== Year-end charts ===
Chart (1996)	Position
Australia (ARIA)	27
Canada Adult Contemporary (RPM)	51

== Certifications ==
Region	Certification	Certified units/sales
Australia (ARIA)	Platinum	70,000^{‡}
New Zealand (RMNZ)	Gold	15,000^{‡}
^{‡} Sales+streaming figures based on certification alone.

== Release history ==
Region	Date	Format(s)	Label(s)	Ref.
Ireland	September 1995	—N/a	143; Atlantic; Lava	
United States	12 September 1995	Contemporary hit radio	143; Atlantic; Lava	
United Kingdom	22 January 1996	CD; cassette	143; Atlantic; Lava	

== Remix version ==
"Runaway"

Single by the Corrs

from the album Talk on Corners: Special Edition
- B-side: "What Can I Do"
- Released: 15 February 1999
- Length: 4:03
- Label: 143; Atlantic; Lava
- Songwriter: The Corrs
- Producers: David Foster; Jim Corr; Tin Tin Out

The Corrs singles chronology
"So Young" (1998)	"Runaway" (1999)	"I Know My Love" (1999)

The song was re-released in February 1999, remixed by Tin Tin Out, reaching number two on the UK Singles Chart. Atypical of Tin Tin Out's usual output and their previous remix of the Corrs' song "What Can I Do", the remix for "Runaway" is a lighter, more folk-oriented recording which utilizes a stripped back live band arrangement with a simple drum kit, a rhythmic bass guitar and a strummed acoustic guitar, retains Sharon Corr's fiddle from the original recording, features orchestral strings in the latter half of the song performed by the Duke Quartet and removes the rhythm change present in the original version.

=== Track listing ===
UK CD and cassette single
No.	Title	Length
1.	"Runaway" (Tin Tin Out remix edit)	4:03
2.	"Runaway" (album version)	4:25
3.	"What Can I Do" (Mangini mix)	4:02

=== Music video ===
Dani Jacob's fourth Corrs video is, similar to "Love to Love You", compiled of backstage and concert footage; this time from one single gig at the Manchester Evening News Arena on 1 February 1999. Footage of the band walking through the corridor to the stage was later used for the intro for the rest of their concerts from 1999 to 2001.

=== Charts ===
==== Weekly charts ====
Chart (1999)	Peak position
Europe (Eurochart Hot 100)	11
Scottish Singles Sales (Official Charts)	3
UK Singles (Official Charts)	2
UK Airplay (Music Week)	2

==== Year-end charts ====
Chart (1999)	Position
UK Singles (OCC)	67
UK Airplay (Music Week)	19

=== Certifications ===
Region	Certification	Certified units/sales
United Kingdom (BPI)	Platinum	600,000^{‡}
^{‡} Sales+streaming figures based on certification alone.
