= Duke Quartet =

The Duke Quartet is a contemporary string quartet based in Europe. Its members are Louisa Fuller (violin), Rick Koster (violin), John Metcalfe (viola), and Sophie Harris (cello).

This quartet specialises in contemporary classical music, and its repertoire is similar to that of the Kronos Quartet. The Duke Quartet has a strong relationship with some modern composers such as Kevin Volans and Joby Talbot. They are also widely known in the popular music field, and appeared on Morrissey's Viva Hate album, and have also worked with The Pretenders, Blur, Catatonia, Simple Minds, The Corrs, The Cranberries, and Pete Doherty. They played with The Bootleg Beatles during 1993 and 1994

== Events ==
Radio 3 broadcast on 12 July, 10.45pm: Music by Volans, Arvo Pärt, George Crumb, Steve Reich and Joby Talbot.
