= Dreams (Fleetwood Mac song) =

1977 single by Fleetwood Mac

- German vinyl single

Single by Fleetwood Mac

from the album Rumours
- B-side: "Songbird"
- Released: 24 March 1977
- Recorded: 1976
- Studio: Record Plant (Sausalito); Wally Heider's Studio 3 (Hollywood)
- Genre: Soft rock
- Length: 4:14
- Label: Warner Bros.
- Songwriter: Stevie Nicks
- Producers: Fleetwood Mac; Ken Caillat; Richard Dashut

Fleetwood Mac American singles chronology
"Go Your Own Way" (1977)	"Dreams" (1977)	"Don't Stop" (1977)

Fleetwood Mac British singles chronology
"Don't Stop" (1977)	"Dreams" (1977)	"You Make Loving Fun" (1977)

Audio sample
- file; help

Official audio
- "Dreams" (2004 Remaster) on YouTube

"Dreams" is a song by the British-American rock band Fleetwood Mac, written and sung by Stevie Nicks for the band's eleventh studio album, Rumours (1977). In the United States, "Dreams" was released as the second single from Rumours in March 1977, by Warner Bros., while in the United Kingdom, the song was released as the third single in June 1977. A stage performance of "Dreams" was used as the promotional music video.

In the US, "Dreams" sold more than one million copies and reached the top spot on the Billboard Hot 100, the band's only number-one single in the country. In Canada, "Dreams" also reached number one on the RPM Top 100 Singles chart.

In late 2020, the song experienced a widespread resurgence in popularity as a result of a viral TikTok video created by Nathan Apodaca, which featured the song while he was riding his skateboard to work while drinking Ocean Spray cran-raspberry juice. The song subsequently re-entered national music charts and also entered the Spotify and Apple Music charts in certain countries. "Dreams" was ranked number nine on Rolling Stone's 2021 list of the "500 Greatest Songs of All Time".

== Background and composition ==
The members of Fleetwood Mac were experiencing emotional upheavals while recording the Rumours album. Mick Fleetwood was going through a divorce, Christine McVie and John McVie were separating, while Lindsey Buckingham and Stevie Nicks were ending their eight-year relationship. "We had to go through this elaborate exercise of denial," explained Buckingham to Blender magazine, "keeping our personal feelings in one corner of the room while trying to be professional in the other."

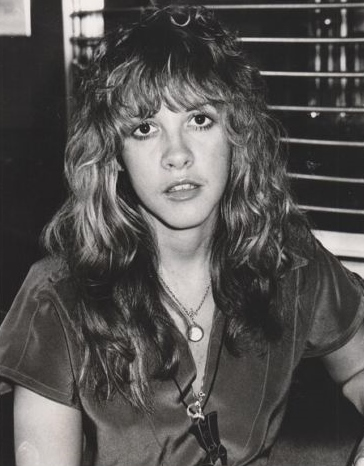
Stevie Nicks in 1977

Stevie Nicks wrote the song in early 1976 at Record Plant studio in Sausalito, California. "One day when I wasn't required in the main studio," Nicks told Blender magazine. "I took a Fender Rhodes piano and went into another studio that was said to belong to Sly Stone, of Sly and the Family Stone. It was a black-and-red room, with a sunken pit in the middle where there was a piano, and a big black-velvet bed with Victorian drapes."

"I sat down on the bed with my keyboard in front of me," continues Nicks. "I found a drum pattern, switched my little cassette player on and wrote 'Dreams' in about 10 minutes. Right away I liked the fact that I was doing something with a dance beat, because that made it a little unusual for me."

Nicks recalled that the band was initially unsure about the merits of "Dreams" when they first heard the track. At the insistence of Nicks, the band recorded a demo of "Dreams" the following day. A basic track was recorded at Sausalito, with Nicks playing the Rhodes piano and singing. Cris Morris, who served as a recording assistant for Rumours, remembered that they retained the drum track and Stevie's live vocals from these initial sessions; the guitars and bass were recorded later in Los Angeles. Christine McVie described the song as having "just three chords and one note in the left hand" and "boring" when Nicks played a rough version on the piano. McVie changed her mind after Buckingham "fashioned three sections out of identical chords, making each section sound completely different. He created the impression that there's a thread running through the whole thing."

== Recording ==
Producer Ken Caillat made an eight bar drum loop of Fleetwood's drumming to create "deep hypnotic effect". Caillat said of the loop that "It's funny, but when people talk about the classic rhythm section of Mick Fleetwood and John McVie and they point to this one song, I'm always amused that they're talking about a drum loop." The electric guitars were sent through four different signals: "a direct signal, a miked signal, a signal running from the output of the amp head, and another direct signal from a volume pedal". These signals were then panned in stereo, which in producer Richard Dashut's estimation, allowed for the guitars to move across the left and right channels "in a very majestic way".

When deciding on the proper equipment for the lead vocals, Caillat assembled a series of eight microphones and asked Nicks to sing into them to determine which one she preferred. Nicks ultimately selected a Sennheiser 441 microphone, which was a relatively inexpensive microphone according to Caillat. "When she got to [that] one particular mic and sang into it, she said, 'Oh my god, I love this mic! It sounds great!', and my job was done." Caillat placed a windscreen a half-inch away from the microphone and asked Nicks to sing against it so that the lower frequencies of her voice would be captured. A guide vocal sung by Nicks was used as the final take, albeit with punch-ins on a few lines, as they could not achieve a superior vocal or recapture the interplay with the drums. In total, Nicks recorded ten different lead vocal tracks.

Buckingham determined which harmonies to sing during the song's chorus by playing triads on a piano with Nicks and McVie situated around the instrument. Once they settled on their parts, Buckingham, Nicks, and McVie doubled their three-part harmonies to achieve a fuller sound. The band decided that the pre-chorus needed more instrumentation, so Fleetwood added some tom-tom accents starting at the song's 48 second mark. Christine McVie originally played sparse whole notes on a piano during this section, but this was deemed unsuitable, so Dashut suggested the addition of a vibraphone instead, which was also played by McVie. Delay was applied to each vibraphone hit so that each note would repeat. During the same session, Fleetwood wanted to overdub some congas, but the instrument was not readily available, so he waited until the next day to record them. The congas were placed in the back of the mix starting with the "thunder only happens when it's raining" lyric.

== Reception ==
Billboard characterised "Dreams" as a "midtempo ballad with its easily-apparent lyric examination of her breakup" with Buckingham. They also highlighted Nicks' "breathier" vocal delivery and thought that the song's "simple, precise bass-drums line underpins the uncluttered instrumental backing." Cash Box believed that "Dreams" was "subdued in comparison" to "Go Your Own Way" with its "softly droning bass [that] backs Stevie Nicks' alluring lead vocal." Record World said that the single appeared "certain to extend the group's hot streak" and concluded by saying that "Stevie Nicks' vocal makes these dreams a melodic reality." New York Times critic John Rockwell called the single a "classy record" and commented on the appeal provided by Nicks' "strange, nasal yet husky soprano" and Mick Fleetwood's "wonderfully crisp, exact drumming."

The Guardian and Paste ranked the song number one and number four, respectively, on their lists of the 30 greatest Fleetwood Mac songs. Alexis Petridis of The Guardian reflected that the song's "lasting power" could be attributed to the lyrics, the "drowsy delivery" from Nicks, and the "hazy" instrumentation.

== Chart performance and legacy ==
In the United States, "Dreams" reached the number-one spot on the Billboard Hot 100 chart on 18 June 1977, and held it for one week. On the Adult Contemporary chart, "Dreams" peaked at number 11, making it the band's highest-charting single on that chart during the 1970s. On the UK Singles Chart, "Dreams" went to number 24, staying in the top 40 for eight weeks during its initial run.

Since its initial release, "Dreams" has re-entered the charts on various occasions. It picked up two additional weeks on the UK charts in 2011 following the airing of the Glee "Rumours" episode. In 2018, "Dreams" returned to the Billboard Hot Rock Songs chart at number 14, re-popularized by a viral tweet. The song also returned to the New Zealand charts for one week in 2019 at number 40. The song then re-entered the New Zealand charts on 5 October 2020 at number 28 and spent 71 consecutive weeks in the top 40, whilst also reaching a new peak of number six. The same year, it also entered the Irish charts for the first time.

In October 2020, the song reached number one on the Billboard Rock Digital Song Sales chart as a result of a viral TikTok video of Nathan Apodaca lip syncing to the song while skateboarding down a highway in Idaho Falls, Idaho, drinking Ocean Spray cran-raspberry juice. Following the popularity of the video, "Dreams" also placed among the Top 50 most-streamed songs on Spotify and Apple Music in the US, the UK, Australia, and New Zealand, re-entering the ARIA in Australia (where it reached a new peak) and the UK Official Charts. "Dreams" also re-entered the Billboard Hot 100 at number 21 on 17 October 2020, giving the band its highest placement on the Hot 100 since 20 February 1988, when "Everywhere" charted at number 17. "Dreams" then rose to number 12 the following week.

== Personnel ==
- Stevie Nicks – lead vocals, backing vocals
- Christine McVie – Fender Rhodes electric piano, organ, vibraphone, backing vocals
- Lindsey Buckingham – electric and acoustic guitars, backing vocals
- Mick Fleetwood – drums, congas
- John McVie – bass guitar

== Charts ==
=== Weekly charts ===
1977 weekly chart performance for "Dreams"
Chart (1977)	Peak position
Australia (Kent Music Report)	19
Belgium (Ultratop 50 Flanders)	22
Belgium (Ultratop 50 Wallonia)	25
Canada Adult Contemporary (RPM)	4
Canada Top Singles (RPM)	1
Netherlands (Dutch Top 40)	8
Netherlands (Single Top 100)	8
New Zealand (Recorded Music NZ)	16
UK Singles (Official Charts Company)	24
US Billboard Hot 100	1
US Adult Contemporary (Billboard)	11
US Cash Box Top 100	1
US Record World Singles	1
West Germany (GfK)	33

2019 weekly chart performance for "Dreams"
Chart (2019)	Peak position
Ireland (IRMA)	88

2020 weekly chart performance for "Dreams"
Chart (2020)	Peak position
Australia (ARIA)	4
Austria (Ö3 Austria Top 40)	64
Billboard Global 200	10
Canada Hot 100 (Billboard)	9
France (SNEP)	93
Germany (GfK)	73
Ireland (IRMA)	23
Netherlands (Single Top 100)	64
New Zealand (Recorded Music NZ)	6
Portugal (AFP)	111
Scottish Singles Sales (Official Charts)	9
Sweden (Sverigetopplistan)	34
Switzerland (Schweizer Hitparade)	30
UK Singles (Official Charts)	35
US Billboard Hot 100	12
US Hot Rock & Alternative Songs (Billboard)	2
US Rolling Stone Top 100	3

2025–2026 weekly chart performance for "Dreams"
Chart (2025–2026)	Peak position
Greece International (IFPI)	58
Iceland (Tónlistinn)	32
UK Singles (Official Charts Company)	18

=== Year-end charts ===
1977 year-end charts for "Dreams"
Chart (1977)	Position
Canada Top Singles (RPM)	18
Netherlands (Single Top 100)	100
US Billboard Hot 100	39
US Cash Box Top 100	21

2020 year-end charts for "Dreams"
Chart (2020)	Position
New Zealand (Recorded Music NZ)	42
US Hot Rock & Alternative Songs (Billboard)	17

2021 year-end charts for "Dreams"
Chart (2021)	Position
Australia (ARIA)	22
Global 200 (Billboard)	64
Ireland (IRMA)	41
New Zealand (Recorded Music NZ)	12
UK Singles (OCC)	54
US Hot Rock & Alternative Songs (Billboard)	34

2022 year-end charts for "Dreams"
Chart (2022)	Position
Australia (ARIA)	35
Global 200 (Billboard)	101
New Zealand (Recorded Music NZ)	11
UK Singles (OCC)	74

2023 year-end charts for "Dreams"
Chart (2023)	Position
Australia (ARIA)	33
Global 200 (Billboard)	157
New Zealand (Recorded Music NZ)	10
UK Singles (OCC)	57

2024 year-end charts for "Dreams"
Chart (2024)	Position
Australia (ARIA)	36
Global 200 (Billboard)	95
Netherlands (Single Top 100)	99
UK Singles (OCC)	48

2025 year-end charts for "Dreams"
Chart (2025)	Position
Australia (ARIA)	44
Global 200 (Billboard)	62
Iceland (Tónlistinn)	39
Netherlands (Single Top 100)	55
Sweden (Sverigetopplistan)	94
UK Singles (OCC)	37

== Certifications ==
Region	Certification	Certified units/sales
Australia (ARIA)	15× Platinum	1,050,000^{‡}
Denmark (IFPI Danmark)	2× Platinum	180,000^{‡}
Italy (FIMI)	Platinum	100,000^{‡}
New Zealand (RMNZ)	20× Platinum	600,000^{‡}
Norway (IFPI Norway)	Gold	30,000^{‡}
Portugal (AFP)	2× Platinum	50,000^{‡}
Spain (Promusicae)	Platinum	60,000^{‡}
United Kingdom (BPI)	7× Platinum	4,200,000^{‡}
United States (RIAA)	Gold	1,000,000^{^}
Streaming
Greece (IFPI Greece)	2× Platinum	4,000,000^{†}
^{^} Shipments figures based on certification alone.^{‡} Sales+streaming figures based on certification alone.^{†} Streaming-only figures based on certification alone.

== The Corrs version ==
"Dreams"

Single by the Corrs

from the album Talk on Corners
- B-side: "The Right Time" (live); "Queen of Hollywood" (live); "Haste to the Wedding" (live)
- Released: May 1998
- Genre: Pop; disco (Todd Terry remix)
- Length: 4:18
- Label: 143; Lava; Atlantic
- Songwriter: Stevie Nicks
- Producer: Oliver Leiber

The Corrs singles chronology
"What Can I Do" (1998)	"Dreams" (1998)	"What Can I Do" (Tin Tin Out remix) (1998)

Music video
- "Dreams" on YouTube

Irish band the Corrs originally recorded "Dreams" for Legacy: A Tribute to Fleetwood Mac's Rumours, the 20th anniversary album of cover versions which also featured "Don't Stop" by Elton John, "You Make Loving Fun" by Jewel and others from the Goo Goo Dolls and the Cranberries. The cover version was originally recorded similar to the original song until Oliver Leiber transformed the recording into a dance track mixed with a violin and tin whistle hook. It was then remixed by Todd Terry for single release and became the first big hit for the Corrs in the UK, reaching number six on the UK Singles Chart and staying on the chart for 10 weeks. The video, directed by Dani Jacobs and filmed in Singapore, also won the "Best Adult Contemporary Video" award from Billboard magazine in 1998. The Corrs' second studio album, Talk on Corners, was then re-released with "Dreams" added.

The Corrs performed "Dreams" with Mick Fleetwood from Fleetwood Mac in their concert at the Royal Albert Hall on St. Patrick's Day, 1998 (which was also Caroline Corr's 25th birthday).

=== Critical reception ===
Larry Flick from Billboard magazine wrote, "The Corrs bring an interesting Celtic flavor to the first pop single from Legacy: A Tribute to Fleetwood Mac's Rumours. Although it's difficult to let go of the intense drama of the original recording, the act's earnest delivery is to be commended and appreciated. In an effort to better connect with the kids of crossover radio, club icon Todd Terry has been enlisted to remix the song with a more forceful disco sound. It was a wise move that gives this single a fighting chance in drawing the positive attention of the pop masses." The Scottish Daily Record praised the cover version as "superb".

Music Week felt the classic "is given an uplifting Celtic overhaul on this breezy, radio-friendly cover which has Andrea Corr's gorgeous vocal joined by violin and tin whistle. With airplay already building and the familiarity of the song, 'Dreams' should see the quartet reaching even further than their ever-growing fanbase." An editor from Sunday Mirror stated that "Ireland's three most beautiful women and their brother should finally crack it over here with this Todd Terry remix."

=== Music video ===
A music video was produced to accompany the song, directed by British music video director and editor Dani Jacobs. Shot in Singapore on April 10, 1998 at the Thian Hock Keng Temple during the bands promotional tour of South Asia. It won the "Best Adult Contemporary Video" award from Billboard magazine in 1998. The video was made available on YouTube in 2009 and as of early 2025, it had generated more than 28 million views. The video for the Todd Terry Remix was made available on the platform in 2014.

=== Track listings ===
- UK CD1
1. "Dreams" (Tee's radio) – 3:53
2. "Dreams" (Tee's new radio) – 3:32
3. "Dreams" (TNT Pop extended) – 7:38
4. "Dreams" (Tee's club) – 7:39
5. "Dreams" (In House mix) – 4:32
- UK CD2 (recorded live at the Albert Hall on 17 March 1998)
1. "Dreams" – 5:21
2. "The Right Time" – 3:52
3. "Queen of Hollywood" – 4:56
4. "Haste to the Wedding" – 3:38
- UK cassette single
1. "Dreams" (Tee's radio) – 3:53
2. "Dreams" (Tee's AC radio) – 3:49
- European CD single
1. "Dreams" (radio edit) – 3:59
2. "Dreams" (Tee's radio) – 3:53
- Australian and Japanese CD single
1. "Dreams" (radio edit) – 3:59
2. "Dreams" (Tee's radio) – 3:53
3. "Dreams" (Tee's new radio) – 3:32
4. "Dreams" (TNT Pop extended mix) – 8:40
5. "Dreams" (Tee's club) – 7:39
6. "Dreams" (In House mix) – 4:32

=== Charts ===
==== Weekly charts ====
Chart (1998)	Peak position
Australia (ARIA)	47
Belgium (Ultratip Bubbling Under Flanders)	14
Canada Top Singles (RPM)	38
Canada Adult Contemporary (RPM)	10
Europe (Eurochart Hot 100)	24
France (SNEP)	52
Germany (GfK)	73
Hungary (Mahasz)	9
Ireland (IRMA)	6
Italy Airplay (Music & Media)	2
Netherlands (Dutch Top 40 Tipparade)	10
Netherlands (Single Top 100)	71
Scottish Singles Sales (Official Charts)	5
Spain (AFYVE)	5
UK Singles (Official Charts)	6
UK Airplay (Music Week)	5

==== Year-end charts ====
Chart (1998)	Position
Canada Adult Contemporary (RPM)	64
UK Singles (OCC)	95

=== Certifications ===
Region	Certification	Certified units/sales
United Kingdom (BPI)	Silver	200,000^{^}
^{^} Shipments figures based on certification alone.

=== Release history ===
Region	Date	Format(s)	Label(s)	Ref.
Ireland	May 1998	—N/a	143; Lava; Atlantic	
Japan	2 May 1998	CD	143; Lava; Atlantic	
United Kingdom	4 May 1998	CD; cassette	143; Lava; Atlantic	
United States	19 May 1998	Contemporary hit radio	Lava; Atlantic	

== Deep Dish version ==
"Dreams"

Single by Deep Dish featuring Stevie Nicks

from the album George Is On
- Released: 17 April 2006
- Genre: Electronica
- Length: 4:39 (album version); 3:47 (radio edit)
- Label: Deep Dish; Positiva
- Songwriter: Stevie Nicks
- Producer: Dubfire & Sharam

Deep Dish singles chronology
"Sacramento" (2005)	"Dreams" (2006)	"Be the Change" (2006)

Stevie Nicks singles chronology
"Sorcerer" (2001)	"Dreams" (2006)	"Rock and Roll" (2007)

Music video
- "Dreams" on YouTube

Nicks contributed new vocals to a remake of "Dreams" by electronic music duo Deep Dish. The song appears on their second album, George Is On (2005), and was a top-20 UK Singles Chart hit and climbed to number 26 on the US Dance Club Play chart. An edited version of the song is included on Nicks' 2007 album Crystal Visions – The Very Best of Stevie Nicks. In the music video, directed by Honey, model and actress Winter Ave Zoli plays as the protagonist.

=== Charts ===
==== Weekly charts ====
Chart (2006)	Peak position
Australia (ARIA)	27
Australian Club Chart (ARIA)	2
Australian Dance (ARIA)	5
Belgium (Ultratop 50 Flanders)	42
Finland (Suomen virallinen lista)	6
Hungary (Dance Top 40)	5
Ireland (IRMA)	22
Netherlands (Dutch Top 40)	18
Netherlands (Single Top 100)	29
Scottish Singles Sales (Official Charts)	8
UK Singles (Official Charts)	14
UK Dance (Official Charts)	4
US Dance Club Songs (Billboard)	26
US Dance Airplay (Billboard)	2

==== Year-end charts ====
Chart (2006)	Position
Australian Club Chart (ARIA)	16
Australian Dance (ARIA)	25
Hungary (Dance Top 40)	46

=== Release history ===
Region	Date	Format(s)	Label(s)	Ref.
United Kingdom	17 April 2006	CD	Positiva	
United Kingdom	24 April 2006	12-inch vinyl	Positiva	
Australia	8 May 2006	CD	Sony BMG Australia	

== Nathan Apodaca and TikTok virality ==
In 2020, after his truck broke down, an Idaho man named Nathan Apodaca filmed himself riding his skateboard to work while drinking Ocean Spray cran-raspberry juice and lip-syncing to "Dreams". The video went viral, garnering over 50 million views around the world. As a result, "Dreams" skyrocketed in popularity, reappearing on many worldwide music charts. Mick Fleetwood, Lindsey Buckingham, and Stevie Nicks released responses to Apodaca's video on TikTok, with Nicks riding a skateboard while performing the song. Subsequently, Ocean Spray gave Nathan a brand new pickup truck after Ocean Spray received unexpected publicity when the video went viral.

== Jolyon Petch version ==
In 2021, the New Zealand-born, Australian-based DJ, Jolyon Petch released a version of the song that became a Number 1 track on the ARIA Top 50 Club Tracks chart. The cover, featuring an uncredited vocal from the reality TV star Reigan, peaked at number 16 on the main Australian singles chart. The single went on to be nominated in the category of Best Dance Release at the 2021 ARIA Music Awards but lost out to "Alive" by Rüfüs Du Sol. It was certified 2× Platinum by Australian Recording Industry Association (ARIA) in 2022.

== See also ==
- List of highest-certified singles in Australia
