= The Right Time (The Corrs song) =

1996 single by the Corrs

- European cover art

Single by the Corrs

from the album Forgiven, Not Forgotten
- B-side: "Erin Shore"
- Released: 6 February 1996
- Studio: Chartmaker (Malibu, California)
- Genre: Pop
- Length: 3:34
- Label: 143; Lava; Atlantic
- Songwriter: The Corrs
- Producers: David Foster; Jim Corr; Per Adebratt (remix); Tommy Ekman (remix); Douglas Carr (remix)

The Corrs singles chronology
"Forgiven, Not Forgotten" (1996)	"The Right Time" (1996)	"Love to Love You" (1996)

"The Right Time" is a song by Celtic folk rock band the Corrs, the third single from their debut album, Forgiven, Not Forgotten (1995). It was released in 1996 and the track was remixed for airplay. The remix replaced a light and breezy rhythm with a hard, pounding beat coupled with reggae-style bass. The remix was produced by Per Adebratt, Tommy Ekman, and Douglas Carr, who had previously worked with Ace of Base. The song was featured in the Corr's live sets for several years.

"The Right Time" was targeted at pop radio by Atlantic US, hence the video theme of 1960s pop tinged with psychedelic, and the band's new haircuts and publicity photos. The new style lasted around a week before the Corrs' classic look returned. The video for the track was originally filmed and released with the "Radio Edit – Dance Mix" version; promotion was done with this version too. The album edit video can be found on the Best of The Corrs DVD.

Warner's international territories released "Forgiven, Not Forgotten" as the second single from the album of the same name, while Atlantic US went straight to "The Right Time". The single was a commercial failure in the United States, where it failed to enter the Billboard Hot 100 and barely entered the Adult Top 40 chart, inching to number 37.

== Critical reception ==
Larry Flick from Billboard felt that "The Right Time" "could easily elevate this incredibly appealing act to the level of Ace of Base." He added, "This single certainly has the elements to connect with that Swedish act's following: Shuffling reggae/pop beats, chirpy female harmonies, and a sugary chorus will leave you humming for hours. The twist is the continual thread of lively Celtic fiddling. Yummy, yummy ..." Steve Baltin from Cash Box viewed it as a "perky pop tune." He also wrote, "Produced by hitmaker David Foster, "The Right Time" offers highly accessible vocals in front of a friendly Ace of Base type melody. A guaranteed hit at CHR, "The Right Time" could lift the Corrs to the next level of pop stardom."

== Music video ==
The accompanying music video for "The Right Time" was directed by Kevin Bray, and had a theme based on 1960s television. Each band member would be playing their respective instrument and singing alone in a different room, as well as the entire group performing together, in another room. The black-and-white square rooms, mirrors, multiple layered shots of one person, and “Alice in Wonderland” effects (a seemingly “giant” person looking inside of a dollhouse window) gave the video a sense of the “futuristic” or “psychedelic” feel of early visual effects, notably the 1960s.

== Track listings ==
- European CD single
1. "The Right Time" (radio edit) – 3:34
2. "The Right Time" (LP version) – 4:07
3. "Erin Shore" (LP version) – 4:14
- European CD single
1. "The Right Time" (radio edit) – 3:36
2. "The Right Time" (acoustic version) – 3:02
3. "The Right Time" (album version) – 4:07

== Charts ==
Chart (1996–1997)	Peak position
Australia (ARIA)	44
Canada Top Singles (RPM)	32
Canada Adult Contemporary (RPM)	4
Germany (GfK)	76
Hungary Airplay (HCRA)	9
Scottish Singles Sales (Official Charts)	63
Spain (AFYVE)	32
UK Singles (Official Charts)	82
US Bubbling Under Hot 100 (Billboard)	12
US Adult Pop Airplay (Billboard)	37

== Release history ==
Region	Date	Format(s)	Label(s)	Ref.
United States	6 February 1996	Contemporary hit radio	143; Lava; Atlantic	
Ireland	April 1996	—N/a	143; Lava; Atlantic	
United Kingdom	13 May 1996	CD; cassette	143; Lava; Atlantic	
