= Haste to the Wedding (jig) =

18th-century song

"Haste to the Wedding" (Note: Other names include: Haste to the Wedding, Come Haste, Haste To The West, Haste Ye Tae The Wedding, Hasten To The Wedding, Hasten To The Wedding Mary, Rural Felicity, The Rules of Felicity, Fast Trip To Reno, Quick Trip To Reno, Gigue Des Petits Moutons, Green Mountain Volunteers, The Long Eight, Perry’s Victory, Footprints, Granny Plays the Fiddle, Trip to the Dargle, A Trip to the Gargle, Let Brainspinning Swains, The Small Pin Cushion, Carrickfergus, Thurot, and Cut Your Toenails You’re Tearing All The Sheets.) is a jig tune in the English, Scottish, Irish, Canadian, and American musical traditions. The tune originated during the 18th century, although its original composer is not certain. Written in the standard 8-bar AABB format of dance tunes, it is traditionally performed on the fiddle, but is a simple tune which can be performed on a variety of instruments, and is frequently adapted for session music. The tune has also been used as the basis for songs, and as musical accompaniment for ceili dances of the same name.

== History ==
The earliest known source for the tune is James Oswald's "Caledonian Pocket Companion", volume 10, page 8 (London, 1759), where it is titled "The Small Pin Cushion". No source or composer is listed, which in Oswald's collections sometimes means he wrote it himself.

"The tune 'Come, Haste to the Wedding', of Gaelic origin, was introduced in the pantomime 'The Elopement' in 1767. This version is known as the Manx tune and was printed by the Percy society in 1846. It is the basis for the Manx ballad, 'The Capture of Carrickfergusby,' written by Thurot in 1760 (Linscott)." One of the tunes associated with the dance "Lady in the Lake" in N.H./ Widely known in the USA: in the repertory of Buffalo Valley, Pa., dance fiddler Harry Daddario.

According to one theory, the name "Haste to the Wedding" derives from a tradition in County Donegal, Ireland, where the tune was played as the bride marched from her family home to the church on her wedding day. During the wedding of Queen Victoria and Prince Albert at St James's Palace in 1840, "Haste to the Wedding" was played by a marching band to the thousands waiting outside the chapel for the Queen's arrival.

== In song ==
=== Traditional lyrics ===
Haste to the Wedding/Rural Felicity

Come haste to the wedding ye friends and ye neighbours
The lovers their bliss can no longer delay.
Forget all your sorrows your cares and your labors,
And let every heart beat with rapture today.

Come, come one and all, attend to my call,
And revel in pleasures that never can cloy.
Come see rural felicity,
Which love and innocence ever enjoy.

Let Envy, Let Pride, Let Hate & Ambition,
Still Crowd to, & beat at the breast of the Great,
To Such Wretched Passions we Give no admission,
But Leave them alone to the wise ones of State.

We Boast of No wealth, but Contentment & Health,
In mirth & in Friendship, our moments employ
Come see rural felicity,
Which love and innocence ever enjoy.

With Reason we taste of Each Heart Stirring pleasure,
With Reason we Drink of the full flowing Bowl,
Are Jocund & Gay, But 'tis all within measure,
For fatal excess will enslave the free Soul,

Then Come at our bidding to this Happy wedding,
No Care Shall obtrude here, our Bliss to annoy,
Come see rural felicity,
Which love and innocence ever enjoy.

=== In popular music ===
"Haste to the Wedding (live)"

Song by the Corrs

from the album In Blue
- Released: April 2000
- Recorded: 17 July 1999
- Venue: Dublin, Ireland
- Length: 5:00
- Label: 143, Lava, Atlantic
- Songwriter: Traditional

"Haste to the Wedding" was recorded by English folk rock group Fairport Convention as part of a medley of tunes—"Royal Selleccion Number 13"—on the 1977 album The Bonny Bunch of Roses.

"Haste to the Wedding" has been extensively played by Irish pop rock band the Corrs during their live performances. The most notable performance is the one from their 1999 concert The Corrs Live at Lansdowne Road which was later included as a bonus track on the special edition release of their 2000 album, In Blue.

In 2005, the Corrs recorded a studio version of the song for their Irish-themed album Home.

== In dance ==
In Scottish country dance, Haste to the Wedding is a progressive dance for 4 couples. The dance repeats after every 32 bars of music with couples in new positions.

In Irish ceili dance, Haste to the Wedding is also a progressive dance, but for any number of groups of 2 couples. The dance originated in the north of Ireland, and is collected in Ar Rinci Ceili, the ceili manual of An Coimisiún Le Rincí Gaelacha (the Irish Dancing Commission). In this version, it takes 48 bars of music to complete once.
