= Toss the Feathers =

Irish folk tune

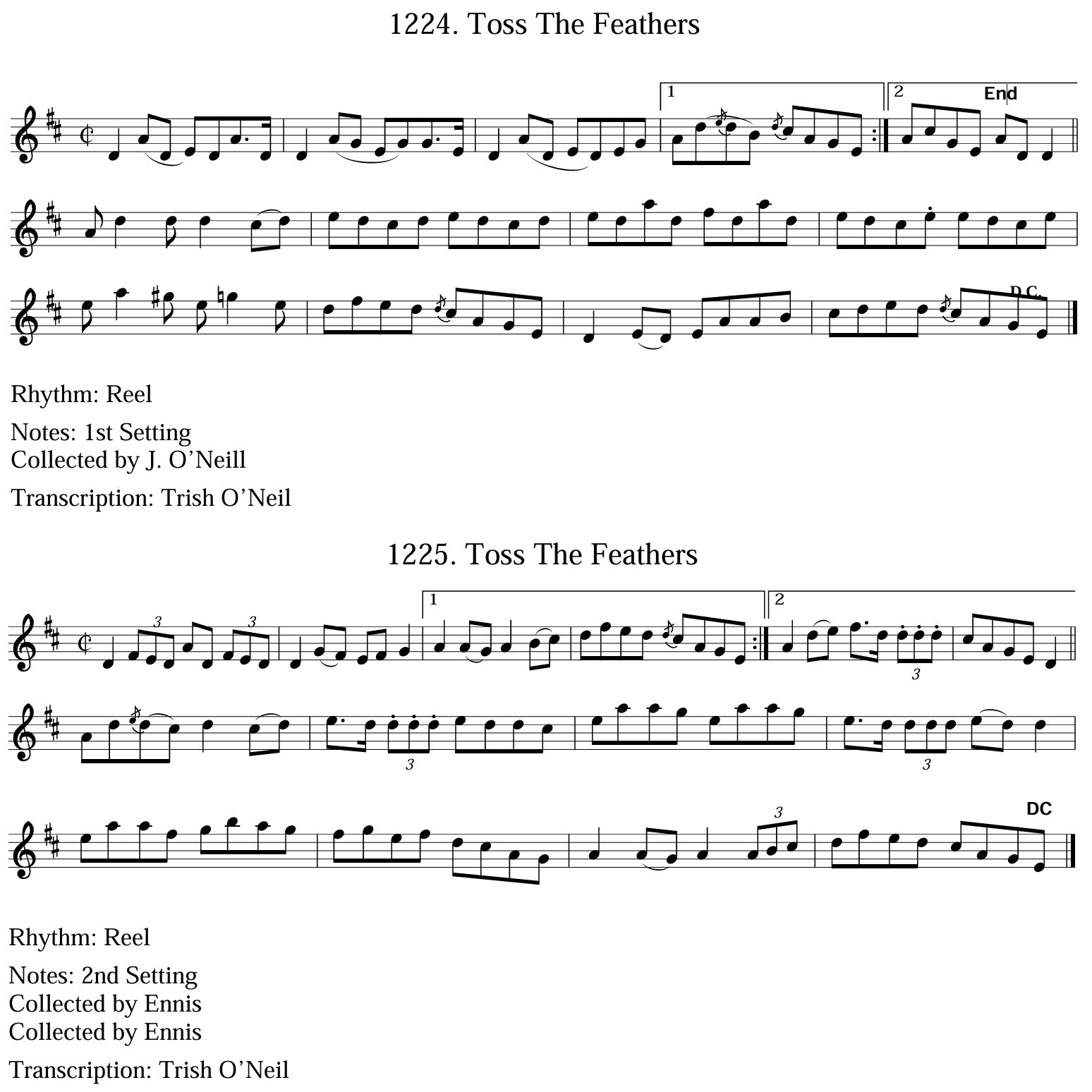
- Sheet music from O'Neill's Music of Ireland

Song
- Published: 1903
- Genre: Irish folk

"Toss the Feathers" is a traditional Irish folk tune (a reel). It exists in several variations and in different keys, the most common being D Mixolydian and E Dorian. The tune has been adapted in over 200 modern compilations, including both traditional versions by individuals like Joe Cooley, Tony MacMahon, Mike "Razz" Russell and groups such as The Chieftains, and rock renditions such as that by The Corrs on their album Forgiven, Not Forgotten. Horslips adapted the core melody in their song Sword of Light.

There is also a radio program from Columbus, Ohio with the namesake which airs 4-6pm (ET) every Saturday. This program is broadcast through WCBE (a local NPR station streamed live for worldwide listening). It is independently produced and hosted by Anna Oscard.

"Toss the Feathers" has been adopted as a name by two different bands, one based in Manchester, England and one in upstate New York, USA.

== See also ==
- Music of Ireland
- Folk rock
