= Forgiven, Not Forgotten (song) =

1996 single by the Corrs

- European and Australian cover art

Single by the Corrs

from the album Forgiven, Not Forgotten
- B-side: "Heaven Knows"
- Released: February 1996
- Studio: Chartmaker (Malibu, California)
- Length: 4:15
- Label: 143; Atlantic; Lava
- Songwriter: The Corrs
- Producers: David Foster; Jim Corr

The Corrs singles chronology
"Runaway" (1995)	"Forgiven, Not Forgotten" (1996)	"The Right Time" (1996)

Music video
- "Forgiven, Not Forgotten" on YouTube

"Forgiven, Not Forgotten" is a song by Irish band the Corrs. Warner Bros. Records released the song as the second single from the band's debut studio album, Forgiven, Not Forgotten, in February 1996. In the United States, Atlantic Records issued "The Right Time" as the album's second single instead, with "Forgiven, Not Forgotten" serving as the third single.

== Music video ==
Just one day after this video was shot, the Corrs were also filming the video for their next single, "The Right Time". However, Atlantic US skipped "Forgiven, Not Forgotten" and did not release it as a single.

The theme for the video is dark and brooding, which fits to the more serious lyrics about someone who has committed suicide and left someone else behind. The band is all dressed in black, the girl's makeup is very pale and there is not a lot of smiling. The video itself is pretty lowkey but yet effective in showing the Corrs on a rotating platform with various landscapes appearing behind them. "Forgiven Not Forgotten" was shot in Santa Monica, California.

Not only did the platform make some of the viewers nauseous, but Andrea felt seasick after being on the circling stage for hours. The shoot took from about 7:00am to 11:00pm to film.

== Track listings ==
UK cassette single

1. "Forgiven, Not Forgotten" (LP version) – 4:16
2. "Forgiven, Not Forgotten" (live acoustic version) – 3:54

US CD and cassette single

1. "Forgiven, Not Forgotten" (radio album version) – 4:16
2. "Forgiven, Not Forgotten" (live acoustic version) – 3:54

European and Australian maxi-single

1. "Forgiven, Not Forgotten" (LP version) – 4:16
2. "Forgiven, Not Forgotten" (live acoustic version) – 3:54
3. "Heaven Knows" (LP version) – 4:18

== Charts ==
Chart (1996)	Peak position
Australia (ARIA)	15
Canada Top Singles (RPM)	31
Canada Adult Contemporary (RPM)	43
Spain (AFYVE)	35
UK Singles (OCC)	155

== Release history ==
Region	Date	Format(s)	Label(s)	Ref.
Ireland	February 1996	—N/a	143; Atlantic; Lava	
United States	16 July 1996	Contemporary hit radio	143; Atlantic; Lava	
United Kingdom	22 July 1996	CD; cassette	143; Atlantic; Lava	
