= 143 Records =

US record label

- Parent company: Warner Music Group
- Founded: 1994
- Founder: David Foster
- Defunct: 2001
- Status: Defunct
- Distributor(s): Warner Records; Atlantic Records
- Genre: Various
- Country of origin: U.S.
- Official website: www.143records.com

143 Records was the record label of producer David Foster. 143 was a sub-label of Warner Records and Atlantic Records. The numbers 1-4-3 are derived from the words "I (1 letter) love (4 letters) you (3 letters)."

== History ==
When record producer David Foster signed a deal with Warner Bros. in 1995, it enabled him to start 143 Records. Foster gave the responsibility for running the label to manager Brian Avnet. One of the label's first signing was Irish folk-rock band the Corrs.

In 1997 Foster and Avnet concluded "logo labels" like 143 were in a "bad spot". Foster sold the label back to Warner and then became senior vice-president at the corporation. On September 20, 2001, Warner Music Group announced it was shutting down the label.

== Roster ==
- Michael Bublé
- Peter Cincotti
- The Corrs
- Jackie Evancho
- Josh Groban
- Beth Hart
- Jordan Hill (through Atlantic)
- William Joseph
- Lace
- Ezekiel Lewis
- Renee Olstead
- Plus One
- Jake Zyrus
- theSTART
