= The Works (The Corrs album) =

Compilation album by The Corrs
- Released: 25 September 2007
- Genre: Pop; folk rock
- Label: Rhino

The Corrs chronology
Dreams: The Ultimate Corrs Collection (2006)	The Works (2007)	White Light (2015)

The Works is the third compilation album released by The Corrs. It consists of three CDs featuring selected songs that were released on their previous albums. It was released on 25 September 2007.

== Track listing ==
=== Disc 1 ===
1. "Runaway" (from Forgiven, Not Forgotten)
2. "Dreams" (from Talk on Corners)
3. "What Can I Do?" (from Talk on Corners)
4. "Irresistible" (from In Blue)
5. "I Never Loved You Anyway" (from Talk on Corners)
6. "Love to Love You" (from Forgiven, Not Forgotten)
7. "Forgiven, Not Forgotten" (from Forgiven, Not Forgotten)
8. "Leave Me Alone" (from Forgiven, Not Forgotten)
9. "Secret Life" (from Forgiven, Not Forgotten)
10. "The Right Time" (from Forgiven, Not Forgotten)
11. "Heaven Knows" (from Forgiven, Not Forgotten)
12. "Someday" (from Forgiven, Not Forgotten)
13. "Closer" (from Forgiven, Not Forgotten)
14. "When He's Not Around" (from Talk on Corners)
15. "Don't Say You Love Me" (from Talk on Corners)
16. "Love Gives Love Takes" (from Talk on Corners)
17. "Hopelessly Addicted" (from Talk on Corners)
18. "(Lough) Erin Shore" (from Forgiven, Not Forgotten)

=== Disc 2 ===
1. "Breathless" (from In Blue)
2. "So Young" (from Talk on Corners)
3. "Radio" (from In Blue)
4. "Give Me a Reason" (from In Blue)
5. "Only When I Sleep" (from Talk on Corners)
6. "Intimacy" (from Talk on Corners)
7. "Queen of Hollywood" (from Talk on Corners)
8. "No Good for Me" (from Talk on Corners)
9. "Little Wing" (from Talk on Corners)
10. "All the Love in the World" (from In Blue)
11. "All in a Day" (from In Blue)
12. "At Your Side" (from In Blue)
13. "No More Cry" (from In Blue)
14. "Give It All Up" (from In Blue)
15. "Say" (from In Blue)
16. "One Night" (From In Blue)
17. "Rain" (from In Blue)
18. "Hurt Before" (from In Blue)
19. "Rebel Heart" (from In Blue)

=== Disc 3 ===
1. "Summer Sunshine" (from Borrowed Heaven)
2. "Angel" (from Borrowed Heaven)
3. "Long Night" (from Borrowed Heaven)
4. "Old Town" (from Home)
5. "Heart Like a Wheel" (from Home)
6. "Black Is the Colour" (From Home)
7. "Haste to the Wedding" (from Home)
8. "No Frontiers" (from Unplugged)
9. "Love in the Milky Way" (from In Blue special edition)
10. "Looking in the Eyes of Love" (from In Blue special edition)
11. "Somebody for Someone" (acoustic; from In Blue special edition)
12. "No More Cry" (acoustic; from In Blue special edition)
13. "At Your Side" (acoustic; from In Blue special edition)
14. "When the Stars Go Blue" with Bono (from Dreams)
15. "Dreams (Tee's Radio Remix)" (from Dreams)
16. "So Young" (K-Klass Remix; from Talk on Corners special edition)
17. "What Can I Do (Tin Tin Out Remix)" (from Talk on Corners special edition)
18. "Radio (Unplugged)"
19. "Goodbye" (2006 remix; from Dreams)
