= Unplugged (The Corrs album) =

The Corrs Unplugged

Live album by the Corrs
- Released: 12 November 1999
- Recorded: 5 October 1999
- Venues: Ardmore Studios, Bray, County Wicklow, Ireland
- Genres: Pop rock; orchestral pop; Celtic fusion; folk rock
- Length: 68:17 (CD); 72 minutes (VHS, DVD)
- Labels: Atlantic; 143; Lava
- Producers: The Corrs; Mitchell Froom

The Corrs chronology
Talk on Corners (1997)	The Corrs Unplugged (1999)	In Blue (2000)

Professional ratings
Review scores
Source	Rating
AllMusic	3/5 stars
MTV Asia	8/10

The Corrs Unplugged is the third album (and the first visual recording) by Irish band The Corrs, filmed and released in the fall of 1999. The album is part of the iconic MTV Unplugged series, which features musicians performing in a more acoustic, “stripped-down” concert setting. Initially, the album was released internationally, albeit not in the United States until a year later, after the band had experienced further success with their single “Breathless” and their fourth album In Blue, with both releases earning them their highest chart positions to-date in the US.

The “MTV Unplugged” session was recorded with a small, invitation-only audience, and features the Irish Film Orchestra accompanying the band on most of their songs. The album was recorded live on 5 October 1999 at Ardmore Studios, Bray, County Wicklow, Ireland, and was released on CD, MiniDisc, DVD, VCD and VHS. The compact-disc version features the songs in a somewhat different order to that in which they were actually performed, and the Fleetwood Mac cover “Dreams” was strangely omitted from the CD (but featured as a bonus track on some releases). The DVD and VHS retains the original song order, and is mostly unedited, while the CD edits out almost all of the talking and introductions between songs.

In addition to The Corrs’ familiar songs, plus two Irish tunes from their debut album (“Toss the Feathers”, “Lough Erin Shore”), the “Unplugged” album features several new songs. The band performed a heartfelt version of the R.E.M. song “Everybody Hurts”, as well as debuting two unreleased compositions: the songs “Radio” and “At Your Side”, with lyrics by Sharon Corr, would eventually go on to be re-recorded and featured on their album In Blue, the following year. The Jimi Hendrix song “Little Wing” features a stellar steel guitar solo by the band’s longtime guitarist, Anto Drennan. The Irish peace-themed duet "No Frontiers" was sung by Sharon and Caroline—who typically play violin and drums, respectively—during their Talk on Corners World Tour European leg in 1998 and 99, and subsequently included on “Unplugged”. The song was originally recorded by Mary Black on her album of the same name (written by Jimmy MacCarthy). The band also performed a rendition of “Old Town” by Phil Lynott.

== Track listing ==
=== CD ===
All tracks are written by the Corrs, except where noted.

No.	Title	Writer(s)	Length
1.	"Only When I Sleep"	Andrea Corr; Sharon Corr; Caroline Corr; Jim Corr; Oliver Leiber; Paul Peterson; John Shanks	4:38
2.	"What Can I Do"		4:36
3.	"Radio"		4:51
4.	"Toss the Feathers"	Traditional (arranged by the Corrs)	3:14
5.	"Runaway"		4:36
6.	"Forgiven Not Forgotten"		5:22
7.	"At Your Side"		4:33
8.	"Little Wing"	Jimi Hendrix	4:41
9.	"No Frontiers"	Jimmy McCarthy	4:28
10.	"Queen of Hollywood"	The Corrs; Glen Ballard; Dane Deviller; Sean Hosein	4:44
11.	"Old Town (This Boy Is Cracking Up)"	Jimmy Bain; Phil Lynott	3:09
12.	"(Lough) Erin Shore"	Traditional (arranged by the Corrs)	4:25
13.	"So Young"		4:53
14.	"Everybody Hurts"	Bill Berry; Peter Buck; Mike Mills; Michael Stipe	5:45

Bonus track – on German issue release
No.	Title	Length
15.	"At Your Side" (remix version)	4:22

Bonus track – on some releases
No.	Title	Writer(s)	Length
16.	"Dreams"	Stevie Nicks	3:43

=== DVD and VHS track listing ===
1. "Only When I Sleep"
2. "What Can I Do"
3. "Radio"
4. "Toss The Feathers"
5. "Everybody Hurts"
6. "Dreams"
7. "Runaway"
8. "Forgiven Not Forgotten"
9. "At Your Side"
10. "Little Wing"
11. "No Frontiers"
12. "Queen Of Hollywood"
13. "Old Town (This Boy Is Cracking Up)"
14. "(Lough) Erin Shore"
15. "So Young"

== Personnel ==
=== The Corrs ===
- Andrea Corr – lead vocals, tin whistle
- Caroline Corr – drums, tambourine, bodhrán, conga, piano, backing vocals, co-lead vocals on "No Frontiers"
- Sharon Corr – violin, backing vocals, co-lead vocals on "No Frontiers"
- Jim Corr – acoustic guitar, piano, backing vocals

=== Guest musicians ===
- Anthony Drennan – acoustic guitar, dobro
- Keith Duffy – bass guitar, percussion
- Mitchell Froom – Hammond organ, piano
- The Irish Film Orchestra conducted by Fiachra Trench – orchestration

=== Technical ===
- Engineers – Tim Martin and Tim Summerhayes
- Producers – Mitchell Froom and the Corrs

== Charts ==
=== Album charts ===
Chart (1999-2000)	Peak position
Australian Albums (ARIA)	14
Austrian Albums (Ö3 Austria)	1
Belgian Albums (Ultratop Flanders)	2
Belgian Albums (Ultratop Wallonia)	3
Danish Albums (Tracklisten)	6
Dutch Albums (Album Top 100)	3
European Albums (Billboard)	5
French Albums (SNEP)	5
German Albums (Offizielle Top 100)	6
Hungarian Albums (MAHASZ)	37
Irish Albums (IRMA)	1
Malaysian Albums (RIM)	7
New Zealand Albums (RMNZ)	17
Norwegian Albums (VG-lista)	4
Portuguese Albums (AFP)	4
Spanish Albums (Promúsicae)	8
Swedish Albums (Sverigetopplistan)	30
Swiss Albums (Schweizer Hitparade)	3
UK Albums (Official Charts)	7

=== Video charts ===
Chart (1999)	Peak position
UK Videos (OCC)	4

=== Year-end charts ===
Chart (1999)	Position
Australian Albums (ARIA)	98
UK Albums (OCC)	31

Chart (2000)	Position
Australian Albums (ARIA)	77
Austrian Albums (Ö3 Österreich)	4
Belgian Albums (Ultratop Flanders)	25
Belgian Albums (Ultratop Wallonia)	15
Dutch Albums (MegaCharts)	7
European Albums (Music & Media)	13
French Albums (SNEP)	50
German Albums (GfK)	17
Swiss Albums (Hitparade)	10
UK Albums (OCC)	89

Chart (2001)	Position
Dutch Albums (MegaCharts)	29

== Certifications ==
=== Album certifications ===
Region	Certification	Certified units/sales
Australia (ARIA)	Platinum	70,000^{^}
Austria (IFPI Austria)	Platinum	50,000^{*}
Belgium (BRMA)	Gold	25,000^{*}
France (SNEP)	Platinum	300,000^{*}
Germany (BVMI)	3× Gold	450,000^{^}
Ireland (IRMA)	8× Platinum	120,000^{^}
Italy (FIMI)	Platinum	100,000^{*}
Netherlands (NVPI)	2× Platinum	200,000^{^}
New Zealand (RMNZ)	Gold	7,500^{^}
Norway (IFPI Norway)	Platinum	50,000^{*}
Spain (Promusicae)	3× Platinum	300,000^{^}
Sweden (GLF)	Gold	40,000^{^}
Switzerland (IFPI Switzerland)	Platinum	50,000^{^}
United Kingdom (BPI)	2× Platinum	600,000^{^}
Summaries
Europe (IFPI)	2× Platinum	2,000,000^{*}
^{*} Sales figures based on certification alone.^{^} Shipments figures based on certification alone.

=== Video certifications ===
Region	Certification	Certified units/sales
Australia (ARIA)	Platinum	15,000^{^}
Austria (IFPI Austria)	Gold	5,000^{*}
Brazil (Pro-Música Brasil)	Gold	25,000^{*}
United Kingdom (BPI)	Platinum	50,000^{*}
^{*} Sales figures based on certification alone.^{^} Shipments figures based on certification alone.

== Release history ==
- November 12, 1999, Belgium, Ireland, Sweden, Atlantic 7567-80986-2, CD
- November 15, 1999, Europe, Canada, UK, Atlantic 7567-80986-2, CD
- November 12, 1999, Singapore, Atlantic 7567-80986-2/4, CD (with bonus track)
- November 29, 1999, Australia, Atlantic 7567-80992-2, CD (with "Dreams" bonus track)
- November 25, 1999, Japan, Warner AMCY-7120, CD (with "Dreams" bonus track)
- December 3, 1999, Mexico, Atlantic CS 809862–8, CD (with "Dreams" bonus track)
- February 28, 2000, Germany, Atlantic 0756-792890-2, CD (reissue, with different bonus track)
- November 12, 2001, Taiwan, Warner 7567-80986-2, CD (with bonus disk of "Rainy Day" 7567-80986-4)
- January 2004, Australia, Warner 7567-93277-2, CD (double album with The Best of The Corrs)
