= Give Me a Reason (The Corrs song) =

2001 song by the Corrs

Single by the Corrs

from the album In Blue
- B-side: "Rebel Heart" (remix); "Paddy McCarthy" (live); "Queen of Hollywood" (live)
- Released: February 2001
- Studio: Westland (Dublin, Ireland)
- Genre: Dance-pop
- Length: 3:30
- Label: 143; Atlantic; Lava
- Songwriter: The Corrs
- Producer: The Corrs

The Corrs singles chronology
"Irresistible" (2000)	"Give Me a Reason" (2001)	"All the Love in the World" (2001)

Music video
- "Give Me a Reason" on YouTube

"Give Me a Reason" is a song written, produced, and performed by Irish pop rock band the Corrs. It was released in February 2001 as the third single from their third studio album, In Blue (2000). "Give Me a Reason" is a dance-pop song and received favourable reviews from music critics. The song reached number 27 in the United Kingdom and number 13 in New Zealand.

== Background and release ==
"Give Me a Reason" was released as the third single from In Blue (2000) in February 2001. The CD single included two versions of "Give Me a Reason" (the album version and the Cutfather & Joe remix, which was used for the music video), a "Live Instrumental" version of "Paddy McCarthy" and a "Live" version of "Queen of Hollywood". "Give Me a Reason" was written and produced by the Corrs (Andrea, Caroline, Sharon and Jim). The dance-pop song has Andrea on the centre speaker with the backing vocals on the other speakers. The song was included on their 2001 compilation album, Best of The Corrs.

== Reception ==
=== Critical response ===
The song received favourable reviews from music critics. For Lydia Vanderloo of Barnes & Noble, "Songs such as the defiant 'Give Me a Reason' use the subtle, graceful strains of these lovely instruments without throwing their finely calibrated pop songs out of whack." Kevin Oliver of PopMatters commented, " On the upbeat dance numbers like, 'Give Me a Reason', this bolsters the band's previously thin-sounding pop."

=== Commercial performance ===
In the United Kingdom, "Give Me a Reason" reached number 27 on the UK Singles Chart, becoming the Corrs' ninth top-40 single there. In New Zealand, it debuted at number 40 on the RIANZ Singles Chart on the week of 1 April 2001 and peaked at number 13 on 27 May 2001.

== Music video ==
The official music video for the song features the members in a large building, doing different things. It also has a horse running past Andrea in a hallway. It is a much glossier video than most of their previous videos. It was banned in some countries due to the scene where Jim throws a chair out of a window, breaking it.

== Track listings ==
UK CD and cassette single; European CD single

1. "Give Me a Reason" (Cutfather & Joe remix) – 3:10
2. "Give Me a Reason" (album version) – 3:30
3. "Rebel Heart" (remix) – 4:35

European maxi-CD single

1. "Give Me a Reason" (Cutfather & Joe remix) – 3:10
2. "Give Me a Reason" (album version) – 3:30
3. "Paddy McCarthy" (live instrumental) – 4:16
4. "Queen of Hollywood" (live) – 5:05

Australian CD single

1. "Give Me a Reason" (Cutfather & Joe remix) – 3:10
2. "Give Me a Reason" (album version) – 3:30
3. "Paddy McCarthy" (live instrumental) – 4:16
4. "Irresistible" (album version) – 3:40

== Credits and personnel ==
Credits are taken from the UK CD single liner notes and the In Blue album booklet.

Studios

- Recorded at Westland Studio (Dublin, Ireland)
- Mixed at The Record Plant (Los Angeles)
- Mastered at Gateway Mastering (Portland, Maine, US)

Personnel

- The Corrs – writing, production
  - Andrea Corr – lead vocals, tin whistle
  - Caroline Corr – vocals, drums, bodhrán, percussion
  - Sharon Corr – vocals, violin
  - Jim Corr – vocals, guitar, keyboards
- Keith Duffy – bass guitar
- Tim Martin – recording
- Mike Shipley – mixing
- Bob Ludwig – mastering
- Cutfather & Joe – additional production (Cutfather & Joe remix)
- Mads Nilsson – mixing (Cutfather & Joe remix)
- Elizabeth Barrett – art direction
- Andrea Brooks – art direction, design
- Rankin – cover photography
- Norman Jean Roy – inlay photography

== Charts ==
Chart (2001)	Peak position
Australia (ARIA)	68
Belgium (Ultratip Bubbling Under Flanders)	9
Belgium (Ultratip Bubbling Under Wallonia)	10
Europe (Eurochart Hot 100)	70
Germany (GfK)	100
Netherlands (Dutch Top 40 Tipparade)	9
Netherlands (Single Top 100)	81
New Zealand (Recorded Music NZ)	13
Scottish Singles Sales (Official Charts)	24
Spain (AFYVE)	30
Switzerland (Schweizer Hitparade)	53
UK Singles (Official Charts)	27

== Release history ==
Region	Date	Format(s)	Label(s)	Ref.
Ireland	February 2001	—N/a	143; Atlantic; Lava	
Australia	5 March 2001	CD	143; Atlantic; Lava	
United Kingdom	16 April 2001	CD; cassette	143; Atlantic; Lava	
