= All the Love in the World (The Corrs song) =

2001 song by the Corrs

Single by the Corrs

from the album In Blue
- B-side: "All in a Day" (live)
- Released: 11 June 2001
- Genre: Pop; soft rock
- Length: 4:22 (album version); 3:55 ("Mutt" Lange remix)
- Label: 143; Atlantic; Lava
- Songwriters: Robert John "Mutt" Lange; Andrea Corr; Caroline Corr; Jim Corr; Sharon Corr
- Producer: Robert John "Mutt" Lange

The Corrs singles chronology
"Give Me a Reason" (2001)	"All the Love in the World" (2001)	"Would You Be Happier?" (2001)

"All the Love in the World" is a song by Irish pop rock group the Corrs, taken from their third studio album In Blue (2000). It was released on 11 June 2001 as a promotional single to the 2001 romantic comedy film America's Sweethearts. The song was written by the Corrs and co-written and produced by Robert John "Mutt" Lange. A soft rock ballad, "All the Love in the World" divided music critics; some picked it as one of the best tracks on the album, but others felt it was banal and weak.

== Background and release ==
"All the Love in the World" was originally included on the Corrs third studio album In Blue (2000). The song was later included on the soundtrack of the 2001 romantic comedy film America's Sweethearts, starring Julia Roberts, Catherine Zeta-Jones and John Cusack. It was released as a promotional single to the film, with a remix version being available in its soundtrack and in a promotional single (which includes the album version, as well), and with a music video with scenes of the film being released to further promote it.

"All the Love in the World" was written by the Corrs (Andrea, Caroline, Sharon and Jim), while Robert John "Mutt" Lange co-wrote and produced the song. The pop ballad talks about desiring lifelong love. The remix version was included on their compilation album, "Best of The Corrs" (2001).

== Reception ==
=== Critical response ===
The song received mixed reviews from music critics. Steven McDonald of AllMusic picked the song as one of the best tracks on In Blue and the America's Sweethearts soundtrack. For Lydia Vanderloo of Barnes & Noble, "Songs such as the soft-rock ballad 'All the Love in the World' use the subtle, graceful strains of these lovely instruments without throwing their finely calibrated pop songs out of whack." Kevin Oliver of PopMatters commented, "Lange's heavy hand is evident in Spice Girls-lite balladry like, 'All the Love in the World'."

David Browne of Entertainment Weekly was negative, calling the song "banal," comparing the song to "adult contemporary radio fodder that feels very 1991," citing that the song "is awaiting Celine Dion's return." Jane Stevenson of Jam! considered "All the Love in the World" "one of the album's weaker songs."

=== Commercial performance ===
"All the Love in the World" spent eight weeks on the US Billboard Adult Contemporary chart, reaching number 24.

== Music video ==
The music video featured the band members as actors in different movie sets. Footage from the America's Sweethearts' movie were also shown.

== Charts ==
Chart (2001)	Peak position
US Adult Contemporary (Billboard)	24

== Release history ==
Region	Date	Format(s)	Label(s)	Ref.
United States	11 June 2001	Adult contemporary; hot adult contemporary radio	143; Atlantic; Lava	
United States	14 August 2001	Contemporary hit radio	143; Atlantic; Lava	
