= Best of The Corrs =

2001 best-of album by the Corrs

Compilation album by the Corrs
- Released: 19 October 2001
- Recorded: 1994–2001
- Genres: Pop rock; Celtic fusion
- Length: 71:32
- Labels: Atlantic; 143; Lava
- Producers: The Corrs; David Foster; Mitchell Froom; Oliver Leiber; Tin Tin Out; K-Klass; Robert John "Mutt" Lange; Wayne Wilkins

The Corrs chronology
In Blue (2000)	Best of The Corrs (2001)	VH1 Presents: The Corrs, Live in Dublin (2002)

Singles from Best of The Corrs
- 1. "Would You Be Happier?" Released: 1 October 2001; 2. "Little Lies" Released: 6 October 2023; 3. "Songbird" Released: 27 October 2023

Professional ratings
Review scores
Source	Rating
Allmusic	4/5 stars
MTV Asia	8/10

Best of The Corrs is a compilation album by the Irish pop rock band the Corrs, released in Ireland on 19 October 2001. The album consisted of the band's best-selling singles since their first chart appearance in 1995 with "Runaway", up to the Robert John "Mutt" Lange remix of their 2001 single "All the Love in the World", which charted at number twenty-four on the US Adult Contemporary chart. The album also featured the new single "Would You Be Happier?", as well as a new version of the Talk on Corners outtake, "Make You Mine". By the end of 2001, the album had sold over 2.4 million copies worldwide. By 2017, the album has sold 5 million copies.

In October 2023, the Corrs announced a re-issue of the album on vinyl featuring newly recorded covers of Fleetwood Mac songs "Little Lies", "Everywhere" and "Songbird" to complement their previously released cover of "Dreams". As a tribute to Christine McVie, writer of all three songs, the re-issued vinyl was released on 1 December 2023, a year and a day since McVie's death.

== Track listing ==
All tracks are written by the Corrs, except where noted.

No.	Title	Writer(s)	Album	Length
1.	"Would You Be Happier?"		Previously unreleased, 2001	3:26
2.	"So Young" (K-Klass remix)		Talk on Corners, 1997	4:14
3.	"Runaway" (radio edit)		Forgiven, Not Forgotten, 1995	3:47
4.	"Breathless"	Andrea Corr; Sharon Corr; Caroline Corr; Jim Corr; Robert John "Mutt" Lange	In Blue, 2000	3:28
5.	"Radio" (unplugged radio edit)		The Corrs Unplugged, 1999	4:14
6.	"What Can I Do" (Tin Tin Out remix)		Talk on Corners	4:17
7.	"The Right Time"		Forgiven, Not Forgotten	4:07
8.	"I Never Loved You Anyway" (radio edit)	The Corrs; Carole Bayer Sager	Talk on Corners	3:53
9.	"Irresistible"	The Corrs; Lange	In Blue	3:40
10.	"Forgiven, Not Forgotten"		Forgiven, Not Forgotten	4:15
11.	"Lough Erin Shore" (unplugged version)	Traditional	The Corrs Unplugged	4:28
12.	"Only When I Sleep" (radio edit)	The Corrs; Oliver Leiber; Paul Peterson; John Shanks	Talk on Corners	3:50
13.	"Love to Love You" (radio edit)		Forgiven, Not Forgotten	3:23
14.	"All the Love in the World" (remix)	The Corrs; Lange	In Blue	3:56
15.	"Everybody Hurts" (R.E.M. cover)	Bill Berry; Peter Buck; Mike Mills; Michael Stipe	The Corrs Unplugged	5:49
16.	"Give Me a Reason"		In Blue	3:30
17.	"Dreams"	Stevie Nicks	Talk on Corners	4:01
18.	"Make You Mine"		Previously unreleased, 2001	3:15

Australian and Japanese bonus track
No.	Title	Writer(s)	Album	Length
19.	"Lifting Me"	The Corrs	Previously unreleased, 1999	3:59

Argentinian, Brazilian, Spanish and Mexican bonus track
No.	Title	Writer(s)	Album	Length
19.	"Una Noche" (featuring Alejandro Sanz)	The Corrs; Alejandro Sanz	In Blue (Latin American edition)	5:17

2023 expanded edition
No.	Title	Writer(s)	Album	Length
19.	"Little Lies"	Christine McVie, Eddy Quintela	Previously unreleased, 2023	3:42
20.	"Everywhere"	Christine McVie	Previously unreleased, 2023	3:33
21.	"Songbird"	Christine McVie	Previously unreleased, 2023	3:23

== Charts ==
=== Weekly charts ===
Chart (2001)	Peak position
Australian Albums (ARIA)	2
Austrian Albums (Ö3 Austria)	7
Belgian Albums (Ultratop Flanders)	5
Belgian Albums (Ultratop Wallonia)	8
Danish Albums (Hitlisten)	24
Dutch Albums (Album Top 100)	6
European Albums (Billboard)	9
Finnish Albums (Suomen virallinen lista)	26
German Albums (Offizielle Top 100)	12
Irish Albums (IRMA)	1
Italian Albums (FIMI)	14
Japanese Albums (Oricon)	4
Malaysian Albums (RIM)	3
New Zealand Albums (RMNZ)	2
Norwegian Albums (VG-lista)	29
Polish Albums (ZPAV)	23
Scottish Albums (Official Charts)	3
Spanish Albums (Promúsicae)	2
Swedish Albums (Sverigetopplistan)	34
Swiss Albums (Schweizer Hitparade)	6
UK Albums (Official Charts)	6

Chart (2023)	Peak position
Hungarian Physical Albums (MAHASZ)	18

=== Year-end charts ===
Chart (2001)	Peak position
Australian Albums (ARIA)	18
Austrian Albums (Ö3 Austria)	70
Belgian Albums (Ultratop Flanders)	65
Belgian Albums (Ultratop Wallonia)	95
Dutch Albums (Album Top 100)	45
Italian Album (FIMI)	87
New Zealand Albums (RMNZ)	50
Swiss Albums (Hitparade)	56
UK Albums (OCC)	43
Worldwide Albums (IFPI)	37

== Certifications ==
Region	Certification	Certified units/sales
Argentina (CAPIF)	Gold	20,000^{^}
Australia (ARIA)	4× Platinum	280,000^{^}
Belgium (BRMA)	Gold	25,000^{*}
Brazil (Pro-Música Brasil)	Gold	50,000^{*}
Canada (Music Canada)	Gold	50,000^{^}
Denmark (IFPI Danmark)	Gold	25,000^{^}
France (SNEP)	Platinum	300,000^{*}
Germany (BVMI)	Gold	150,000^{^}
Ireland (IRMA)	5× Platinum	75,000^{^}
Mexico (AMPROFON)	Gold	75,000^{^}
Netherlands (NVPI)	Platinum	80,000^{^}
New Zealand (RMNZ)	2× Platinum	30,000^{^}
Spain (Promusicae)	Platinum	100,000^{^}
Switzerland (IFPI Switzerland)	Platinum	40,000^{^}
United Kingdom (BPI)	2× Platinum	600,000^{^}
Summaries
Europe (IFPI)	Platinum	1,000,000^{*}
^{*} Sales figures based on certification alone.^{^} Shipments figures based on certification alone.
