= Irresistible (The Corrs song) =

2000 song by the Corrs

Single by the Corrs

from the album In Blue
- B-side: "At Your Side" (live acoustic); "Somebody for Someone" (live acoustic)
- Released: September 2000
- Studio: Switzerland; Dublin, Ireland
- Genre: Pop
- Length: 3:40
- Label: 143; Atlantic; Lava
- Songwriters: Andrea Corr; Caroline Corr; Jim Corr; Sharon Corr; Robert John "Mutt" Lange
- Producer: Robert John "Mutt" Lange

The Corrs singles chronology
"Breathless" (2000)	"Irresistible" (2000)	"Give Me a Reason" (2001)

"Irresistible" is a song by Irish pop rock group the Corrs. It was released in September 2000 as the second single taken from their third studio album In Blue (2000). The song was written by the Corrs and co-written and produced by Robert John "Mutt" Lange. "Irresistible" is a pop song with lyrics about desiring lifelong love. It received mixed reviews from music critics; some called it a pop hit, while others deemed it weak. The song was a moderate success, reaching number eight in New Zealand, number 20 in the United Kingdom, and the top 40 in several other countries, including Australia, France, and Ireland.

== Background ==
"Irresistible" was released as the second single from "In Blue" (2000) in September 2000. The 7-inch single included the song and a "Live Acoustic" version of "At Your Side," while the CD-Maxi included both songs and a "Live Acoustic" version of "Somebody for Someone." Similar with the lead single "Breathless", "Irresistible" was also written by the Corrs (Andrea, Caroline, Sharon and Jim) and Robert "Mutt" Lange, who also produced the song.

== Reception ==
=== Critical response ===
The song received mixed reviews from music critics. David Beamish of DVDactive called the song, "An obvious candidate for a single as with the rest of the album." Jake C. Taylor of Sputnikmusic named it a "poppy hit." Jane Stevenson of Canadian website Jam! considered "Irresistible," "one of the album's weaker songs." Chris Charles of BBC News wrote the song "looks like the Ivor Novello's on hold for another year, then."

=== Commercial performance ===
"Irresistible" peaked within the top 20 in several countries. In the UK, the song reached number 20 on the UK Singles Chart, becoming their seventh top 20 single there. On the Irish Singles Chart, the song debuted and peaked at number 30. In France, the song reached the top 40, peaking at number 39, on 17 February 2001.

In New Zealand, the song entered the top 10. It debuted at number 44 on the RIANZ Singles Chart on 26 November 2000 but fell out the following week. It re-entered at number 50, on 10 December 2000, and peaked at number eight on 28 January 2001. In Australia, the song debuted at number 39 on the ARIA Singles Chart on 11 November 2000. On 17 December 2000, the song jumped to number 28. It then left the charts from number 50 on 14 January 2001 but re-entered at number 27 on 28 January 2001, becoming its peak position.

== Track listings ==
Standard CD and cassette single

1. "Irresistible" (album version) – 3:40
2. "At Your Side" (live acoustic) – 3:48
3. "Somebody for Someone" (live acoustic) – 3:24

European CD single

1. "Irresistible" (album version)
2. "At Your Side" (live acoustic)

== Personnel ==
Personnel are adapted from the UK CD single liner notes.

- Andrea Corr – lead vocals, tin whistle
- Caroline Corr – vocals, drums, bodhrán, percussion
- Sharon Corr – vocals, violin
- Jim Corr – vocals, guitar, keyboards
- Anthony Drennan – guitars, lead guitar
- Keith Duffy – bass guitar

== Charts ==
=== Weekly charts ===
Chart (2000–2001)	Peak position
Australia (ARIA)	27
Belgium (Ultratip Bubbling Under Flanders)	3
Belgium (Ultratip Bubbling Under Wallonia)	6
Europe (Eurochart Hot 100)	67
France (SNEP)	39
Germany (GfK)	68
Ireland (IRMA)	30
Italy (FIMI)	38
Netherlands (Dutch Top 40 Tipparade)	5
Netherlands (Single Top 100)	79
New Zealand (Recorded Music NZ)	8
Poland Airplay (Music & Media)	11
Romania (Romanian Top 100)	4
Scottish Singles Sales (Official Charts)	14
Spain (AFYVE)	14
Sweden (Sverigetopplistan)	37
Switzerland (Schweizer Hitparade)	47
UK Singles (Official Charts)	20

=== Year-end charts ===
Chart (2000)	Position
Romania (Romanian Top 100)	58

== Release history ==
Region	Date	Format(s)	Label(s)	Ref.
Ireland	September 2000	—N/a	143; Atlantic; Lava	
United Kingdom	October 30, 2000	CD; cassette	143; Atlantic; Lava	
