= In Blue =

2000 studio album by the Corrs

- International standard edition cover. The U.S. cover uses the same image as the special edition.

Studio album by the Corrs
- Released: 17 July 2000
- Studios: Westland Studios (Dublin, Ireland); Windmill Lane Studios (Dublin); Sully Sound (Vaud, Switzerland)
- Genres: Pop rock; Celtic fusion
- Length: 58:55
- Labels: Atlantic; 143
- Producers: The Corrs; Robert John "Mutt" Lange; Anthony Drennan; Mitchell Froom; Billy Farrell; Tim Martin; John Hughes

The Corrs chronology
The Corrs Unplugged (1999)	In Blue (2000)	Best of The Corrs (2001)

Singles from In Blue
- 1. "Breathless" Released: June 2000; 2. "Irresistible" Released: September 2000; 3. "Give Me a Reason" Released: February 2001; 4. "All the Love in the World" Released: 11 June 2001

Alternate cover
- Special edition

Professional ratings
Review scores
Source	Rating
AllMusic	3/5 stars
entertainment.ie	2/5 stars
Entertainment Weekly	C−
MTV Asia	8/10
NME	5/10

In Blue is the third studio album by Irish pop rock band the Corrs, released in 2000 which saw the band become known in the United States. The title of the album comes from a lyric in the song "Give Me a Reason". As well as the UK number one single "Breathless", the album also contains new versions of "Radio" and "At Your Side", which had appeared on their previous album The Corrs Unplugged. Mutt Lange co-wrote and produced three songs from the album.

Several of the tracks were used in various television programmes and films: "Rebel Heart" as the theme for the TV miniseries of the same name; "One Night" in Mad About Mambo; "At Your Side" in Say It Isn't So and the trailer for the film The Holiday; and "All the Love in the World" in the film America's Sweethearts. At the 43rd Annual Grammy Awards, "Breathless" was nominated for Best Pop Performance by a Duo or Group with Vocals, while "Rebel Heart" was nominated for Best Pop Instrumental Performance.

== Track listing ==
All tracks are written by the Corrs, with additional writing by Robert John "Mutt" Lange on tracks 1, 5 and 7.

No.	Title	Producer(s)	Length
1.	"Breathless"	Robert John "Mutt" Lange	3:28
2.	"Give Me a Reason"	Andrea Corr; Sharon Corr; Caroline Corr; Jim Corr	3:29
3.	"Somebody for Someone"	The Corrs; DFHM; Mitchell Froom (add.)	4:00
4.	"Say"	The Corrs; Froom	4:33
5.	"All the Love in the World"	Lange	4:22
6.	"Radio"	The Corrs; DFHM; Froom (add.)	4:14
7.	"Irresistible"	Lange	3:40
8.	"One Night"	The Corrs; DFHM; Froom (add.)	4:38
9.	"All in a Day"	The Corrs	3:43
10.	"At Your Side"	The Corrs; Froom	3:55
11.	"No More Cry"	The Corrs; DFHM; Froom (add.)	2:59
12.	"Rain"	The Corrs; DFHM; Froom (add.)	4:15
13.	"Give It All Up"	The Corrs; Froom (add.)	3:28
14.	"Hurt Before"	The Corrs; Froom	4:05
15.	"Rebel Heart" (instrumental)	The Corrs; Billy Farrell; John Hughes; Froom (add.)	4:06

Latin American bonus tracks
No.	Title	Writer(s)	Producer(s)	Length
16.	"Una Noche" (featuring Alejandro Sanz)	The Corrs; Alejandro Sanz	The Corrs; DFHM; Froom (add.)	4:30
17.	"Judy"	The Corrs	The Corrs; DFHM	2:40

Special edition / Australian bonus track
No.	Title	Writer(s)	Producer(s)	Length
16.	"Judy"	The Corrs	The Corrs; DFHM	2:40

=== Special edition ===
Disc two
No.	Title	Writer(s)	Length
1.	"Somebody for Someone" (acoustic version)	The Corrs	3:24
2.	"No More Cry" (acoustic version)	The Corrs	2:53
3.	"Radio" (acoustic version)	The Corrs	4:14
4.	"At Your Side" (acoustic version)	The Corrs	3:50
5.	"Love in the Milky Way"	The Corrs; Oliver Leiber; John Shanks	4:01
6.	"Looking in the Eyes of Love"	Kostas; Tricia Walker	4:32
7.	"Haste to the Wedding" (live instrumental)	Traditional	5:00
8.	"So Young" (live (bonus track on some issues))	The Corrs	7:34

== Personnel ==
=== The band ===
- Andrea Corr – lead vocals, tin whistle
- Caroline Corr – drums, bodhran, piano, vocals
- Jim Corr – guitar, keyboards, piano, vocals
- Sharon Corr – violin, vocals

=== Featuring ===
- Anthony Drennan – guitars, lead guitar
- Keith Duffy – bass guitar

=== Guest musicians ===
- Ronan Dooney – trumpet
- Paul Duffy – saxophone
- Mitchell Froom – keyboards
- Billy Farrell – keyboards
- Fiachra Trench – string arrangement

=== Production ===
- Producers: The Corrs, Robert John "Mutt" Lange, DFHM (Mitchell Froom, Billy Farrell, Tim Martin, John Hughes)
- Engineer: Tim Martin
- Assistant engineer: Frances Murphy
- Mixing: Adam Olmsted, Mike Shipley
- Pre-programming: Richard Meyer (aka Swayd)
- Programming: Richard Meyer (aka Swayd), Cory Churko, Oisin Murry
- String arrangements: Fiachra Trench
- Production consultant: Mitchell Froom
- Art direction: Elizabeth Barrett
- Design: Andrea Brooks
- Photography: Rankin, Norman Jean Roy

== Charts ==
=== Weekly charts ===
Chart (2000)	Peak position
Australian Albums (ARIA)	1
Austrian Albums (Ö3 Austria)	1
Belgian Albums (Ultratop Flanders)	2
Belgian Albums (Ultratop Wallonia)	1
Canadian Albums (RPM)	5
Czech Albums (ČNS IFPI)	4
Danish Albums (Tracklisten)	2
Dutch Albums (Album Top 100)	2
European Albums (Billboard)	1
Finnish Albums (Suomen virallinen lista)	2
French Albums (SNEP)	2
German Albums (Offizielle Top 100)	1
Hungarian Albums (MAHASZ)	10
Irish Albums (IRMA)	1
Italian Albums (FIMI)	2
Japanese Albums (Oricon)	11
Malaysian Albums (RIM)	1
New Zealand Albums (RMNZ)	2
Norwegian Albums (VG-lista)	1
Polish Albums (ZPAV)	20
Spanish Albums (Promusicae)	1
Swedish Albums (Sverigetopplistan)	1
Swiss Albums (Schweizer Hitparade)	1
UK Albums (Official Charts)	1
US Billboard 200	21

=== Year-end charts ===
Chart (2000)	Position
Australian Albums (ARIA)	11
Austrian Albums (Ö3 Austria)	6
Belgian Albums (Ultratop Flanders)	12
Belgian Albums (Ultratop Wallonia)	9
Canadian Albums (Nielsen SoundScan)	105
Dutch Albums (Album Top 100)	12
European Albums (Music & Media)	5
Finnish Albums (Suomen virallinen lista)	129
French Albums (SNEP)	22
German Albums (Offizielle Top 100)	4
New Zealand Albums (RMNZ)	15
Spanish Albums (AFYPE)	13
Swiss Albums (Schweizer Hitparade)	7
UK Albums (OCC)	16
US Billboard 200	119

Chart (2001)	Position
Belgian Albums (Ultratop Flanders)	99
Belgian Albums (Ultratop Wallonia)	69
UK Albums (OCC)	102

=== Decade-end chart ===
Chart (2000–2009)	Position
Australian Albums (ARIA)	85

== Certifications ==
Region	Certification	Certified units/sales
Australia (ARIA)	4× Platinum	280,000^{^}
Austria (IFPI Austria)	2× Platinum	100,000^{*}
Belgium (BRMA)	Platinum	50,000^{*}
Canada (Music Canada)	Platinum	100,000^{^}
Denmark (IFPI Danmark)	2× Platinum	
Finland	—	16,872
France (SNEP)	Platinum	300,000^{*}
Germany (BVMI)	3× Gold	450,000^{^}
Hong Kong (IFPI Hong Kong)	Gold	
Indonesia	Platinum	
Ireland (IRMA)	6× Platinum	90,000^{^}
Italy (FIMI)	2× Platinum	200,000^{*}
Japan (RIAJ)	Gold	100,000^{^}
Malaysia	Platinum	
Mexico (AMPROFON)	Gold	75,000^{^}
Netherlands (NVPI)	Platinum	80,000^{^}
New Zealand (RMNZ)	4× Platinum	60,000^{^}
Norway (IFPI Norway)	Platinum	50,000^{*}
Philippines (PARI)	Gold	20,000^{*}
Portugal (AFP)	Gold	20,000^{^}
Singapore (RIAS)	2× Platinum	30,000^{*}
Spain (Promusicae)	3× Platinum	300,000^{^}
Sweden (GLF)	Platinum	80,000^{^}
Switzerland (IFPI Switzerland)	Platinum	50,000^{^}
Taiwan (RIT)	Gold	25,000^{*}
Thailand	Gold	
United Kingdom (BPI)	3× Platinum	900,000^{^}
United States (RIAA)	Platinum	1,000,000^{^}
Summaries
Europe (IFPI)	3× Platinum	3,000,000^{*}
^{*} Sales figures based on certification alone.^{^} Shipments figures based on certification alone.

== Release history ==
Region	Date	Format
Australia	10 July 2000	CD
United Kingdom	17 July 2000	CD, cassette
United Kingdom	20 November 2000	special edition CD and cassette
United Kingdom	26 August 2002	DVD audio
Argentina	1 June 2001	CD
Germany / Ireland	17 November 2000	special edition CD
Japan	12 July 2000	CD
