= Radio (The Corrs song) =

1999 single by the Corrs

Single by the Corrs

from the album Unplugged
- B-side: "Dreams" (unplugged)
- Released: October 1999
- Recorded: 5 October 1999
- Venue: Ardmore Studios (Bray, County Wicklow, Ireland)
- Length: 4:15
- Label: 143; Atlantic; Lava
- Songwriter: Sharon Corr
- Producers: The Corrs; Mitchell Froom

The Corrs singles chronology
"Lifting Me" (1999)	"Radio" (1999)	"Breathless" (2000)

"Radio" is a song by Irish folk rock band the Corrs. It was released in October 1999 from the band's live album The Corrs Unplugged, recorded on 5 October 1999 during their appearance on MTV Unplugged, with "Dreams" from the same album as a B-side.

The song was originally slated for their previous album Talk on Corners but was shelved after failing to develop a suitable arrangement at the time. An "electric" version appeared on their next studio album In Blue. The single became a chart hit, reaching the top 20 in Ireland, New Zealand, and the United Kingdom. The song was also a modest adult contemporary hit in Canada, reaching number 64 on the RPM Adult Contemporary chart.

== Background ==
According to Sharon Corr, the Unplugged and In Blue versions of the song were the third and fourth versions respectively to be recorded. The Unplugged version was modeled after the first acoustic demo they had recorded, while the In Blue version was a remake of the second early "dance" version. Caroline Corr stated that after she felt there was little to experiment with on the Unplugged version, the band's programmer suggested adding synthesizers and experimenting with different electric guitar licks for the In Blue version. The Corrs recorded the entire Unplugged album on 5 October 1999 at Ardmore Studios in Bray, Ireland.

== Music video ==
The video for "Radio" is pieced together from the "Unplugged" session at the MTV studios.

== Track listings ==
UK CD and cassette single; European and Australasian CD single

1. "Radio" (edit) – 4:15
2. "Dreams" (unplugged) – 3:43
3. "Radio" (album version) – 5:00

UK 7-inch single

A. "Radio" (edit) – 4:15
B. "Dreams" (unplugged) – 3:43

== Personnel ==
Personnel are lifted from the UK CD single liner notes.

The Corrs

- Andrea Corr – lead vocals, tin whistle
- Caroline Corr – drums, piano, bodhrán, vocals
- Sharon Corr – violin, vocals
- Jim Corr – guitar, piano, vocals

Additional musicians

- Anthony Drennan – guitar, Dobro
- Keith Duffy – bass, guitar, percussion
- The Irish Film Orchestra – additional instrumentation

Production

- Fiachra Trench – orchestral arrangement
- Bob Clearmountain – mixing
- Bob Ludwig – mastering
- Elizabeth Barrett – art direction
- Andrea Brooks – artwork design
- Kevin Westenberg – artwork photography

== Charts ==
=== Weekly charts ===
Weekly chart performance
Chart (1999–2000)	Peak position
Australia (ARIA)	120
Canada Adult Contemporary (RPM)	64
Europe (Eurochart Hot 100)	65
European Radio Top 50 (Music & Media)	12
Germany (GfK)	64
Ireland (IRMA)	20
Netherlands (Dutch Top 40)	24
Netherlands (Single Top 100)	57
New Zealand (Recorded Music NZ)	19
Scottish Singles Sales (Official Charts)	16
Spain (AFYVE)	1
Switzerland (Schweizer Hitparade)	52
UK Airplay (Music & Media)	6
UK Singles (Official Charts)	18

=== Year-end charts ===
Annual chart rankings
Chart (2000)	Rank
European Radio Top 50 (Music & Media)	95

== Release history ==
Release dates and formats
Region	Date	Format(s)	Label(s)	Ref.
Ireland	October 1999	—N/a	143; Atlantic; Lava	
United Kingdom	29 November 1999	CD; cassette	143; Atlantic; Lava	
New Zealand	13 December 1999	CD	143; Atlantic; Lava	
