= Breathless (The Corrs song) =

2000 single by the Corrs

Single by the Corrs

from the album In Blue
- B-side: "Head in the Air"; "Judy"
- Released: June 2000
- Studio: Sully (Vaud, Switzerland)
- Genre: Pop
- Length: 3:27
- Label: 143; Atlantic; Lava
- Songwriters: The Corrs; R.J. Lange
- Producer: Robert John "Mutt" Lange

The Corrs singles chronology
"Radio" (1999)	"Breathless" (2000)	"Irresistible" (2000)

Music video
- "Breathless" on YouTube

"Breathless" is a song by Irish pop rock family group the Corrs. It was released in June 2000 as the first single from their third studio album, In Blue (2000). "Breathless" was co-written and produced by famed music producer Robert John "Mutt" Lange, who produced for Shania Twain, Bryan Adams and Def Leppard, among others. "Breathless" is a pop song with lyrics about seduction.

"Breathless" reached number one in the Czech Republic, Finland, Poland and the United Kingdom—their only British chart-topper as of 2026. It was the 33rd-highest-selling single in the United Kingdom in 2000. It also reached the top five in Ireland, Italy, New Zealand, Spain and Sweden, as well as number seven in Australia. In the United States, it peaked at number 34 in March 2001, giving the Corrs their only US top-40 hit. In 2001, the song was nominated for the Grammy Award for Best Pop Performance by a Duo or Group with Vocals.

A music video was filmed in the Mojave Desert at the Trona Airport (TRH) in Inyo County, California, on 24 May 2000 and was directed by Nigel Dick.

== Background and release ==
"Breathless", a pop song, was written by the Corrs (Andrea, Caroline, Sharon and Jim) and Robert "Mutt" Lange, who also produced the track. The song was released as In Blue's first single in June 2000. The CD single includes "Breathless" and two new tracks: "Head in the Air" and "Judy". In the United Kingdom, a CD and cassette single were distributed on 3 July 2000.

Speaking of working with Lange, Andrea said: "We happened to meet up [with Lange], and we both liked what each other does, so we decided to try and write a song together. So we did, and the first song we wrote together was 'Breathless.' It was a beautiful, sunny day when we wrote it," she continued, "and I think that's very much in the song, because it's kind of high impact and driven and sunny and summery and it's a love song. It's about seduction and how when you're falling in love, you're just enticing that person to go one step further. It's good, good fun."

An acoustic version was made for their 2002 live album, VH1 Presents: The Corrs, Live in Dublin. The song was also included on their two compilation albums, Best of The Corrs and Dreams: The Ultimate Corrs Collection.

== Reception ==
=== Critical response ===
Critics were divided over "Breathless". Steven McDonald of AllMusic picked the song as one of the best tracks on the album. Mel Roberts of Amazon.co.uk called it a "stand-out" track on the album. For Chris Charles of BBC News, the song "chugs along at Blondie pace before petering out into a wailing imitation of Dolores O'Riordan." For Entertainment.ie, Andrew Lynch offered a mixed review, calling the song "half-decent" but "ruined by the MOR production."

Jane Stevenson of Canadian website Jam! considered "Breathless" "one of the album's weaker songs". Steven Wells of NME praised Andrea Corr's "fantastic yodel-type" singing. Carolyn E. Davis of People magazine called the song "saccharine", while Jake C. Taylor of Sputnikmusic named it a "poppy hit". "Breathless" was nominated for the 2001 Grammy Award for Best Pop Performance by a Duo or Group with Vocals but lost to Steely Dan's "Cousin Dupree".

=== Commercial performance ===
The song topped the charts in four countries while peaking inside the top 10 in several other countries. In the United Kingdom, the song topped the UK Singles Chart, becoming the Corrs' only number-one single there and their best charting-single since "Runaway", which peaked at number two in 1999. On the Irish Singles Chart, the song debuted and peaked at number three, making it the band's highest charting single in Ireland. In Italy, the single debuted at number five on 13 July 2000 and peaking at number two four weeks later. After four weeks, the single climbed again to number two, on 14 September 2000.

In Australia, the song debuted at number 48 on the ARIA Singles Chart on 2 July 2000. On 6 August 2000, the song climbed to number 20. Two weeks later, the song peaked at number seven, remaining at its the peak position for two more weeks. The single spent 20 weeks on the ARIA charts and was certified platinum by the Australian Recording Industry Association (ARIA), denoting shipments of 70,000 copies. In New Zealand, the song debuted at number 32 on the RIANZ Singles Chart the week of 23 July 2000. It peaked at number three on 20 August 2000, staying at that position for two non-consecutive weeks. In the United States, the song reached number 34 on the Billboard Hot 100 chart, proving to be their only single to reach the to 40. It also appeared on the Adult Contemporary and Adult Top 40 charts, peaking at number seven on the latter.

== Music video ==
=== Background ===
The music video for the song (directed by Nigel Dick) was filmed in the Mojave Desert, California, and at Trona Airport (TRH) in Inyo County on 24 May 2000. Two days of on-location filming were required. Both Andrea and Sharon suffered from heat exhaustion during the two-day shoot and were hospitalized, although they recovered the following day. "We shot the video in the Mojave Desert, just outside Los Angeles," Jim described, "and it was shot by a friend of ours, Nigel Dick. We've worked with him on quite a number of videos. We spent about two days out in the desert sun, and we kind of weren't really prepared for that type of heat."

=== Synopsis ===
The video shows the Corrs at a small airstrip performing impromptu inside a hangar in the middle of the desert. They arrive in a Douglas DC-3 airplane (the registration N26MA is clearly visible on the side) and perform the song for an audience of bikers before the final shot shows the DC-3 leaving. There are two cuts of the video. One version was more story-oriented, and shows the Corrs setting up the stage for their show with bikers arriving to see them perform. The second version focused more on a young man, apparently a worker at the airstrip, and his reaction to The Corr sisters as they sing. Both versions were released on their Best of DVD.

== Track listings ==
Standard CD and cassette single

1. "Breathless" (album version) – 3:27
2. "Head in the Air" – 3:43
3. "Judy" – 2:26

European CD single

1. "Breathless" (album version) – 3:27
2. "Head in the Air" – 3:43

== Credits and personnel ==
Credits are adapted from the CD single liner notes.

Studios

- Recorded at Sully Studio (Vaud, Switzerland)
- Mixed at the Record Plant (Los Angeles, California, US)
- Mastered at Gateway Mastering (Portland, Maine, US)

The Corrs

- The Corrs – writing
- Andrea Corr – lead vocals, tin whistle
- Caroline Corr – vocals, drums, bodhrán, percussion
- Sharon Corr – vocals, violin
- Jim Corr – vocals, guitar, keyboards

Additional musicians

- Anthony Drennan – lead guitar, guitars
- Keith Duffy – bass guitar

Writing and production

- Robert John "Mutt" Lange – writing (as R.J. Lange), production
- Mike Shipley – mixing
- Bob Ludwig – mastering
- John Hughes – management
- Elizabeth Barrett – art direction
- Andrea Brooks – art design
- Rankin – photography

== Charts ==
=== Weekly charts ===
Weekly chart performance for "Breatheless"
Chart (2000–2001)	Peak position
Australia (ARIA)	7
Austria (Ö3 Austria Top 40)	10
Belgium (Ultratop 50 Flanders)	17
Belgium (Ultratop 50 Wallonia)	22
Canada Adult Contemporary (RPM)	4 (Note: "Breathless" reached number 4 when RPM ceased publication in November 2000.)
Czech Republic (IFPI)	1
Europe (Eurochart Hot 100)	6
Finland Airplay (Suomen virallinen radiosoittolista)	1
France (SNEP)	26
Germany (GfK)	19
Ireland (IRMA)	3
Italy (FIMI)	2
Netherlands (Dutch Top 40)	21
Netherlands (Single Top 100)	17
New Zealand (Recorded Music NZ)	3
Poland Airplay (Music & Media)	1
Portugal (AFP)	3
Romania (Romanian Top 100)	2
Scottish Singles Sales (Official Charts)	1
Spain (Promusicae)	5
Sweden (Sverigetopplistan)	5
Switzerland (Schweizer Hitparade)	15
UK Singles (Official Charts)	1
US Billboard Hot 100	34
US Adult Contemporary (Billboard)	14
US Adult Pop Airplay (Billboard)	7
US Pop Airplay (Billboard)	22
US Top 40 Tracks (Billboard)	20

=== Year-end charts ===
2000 year-end chart performance for "Breathless"
Chart (2000)	Position
Australia (ARIA)	46
Belgium (Ultratop 50 Flanders)	57
Belgium (Ultratop 50 Wallonia)	72
Brazil (Crowley)	91
Europe (Eurochart Hot 100)	45
France (SNEP)	81
Ireland (IRMA)	18
Italy (Musica e dischi)	17
Netherlands (Dutch Top 40)	98
Netherlands (Single Top 100)	81
New Zealand (RIANZ)	7
Romania (Romanian Top 100)	6
Sweden (Hitlistan)	69
Switzerland (Schweizer Hitparade)	89
UK Singles (OCC)	33
US Adult Top 40 (Billboard)	67

2001 year-end chart performance for "Breathless"
Chart (2001)	Position
Canada Radio (Nielsen BDS)	57
US Adult Contemporary (Billboard)	22
US Adult Top 40 (Billboard)	18
US Mainstream Top 40 (Billboard)	91

== Certifications ==
Certifications for "Breathless"
Region	Certification	Certified units/sales
Australia (ARIA)	2× Platinum	140,000^{‡}
Italy (FIMI)	Gold	25,000^{*}
New Zealand (RMNZ)	Platinum	30,000^{‡}
Sweden (GLF)	Gold	15,000^{^}
United Kingdom (BPI)	Platinum	600,000^{‡}
^{*} Sales figures based on certification alone.^{^} Shipments figures based on certification alone.^{‡} Sales+streaming figures based on certification alone.

== Release history ==
Release dates and formats for "Breathless"
Region	Date	Format(s)	Label(s)	Ref(s).
Ireland	June 2000	—N/a	143; Atlantic; Lava	
United Kingdom	3 July 2000	CD; cassette	143; Atlantic; Lava	
Japan	12 July 2000	CD	EastWest Japan; 143; Atlantic; Lava	
United States	7 August 2000	Adult contemporary; hot adult contemporary; modern adult contemporary radio	143; Atlantic; Lava	
United States	8 August 2000	Contemporary hit radio	143; Atlantic; Lava	
