= The Same Sun =

Studio album by Sharon Corr
- Released: 16 September 2013
- Genre: Pop; rock
- Length: 38:04
- Label: BobbyJean
- Producer: Mitchell Froom

Sharon Corr chronology
Dream of You (2010)	The Same Sun (2013)

Singles from The Same Sun
- 1. "Take a Minute" Released: 12 November 2013; 2. "We Could Be Lovers" Released: 14 February 2014

The Same Sun is the second studio album by Irish singer-songwriter Sharon Corr and was released on 16 September 2013.

== Background ==
Corr revealed in an interview with Nick Milligan in January 2012 that she was piecing together her second solo record. "We're going to record it in May and hopefully have it out in September/October." Sharon is taking a new approach with the writing of this record, "Mostly my whole life I've written on my own. Some of the songs I wrote for The Corrs, like "So Young" and "Radio", I wrote myself. So for the new album I've been writing with other people and that's been brilliant. It's brought other angles to my music that perhaps wouldn't have been there."

Corr finished writing the album in March 2012 and she said it may be called Catch the Moon. The title comes from the idea "of when somebody comes into your life and they utterly change yours, that you would go to any lengths for them... so you would catch the moon." However, on 21 August 2013, it was announced that the album would be titled The Same Sun.

The Same Sun was first released in Indonesia, Argentina, Brazil, Chile and the Philippines on 16 September 2013, with selected countries following later.

== Track listing ==
All tracks are written by Sharon Corr, additional songwriters are noted below

No.	Title	Writer(s)	Length
1.	"Raindrops"		3:45
2.	"Take a Minute"	Mitchell Froom	2:59
3.	"We Could Be Lovers"	Don Mescall	3:19
4.	"Upon an Ocean"	Froom	2:56
5.	"Edge of Nowhere"	Mescall	3:25
6.	"Full Circle"	Mescall	3:31
7.	"You Say"	Mescall; Andy Hill	3:58
8.	"Thinking About You"		3:43
9.	"The Runaround"	Mescall	3:06
10.	"The Same Sun"	Mescall; Froom	3:49
11.	"Christmas Night"	Mescall	3:27

iTunes Deluxe edition
No.	Title	Writer(s)	Length
12.	"Salamanca"		4:01
13.	"Take a Minute" (Music video)	Froom	2:55
14.	"We Could Be Lovers" (Music video)	Mescall	3:09

== Critical reception ==
Professional ratings
Review scores
Source	Rating
Mojo	3/4 stars
Entertainment Focus	4/5 stars
The Yorkshire Times	3/5 stars
Hot Press	3.5/5 stars

The Same Sun has obtained generally positive reviews from critics. According to Mojo (magazine), Corr has "unleashed a deep, husky voice to deliver '60s influenced about adult vulnerability, remorse and temptation." Graham Clark from The Yorkshire Times gave the album a 3 over 5, stating that her style is "not that far removed from Carole King, Gloria Estefan and Karen Carpenter, in fact you could imagine any of these artists singing these songs." Pip Ellwood from Entertainment Focus, who gave the album 4 stars out of 5, commented that "The Same Sun is a gorgeous collection of songs from one of the most talented female artists in the industry."

== Release history ==
Region	Date	Label	Format
Argentina, Chile, Indonesia, Philippines	16 September 2013	Selecta	Digital download
Brazil	16 September 2013	Selecta	CD, digital download
Belgium, Netherlands	6 November 2013	Warner Music	CD, digital download
Austria, Germany, Switzerland	26 November 2013	Warner Music	CD, digital download
Portugal, Spain	26 November 2013	Parlophone	CD, digital download
New Zealand	14 February 2014	Warner Music	CD, digital download
Canada	11 March 2014	Justin Time	CD, digital download
France	5 May 2014	Verycords	CD, digital download
Australia	23 May 2014	Warner Music	CD, digital download
Ireland, United Kingdom	7 September 2014	Absolute Marketing & Distribution	CD, digital download
