= Road to Eden =

Road to Eden may refer to:

- "Road to Eden", song by The Corrs on the 2017 album Jupiter Calling
- Road to Eden (album), 2022 album by Dare
