= Trona Airport =

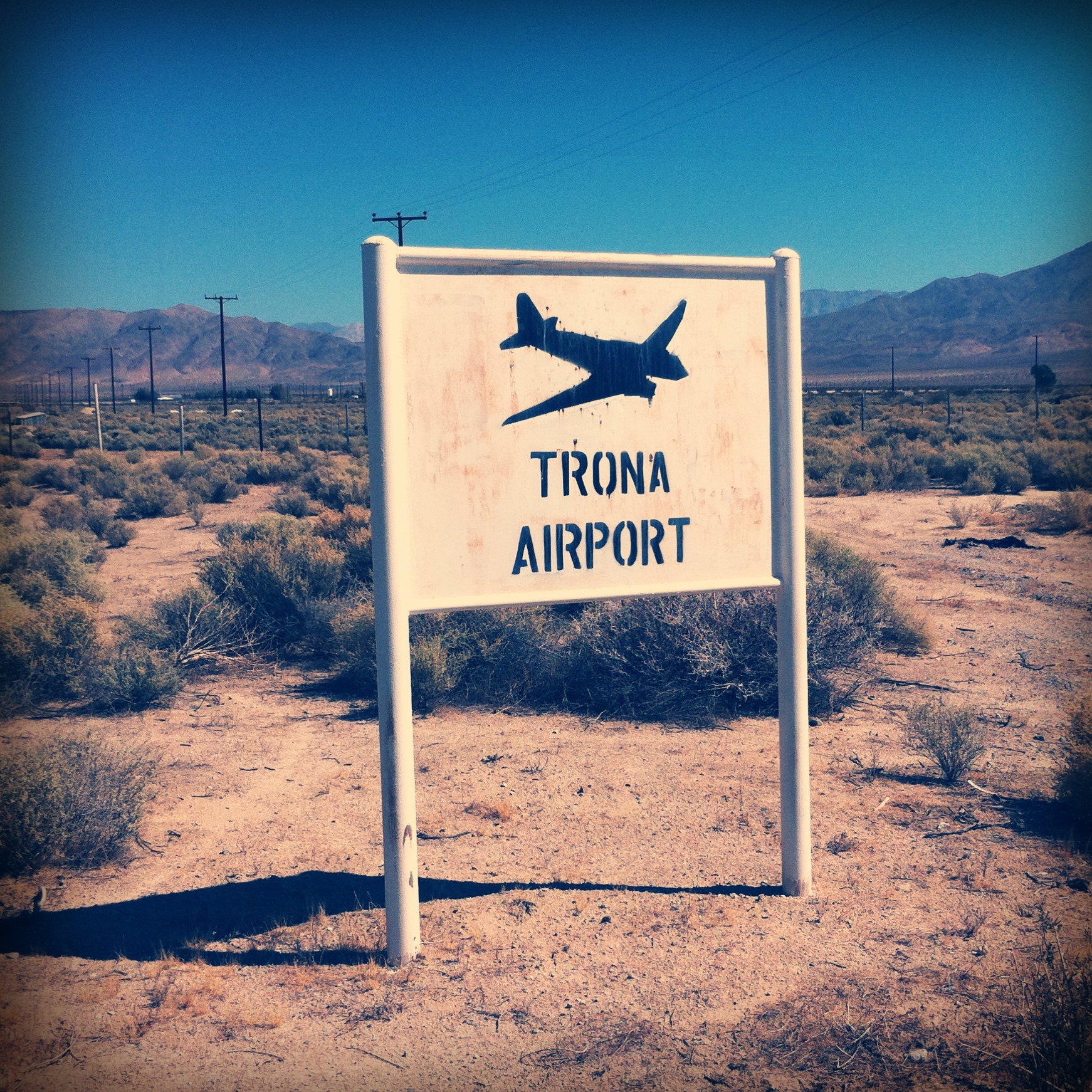
- IATA: TRH; ICAO: none; FAA LID: L72

Summary
- Airport type: Public
- Owner: US Department of the Interior, Bureau of Land Management
- Serves: Trona, California
- Elevation AMSL: 1,718 ft (524 m)
- Coordinates: 35°48′46″N 117°19′37″W

Map
- Location within California

Runways
Direction	Length		Surface
Direction	ft	m	Surface
17/35	5,910	1,801	Asphalt

Helipads
Number	Length		Surface
Number	ft	m	Surface
H1	52	16	Asphalt

Statistics (2012)
- Aircraft operations: 7,000
- Based aircraft: 2
- Source: Federal Aviation Administration

Trona Airport (IATA: TRH, FAA LID: L72) is a public airport five miles north of Trona, in Inyo County, California. It is owned by the United States Department of the Interior, Bureau of Land Management. The National Plan of Integrated Airport Systems for 2011–2015 categorized it as a general aviation facility.

Most U.S. airports use the same three-letter location identifier for the FAA and IATA, but this airport is L72 to the FAA and has IATA code TRH.

== History ==
During World War II it was an outlying airstrip supporting the U.S. Marine Corps Auxiliary Air Station Mojave located near Mojave, California.

In 1976-78 Golden West Airlines scheduled de Havilland Canada DHC-6 Twin Otters direct to Los Angeles (LAX).

The musical group The Corrs shot the music video for their song "Breathless" at Trona Airport on May 17–19, 2000, which hit #7 on Billboard charts in 2000.

== Facilities ==
Trona Airport covers 150 acres (61 ha) at an elevation of 1,718 feet (524 m). Its one runway, 17/35, is 5,910 by 60 feet (1,801 x 18 m). It has one helipad, H1, 52 by 52 feet (16 x 16 m).

In the year ending April 9, 2012 the airport had 7,000 general aviation aircraft operations, average 19 per day. Two ultralight aircraft were then based at this airport.
