= Rebel Heart (instrumental) =

2000 song by The Corrs

Instrumental by The Corrs

from the album In Blue
- Released: 13 July 2000
- Genre: Celtic, folk rock, alternative rock
- Length: 4:06
- Label: WEA International
- Songwriter: Sharon Corr
- Producer: The Corrs

"Rebel Heart" is an instrumental by the Irish folk group The Corrs, taken from their third album In Blue (2000). It is influenced by Celtic music, featuring violin and tin whistle. It was composed by violinist Sharon Corr, and was recorded specifically for the BBC Northern Ireland four-part series, Rebel Heart (2001), and the band subsequently decided to use it as album closer for the In Blue album. In January 2001, it was nominated for a Grammy Award for Best Pop Instrumental Performance.

According to The Corrs official website, Sharon is quoted as saying:

"I wrote it in Malibu on piano when we were recording Talk on Corners. It sat around for a long time and then the BBC were looking for some music for their big Autumn drama about the 1916 Easter Rising in Ireland. It has a very Irish melody and we added the tin whistle and so on and it fitted the bill."

Steven McDonald wrote for AllMusic that "Rebel Heart" "stirs itself up full-bloodily to provide the album with an anthem".
