= Dream of You (Sharon Corr album) =

2010 debut studio album by Sharon Corr

Studio album by Sharon Corr
- Released: 10 September 2010
- Genre: Celtic; pop; rock
- Length: 46:54
- Label: Rhino
- Producer: Billy Farrell

Sharon Corr chronology
Dream of You (2010)	The Same Sun (2013)

Singles from Dream of You
- 1. "It's Not a Dream" Released: 28 August 2009; 2. "Everybody's Got to Learn Sometime" Released: 6 September 2010; 3. "So Long Ago" Released: December 2010; 4. "Over It" Released: 25 June 2011

Professional ratings
Review scores
Source	Rating
Allmusic	3.5/5 stars

Dream of You is the debut studio album by Sharon Corr of The Corrs, released in September 2010 on Rhino Records. The album peaked at No. 15 on the New Zealand Pop Albums chart and No. 37 on the UK Pop Albums chart.

== Background ==
The first single, "It's Not a Dream", was released a year earlier on 28 August 2009 and peaked at No. 29 on the Irish Singles Chart. On 6 September 2010, Corr's cover of The Korgis song "Everybody's Got to Learn Sometime" was released as the second single. The album cover art and track listing was revealed on 30 July 2010 through Corr's official website. A third single, "So Long Ago", was released to radio in December 2010.

To promote the album, Corr embarked on the Dream of You Tour in August 2011. The album was digitally re-released with two bonus tracks, including the promotional radio single "Over It", on 26 July to coincide with this. Another bonus track, "Someone Else's Lover", was made available from the official store of Corr's website.

== Critical reception ==
Adrienne Murphy of Hot Press proclaimed "Dream Of You, her solo debut, is the culmination of Sharon’s recent surge in creativity. Featuring seven self-penned songs, several instrumental pieces and a couple of gorgeous covers, Dream Of You is Sharon’s first foray into the recording studio as lead vocalist, a role that suits her strong, distinctive voice...All told, Dream Of You is a hugely impressive album."

Jon O'Brien of Allmusic found, "Dream of You doesn't stray too far from the Corrs' template, featuring a mixture of radio-friendly choruses, Celtic strings, and Fleetwood Mac-inspired soft rock."

== Track listing ==
All songs written by Sharon Corr, except where noted.

No.	Title	Writer(s)	Length
1.	"Our Wedding Day" (instrumental)	Traditional	2:18
2.	"Everybody's Got to Learn Sometime"	James Warren	3:13
3.	"It's Not a Dream"		4:08
4.	"Mná na hÉireann" (featuring Jeff Beck)	Seán Ó Riada	5:45
5.	"Buenos Aires" (featuring Álex Ubago)		3:53
6.	"So Long Ago"		3:35
7.	"Smalltown Boy"	Steven Bronski; Laurence Cole; Jimmy Somerville	5:03
8.	"Cooley's Reel" (instrumental)	Traditional	3:19
9.	"Butterflies"		4:22
10.	"Dream of You"		3:49
11.	"Real World"		3:55
12.	"Love Me Better"		3:39

Digital download bonus tracks
No.	Title	Writer(s)	Length
13.	"Over It"		2:59
14.	"Jenny's Chickens"	Traditional	2:44

Official store bonus track
No.	Title	Length
13.	"Someone Else's Lover"	3:06

== Release history ==
Region	Date	Label	Format
Ireland	10 September 2010	Warner Music	CD, digital download
Brazil, France	13 September 2010	Warner Music	CD, digital download
United Kingdom	13 September 2010	Rhino Records	CD, digital download
Italy	14 September 2010	Warner Music	CD, digital download
Spain	21 September 2010	Warner Music	CD, digital download
Australia, Germany, Netherlands	24 September 2010	Warner Music	CD, digital download
Poland	4 October 2010	Warner Music	CD, digital download
