= It's Not a Dream =

Single by Sharon Corr

from the album Dream of You
- Released: August 28, 2009
- Recorded: 2009
- Genre: Irish Rock, Pop
- Length: 4:07
- Label: BobbyJean
- Songwriter(s): Sharon Corr

Sharon Corr singles chronology
"It's Not a Dream" (2009)	"Me and My Teddy Bear" (2009)

It's Not a Dream is the first single by Irish singer–songwriter Sharon Corr, taken from her debut solo album Dream of You.

On 15 July, Sharon appeared on television show This Morning, having been booked by host Phillip Schofield via Twitter to confirm the release of a solo album and single.

Corr has been promoting the single with appearances at the Isle of Wight Festival, Glastonbury, and a number of other European summer festivals.

According to Sharon Corr's official website, within hours the song broke into the top 100 on iTunes through digital downloads.

== Track listing ==
1. "It's Not a Dream" – 4:07

== Charts ==
Chart	Peak position
Irish Singles Chart	29
UK Singles Chart	167

== Release history ==
Region	Date	Label	Format
Ireland	August 28, 2009	Bobbyjean Records	digital download
United Kingdom	August 31, 2009	Bobbyjean, Binary to Finary	digital download
