= Rebel Heart (TV series) =

2001 British television drama

- Starring: James D'Arcy; Vincent Regan; Paloma Baeza; Brendan Coyle
- Countries of origin: United Kingdom & Republic of Ireland
- No. of episodes: 4

Production
- Running time: 50 minutes per episode on BBC One & 1hr 10mins (inc. adverts breaks) on RTÉ One

Original release
- Network: BBC One & RTÉ One
- Release: 7 January – 28 January 2001

Rebel Heart is a 2001 British four-part television drama starring James D'Arcy as the fictional Ernie Coyne, an Irish nationalist. It is in four parts, and set during the Irish War of Independence from 1916 (The Easter Rising) until the end of the Civil War. Coyne idolised Michael Collins, thus Collins featured frequently, both as a leader and as a friend. The series generated a large amount of controversy before its release.

== Main cast ==
Actor	Role
James D'Arcy	Ernie Coyne
Vincent Regan	Tom O'Toole
Frank Laverty	Kelly
Paloma Baeza	Ita Feeney
Dawn Bradfield	Ursula Feeney
Brendan Coyle	Michael Collins
Lorcan Cranitch	Inspector Nelson

== Production ==
The idea for a series about the Easter Rising and Irish Civil War first emerged in 1994.

Despite most major characters being Irish, the leading roles were mostly played by British-born actors.

== Plot ==
=== First episode ===
In the first instalment of Rebel Heart we are introduced to the character Ernie Coyne and his exploits during the Easter Rising of 1916. Coyne's nationalistic views are contrasted against the working class marxism of the other characters, including Tom O'Toole and Kelly. On the evening of his first day at the General Post Office Coyne's mother comes by to try and convince him to come home. The upper class manner in which she is dressed is commented on by O'Toole and Kelly because of their working class origins. Coyne takes the job of runner (dispatch carrier), relaying orders between the different units around Dublin that have been cut off from one another. When delivering his first message to St Stephen's Green he meets sisters Ita Feeney and Ursula Feeney who, with a group of republican soldiers, are pinned down by enemy machine gun fire. One of the sisters kills the machine gunner thus stopping the fire that is pinning the republican soldiers down and allowing them to fall back to the College of Surgeons. After delivering his report Coyne goes off on his other run where he continually dodges danger whilst delivering his messages.

On his final run down to Northumberland Road all he finds is the dead bodies of the republicans that have been killed by the British. However he is able to locate four remaining survivors of the unit to whom he gives the chocolate that his mother gave him earlier as it is painfully clear that the four men will die. The rebellion collapses, when it emerges that the Irish people have not risen to support it. In fact the reaction to the rebellion from most Irish people, both Protestant and Roman Catholic, was hostile. As the government forces close in, Patrick Pearse ordered a general unconditional surrender. Coyne is captured and imprisoned with the rest of his associates, refusing the special treatment arranged for him by his influential father.

The episode finishes with a number of the rebel leaders, such as Patrick Pearse and Thomas Clarke, being tried by military tribunal and executed for treason (for leading a rebellion while the United Kingdom was at war with Imperial Germany).

=== Second episode ===
The Irish Volunteers are released from jail in 1916, their early release a gesture of attempted conciliation by the British authorities. When they arrive in Dublin aboard a train they are greeted by a fervently nationalistic crowd, waving Irish tricolours. Coyne returns to his upper-middle-class family in Dublin. He has secured a place at the prestigious Trinity College Dublin, leading to the contempt of some of his working-class fellow Easter Rising veterans.

However, Coyne is soon involved with separatist politics again. He involves himself in vote-rigging in the 1918 General Election in an attempt to boost Sinn Féin's chances against the liberal nationalist Irish Parliamentary Party and unionist Irish Unionist Party, much to the disgust of his respectable parents. Sinn Féin won the election in a landslide victory, often for uncontested seats, and this gave a more official nature to their claim to speak for the people of Ireland.

His involvement leads to Coyne again becoming involved with the militant wing of the movement, who wanted to drive out the British by killing British soldiers and members of the Royal Irish Constabulary. One of the veterans of the Easter Rising, Michael Collins is playing a leading role in the embryonic Irish Republican Army. A number of events such as the burial of County Meath militant Thomas Ashe, who had died on hunger strike, persuaded Coyne and many other Irishmen to take up arms against the government forces.

=== Third episode ===
It is now 1920. Posing as an insurance salesman, Coyne is sent to the west of the country to co-ordinate rebel activities there. Arriving in West Cork, Coyne is angered to find the local movement disorganised and ill-equipped with commanders who are halfhearted and reluctant to disturb their quiet lives in the small community. With a new-found assertiveness, Coyne re-invigorates the recruits, stealing rifles from a British unit and later mounting a successful ambush of an army patrol. Coyne is worried when his men speak of how they plan to fight the Irish Protestant Unionists after they have driven out the British. He and another rebel are forced to kill two RIC officers who stumble upon their activities. Coyne swells with pride at his leadership abilities and he cockily seduces the daughter of a farmer who shelters him and several of his men, an act he soon regrets as he remembers his feelings for Ita.

In Belfast, Tom O'Toole and Albert Kelly stage an attack on the headquarters of the RIC to avenge the deaths of members of Ita's family who were brutally gunned down by an RIC murder squad. The attack fails and both O'Toole and Kelly are wounded and captured. Coyne is recalled to Belfast and he meets with Michael Collins who informs him that O'Toole and Kelly are in prison. Coyne's humility is restored as Collins reminds him of the bloodier and much more difficult war going on in the rest of the country. The rebels break into Belfast prison, successfully breaking out O'Toole and Kelly but Coyne is badly wounded as they escape.

=== Fourth episode ===
In 1921, Coyne recovers from his wounds in a rural hideout in Antrim in Northern Ireland. His mother travels from Dublin to visit but Coyne pretends to be asleep, unwilling to speak to her. Kelly and Ursula agree to marry but their happiness is soured by news of the Treaty of 1921 in which a deputation to Britain led by Michael Collins agreed to partition the nation into the new Republic in the south and the British-ruled North. Ita, whose family are in Belfast, is angry and bitter, believing that the new government has sold them out, condemning them to live as a persecuted minority in the Unionist-dominated north.

Arriving in Dublin in 1922, Coyne, Ita, Kelly and Ursula are disheartened to see the Free State already becoming a traditional-style government based on wealth and power, ending the dream of a worker's republic. Even O'Toole, now a close associate of Collins, has been seduced by the trappings of authority and position. At Kelly and Ursula's wedding, O'Toole is Best Man but he and Kelly angrily argue over the Treaty, mirroring the rapidly emerging divisions in the country between pro and anti-Treaty factions. Coyne reluctantly sides with Collins but he is torn between his desire for his country to avoid civil war and his loyalty to his former comrades. Kelly joins the anti-Treaty rebels as they seize key positions in Dublin and even O'Toole's younger sister Eileen joins their ranks. Collins orders his troops to begin storming the rebel positions. O'Toole approaches the rebel barricades to talk his sister into going home but a nearby nervous soldier discharges a round, killing her.

As fighting breaks out across Dublin, beginning the Irish Civil War, a distraught and angry O'Toole leads his troops in pursuit of the rebels, hunting them down ruthlessly. Seeing Kelly about to be shot by a government soldier, Coyne kills the latter and switches sides, joining Kelly. Injured in the fighting, Coyne is left in a deserted building whilst Kelly goes to find an escape route. O'Toole abruptly enters the room and he and Coyne fire simultaneously, mortally wounding each other. Kelly comes back and O'Toole aims his gun at him but then changes his mind, deciding to let his old friend go. As Kelly escapes to meet up with Ursula and Ita, O'Toole and Coyne lie side by side, reconciling with each other as they both succumb to their wounds.

== Controversy ==
The production of Rebel Heart proved to be controversial. It was most heavily criticised in Britain for what was perceived as its slanted viewpoint of the events between 1916 and 1922.

Criticised in particular was the involvement of the BBC in making a film purportedly propagandising for the IRA during the delicate peace process in Northern Ireland. The Ulster Unionist leader David Trimble attacked the corporation for making a series that could be used as propaganda for the modern IRA.

== Media releases ==
The series has not yet been released on DVD.

== See also ==
- The Wind That Shakes The Barley (film)
- Rebel Heart (song)
- Michael Collins (film)
