= The Corrs =

Irish musical group

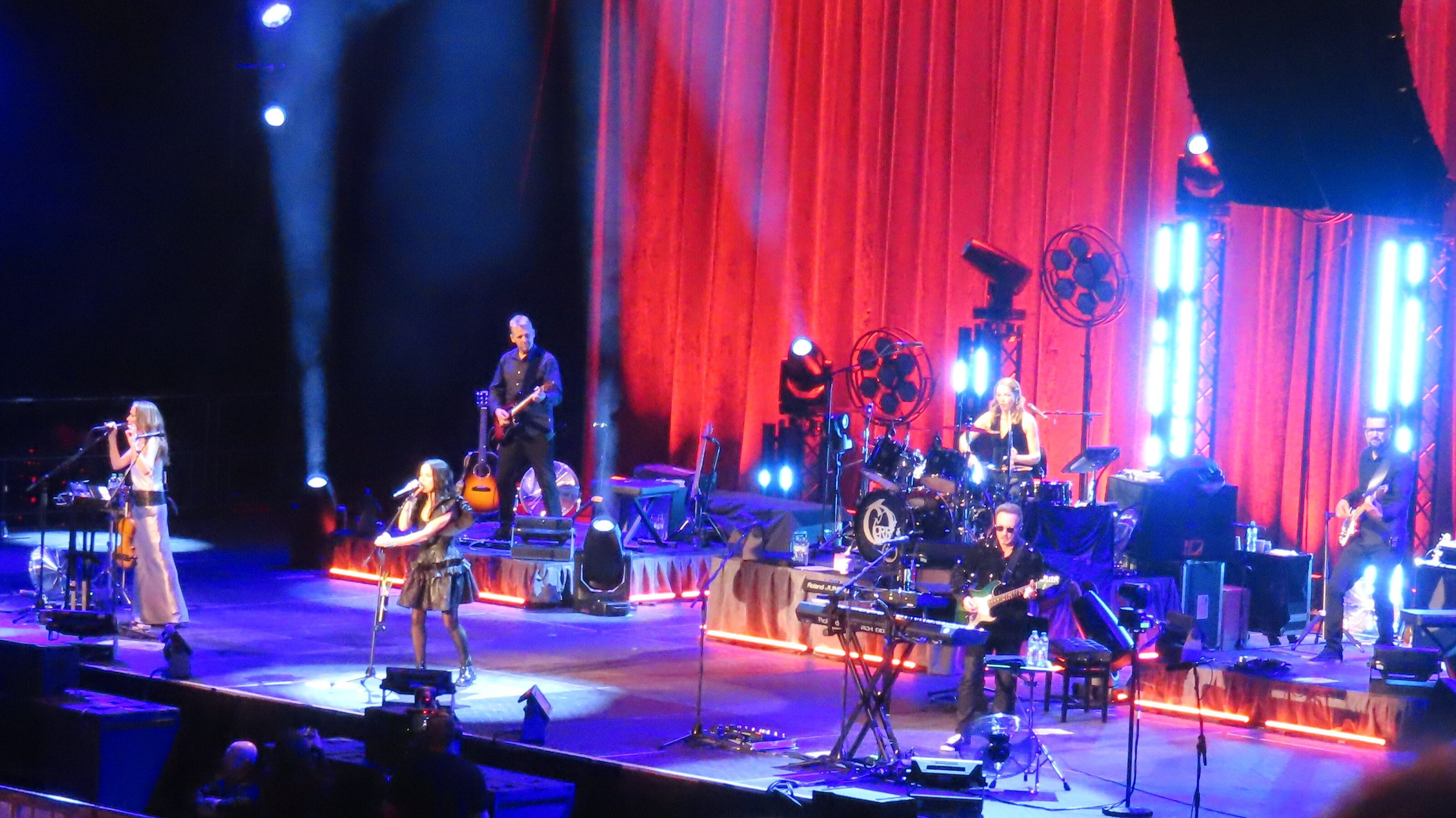
- The Corrs performing at the NEC Arena, Birmingham on 14 November 2024

Background information
- Origin: Dundalk, County Louth, Ireland
- Genres: Pop rock; folk rock; Celtic fusion
- Years active: 1990–2006; 2015–present
- Labels: 143; Lava; Atlantic; Eastwest; Warner Bros.
- Members: Andrea Corr; Caroline Corr; Jim Corr; Sharon Corr
- Website: thecorrsofficial.com

The Corrs are an Irish family band consisting of siblings Andrea (lead vocals, tin whistle, mandolin, ukulele), Sharon (violin, keyboards, vocals), Caroline (drums, percussion, piano, bodhrán, vocals) and Jim (guitar, piano, keyboards, vocals). Their music combines pop rock with traditional Irish themes. They are from Dundalk in County Louth, Ireland.

The Corrs have released seven studio albums and numerous singles that have reached Platinum in many countries. They have sold 40 million albums worldwide. Released in 1997, Talk on Corners, their most successful album to date, reached multi-Platinum status in Australia. In the UK, it was the highest-selling album of the year, and is also listed among the best-selling albums in the UK. The band are one of a small number of acts who have held the top two positions simultaneously in the UK album charts, with Talk on Corners at number one and Forgiven, Not Forgotten, their debut album from 1995, at number two. Talk on Corners was the year's third highest-selling album in Australia. The band's third studio album, In Blue, reached number one in seventeen countries in 2000.

The Corrs have received one Brit Award (for Best International Group), two Grammy Award nominations, and were awarded honorary MBEs in 2005 for their contributions to music and charity. They have been actively involved in philanthropic activities and have performed in numerous charity concerts, such as The Prince's Trust event in 2004 and Live 8 in 2005. The band were inactive for almost ten years because Jim and Caroline were raising families and Andrea and Sharon were pursuing solo careers while raising families of their own. According to Sharon, it was uncertain if or when the Corrs would reunite. Rumours of a reunion appeared in early 2015, and in a radio interview with Chris Evans in June 2015, Andrea confirmed that the Corrs were working on a new album and would play that year's BBC Radio 2 Live in Hyde Park festival. Their sixth studio album, White Light, was released on 27 November 2015, and was accompanied by a European tour. After two years, their seventh studio album, Jupiter Calling, was released on 10 November 2017.

== History ==
=== 1990–1994: Early commercial success ===
The Corrs are from Dundalk, County Louth, in Ireland. Jim and Sharon initially began playing as a duo, often at McManus's, their aunt's pub. While their younger sisters Caroline and Andrea were still attending school, Jim and Sharon added them in 1990 to form a quartet. Their career took off in 1991 when they auditioned for the film The Commitments. Jim, Sharon and Caroline each had small parts as musicians, while Andrea had a speaking part as Sharon Rabbitte. John Hughes noticed them when they auditioned for the film and agreed to become their manager.

In 1994, the USA ambassador to Ireland, Jean Kennedy Smith, invited them to perform at the 1994 FIFA World Cup in Boston after seeing them play a gig at Whelan's Music Bar in Dublin. After an appearance at the 1996 Summer Olympics in Atlanta, United States, The Corrs joined Celine Dion's worldwide Falling into You Around the World Tour as a supporting act.

=== 1995–1999: International fame ===
Jason Flom, Atlantic Records's head of A&R, recommended that they meet David Foster, a Canadian musician, producer, composer and arranger. The Corrs played live for Foster and he agreed to sign them to Atlantic Records. They extended their stay in the US for over five months to record their debut album, Forgiven, Not Forgotten. It featured six instrumental selections among its Celtic-influenced tracks. The album sold well in Ireland, Australia, Canada, Japan, Norway and Spain. Major success in the US and the UK, however, was not immediately forthcoming. Eventually, the album reached Platinum status in the UK and Australia, and 4× Platinum in Ireland, making it one of the most successful debuts by an Irish group.

The Corrs' next album, 1997's Talk on Corners, was produced by Glen Ballard, who was respected for his collaboration with Alanis Morissette. The Corrs also collaborated with Carole Bayer Sager, Oliver Leiber, Rick Nowels and Billy Steinberg. It was successful in Ireland and the UK and entered the Australian album charts at number 3.

After the band recorded a version of "Dreams" for a Fleetwood Mac tribute album, they re-released Talk on Corners, with new remixes of "What Can I Do?", "So Young" and "Runaway". The special edition topped the charts worldwide and again reached multi-Platinum status in the UK and Australia.

In June 1998, the Corrs participated in the Pavarotti and Friends for the Children of Liberia charity concert. The concert was held in Modena, Italy and was hosted by Luciano Pavarotti. The concert aimed to raise money to build the Pavarotti and Friends Liberian Children's Village, to provide refuge for children in Liberia.

The following year, the Corrs received a BRIT Award for Best International Band. They performed live on MTV's Unplugged on 5 October 1999 at Ardmore Studios, County Wicklow, Ireland. The resulting CD and DVD sold 2.7 million copies and featured live performances of previously released songs, plus a new song, "Radio", later featured on their third album, In Blue.

=== 2000–2002: Mainstream success ===
In 2000, the Corrs returned to mainstream success with their third album. Unlike their previous albums, In Blue moved towards mainstream pop. In Blue hit number one in its first sales week in, Ireland, Australia, Germany, Switzerland, Austria, the UK and debuted at No. 2 in France and Norway. It climbed to the top spot during its second week in Sweden and Spain.

The Corrs worked with Alejandro Sanz on In Blue, recording "Una Noche (One Night)", a duet between Sanz and Andrea Corr; Sanz played Andrea's love interest in the music video. In return, the Corrs performed "Me Iré (The Hardest Day)" with him on his album, El Alma Al Aire. The Corrs collaborated with Robert Lange to produce a mainstream hit single, "Breathless", which reached number 20 in the Billboard Hot 100, number seven in Australia, number three in Ireland and New Zealand, and topped the charts in the UK, and earned the band a Grammy nomination for Best Pop Performance by a Duo or Group with Vocals at the 43rd Annual Grammy Awards. The album went straight to number one in the Irish Albums Chart, the third highest single-week sales in the history of the charts, behind U2's The Best of 1980–1990 and Oasis' Be Here Now. In Blue achieved Platinum sales in the US, double platinum in the UK, and 4× Platinum in Australia.

During the production of the album, the Corrs' mother, Jean, died while waiting for a lung transplant. She was buried at St. Patrick's cemetery in Dundalk. "No More Cry", written by Andrea and Caroline Corr for the album, was written to help their father get over his grief.

In 2001, the Corrs released their first compilation album, Best of The Corrs. The album featured previously released songs and new tracks, such as the singles "Would You Be Happier?", "Make You Mine" and "Lifting Me". The album did not chart highly in Ireland but reached Platinum status in Australia. The Corrs collaborated with Josh Groban, recording "Canto Alla Vita", for his eponymous debut album.

When the band returned to Ireland, they hosted another live concert at Ardmore Studios, where they previously performed for the MTV's Unplugged series. Guest performers included Bono from U2 and Ronnie Wood from The Rolling Stones. During the concert, Bono joined Andrea Corr for a duet of Nancy Sinatra's "Summer Wine" and a performance of Ryan Adams' "When the Stars Go Blue". Ronnie Wood joined the band onstage to play guitar on their version of Jimi Hendrix's "Little Wing" and the Rolling Stones' "Ruby Tuesday". These performances were recorded and compiled on a live album, VH1 Presents: The Corrs, Live in Dublin, which was released in the UK.

=== 2003–2005: Later years ===
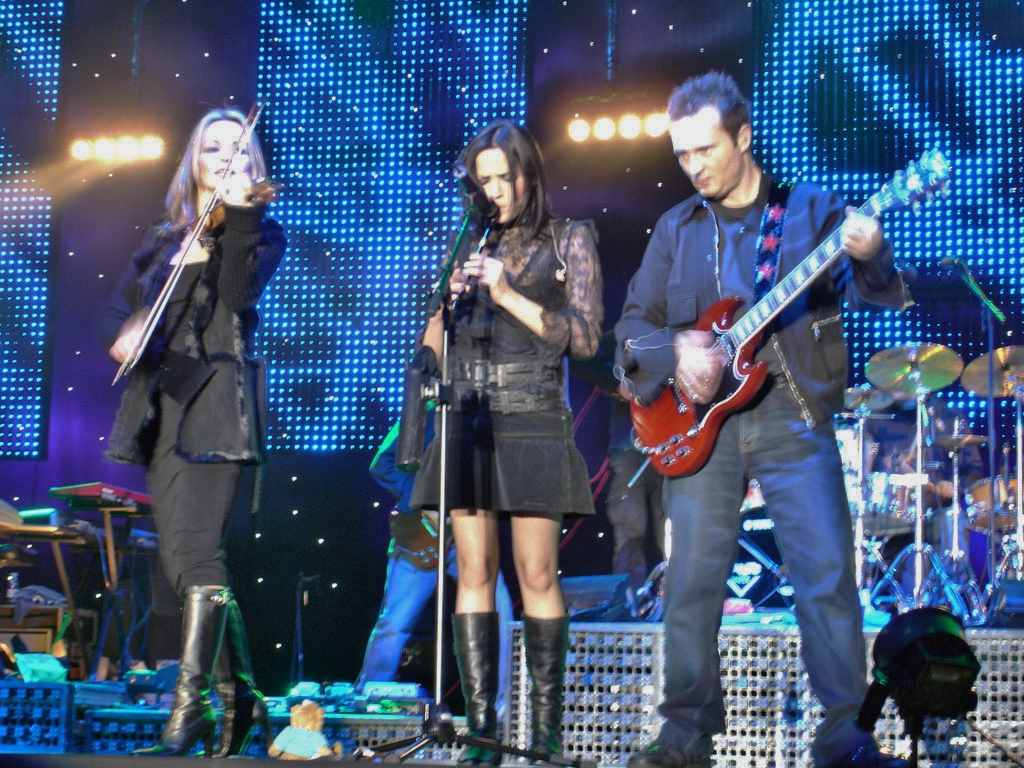
(L-R) Sharon, Andrea and Jim Corr in concert in 2004

In 2003, Andrea Corr recorded "Time Enough for Tears", written by Bono and Gavin Friday for the film In America. This track was featured on the Corrs' 2004 album, Borrowed Heaven. Recorded over an 18-month period in Dublin and Los Angeles, Borrowed Heaven was produced by Olle Romo, who previously worked with Melanie C and Kelly Clarkson. The album marked the Corrs' return to the folk rock genre with a slightly heavier emphasis on guitars. Nevertheless, the album was not as successful as their predecessors, but at least successful enough to enter at No.2 in both the UK and Germany and reach silver status in the UK as well as gold in Germany. Jason Duffy temporarily joined the band as drummer, filling in for Caroline while she was pregnant with her second child and unable to tour. Borrowed Heaven was dedicated to the band's parents.

The band also dedicated their 2005 album Home to their late mother. It is regarded as a traditional Irish album as the band covered traditional Irish songs taken from their mother's songbook to commemorate their 15 years as a band. The album was produced by Mitchell Froom and featured the BBC Radio 2 Orchestra. The songs on Home spanned the history of Irish music. It also included two songs in Irish, "Bríd Óg Ní Mháille (Brigid O'Malley)" and "Buachaill Ón Éirne (Boy from Lough Erne)". Home had success in Ireland, France (reaching No. 5) and Germany (reaching No. 12) and was certified silver in the UK.

=== 2006–2014: Solo projects and retrospective releases ===
The Corrs went on an extended hiatus starting in 2006, raising their own families and pursuing solo careers.

Andrea released her first solo album, Ten Feet High, on 25 June 2007. It was produced by Nellee Hooper, who has worked with Björk, Gwen Stefani and Madonna; Bono was an executive producer. The first single released from the album was "Shame on You (to Keep My Love from Me)". On 30 May 2011, Andrea released her second album, Lifelines, an album of cover songs, with The Blue Nile's "Tinseltown in the Rain" as the first single. Sharon started pursuing a solo career in 2009, her single "It's Not a Dream" was released on 29 August 2009. On 10 September 2010 her debut album Dream of You was released, with her cover of "Everybody's Got to Learn Sometime" by The Korgis as the first single. Sharon finished writing her second album in March 2012. The album that emerged was called The Same Sun.

The Corrs released their second compilation album, Dreams: The Ultimate Corrs Collection, on 20 November 2006. The album consisted of several of the band's hits, as well as tracks that had not previously been released on Corrs albums, such as "I Know My Love", a collaboration with The Chieftains and "All I Have to Do Is Dream", Andrea's duet with Laurent Voulzy. The album also featured remixes of "When the Stars Go Blue" and "Goodbye". The latter was released as a download-only single to promote the album. However, the album charted poorly, reaching number 24 in Ireland. On 25 September 2007, the Corrs released another compilation album, The Works. The album consists of three CDs that feature previously released songs. It performed worse than its predecessor, failing to chart at all.

=== 2015–2017: Return with White Light and Jupiter Calling ===
In June 2015, Andrea announced that the Corrs would perform at Live in Hyde Park on 13 November and were in the process of making a new record. On 17 September 2015, the band confirmed their sixth studio album, White Light, which was released on 27 November 2015 and was accompanied by a European tour, which took place in 2016. According to an interview, released by Jim to Music Radar, the band had already completed the recording for their seventh studio album, Jupiter Calling. Produced by T Bone Burnett, it was released on 10 November 2017, and was preceded by a concert on 19 October at the Royal Albert Hall in London.

=== 2020–present: Second return and touring Australia ===
In 2020, Taylor Swift included a cover of The Corrs' Breathless in a setlist of songs by female artists to commemorate women's history month. She described the artists she had chosen as "faraway mentors who taught me how music could make someone's life easier and more magical" and said they had guided her "melodically, lyrically, spiritually and emotionally".

On 26 November 2022, the Corrs performed together for the first time since 2017, playing to a crowd of approximately 11,000 at Hope Estate Winery, in Australia's Hunter Valley, their first concert in Australia in 21 years. The concert was a success, and the Corrs announced on 4 December 2022 that they would tour Australia and New Zealand in October and November 2023 and later added dates in Jakarta, Indonesia and Manila, Philippines.

== Musical style and influences ==
When asked to describe their genre, Caroline Corr said it was a "blend of modern rhythms and technology with acoustic instruments, violin, tin whistle, drums and of course the voices, the marrying of these instruments is our sound". The Corrs' music is typically categorised as a mixture of pop rock and folk rock. This is evident in their first two albums, Forgiven, Not Forgotten and Talk on Corners, although Andrea described the genre of Talk on Corners by saying "it [has] got more of an edgy feel, a little bit more guitar-orientated and also an Irish sound, which is in Forgiven, Not Forgotten."

In Blue moved towards mainstream pop, placing heavy emphasis on synthesizers. The move attracted criticism from many; one Entertainment Weekly critic called it "a disheartening example of musical ethnic cleansing". A USA Today critic called it "the best mainstream pop album you're likely to come across".

Borrowed Heaven placed heavier emphasis on guitars, while retaining the original folk rock genre. Home is a traditional Irish album, where the band covered many traditional Irish songs. The album contained songs from different eras of Irish music, including a 1982 song written by Phil Lynott ("Old Town") while the 1,000-year-old "Return to Fingal" featured as a bonus track on the Japanese, limited German and Spanish editions. White Light returned to a similar sound to In Blue, with much more electronic-based instrumentation, while Jupiter Calling is characterised as a more stripped back live performance with minimal overdubbing.

The Corrs' main influences were their parents, who were both musicians and encouraged them to learn instruments. They drew inspiration from musicians such as The Eagles, The Police, The Carpenters, Simon and Garfunkel and Fleetwood Mac, which Sharon said in an interview with CNN is the reason "our songs are very, very melodic and [harmonious]".

== Philanthropy ==
The Corrs have been active in supporting charitable and philanthropic causes and disaster relief. In 1998, the Corrs participated in the Pavarotti and Friends for the Children of Liberia charity concert. The concert was held in Modena, Italy and was hosted by Luciano Pavarotti. Among the other participating artists were Jon Bon Jovi, Natalie Cole, Pino Daniele, Celine Dion, Florent Pagny, Eros Ramazzotti, Spice Girls, Vanessa L. Williams, Stevie Wonder, Trisha Yearwood and Zucchero. The concert raised money that was used to build the Pavarotti and Friends Liberian Children's Village and to provide a refuge for orphans in Liberia during the civil war. The Corrs, along with Sinéad O'Connor, Van Morrison, Boyzone, U2 and Enya held a charity concert in 1998, to raise money for the victims of the Omagh bombing in Northern Ireland.

The Corrs' mother, Jean, died in Freeman Hospital in Newcastle, England. The Corrs showed their appreciation to the hospital by performing a one-off charity concert, held in 2001 at the Telewest Arena, raising more than £100,000. The money was used to extend the William Leech Centre of the hospital, which is dedicated to research into lung treatment. The city of Newcastle presented them a limited edition painting of Tyneside's quayside in return.

The Corrs played at a 2004 charity concert for The Prince's Trust, a UK-based charity that provides help, training, financial, and practical support to UK citizens aged between 14 and 30. They performed with The Buggles, Will Young, Blue, Avril Lavigne, Lenny Kravitz, Busted, Anastacia, Nelly Furtado, Sugababes and Natasha Bedingfield and raised more than £1 million.

They are ambassadors for the Nelson Mandela's "46664" campaign, where they performed live to raise awareness towards HIV/AIDS in Africa. The concert was held on 29 November 2003 in Cape Town, South Africa. The concert aimed to "[raise] awareness of HIV in South Africa and launched the 46664 campaign" and the money raised was donated to the Nelson Mandela Foundation for Aids. During the Edinburgh Live 8 on 2 July 2005, the Corrs performed "When the Stars Go Blue" alongside Bono to promote the Make Poverty History campaign, which aimed to increase awareness and pressure governments into taking actions towards relieving extreme poverty.

In recognition of their charity work, the Corrs were made honorary Members of the Order of the British Empire in 2005 by Queen Elizabeth II.

== Members ==
- Andrea Corr (born 1974) – lead vocals, tin whistle, ukulele, mandolin
- Caroline Corr (born 1973) – drums, percussion, bodhrán, piano, vocals
- Sharon Corr (born 1970) – violin, keyboards, vocals
- Jim Corr (born 1964) – guitar, piano, keyboards, vocals

In late 1995, Anthony Drennan (lead guitar) and Keith Duffy (bass guitar) joined the band and remained a permanent part of the touring and recording line-up. When Drennan was released in late 1997 to tour with Genesis, his temporary replacement for two legs of the Talk on Corners tour was Irish guitarist Conor Brady. Duffy's younger brother Jason joined the line-up as drummer for the Borrowed Heaven tour due to Caroline's pregnancy. Both Drennan and Duffy re-joined the band for their 2015 return.

== Discography ==
Studio albums

- Forgiven, Not Forgotten (1995)
- Talk on Corners (1997)
- In Blue (2000)
- Borrowed Heaven (2004)
- Home (2005)
- White Light (2015)
- Jupiter Calling (2017)

== Tours ==
- Forgiven, Not Forgotten World Tour (1996–1997)
- Talk on Corners World Tour (1997–1999)
- In Blue Tour (2000–2001)
- Borrowed Heaven tour (2004)
- The Corrs: In Concert (2004–2005)
- White Light Tour (2016)
- The Corrs Down Under (2023)
- Talk on Corners Tour 2024 (2024–2025)
- The Farmer's Dog (2025)
- Summer Sunshine 2025 (2025)

== Awards and achievements ==
=== Grammy Awards ===
Year	Nominee / work	Award	Result
2000	"Breathless"	Best Pop Performance by a Duo or Group with Vocals	Nominated
2000	"Rebel Heart"	Best Pop Instrumental Performance	Nominated

=== BRIT Awards ===
Year	Nominee / work	Award	Result
1999	The Corrs	Best International Group	Won
2001	The Corrs	Best International Group	Nominated

=== World Music Awards ===
Year	Nominee / work	Award	Result
1999	The Corrs	World's Best-Selling Irish Group	Won

=== Meteor Music Awards ===
Year	Nominee / work	Award	Result
2005	The Corrs	Best Irish Pop Act	Nominated
2006	The Corrs	Best Irish Band	Nominated

=== Order of the British Empire ===
- Honorary members of the Order of the British Empire: 2005

== See also ==
- Music of Ireland
- List of artists who reached number one in Ireland
- List of Irish Grammy Award winners and nominees
