= Ardmore Studios =

Film studio in Ireland

Coordinates: 53°11′48″N 6°07′30″W

Ardmore Studios, in Bray, County Wicklow, is Ireland's oldest continuously operating film studio.

It opened in 1958 under the management of Emmet Dalton and Louis Elliman. Since then, it has evolved through many managements and owners. It has been the base for many successful Irish and international productions, including The Spy Who Came in from the Cold, Fair City, Braveheart, My Left Foot and Veronica Guerin.

The studio struggled through several changes of ownership in its early years, entering receivership in 1963, 1971 and 1972. After several ownership changes, the studio became the government-backed National Film Studios of Ireland in 1975, under the management of Sheamus Smith. During Smith's tenure, notable movies based there included Michael Crichton's The First Great Train Robbery, starring Sean Connery. When government funding was withdrawn in the early 1980s, Ardmore was briefly owned by the Indian producer Mahmud Sipra, before the studios were taken over in 1986 by a consortium made up of Mary Tyler Moore Enterprises, Tara Productions (Ireland) Limited, and the state National Development Corporation. Tara CEO Morgan O'Sullivan attempted to attract major international film and television productions to Ireland, but several planned MTM productions failed to materialise, and when MTM was sold to the UK company Television South in 1988, the MTM stake was sold to Ardmore Studios International, a company owned equally by U2 manager Paul McGuinness and show business accountant Ossie Kilkenny. Under managing director Kevin Moriarty, the studios thrived during the 1990s and 2000s as the Irish film and television industry expanded. Notable productions during this time included Far and Away (1992), The Tudors (2007–2010) and Camelot (2011). Following the opening of rival Ashford Studios, Ardmore began to struggle financially. In 2013 Siún Ní Raghallaigh was appointed CEO, implementing cost cuts and restructuring the company. In 2018, Ardmore was sold to Olcott Entertainment, an Irish company headed by businessman Joe Devine, who had developed another rival studio, Troy, in Limerick during 2017. Ní Raghallaigh was retained as CEO of both studios. Olcott sold Ardmore and Troy to a US consortium headed by Hackman Capital Partners in 2021.

== History ==
=== Irish film before Ardmore Studios ===
Ambitious Irish-based filmmaking began when producer-director Sidney Olcott made his first visit to Ireland in 1910. Prior to this time most Irish filmmaking consisted of newsreels. Olcott's first movie based in Ireland was The Lad from Old Ireland, produced by Kalem. His follow-up was Rory O'More, based on the events of the Irish Rebellions of 1641 and 1798, which earned the disapproval of both the British Home Office and the Irish Catholic Church. Olcott continued Irish filmmaking, with most of his films shot in County Kerry, specifically in the towns of Beaufort, Dunloe and Killarney. To facilitate year-round filming, Olcott planned the building of a serviced studio based in Beaufort. The outbreak of World War I derailed this plan. Irish filmmaking continued, with native-born directors initiating their own work, but through the 1920s and 1930s and 1940s, no purpose-built studio facilitated year-round filmmaking in Ireland.

=== Early years of Ardmore Studios ===
Finally, in the late 1950s, Emmet Dalton and Louis Elliman, with funding from the Irish government and the promise of production finance from the United States, acquired a 10-acre site in Bray, Co. Wicklow, about 25 kilometres south of Dublin city centre. They began converting the site into a modern film studio, opening for business in May 1958. The first production to emerge the studios was an adaptation of Walter Macken's play, Home Is the Hero, starring Macken and directed by Emmy Award-winning Fielder Cooke for RKO Pictures. Renowned British director George Pollock shot the next two productions at the studio, Sally's Irish Rogue and The Big Birthday, both based on popular Abbey Theatre comedies. The studios landed its first major motion picture with 1959's Shake Hands with the Devil, starring Oscar winner James Cagney and Dana Wynter. A year later progress was consolidated when Robert Mitchum appeared in Tay Garnett's A Terrible Beauty. In 1961, Ardmore Studios hosted the controversial The Mark, directed by Guy Green, which was nominated for the Palme d'Or at the Cannes Film Festival and earned its star, Stuart Whitman, an Oscar nomination. Other films produced at this time include Don Chaffey's The Webster Boys and Johnny Nobody with Cyril Cusack. Hammer Films also utilised the studios as a base for their production, The Viking Queen. Irish film workers struggled to get employment on these early films, however, leading to industrial action during filming of Of Human Bondage in 1963. Business difficulties followed, and when the Irish government called in its loans, the studios were placed in receivership, in a bid to release it from labour agreements with local film unions.

=== The National Film Studios of Ireland and MTM Ardmore Studios era ===
In 1975 Sheamus Smith became managing director of the studios and film director John Boorman assumed the role of chairman. The studios were renovated and renamed as The National Film Studios of Ireland, and subsequently hosted several major movies including The Purple Taxi, starring Fred Astaire and The Great Train Robbery starring Sean Connery.

In 1981, Boorman filmed his $11.5 million epic Excalibur, where he cast a then-unknown Liam Neeson, Gabriel Byrne and Ciarán Hinds, at the studios and in the local hills of Wicklow. Also produced during this decade was John Huston's The Dead, based on the short story by James Joyce and starring Huston's daughter, Anjelica Huston.

The withdrawal of government funding effectively closed the studios in the early 1980s. For several years the lot fell into disrepair but the studio was reactivated by an initiative led by an Irish independent company, Tara Productions, in partnership with MTM Hollywood and the Irish National Enterprise Authority. Thereafter, the renamed MTM Ardmore Studios made its mark again on the global scene with the success of My Left Foot, directed by Jim Sheridan, which earned Oscars for Daniel Day-Lewis for his portrayal of the cerebral palsy sufferer Christy Brown and for Brenda Fricker, for her portrayal of Brown's mother.

=== Later years ===
From 1989 until 1994, all interior shots of Fair City were filmed at Ardmore Studios. In 1991, a street set, known as 'The Lot', was built. In 1994, the studio hosted Mel Gibson's Oscar-winning Braveheart.

In the 2000s, Ardmore turned increasingly to servicing international television production. Major productions included The Tudors, filmed between 2006 and 2010, Camelot, filmed in 2010, starring Joseph Fiennes and Eva Green, Byzantium, directed by Neil Jordan, in 2011, and Penny Dreadful from 2014.

=== Recent years ===
In January 2017 the studios were used by RTE for Dancing with the Stars, Ireland's version of the popular British show Strictly Come Dancing. RTE had purchased the rights to make an Irish version of the popular dancing show, however, it became obvious to RTE that the studios at their television centre in Donnybrook in Dublin would not be large enough for the scale of the show, and so Ardmore Studios was chosen.

In April 2018 Irish firm Olcott Entertainment Limited officially announced the full acquisition of Ardmore, after purchasing the shares owned by Ardmore Studios Limited (68%) and Enterprise Ireland (32%).

In 2021, Olcott sold Ardmore and Troy to a US consortium led by Hackman Capital Partners. The new owners, who operate film studios around the world, are currently developing another major studio facility in nearby Greystones.

== Facilities based at Ardmore ==
During its MTM incarnation in the 1980s, Ardmore extended its facilities and built new sound stages. Today it offers 5 stages, including a water tank facility. In the early 1980s a handful of service provider companies were located on the lot. Under O'Sullivan's management, the range of Ardmore-based service and facility companies increased to include other specialised related businesses. These include:

- Digital Sound Facilities
- Lighting Facilities
- Art Departments
- Workshops and prop stores
- Production offices
- Make-up, hair and wardrobe department.

Companies located at Ardmore studios include:

- CineElectric
- Panavision
- World 2000 Entertainment

== Productions made at, or based in, the studios ==
- This Other Eden (1958)
- Shake Hands with the Devil (1959)
- Sword of Sherwood Forest (1960)
- The Mark (1961)
- Murder in Eden (1961) – (distributed by J. Arthur Rank Film Distributors) – (with Angela Douglas)
- Dementia 13 (1963)
- The Very Edge (1963)
- The Spy Who Came in from the Cold (1965)
- The Blue Max (1966)
- The Viking Queen (1967)
- The Lion in Winter (1968)
- Images (1972)
- Zardoz (1974)
- The Last Remake of Beau Geste (1977)
- The Hard Way (1980)
- Excalibur (1981)
- Angel (1982)
- My Left Foot (1989)
- Fair City (1989–1994)
- Fools of Fortune (1990)
- The Commitments (1991)
- Rock-a-Doodle (1991)
- In the Name of the Father (1993)
- Braveheart (1995)
- Space Truckers (1996)
- Angela's Ashes (1999)
- The Tailor of Panama (2001)
- Evelyn (2002)
- King Arthur (2004)
- Breakfast on Pluto (2005)
- Becoming Jane (2007)
- The Tudors (TV series) (2007–2010)
- Camelot (TV series) (2010)
- The Last Furlong (2011)
- Byzantium (2012)
- Penny Dreadful (TV series) (2014–2016)
- Dancing with the Stars (Irish version) (TV series) (2017-present)
- The Green Knight (2020)
- Beat Shazam (2022)
- The Floor (American game show) (2024)

== Music albums recorded at Ardmore ==
- The Corrs: MTV Unplugged (1999)
- VH1 Presents: The Corrs, Live in Dublin (2002)

== See also ==
- Cinema of Ireland
