= Jupiter Calling (album) =

Studio album by the Corrs
- Released: 10 November 2017
- Recorded: 2016–2017
- Studio: RAK Studios (London); The Village Recorder (Los Angeles)
- Genre: Folk
- Length: 55:17
- Label: East West
- Producer: T Bone Burnett

The Corrs chronology
White Light (2015)	Jupiter Calling (2017)

Singles from Jupiter Calling
- 1. "SOS" Released: 28 September 2017

Jupiter Calling is the seventh studio album by the Corrs, released on 10 November 2017 by East West Records. It is their first new material in two years, following White Light (2015). It was produced by T Bone Burnett, and recorded at RAK Studios in London and The Village Recorder in Los Angeles. It was promoted by a show at the Royal Albert Hall on 19 October, for which tickets were made available on 15 September.

== Background ==
Following the release of White Light in 2015, the band toured the UK and Ireland in January 2016, and continental Europe in mid-2016 on their White Light Tour. Andrea Corr spoke to The Sun in January 2016, stating that the band were not planning to record a follow-up soon after, "as long as we're all happy to continue. And we are all very happy."

== Recording and content ==
The band chose to include a song about Syria on the album, called "SOS (Song of Syria)", which they called their most "politically outspoken and evocative" song to date. Andrea also spoke of playing the song "Son of Solomon" for Burnett: "He said 'Okay, don't play that any more'. When you're on the verge of knowing something you're much better than when you know it too well. And he was right. That's when the magic happens." Caroline Corr described the recording process as "the most freeing experience we've had in the studio."

Of working with the band, Burnett complimented their "deep, generous spirit" and their "writing, singing and playing". The album was primarily recorded live, with minimal overdubbing. While working on the album, Burnett made use of 40 spools of two-inch tape and a Ludwig drum kit. The band's touring guitarist Anthony Drennan appeared on the record alongside session bassist Robbie Malone, and keyboardists Keefus Ciancia, Mike Piersante and Patrick Warren and drummer/percussionist Jay Bellerose also contributed during the album's recording process.

== Singles ==
On 21 September 2017, "Son of Solomon" was released as the first promotional single from the album. The song was accompanied by a homemade video, recorded and edited by Andrea Corr. "SOS (Song of Syria)" was released as the lead single on 29 September 2017. The Corrs premiered the song on BBC Radio 2 on 28 September 2017 and it was immediately released to YouTube after the radio premiere.

== Critical reception ==
Professional ratings
Aggregate scores
Source	Rating
Metacritic	58/100
Review scores
Source	Rating
AllMusic	3.5/5 stars
The Guardian	3/5 stars
The Irish Times	2/5 stars

Jupiter Calling received generally mixed reviews from music critics. At Metacritic, which assigns a normalized rating out of 100 to reviews from mainstream publications, the album received an average score of 58 based on four reviews, indicating "mixed or average reviews".

== Track listing ==
Track listing adapted from iTunes.

All tracks are written by The Corrs.

No.	Title	Length
1.	"Son of Solomon"	4:21
2.	"Chasing Shadows"	3:36
3.	"Bulletproof Love"	3:17
4.	"Road to Eden"	4:41
5.	"Butter Flutter"	3:44
6.	"SOS"	3:36
7.	"Dear Life"	4:18
8.	"No Go Baby"	2:46
9.	"Hit My Ground Running"	4:39
10.	"Live Before I Die"	4:10
11.	"Season of Our Love"	3:43
12.	"A Love Divine"	4:35
13.	"The Sun and the Moon"	7:51

== Charts ==
Chart (2017)	Peak position
Australian Albums (ARIA)	27
Austrian Albums (Ö3 Austria)	46
Belgian Albums (Ultratop Flanders)	30
Belgian Albums (Ultratop Wallonia)	43
Czech Albums (ČNS IFPI)	39
Dutch Albums (Album Top 100)	31
French Albums (SNEP)	52
German Albums (Offizielle Top 100)	42
Irish Albums (IRMA)	20
New Zealand Heatseeker Albums (RMNZ)	4
Portuguese Albums (AFP)	49
Scottish Albums (OCC)	14
Spanish Albums (PROMUSICAE)	13
Swiss Albums (Schweizer Hitparade)	25
UK Albums (OCC)	15
