= White Light (The Corrs album) =

2015 studio album by the Corrs

Studio album by The Corrs
- Released: 27 November 2015
- Recorded: May – October 2015
- Studio: Metropolis Studios; Chestnut Studios; (London, England)
- Genre: Pop rock; electropop; Celtic fusion
- Length: 47:54
- Label: East West
- Producer: John Shanks; The Corrs; Chris Young

The Corrs chronology
The Works (2007)	White Light (2015)	Jupiter Calling (2017)

Singles from White Light
- 1. "Bring on the Night" Released: 30 October 2015; 2. "I Do What I Like" Released: 4 March 2016

White Light is the sixth studio album by The Corrs, released on 27 November 2015 in Europe, excluding German-speaking countries, and released on 12 February 2016 in German-speaking countries. Their first studio album in a decade, after 2005's Home, and their first of original material since 2004's Borrowed Heaven, the album marked their return to the music scene, peaking inside the top 10 in Hungary, Ireland and Switzerland and reaching the top 20 in 8 countries.

== Background ==
The Corrs returned to the studio in May 2015 after a ten-year hiatus from music. Sharon told Vibe Magazine that it was Caroline who initiated the sessions saying: "I think she had been thinking about it for a while." before going on to state that "We had never said never, we are a family, we hadn’t broken up – that would be way too serious and catastrophic. She rang us all and we were all open to it.” The sessions were not initially publicized, as Sharon explained that "We did it all in a very organic way, completely under the radar. We told nobody about it and we just went into a studio in London. We all wrote stuff at home, brought it in and found out if we had any good ideas together. The magic was there immediately.”

From their first session, "Ellis Island" and "Strange Romance" began convincing the siblings that they were on to something. "Gerry's Reel" pays tribute to their father Gerry, who died during the production of the album at age 82. The Corrs performed together for the first time in 10 years at his funeral. "Bring On the Night" was also written about his death, and was inspired by Andrea reading a book that belonged to her father, hence the lyrics "I read the book you read, tasted the words you said". "White Light", the title track, came to life after Andrea went to see the documentary Amy, about singer Amy Winehouse who died from a drug overdose at the age of 27. A lyric on the song is inspired by a Tony Bennett quote from the film: "You've got to live long enough to learn how to live."

Jim told Magic Radio that he believed this album was "probably the best album we've ever done. We are really proud of it and hope the fans love it just as much."

== Release and promotion ==
On 19 October 2015, the lead single "Bring on the Night" was premiered worldwide for the very first time on BBC Radio 2. The single was released as a digital download on 30 October 2015. The Corrs official YouTube channel uploaded a lyric video for the song on 30 October 2015. A music video was released on 11 November 2015.

The album debuted at number eleven on the UK Albums Chart, with 27,648 copies sold. On 1 January 2016, the album was certified Gold by the BPI for sales in excess of 100,000 copies.

A European tour in support of the album took place in 2016.

== Critical reception ==
Professional ratings
Review scores
Source	Rating
AllMusic	4/5 stars
RTÉ.ie	2/5 stars
London Evening Standard	3/5 stars
The Times	2/5 stars
The Arts Desk	3/5 stars
The Irish Times	2/5 stars

White Light has received mixed reviews from critics. Neil Yeung of AllMusic rated 4/5 stars for the album, stating that "this collection sounds like they picked up immediately after their last album and not a return to the scene after a decade."

== Track listing ==
All tracks are written by The Corrs, with additional co-writing on "Kiss of Life" by John Shanks and Natasha Bedingfield; and "Unconditional" by Shanks and Ruth-Anne Cunningham.

No.	Title	Producer(s)	Length
1.	"I Do What I Like"	John Shanks	3:36
2.	"Bring On the Night"	Shanks	4:16
3.	"White Light"	Shanks	3:15
4.	"Kiss of Life"	Shanks	3:58
5.	"Unconditional"	Shanks	3:54
6.	"Strange Romance"	Shanks	3:40
7.	"Ellis Island"	The Corrs; Chris Young	5:03
8.	"Gerry's Reel" (instrumental)	The Corrs; Young	3:20
9.	"Stay"	Shanks	3:08
10.	"Catch Me When I Fall"	Shanks	5:28
11.	"Harmony"	The Corrs; Young	4:34
12.	"With Me Stay" (Acoustic version of "Stay")	The Corrs; Young	3:42

== Charts ==
=== Weekly charts ===
Chart (2015–16)	Peak position
Australian Albums (ARIA)	18
Austrian Albums (Ö3 Austria)	13
Belgian Albums (Ultratop Flanders)	32
Belgian Albums (Ultratop Wallonia)	28
Czech Albums (ČNS IFPI)	41
Dutch Albums (Album Top 100)	17
French Albums (SNEP)	28
German Albums (Offizielle Top 100)	11
Hungarian Albums (MAHASZ)	10
Irish Albums (IRMA)	10
Italian Albums (FIMI)	74
Japanese Albums (Oricon)	103
Scottish Albums (OCC)	9
Spanish Albums (Promusicae)	25
Swiss Albums (Schweizer Hitparade)	7
UK Albums (OCC)	11

=== Year-end charts ===
Chart (2015)	Position
Hungarian Albums (MAHASZ)	73
UK Albums (OCC)	63

== Certifications ==
Certifications for White Light
Region	Certification	Certified units/sales
United Kingdom (BPI)	Gold	100,000^{‡}
^{‡} Sales+streaming figures based on certification alone.
