= Caroline Corr =

Irish musician (born 1973)

Caroline Corr MBE
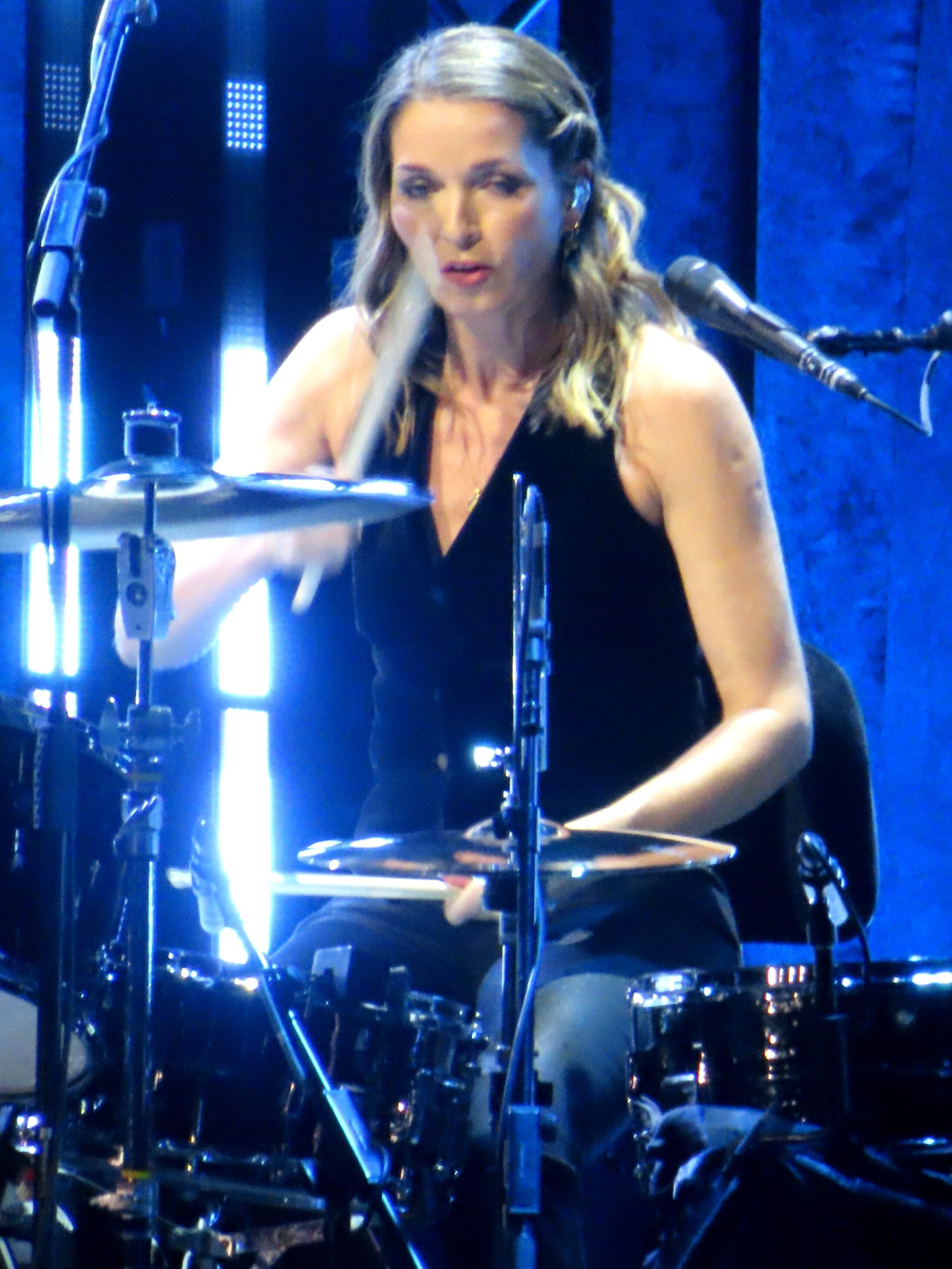
- Corr performing in 2024

Background information
- Born: Caroline Georgina Corr; 17 March 1973 (age 53)
- Origin: Dundalk, Louth, Ireland
- Genres: Pop; rock; Celtic
- Occupation: Musician
- Instruments: Drums; percussion; piano; vocals
- Years active: 1990–present
- Labels: 143; Lava; Atlantic; Warner Music Group
- Member of: The Corrs
- Spouse: Frank Woods (m. 2002; sep. 2020)

Caroline Georgina Corr (born 17 March 1973) is an Irish singer and drummer for the Celtic folk rock band the Corrs. In addition to the drums, she plays the bodhrán, cajón, percussions and piano.

The Corr siblings were appointed honorary MBEs in 2005, in recognition of their music and charitable work, which has raised money for the Freeman Hospital in Newcastle upon Tyne, victims of the Omagh Bombing and other charities.

== Early life ==
Corr was born on 17 March, 1973 (Saint Patrick's Day) in Dundalk, Ireland, to Jean and Gerry Corr. Corr has four siblings: an older sister Sharon Corr, older brother Jim Corr and a younger sister Andrea Corr. Their older brother Gerard was killed when he was three years old in a road accident before she and her sister Andrea were born. Caroline was brought up in a Catholic household and was sent to the same school, Dun Lughaidh Convent, as her sisters.

Her parents played ballads and folk tunes in local bands, and formed their own band called "Sound Affair". Jean sang and Gerry played the keyboards and they performed covers of songs by various famous bands. Caroline and her siblings were exposed to music from a very young age, and travelled with Jean and Gerry to gigs in the family car.

Caroline was taught the piano by her father Gerry at a very early age like her other siblings. She also learnt the bodhrán by watching videos of traditional Irish musicians playing it. The violin was originally intended for Caroline to play but she showed no interest and instead Sharon took up the violin lessons. Caroline learned how to play the drums with the help of a former boyfriend who gave her the lessons. From then on, her drum skills were self taught.

She performed No Frontiers, a cover of a Jimmy MacCarthy song, on The Corrs Unplugged along with her sister Sharon.

In 2020, Corr was part of an Irish collective of female singers and musicians called "Irish Women in Harmony", that recorded a version of Dreams in aid of the charity SafeIreland, which deals with domestic abuse which had reportedly risen significantly during the COVID-19 lockdown.

== Career ==
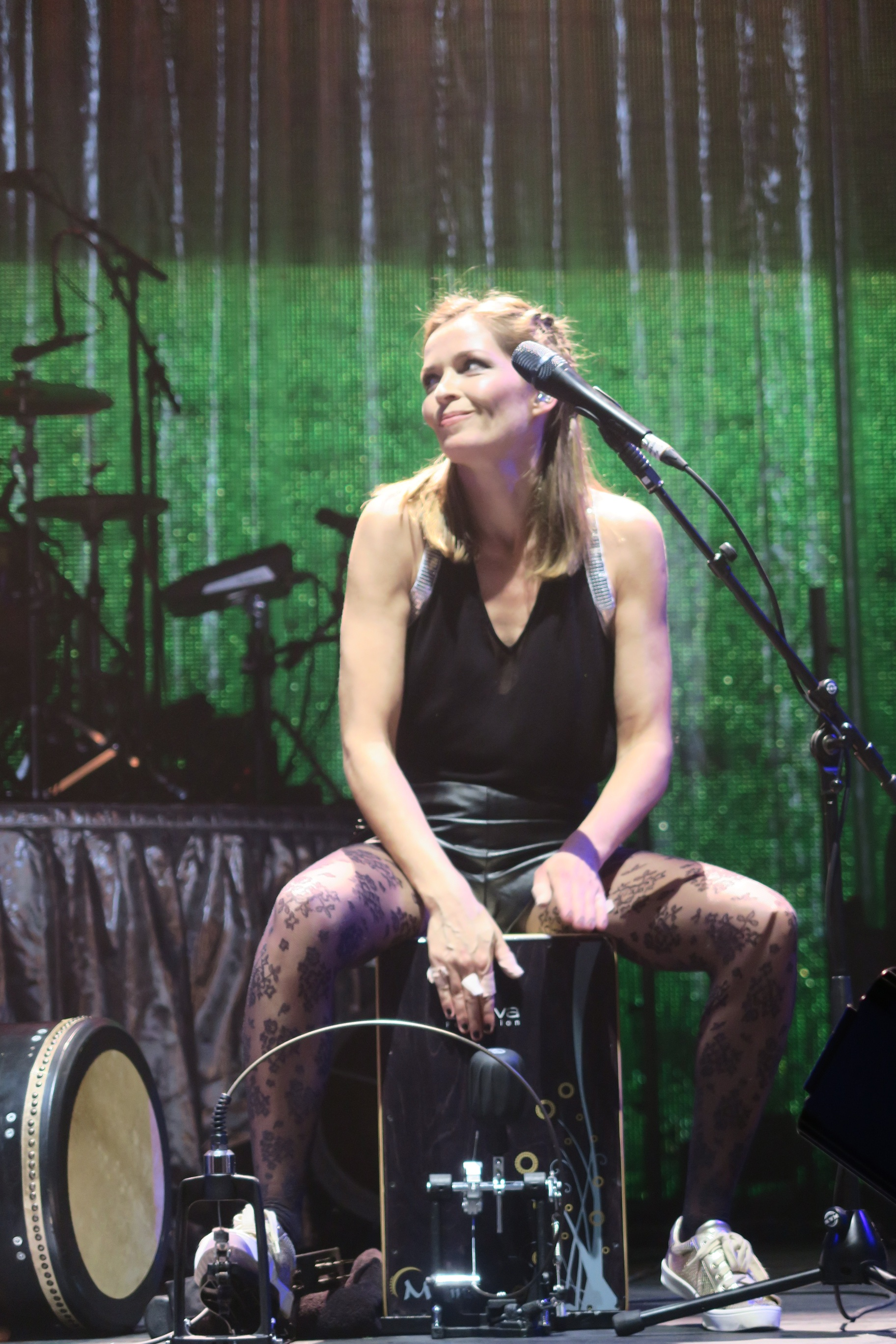
Caroline Corr performing part of the acoustic set of the White Light tour at London's O2 Arena on 23 January 2016. Caroline played the Cajon during this part of the set list.

== Personal life ==
Corr married Frank Woods, a property developer and boyfriend of many years, on 22 August 2002, in Mallorca, Spain. Their first child, a son, was born on 12 February 2003. The couple's first daughter was born on 11 October 2004. This led to Corr taking some time off from the band's activities. On 1 December 2006 a second daughter was born. The couple separated in October 2020.

== Honours and awards ==
In April 2002, she was awarded the Rory Gallagher Musician Award at the Hot Press Irish Music Awards held at held at the BBC's Blackstaff studios in Belfast.

== Discography ==
=== Albums ===
- 1995: Forgiven Not Forgotten
- 1997: Talk on Corners
- 2000: In Blue
- 2004: Borrowed Heaven
- 2005: Home
- 2015: White Light
- 2017: Jupiter Calling

=== Compilations and remix albums ===
- 2001: Best of The Corrs
- 2006: Dreams: The Ultimate Corrs Collection
- 2007: The Works

=== Live albums ===
- 1997: The Corrs - Live
- 1999: The Corrs Unplugged
- 2002: VH1 Presents: The Corrs, Live in Dublin
