= Keith Duffy (bassist) =

Irish bass guitarist (born 1966)

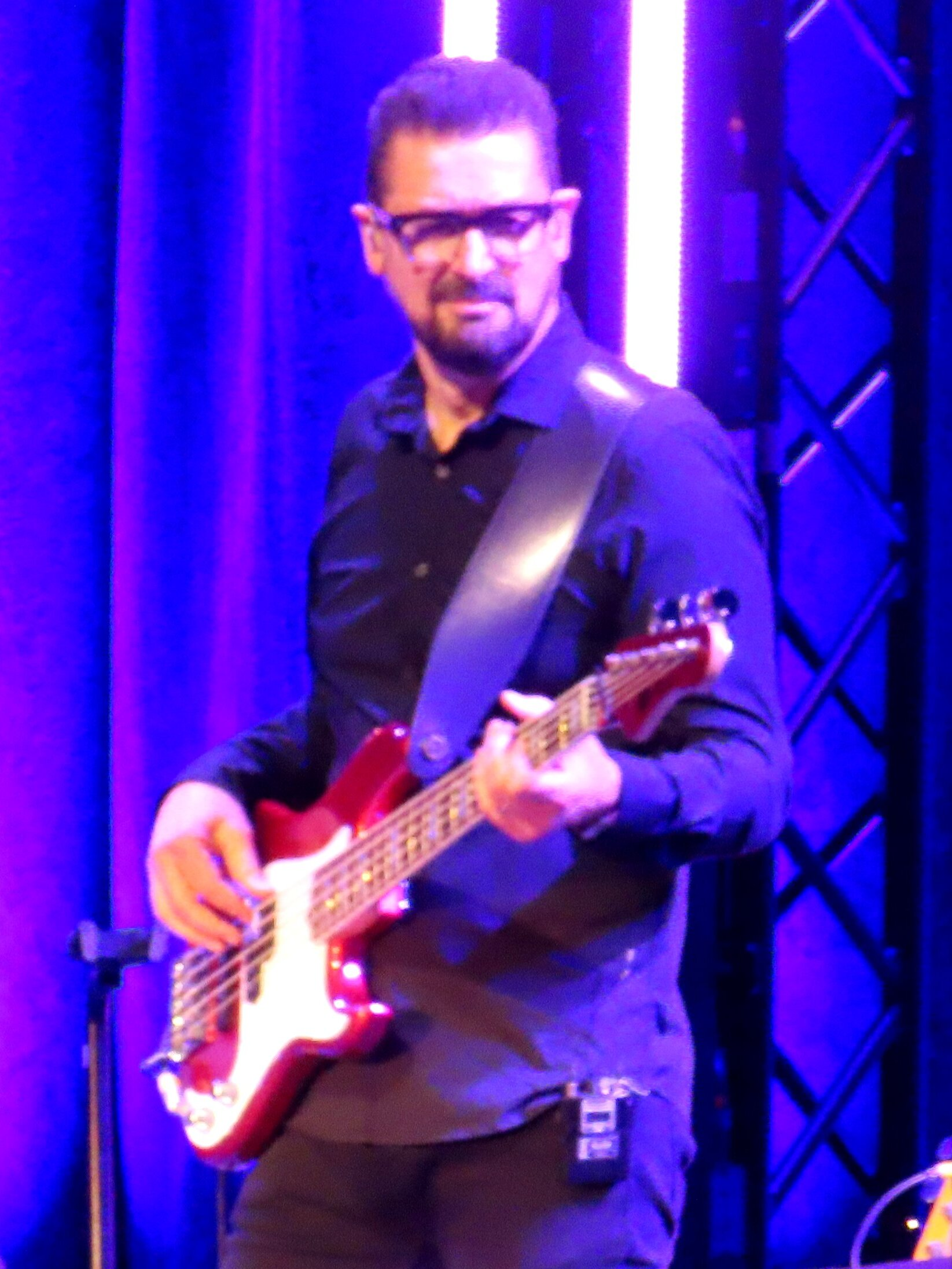
Duffy with The Corrs in 2024

Keith Arnold Jacques Duffy (born 2 June 1966) is an Irish bass guitarist, best known for his long-standing support role in the folk-pop band The Corrs.

Duffy was born in Drogheda, County Louth. From 1990, he played bass with Commitments star Andrew Strong for four years and then toured with The Commitments Band for a year, before getting a call from Corrs manager John Hughes in 1995. He has accompanied The Corrs on all of their tours ever since and played on many of their studio recordings.

He also recorded bass on Bernard Fanning's (of Powderfinger) solo album Tea & Sympathy in 2006.
