= Sharon Corr =

Sharon Corr MBE
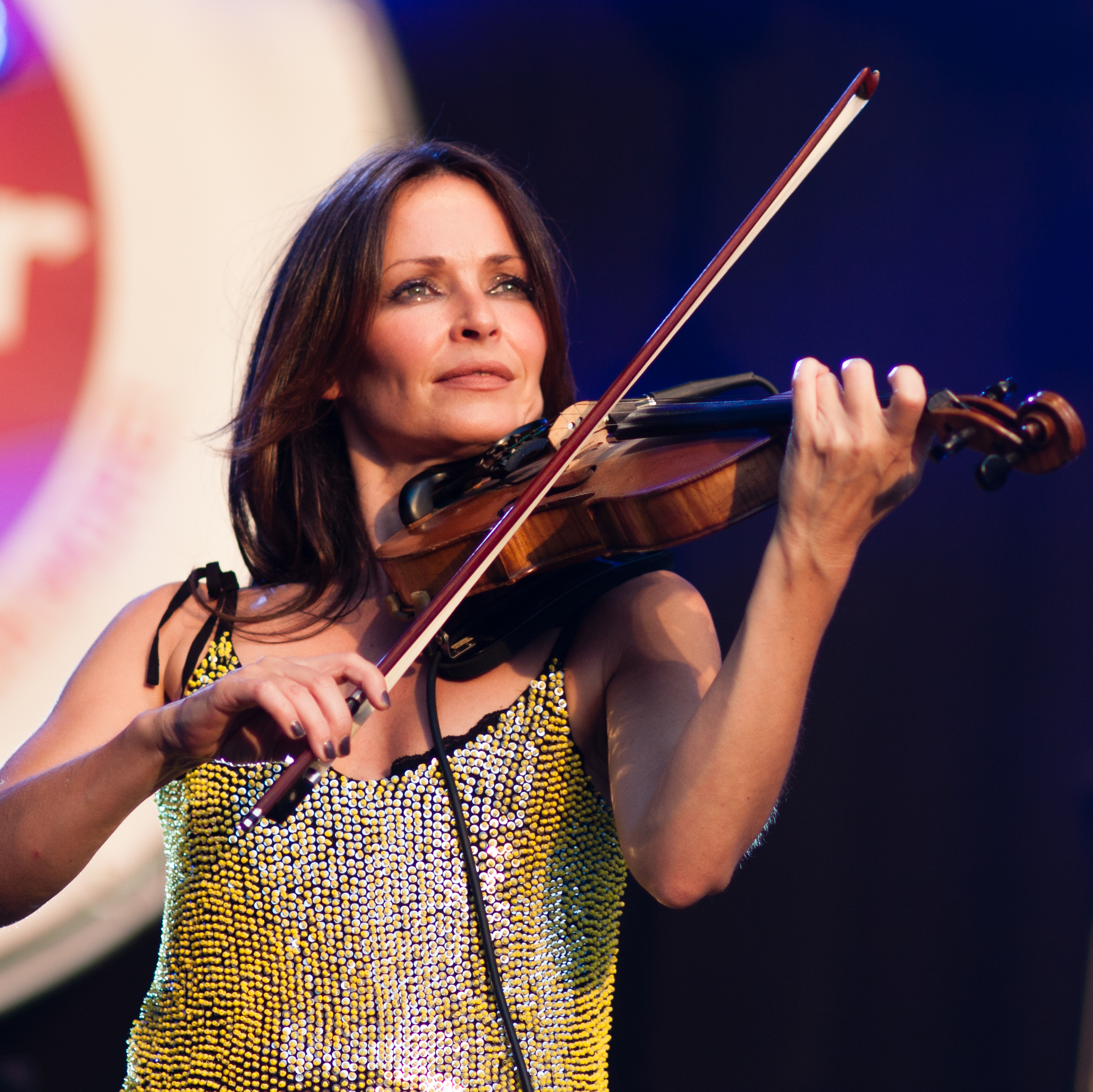
- Corr performing in 2012

Background information
- Born: Sharon Helga Corr; 24 March 1970 (age 56)
- Origin: Dundalk, Louth, Ireland
- Genres: Pop; rock; celtic
- Occupations: Musician; television personality
- Instruments: Violin; vocals; piano; guitar
- Years active: 1990–present
- Labels: Rhino; Warner Bros.
- Member of: The Corrs
- Spouse: Robert Gavin Bonnar (m. 2001; sep. 2019)
- Website: sharoncorr.com

Sharon Helga Corr (born 24 March 1970) is an Irish singer-songwriter, musician, and television personality. She is best known as a member of the pop-rock band the Corrs, which she co-founded in 1990 with her elder brother Jim and younger sisters Caroline and Andrea. She plays the violin, piano and guitar, and sings backing vocals. She began learning the violin when she was six years old. She has played in national youth orchestras and is qualified to teach the violin.

The Corr siblings were appointed honorary MBEs in 2005 by Queen Elizabeth II in recognition of both their musical talent and their charitable work raising money for the Freeman Hospital in Newcastle upon Tyne, victims of the Omagh Bombing, and other charities. On 22 March 2019, Corr was awarded an honorary doctorate (DUniv) by the Open University, in recognition of her "exceptional contribution to education and culture". The ceremony took place at the Barbican Centre, London.

In 2012, Corr was revealed as one of the coaches on the first series of the RTÉ talent show The Voice of Ireland.

== Career ==
=== 2009–2012: Dream of You ===
In July 2009, Corr was voted into first place in the Ms Twitter UK competition.

On 15 July 2009, Corr appeared on This Morning, having been booked by host Phillip Schofield via Twitter, to confirm the release of a new solo single and album. Her début single, "It's Not a Dream", was released on 29 August in Ireland and 31 August in the UK, with appearances at Isle of Wight, Glastonbury, and a number of other European music festivals. The album, Dream of You, was released on 13 September 2010 and comprises a number of self-penned tracks and select covers with Corr playing violin throughout. She was joined by longtime Corrs' sidemen Anthony (Anto) Drennan on lead guitar, Keith Duffy on bass, and Jason Duffy on drums, with orchestral arrangements by Fiachra Trench, a collaborator on four Corrs' albums.

Corr embarked on the Dream of You Tour on 19 August 2011 in Aberdeen and continued through the UK and Europe, with an Australian leg added in January 2012. While on the tour she introduced a newly written track, "Edge of Nowhere", which will be included on her second album.

=== 2012–present: The Voice of Ireland, The Same Sun and The Fool and the Scorpion ===
Corr was a coach on the first and second series of the RTÉ talent show The Voice of Ireland.

In an interview with the Maitland Mercury in February 2012, Corr revealed that she is piecing together her second solo record.

Corr finished writing the album in March 2012 and she said it may be called Catch the Moon. The title comes from the idea "of when somebody comes into your life and they utterly change yours, that you would go to any lengths for them... so you would catch the moon." However, on 21 August 2013 it was announced that the new album would be titled The Same Sun. The lead single from the album, "Take a Minute", peaked at No. 11 on the Irish charts and No. 20 in the France charts. Corr also embarked on The Same Sun Tour in late 2013, touring in The Netherlands, Germany, Brazil, and Indonesia. She performed in Indonesia at Jakarta Convention Center (JCC), Jakarta, Indonesia, on 24 September 2013 (WIB) as a special guest. She was also joined on tour by Yovie Widianto who was a special guest in Madrid, Spain, in November 2013. The tour continued throughout the United States during January and February 2014.

In 2015, The Corrs reunited, releasing the albums White Light. That album was followed up by Jupiter Calling in 2017.

Sharon released her third solo album, The Fool and the Scorpion on 24 September 2021. Promo for this album started in May with the announcement of a solo residency at Sala Clamores in Madrid, Spain. In May and June 2022, Sharon will embark on a UK tour supporting Jeff Beck, following her Spain and France gigs in January 2022.

== Personal life ==
In 2001, Corr married Belfast barrister Robert Gavin Bonnar in Cratloe Church, County Clare. They had their first child in 2006, and a daughter in 2007. The couple divorced in 2019.

After having children, she battled with social anxiety disorder and wrote about her anxiety problems on her solo album.

== Other recordings ==
As well as "No Frontiers" with Caroline Corr, Sharon sings "Dimming of the Day" and the demo version of "Goodbye". In 1999 she recorded violin parts for the Jean-Michel Jarre track "Rendez-vous à Paris", which was released in 2000 on the album Métamorphoses.

She also recorded two tracks in 2008 with the Welsh operatic singer Bryn Terfel, and "Amarrado a Ti" with the Spanish singer Alex Ubago in 2009.

== Discography ==
=== Studio albums ===
| Title | Album details | Peak chart positions | | | | | |
| Title | Album details | IRE | AUS | FRA | NZ | SPA | UK |
|---|---|---|---|---|---|---|---|
| Dream of You | Released: 13 September 2010; Label: Rhino; Formats: CD, digital download | 22 | 67 | 100 | 15 | 67 | 37 |
| The Same Sun | Released: 16 September 2013; Label: BobbyJean; Formats: CD, digital download | — | — | — | — | — | 104 |
| The Fool and the Scorpion | Released: 24 September 2021; Label: EastWest; Formats: CD, vinyl, digital download | — | — | — | — | 55 | — |

=== Singles ===
| Year | Single | Peak chart positions | | Album |
| Year | Single | IRE | UK | Album |
|---|---|---|---|---|
| 2009 | "Me and My Teddy Bear" | — | — | Bandaged Together |
| 2009 | "It's Not a Dream" | 29 | 167 | Dream of You |
| 2010 | "Everybody's Got to Learn Sometime" | — | — | Dream of You |
| 2010 | "So Long Ago" | — | — | Dream of You |
| 2011 | "Over It" | — | — | Dream of You |
| 2013 | "Take a Minute" | 11 | — | The Same Sun |
| 2014 | "We Could Be Lovers" | — | — | The Same Sun |
| 2021 | "The Fool and the Scorpion" | — | — | The Fool and the Scorpion |

=== Guest appearances ===
- 1999: "Rendez-vous à Paris" (Jean-Michel Jarre)
- 2008: "First Love – Songs from the British Isles" (Bryn Terfel)
- 2009: "Amarrado a Tí" (Alex Ubago)
- 2015: "Black Is the Colour" (Damien Leith)
- 2022: "A Christmas Childhood" (Patrick Kavanagh)
- 2023: "Go With The Flow" (The High Kings)
