= Jim Corr =

Irish musician (born 1964)

Jim Corr MBE
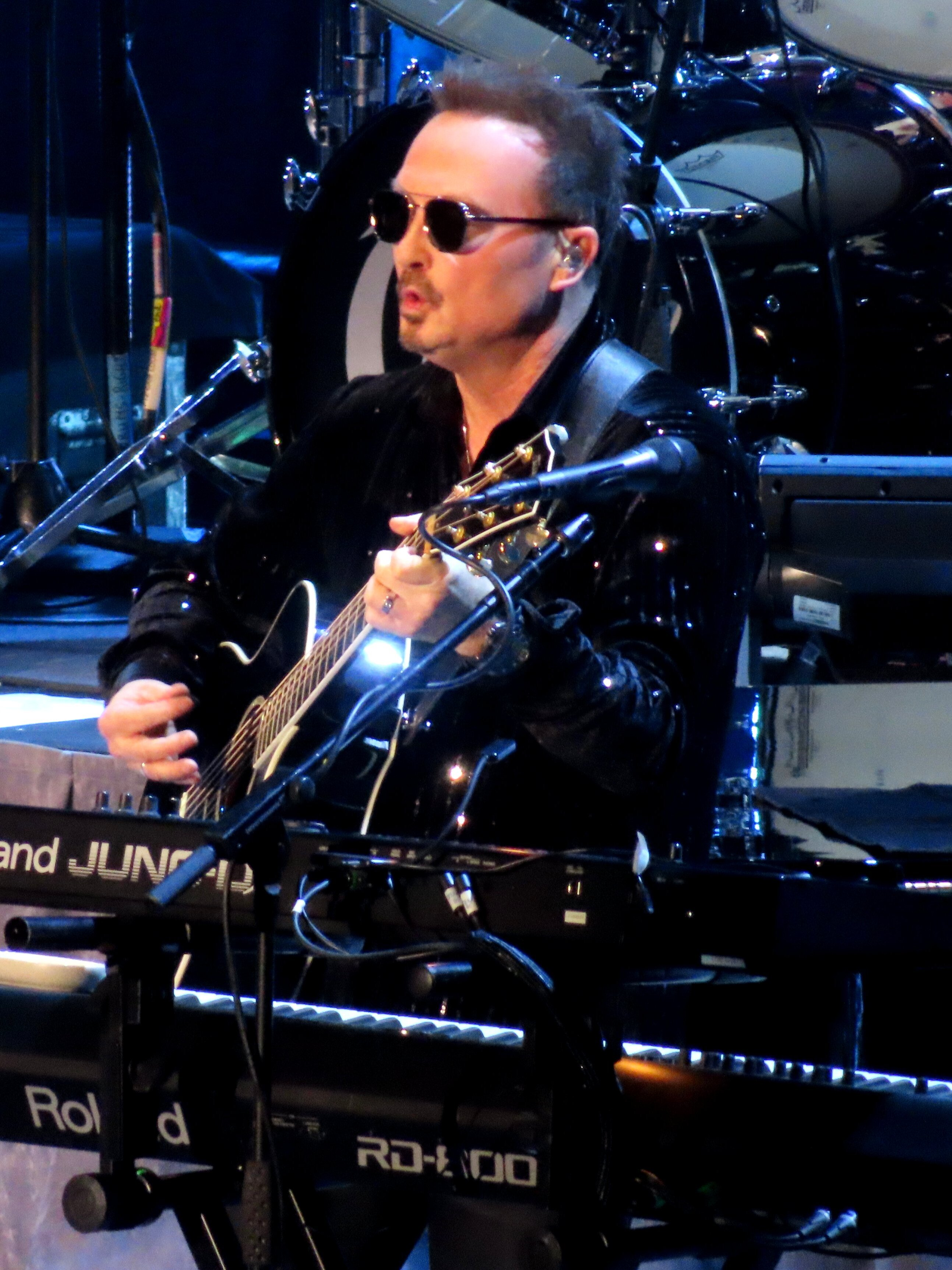
- Jim Corr in 2024

Background information
- Born: James Corr; 31 July 1964 (age 62)
- Origin: Dundalk, Louth, Ireland
- Genres: Rock; Celtic; pop
- Occupations: Musician; singer-songwriter
- Instruments: Guitar; keyboards; piano; mandolin; accordion; vocals
- Years active: 1991–present
- Member of: The Corrs
- Website: jimcorr.com

James Corr (born 31 July 1964) is an Irish musician, singer, songwriter and DJ. He is a member of the Irish folk/rock band the Corrs, the other members being his three younger sisters Andrea, Sharon and Caroline.

== Musical career ==
Corr first took guitar lessons in his hometown of Dundalk, a large industrial town in County Louth. Corr plays acoustic and electric guitar as well as piano, keyboard, accordion and singing background vocals. He has also had an active role in the production aspects of all of The Corrs' albums to date, working with David Foster and Olle Romo on two separate albums.

== Charity work and recognition ==
The Corr siblings were appointed as honorary MBEs in 2005 by Queen Elizabeth II, in recognition of their musical talents and also their charitable work which raised money for Freeman Hospital in Newcastle (where their mother was treated), victims of the Omagh Bombing, The Prince's Trust, and other charities.

Jim and his sisters were also involved in the Live 8 series of concerts, performing at Edinburgh in mid-2005 alongside Bono and other acts such as Annie Lennox, Eddie Izzard and Bob Geldof. He also performed at Nelson Mandela's 46664 concert in South Africa, to help raise awareness of the growing AIDS epidemic in Africa.

== Personal views ==
Corr is a member of the 9/11 Truth Movement and operated a website on which he writes about the New World Order, including the notion that 11 September 2001, was an inside job. Following the death of Osama bin Laden in May 2011, Corr maintained that bin Laden had actually died in 2001. At some point in September 2015, all conspiracy related content was removed from his site and the URL began to redirect to the main Corrs website.

Corr opposed lifting Ireland's constitutional ban on abortion in the 2018 Repeal the Eighth referendum.

In 2020, Corr posted on social media that he had attended an anti-lockdown and anti-mask protest during the COVID-19 pandemic organised by groups known as Health Freedom Ireland and Yellow Vests Ireland.

== Personal life ==
Corr has a son with ex-fiancée Gayle Williamson, a former Miss Northern Ireland.
