= Borrowed Heaven tour =

2004 concert tour by the Corrs

Borrowed Heaven Tour
- Tour by The Corrs
- Promotional poster for the tour
- Location: Europe; North America
- Associated album: Borrowed Heaven
- Start date: 19 June 2004
- End date: 27 November 2004
- Legs: 3
- No. of shows: 69

The Corrs concert chronology
- In Blue Tour (2000–01); Borrowed Heaven Tour (2004); The Corrs: In Concert (2004–05)

The Borrowed Heaven Tour is the fourth concert tour by Irish band, The Corrs, Beginning summer 2004, the tour promoted the band's fourth studio album, Borrowed Heaven. With nearly 70 shows, the tour visited Europe and North America. It marks the first headlining tour for the band in North America. It also serves as the last headlining tour before the band went into hiatus.

Two new members joined the group during the tour – Jason Duffy on drums and Kieran Kiely on keyboards. Jason Duffy joined the band after Caroline Corr announced her pregnancy and was unable to cross the Atlantic Ocean for the North American leg. Caroline was moved to percussion which would be easier for her as the months progressed.

The 26 November 2004 show at the SEG Geneva Arena in Geneva, Switzerland was filmed and released on 13 December 2005. It was titled, "All the Way Home: A History of the Corrs (plus Live in Geneva)". The film contains a documentary on the history of the band along with the full concert from Geneva.

== Opening acts ==
- Sheryl Crow (Killarney)
- Sophie B. Hawkins (6–21 August 2004)
- Myslovitz (11 October–8 November 2004)
- Tamee Harrison (Vienna)
- Serena Ryder (Toronto)

== Set list ==
The following set list was obtained from 30 August 2004 concert, held at the Theatre at the Air Canada Centre in Toronto, Canada. It does not represent all concerts during the tour.

1. "Instrumental Sequence" (contains elements of "Baby Be Brave")
2. "Humdrum"
3. "Only When I Sleep"
4. "Dreams"
5. "What Can I Do"
6. "Forgiven, Not Forgotten"
7. "Angel"
8. "Runaway"
9. "Instrumental Sequence" (contains elements of "Return from Fingal" and "Trout in a Bath")
10. "Borrowed Heaven"
11. "No Frontiers"
12. "Queen of Hollywood"
13. "Long Night"
14. "Old Town"
15. "When the Stars Go Blue"
16. "Radio"
17. "Summer Sunshine"
18. "So Young"
19. "I Never Loved You Anyway"
20. "Goodbye"

Encore

21. "Breathless"
22. "Toss the Feathers"

== Tour dates ==
List of 2004 concerts
Date	City	Country	Venue
19 June 2004	Bonn	Germany	Bonner Museumsplatz
20 June 2004^{[A]}	Werchter	Belgium	Werchter Festival Grounds
21 June 2004	London	England	Carling Apollo Hammersmith
23 June 2004	Belfast	Northern Ireland	Odyssey Arena
24 June 2004	Belfast	Northern Ireland	Odyssey Arena
26 June 2004^{[B]}	Killarney	Ireland	Fitzgerald Stadium
28 June 2004	Dublin	Ireland	Point Theatre
29 June 2004	Dublin	Ireland	Point Theatre
2 July 2004	Vienna	Austria	Schloss Schönbrunn
5 July 2004	Genoa	Italy	Piazza del Mare
6 July 2004^{[C]}	Locarno	Switzerland	Piazza Grande
8 July 2004^{[D]}	Montreux	Switzerland	Auditorium Stravinski
10 July 2004	Paris	France	Zénith de Paris
11 July 2004^{[E]}	London	England	Hyde Park
12 July 2004^{[F]}	Liverpool	England	Big Top Arena
15 July 2004	Madrid	Spain	Auditorio el Torreón
16 July 2004	Braga	Portugal	Estádio Municipal de Braga
17 July 2004^{[G]}	Santiago de Compostela	Spain	Auditorio Monte do Gozo
19 July 2004	Benidorm	Spain	Plaza Toros de Benidorm
21 July 2004	Palma	Spain	Plaza de toros de Palma de Mallorca
2 August 2004	New York	United States	China Club
5 August 2004	Vancouver	Canada	Rogers Arena
6 August 2004	Woodinville	United States	Chateau Ste. Michelle Amphitheatre
8 August 2004	Portland	United States	Roseland Theater
11 August 2004	San Francisco	United States	Warfield Theatre
12 August 2004	Saratoga	United States	Mountain Winery Amphitheatre
14 August 2004	Hollywood	United States	Kodak Theatre
15 August 2004	San Diego	United States	Humphrey's Concerts by the Bay
17 August 2004	Denver	United States	Universal Lending Pavilion
19 August 2004^{[H]}	Highland Park	United States	Ravina Pavilion
21 August 2004	Cleveland	United States	Tower City Amphitheater
22 August 2004	Pittsburgh	United States	Chevrolet Amphitheatre
25 August 2004	Vienna	United States	Filene Center
27 August 2004	Wantagh	United States	Tommy Hilfiger at Jones Beach Theater
28 August 2004	Boston	United States	FleetBoston Pavilion
30 August 2004	Toronto	Canada	Theatre at the Air Canada Centre
11 September 2004^{[I]}	London	England	Hyde Park
8 October 2004	Brighton	England	Brighton Centre
9 October 2004	Douai	France	Gayant Expo
11 October 2004	Paris	France	Palais Omnisports de Paris-Bercy
12 October 2004	Lyon	France	Halle Tony Garnier
14 October 2004	Metz	France	Galaxie Amnéville
16 October 004	Brussels	Belgium	Forest National
17 October 2004	Oberhausen	Germany	König Pilsener Arena
19 October 2004	Rotterdam	Netherlands	Ahoy
20 October 2004	Hanover	Germany	Stadionsporthalle
22 October 2004	Hamburg	Germany	Colour Line Arena
23 October 2004	Berlin	Germany	Max-Schmeling-Halle
25 October 2004	Stuttgart	Germany	Hanns-Martin-Schleyer-Halle
26 October 2004	Frankfurt	Germany	Festhalle Frankfurt
28 October 2004	Munich	Germany	Olympiahalle
30 October 2004	Rotterdam	Netherlands	Ahoy
1 November 2004	Newcastle	England	Metro Radio Arena
2 November 2004	Glasgow	Scotland	Scottish Exhibition and Conference Centre
4 November 2004	Sheffield	England	Hallam FM Arena
5 November 2004	Birmingham	England	NEC Arena
7 November 2004	Manchester	England	Manchester Evening News Arena
8 November 2004	London	England	Wembley Arena
10 November 2004	Cournon-d'Auvergne	France	Zénith d'Auvergne
13 November 2004	Barakaldo	Spain	Bizkaia Arena
16 November 2004	Lisbon	Portugal	Pavilhão Atlântico
18 November 2004	Seville	Spain	Auditorio Municipal Rocío Jurado de Sevilla
19 November 2004	Murcia	Spain	Plaza de toros de La Condomina
21 November 2004	Pamplona	Spain	Recinto Plan Sur
22 November 2004	Toulouse	France	Zénith de Toulouse
23 November 2004	Marseille	France	Le Dôme de Marseille
26 November 2004	Geneva	Switzerland	SEG Geneva Arena
27 November 2004^{[J]}	Ischgl	Austria	Silvrettaseilbahn AG

Festivals and other miscellaneous performances

^{A} TW Classic
^{B} Killarney Summerfest
^{C} Moon and Stars
^{D} Montreux Jazz Festival
^{E} 95.8 Capital FM's Party in the Park for the Prince's Trust
^{F} Liverpool Summer Pops
^{G} Festival de Musica Xacobeo
^{H} Ravinia Festival
^{I} BBC Proms in the Park
^{J} Top of the Mountain Concert

Cancellations and rescheduled shows

3 July 2004	Graz, Austria	Stadthalle Graz	Cancelled
2 August 2004	Edmonton, Canada	Francis Winspear Centre for Music	Cancelled
3 August 2004	Calgary, Canada	MacEwan Hall	Cancelled
8 August 2004	Portland, Oregon	Arlene Schnitzer Concert Hall	Moved to the Roseland Theater
24 August 2004	Portsmouth, Virginia	nTelos Wireless Pavilion	Cancelled
31 August 2004	London, Canada	Centennial Hall Auditorium	Cancelled
2 September 2004	Ottawa, Canada	Southam Hall	Cancelled
3 September 2004	Montreal, Canada	Salle Wilfrid-Pelletier	Cancelled
5 September 2004	Halifax, Canada	Halifax Metro Centre	Cancelled
8 September 2004	St. John's, Canada	Mile One Stadium	Cancelled

== Personnel ==
Band

- Andrea Corr (lead vocals, tin whistle)
- Caroline Corr (percussion, bodhran, piano, vocals)
- Jim Corr (guitars, keyboards, vocals)
- Sharon Corr (violin, vocals)
- Keith Duffy (bass)
- Anthony Drennan (lead guitar)
- Kieran Kiely (keyboards, accordion)
- Jason Duffy (drums)

Management

- John Hughes (band manager)
- Barry Gaster (business management)
- Caroline Henry (management assistant & band PA)

Crew

- Henry McGroggan (tour manager)
- Ian Calder (production manager)
- Nicola Calder (production assistant)
- Liam McCarthy (lighting designer)
- Max Bisgrove (Front of House sound)
- Paul Moore (monitor engineer)
- Declan Hogan (drum technician)
- David Vaughan (guitar technician)

Sound technicians

- George Breacker
- Jesse Godolphin
- Mike Nichiman

Lighting technicians

- Ray Whelan
- Richard Griffin
- Dave Prior
- Paul Prior

Stylists

- Jane Woolfenden (stylist)
- Carly Morris (wardrobe)

Tour promoters

- Peter Rieger Konzertagentur GmbH – Germany
- Clear Channel, Belgium – Belgium
- Rock & More – Austria
- Good News Productions & Montreux Jazz Festival – Switzerland
- Solo & CMP Entertament – United Kingdom
- Gamerco – Spain
- Fona Artist – Mallorca
- Rat des Villes – France
- CPE Music – Portugal
- Clear Channel, Italy – Italy
- Denis Desmond- Ireland
- Wonderland promoters – Northern Ireland

Instruments

- Yamaha Drums
- Zildjian Cymbals
- Roland Keyboards
- Barcus Berry Violins
- EBS Bass Amps
- Fender Guitars
