= VH1 Presents: The Corrs, Live in Dublin =

Live album by the Corrs
- Released: 12 March 2002
- Recorded: 25 January 2002
- Venue: Dublin, Ireland
- Genre: Pop rock; folk rock; Celtic
- Length: 45:25
- Label: 143; Lava; Atlantic
- Producer: Mitchell Froom

The Corrs chronology
| The Best of The Corrs (2001) | VH1 Presents: The Corrs, Live in Dublin (2002) | Borrowed Heaven (2004) |

Singles from VH1 Presents: The Corrs, Live in Dublin
- 1. "Would You Be Happier?" Released: 18 March 2002; 2. "When the Stars Go Blue" Released: 15 April 2002

Professional ratings
Review scores
| Source | Rating |
|---|---|
| AllMusic | 2.5/5 stars |

VH1 Presents: The Corrs, Live in Dublin is an album of live performances recorded by Irish pop rock band the Corrs in Dublin, Ireland, accompanied by the Irish Film Orchestra. The album features the Corrs performing previously released songs with slight remixes. Album highlights include two duets with Bono of U2 — performing Ryan Adams' "When the Stars Go Blue", and the Lee Hazlewood/Nancy Sinatra song "Summer Wine". The Corrs also performed Jimi Hendrix's "Little Wing", featuring a guitar solo by Ronnie Wood, who later also performed alongside them for the Rolling Stones song "Ruby Tuesday".

== Track listing ==
All tracks are written by the Corrs, except where noted.

| No. | Title | Writer(s) | Length |
|---|---|---|---|
| 1. | "Would You Be Happier?" | | 3:24 |
| 2. | "Breathless" | Andrea Corr; Sharon Corr; Caroline Corr; Jim Corr; Robert John "Mutt" Lange | 3:27 |
| 3. | "When the Stars Go Blue" (featuring Bono) | Ryan Adams | 4:19 |
| 4. | "Little Wing" (featuring Ronnie Wood) | Jimi Hendrix | 5:14 |
| 5. | "Joy of Life" (instrumental) | Traditional | 4:05 |
| 6. | "Runaway" | | 4:38 |
| 7. | "Only Love Can Break Your Heart" | Neil Young | 3:03 |
| 8. | "Radio" | | 4:50 |
| 9. | "Summer Wine" (featuring Bono) | Lee Hazlewood | 3:54 |
| 10. | "So Young" | | 4:52 |
| 11. | "Ruby Tuesday" (featuring Ronnie Wood) | Mick Jagger; Keith Richards | 3:39 |

== Charts and sales ==
| Chart | Country | Peak position | Sales/shipments |
|---|---|---|---|
| U.S Billboard 200 | United States | 52 | 400,000+ |
| U.S. Top Internet Albums | United States | 11 | 400,000+ |

- Worldwide sales: 400,000+
