= Bamses Venner =

Danish musical group

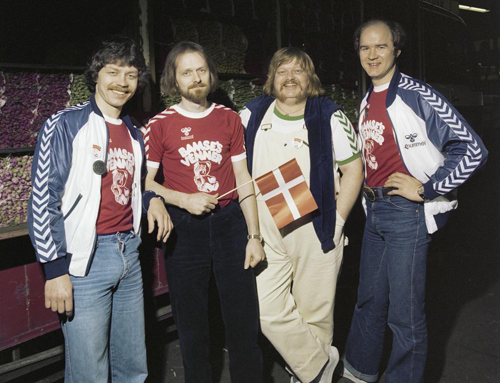
- Bamses Venner at the Eurovision Song Contest in 1980

Background information
- Origin: Aarhus, Denmark
- Genres: Rock, Pop
- Years active: 1973–2011
- Label: NM Music
- Website: www.bamsesvenner.dk

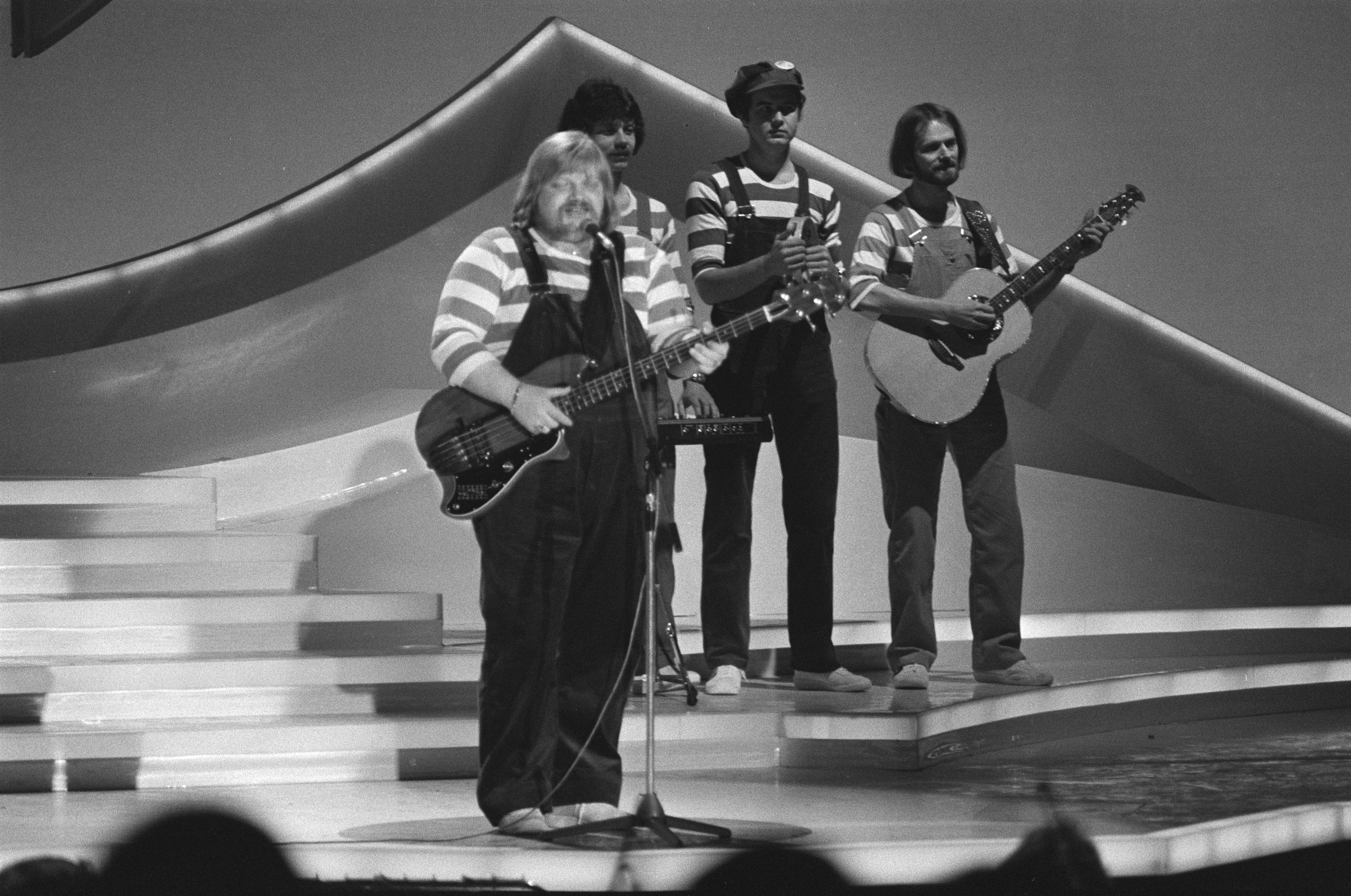
Bamses Venner at a rehearsal for the Eurovision Song Contest 1980

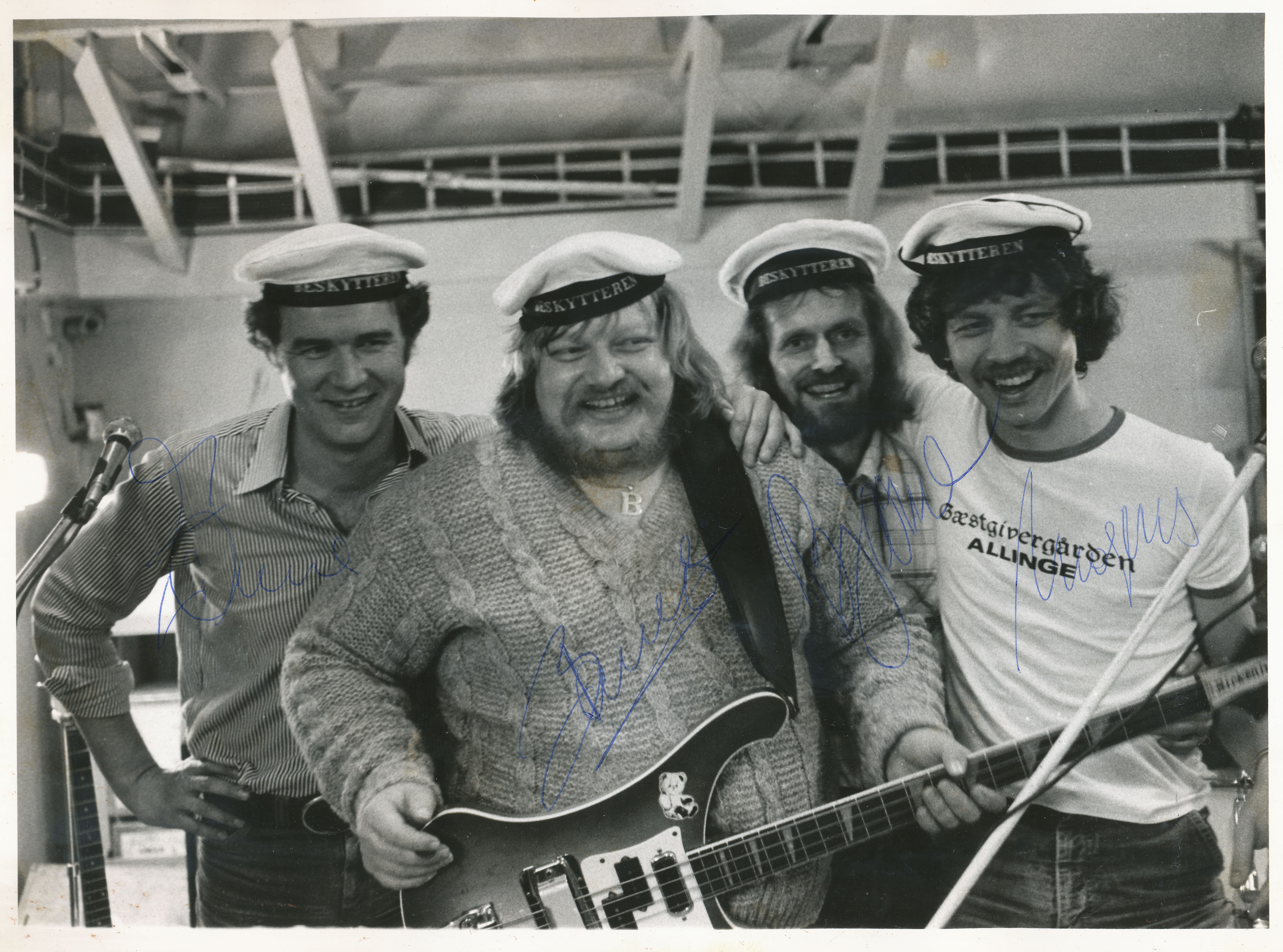
Bamses Venner in 1979. From left to right: Arne Østergaard, Flemming Bamse Jørgensen, Bjarne Gren Jensen, Mogens Balle.

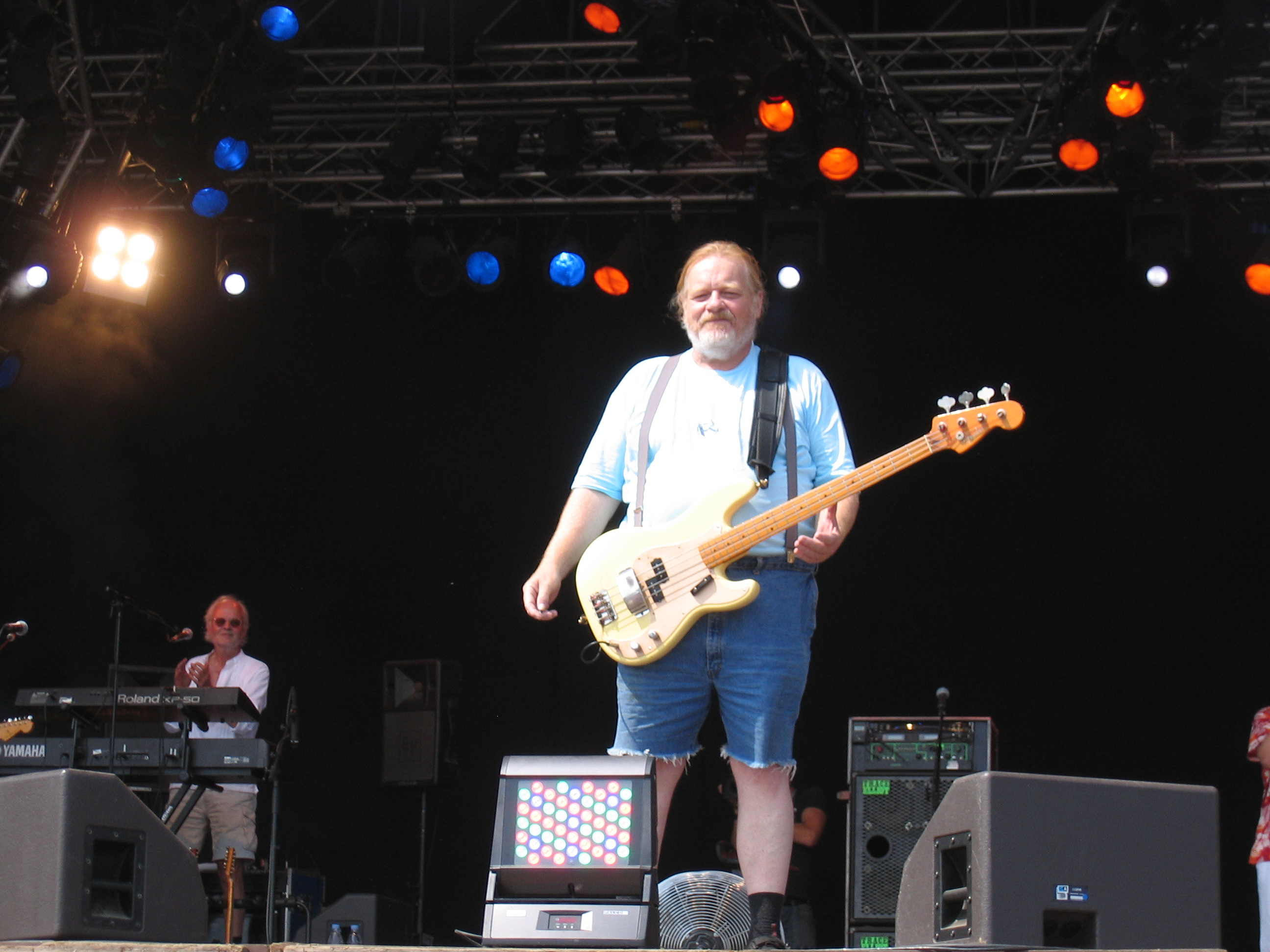
Flemming "Bamse" Jørgensen performing at Langelandsfestivalen, 2006

Bamses Venner (English: Teddy (Bear)'s Friends) was a Danish musical group that performed together from 1973 to 2011.

Bamses Venner represented Denmark in the Eurovision Song Contest 1980 with the entry "Tænker altid på dig" (ranked 14th in 19 countries) and received 25 points.

They also recorded "Er du langsom i nat" and "I en lille båd der gynger".

In 1980, the band was composed of Flemming Bamse Jørgensen, lead vocals and bass (nicknamed "Bamse" which means "Teddy Bear"), Mogens Balle (piano/organ), Bjarne Green (guitar), and Arne Østergaard (drums). As of 2004, the band consisted of Jørgensen (vocals, bass), Peter Bødker (piano/organ/guitar), Frank Thøgersen (drums), Torben Fausø (keyboards) and Jes Kerstein (guitar). Bamses Venner sang in Danish.

Jørgensen died on 1 January 2011 from a cardiac arrest. The rest of the band members have decided to break up after a series of planned memorial concerts.

== Members ==
- Bamse, (vocals, bass), 1973–2011
- Jes Halding, (Organ, Keyboards, vocals), 1973–1977
- Roar Odgaard, (Organ, Keyboards, vocals), 1973–1978
- Jan Locht, (drums, vocals), 1973–1978
- Bjarne Gren Jensen, (guitar, vocals), 1973–1981
- Mogens Balle, (Organ, Keyboards, vocals), 1979–1985
- Arne Østergaard, (drums, vocals), 1978–1985
- Frank Lorentzen, (guitar, vocals), 1982–1985
- Torben Fausø, (keyboards, vocals), 1985–2006
- Nelle Walther, (drums), 1985–1996
- Niels Krag, (guitar, vocals), 1985–1998
- John Halskov, (guitar, vocals), 1985–1998
- Frants Solgaard, (bass, guitar, vocals), 1985–1996
- Peter Bødker, (organ, piano, vocals), 1998–2011
- Frank Thøgersen, (drums, vocals), 1998–2011
- Per Zeeberg, (guitar, vocals), 1999–2001
- Thomas Wester, (guitar), 2001–2002
- Jes Kerstein, (guitar, vocals), 2002–2008
- Anders Lampe, (guitar, vocals), 2008–2011; died 2024

== Discography ==
=== Albums ===
- Bamses Venner (1975)
- Mælk og vin (1976)
- Sutsko! (1977)
- Din sang (1977)
- B & V (1978)
- Solen skinner (1979)
- Sådan set (1980)
- Bamse life I (1980)
- Bamse life II (1980)
- Spor 8 (1981)
- Har du lyst (1983)
- Op og ned (1985)
- Rockcreme (1986)
- Lige nu! (1987)
- 1988 (1988)
- En helt almindelig mand (1989)
- 16 (1990)
- Lyseblå dage (1991)
- Forår (1992)
- Vidt omkring... (1993)
- Vidt omkring (1993)
- Lidt for mig selv (1994)
- Jul på vimmersvej (1995)
- Drenge (1996)
- Mig og mine Venner (1998)
- Brødrene Mortensens jul (1998)
- Stand by me (1999)
- For altid (2000)
- Always on my mind (2001)

Year	Album	Peak positions	Certification
Year	Album	DEN	Certification
2003	Rolig nu	17	
2005	Be my guest		
2006	Kysser dem vi holder a'	4	
2009	Vi er levende lys (2 CDs)	3	

Compilation albums

Year	Album	Peak positions	Certification
Year	Album	DEN	Certification
2005	Komplet 1973–1981	2	
2006	Komplet 1982–1994	13	
2011	Komplet 1995–2010 – Bronzeboksen	26	
2013	40 af de fede	4	Gold

=== Singles ===
Year	Single	Peak positions	Album
Year	Single	DEN	Album
1975	"Vimmersvej"		
1980	"Tænker altid på dig"		
2006	"Klip i mit kørekort"	4	Kysser dem vi holder a'

Preceded by Tommy Seebach with Disco Tango	Denmark in the Eurovision Song Contest; 1980	Succeeded by Tommy Seebach & Debbie Cameron with Krøller eller ej
