= Flemming Jørgensen =

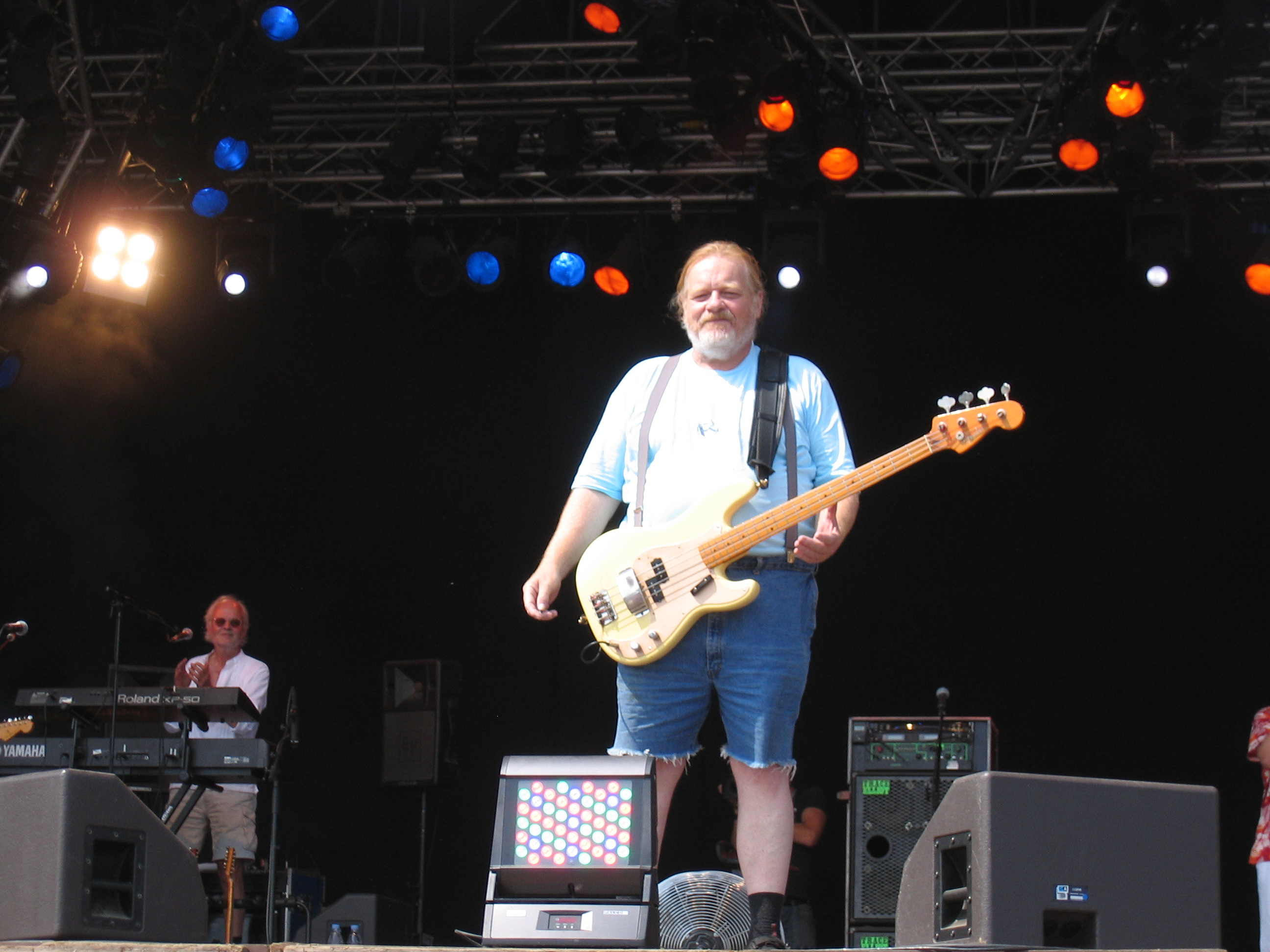
- Bamse performing at Langelandsfestivalen 2006

Background information
- Birth name: Flemming Duun Jørgensen
- Also known as: Bamse
- Born: 7 February 1947; Randers, Denmark
- Died: 1 January 2011 (aged 63); Egå, Denmark
- Genres: Pop music
- Occupation(s): Singer, songwriter, musician
- Instrument: Bass guitar
- Website: bamsesvenner.dk

Flemming "Bamse" Duun Jørgensen (7 February 1947 – 1 January 2011) was a Danish pop singer and actor, best known as lead singer of the band Bamses Venner (Teddy (Bear)'s Friends). During the recent years he also released some solo albums, the latest being Tæt på (Close-up) from 2010. Bamse was part of the Danish music scene for more than 35 years, and sold more than 3.5 million albums.

Flemming "Bamse" Jørgensen occasionally worked as an actor and in 1986 he received a Robert Award for best male supporting actor of the year in the movie Ofelia kommer til byen (Ophelia comes to town). Flemming "Bamse" Jørgensen died at age 63 in the early hours of New Year's Day 2011 of a cardiac arrest in his home in Egå, a suburb to Aarhus.

One of his first and biggest hits was Vimmersvej (originally "Wimmersvej") was from 1975 and it was based on The Lion Sleeps Tonight. On 13 September 2018, a road in Thisted named "Kronborgvejs Sidevej" was changed to "Vimmersvej".

== Discography ==
=== With Bamses Venner ===
Refer to discography at Bamses Venner

=== Solo ===
- Din sang (1977)
- Solen skinner (1979)
- Lige nu (1987)
- 1988 (1988)
- Lidt for mig selv (1994)
- Jul på Vimmersvej (1995)
- Stand By Me (1999)
- Always on My Mind (2001)
- Be My Guest (2005)
- Love Me Tender (2007)
- Tæt på (2010)
- De store og de gemte (2011)

Live

- Bamse Live I (1980)
- Bamse Live II (1980)
