= Would You Be Happier? =

2001 single by the Corrs

Single by the Corrs

from the album Best of The Corrs
- B-side: "The Long and Winding Road"
- Released: 1 October 2001
- Genre: Pop
- Length: 3:24
- Label: 143; Atlantic; Lava
- Songwriter: The Corrs
- Producers: The Corrs; Wayne Wilkins (co.)

The Corrs singles chronology
"All the Love in the World" (2001)	"Would You Be Happier?" (2001)	"Would You Be Happier?" (live) (2002)

"Would You Be Happier?" is a song by Irish band the Corrs, released as a single from their greatest hits album Best of The Corrs (2001). The song was first released in Australia on 1 October 2001 and was issued in Europe later the same month. The single reached number 10 in New Zealand and number 14 in the United Kingdom, becoming a top-40 hit in several other countries as well. In the United States, a live version of the track was released in March 2002 and charted within the Billboard Adult Contemporary top 40.

== Critical reception ==
Music & Media magazine named "Would You Be Happier?" their "Pick of the Week" on the 22 September 2001 issue, with Swedish music director Robert Jonsson saying of the track, "Quite often when you do a compilation with an extra song, the song is not that good, but this is." Billboard magazine reviewer Chuck Taylor described the song as a "meaty pop anthem" and preferred the studio version over the Mitchell Froom-produced radio version, believing the studio version was "fuller".

== Chart performance ==
In the band's native Ireland, the song first appeared at number 26 on the Irish Singles Chart on 25 October 2001, which would become its peak. On the UK Singles Chart, the song debuted and peaked at number 14 on 4 November and spent six weeks in the top 100. Across mainland Europe, it peaked at number 20 in the Netherlands and reached the top 40 in the Italy, Romania, and Switzerland. On Australia's ARIA Singles Chart, it spent a single week in the top 50, at number 47, on 28 October 2001. In neighbouring New Zealand, the track became the Corrs' fifth consecutive top-20 hit, as well as their last, when it attained a peak of number 10; it was their third consecutive single to spend exactly 16 weeks on the New Zealand Singles Chart. A live release of the track charted in the United States instead, making it to number 30 on the Billboard Adult Contemporary chart in May 2002.

== Music video ==
The song's music video begins with lead singer Andrea Corr singing in front of a makeup vanity. As she does, scenes of the Corrs attending a demographics meeting are shown, with two men presenting different logos of the band name to the four siblings. The band is then shown in makeup, where they put on rockstar wigs and receive temporary tattoos for their first performance, which takes place during the first chorus. The Corrs watch this recording on a television, amused. During the second verse, the band relaxes on a couch while eating popcorn. The clip the siblings watch next consists of a hip hop motif, featuring Andrea, drummer Caroline, and violinist Sharon modelling a bright red car. Guitarist Jim is dressed as a DJ for this part. Their final performance, taking place during the third verse, has a punk rock theme, with the band wearing mohawks and body piercings. The rock performance is eventually drowned in smoke, and the band trash their instruments from the punk rock set. They continue to watch these clips, throwing popcorn at each other. The video concludes with the band performing the original, casual style of "Would You Be Happier?", at which point the extras and directors applaud them.

== Track listings ==
UK and Australian CD single

1. "Would You Be Happier?" – 3:24
2. "Would You Be Happier?" (alternative mix) – 3:33
3. "The Long and Winding Road" (live) – 2:58

European CD single

1. "Would You Be Happier?" (album version) – 3:24
2. "Would You Be Happier?" (alternative mix) – 3:33

European maxi-CD single

1. "Would You Be Happier?" – 3:24
2. "Would You Be Happier?" (alternative mix) – 3:33
3. "The Long and Winding Road" (live) – 2:58
4. "Would You Be Happier?" (enhanced video)

== Personnel ==
Personnel are adapted from the European CD single liner notes.

The Corrs

- Andrea Corr – lead vocals, tin whistle
- Caroline Corr – drums, bodhrán, vocals
- Sharon Corr – violin, vocals
- Jim Corr – guitar, keyboard, vocals

Additional musicians

- Keith Duffy – bass

Writing and production

- The Corrs – writing, production
- Wayne Wilkins – co-production
- Adam Brown – engineering
- Andy Bradfield – mixing
- John Hughes – management

== Charts ==
Chart (2001–2002)	Peak position
Australia (ARIA)	47
Belgium (Ultratip Bubbling Under Flanders)	5
Belgium (Ultratip Bubbling Under Wallonia)	6
Denmark Airplay (Tracklisten)	5
Europe (Eurochart Hot 100)	40
France (SNEP)	61
Germany (GfK)	81
Ireland (IRMA)	26
Italy (FIMI)	25
Netherlands (Dutch Top 40)	20
Netherlands (Single Top 100)	39
New Zealand (Recorded Music NZ)	10
Romania (Romanian Top 100)	26
Scotland Singles (OCC)	11
Spain (AFYVE)	6
Sweden (Sverigetopplistan)	58
Switzerland (Schweizer Hitparade)	36
UK Singles (OCC)	14

== Release history ==
Region	Date	Format(s)	Label(s)	Ref.
Australia	1 October 2001	CD	143; Atlantic; Lava	
Ireland	October 2001	—N/a	143; Atlantic; Lava	
United Kingdom	29 October 2001	CD; cassette	143; Atlantic; Lava	

== Live version ==
"Would You Be Happier?" (live)

Single by the Corrs

from the album VH1 Presents: The Corrs, Live in Dublin
- Released: 18 March 2002
- Recorded: 25 January 2002
- Venue: Ardmore Studios (Bray, County Wicklow, Ireland)
- Length: 3:24
- Label: 143; Lava; Atlantic
- Songwriter: The Corrs
- Producer: Mitchell Froom

The Corrs singles chronology
"Would You Be Happier?" (2001)	"Would You Be Happier?" (live) (2002)	"When the Stars Go Blue" (2002)

On 25 January 2002, the Corrs recorded "Would You Be Happier?" for their album VH1 Presents: The Corrs, Live in Dublin (2002) at Ardmore Studios. This version was released as a single in United States and became a top-40 hit on the Billboard Adult Contemporary chart, peaking at number 30.

=== Music video ===
The video for "Would You Be Happier?" is pieced together from the session at VH1.

=== Credits and personnel ===
Credits are adapted from the US promo CD liner notes.

Studio

- Mastered at Gateway Mastering Studios (Portland, Maine, US)

Personnel

- The Corrs – writing
- Mitchell Froom – production
- Bob Ludwig – engineering
- Bob Clearmountain – mixing
- John Hughes – executive production
- Ron Shapiro – executive production
- Linda Ferrando – executive production

=== Charts ===
Chart (2002)	Peak position
US Adult Contemporary (Billboard)	30

=== Release history ===
Region	Date	Format(s)	Label(s)	Ref.
United States	18 March 2002	Adult contemporary radio	143; Lava; Atlantic	
United States	25 March 2002	Hot adult contemporary radio	143; Lava; Atlantic	
