= Forgiven, Not Forgotten World Tour =

1996–97 concert tour by the Corrs

- Tour by The Corrs
- Promotional poster for the tour
- Location: Asia; Europe; North America; Oceania
- Associated album: Forgiven, Not Forgotten
- Start date: 26 April 1996
- End date: 21 February 1997
- Legs: 6
- No. of shows: 89

The Corrs concert chronology
- Forgiven, Not Forgotten World Tour (1996–97); Talk on Corners World Tour (1997–99)

The Forgiven, Not Forgotten World Tour was the premiere international concert tour by Irish folk-rock band the Corrs. The tour was in-support of the band’s debut album, Forgiven, Not Forgotten. It began on 26 April 1996 in Ennis, Co. Clare, in Ireland, and concluded nearly ten months later in Launceston (Tasmania), Australia, on 21 February 1997.

Also during this period, the Corrs would tour with French Canadian singer Céline Dion, as her support act, during select portions of her Falling into You: Around the World Tour. The band had previously met Dion through their work with producer and songwriter David Foster, with whom Dion has worked extensively.

== Tour dates ==
List of 1996 concerts
| Date | City | Country | Venue |
|---|---|---|---|
| 26 April 1996 | Ennis | Ireland | West County Hotel |
| 27 April 1996 | Carlow | Ireland | Graiguecullen Bingo Hall |
| 28 April 1996 | Clonmel | Ireland | Regal Theatre |
| 29 April 1996 | Athlone | Ireland | ARTC Student Union |
| 1 May 1996 | Letterkenny | Ireland | Mount Errigal Hotel |
| 2 May 1996 | Sligo | Ireland | RTC Hall |
| 3 May 1996 | Cavan | Ireland | Carraig Springs |
| 4 May 1996 | Castlebar | Ireland | Traveller’s Friend Theatre |
| 4 May 1996 | Galway | Ireland | Leisureland |
| 8 May 1996 | Waterford | Ireland | Forum Waterford |
| 9 May 1996 | Belfast | Northern Ireland | Ulster Hall |
| 10 May 1996 | Limerick | Ireland | University Concert Hall |
| 11 May 1996 | Dublin | Ireland | National Stadium |
| 12 May 1996^{[A]} | Bantry | Ireland | Wolfe Tone Square |
| 14 May 1996 | London | England | Shepherd's Bush Empire |
| 16 May 1996 | Utrecht | Netherlands | Tivoli |
| 18 May 1996^{[B]} | Ringe | Denmark | Roskilde Dyrskueplads |
| 21 May 1996 | Stockholm | Sweden | Gino's |
| 22 May 1996 | Oslo | Norway | Rockefeller Music Hall |
| 26 May 1996 | Berlin | Germany | Universal |
| 27 May 1996 | Hamburg | Germany | Docks |
| 29 May 1996 | Zürich | Switzerland | Electric Ballroom |
| 31 May 1996 | Rome | Italy | Teatro Circo |
| 1 June 1996 | Valencia | Spain | Roxy Club |
| 3 June 1996 | Barcelona | Spain | Luz de Gas |
| 4 June 1996 | Madrid | Spain | Sala El Sol |
| 6 June 1996 | Paris | France | Bataclan |
| 8 June 1996^{[C]} | London | England | Finsbury Park |
| 14 June 1996 | Montreal | Canada | Café Campus |
| 15 June 1996 | Montreal | Canada | Bourbon Street West |
| 19 June 1996 | Halifax | Canada | Rebecca Cohn Auditorium |
| 7 July 1996 | Dublin | Ireland | Phoenix Park |
| 10 July 1996 | Tokyo | Japan | Club Quattro |
| 11 July 1996 | Tokyo | Japan | Club Quattro |
| 13 July 1996 | Osaka | Japan | Club Quattro |
| 14 July 1996 | Nagoya | Japan | Club Quattro |
| 16 July 1996 | Brisbane | Australia | QPAC Concert Hall |
| 17 July 1996 | Sydney | Australia | Enmore Theatre |
| 18 July 1996 | Sydney | Australia | Enmore Theatre |
| 20 July 1996 | Canberra | Australia | Royal Theatre |
| 22 July 1996 | Melbourne | Australia | Melbourne Concert Hall |
| 26 July 1996^{[D]} | Östersund | Sweden | Storsjöteatern |
| 27 July 1996^{[E]} | Rudkøbing | Denmark | Rue Mark |
| 3 August 1996 | Dranouter | Belgium | Festivalterrein |
| 4 August 1996 | Millstreet | Ireland | Green Glens Arena |
| 5 August 1996 | Lorient | France | Palais des Congrès à Lorient |
| 26 August 1996 | Dundalk | Ireland | Carrickdale Hotel |
| 27 August 1996 | Dundalk | Ireland | Carrickdale Hotel |
| 29 August 1996^{[H]} | Tralee | Ireland | Denny Street |
| 30 August 1996 | Cork | Ireland | Cork City Hall |
| 31 August 1996 | Castlebar | Ireland | Travellers Friend Theatre |
| 2 December 1996 | Carcassonne | France | Salle Chapeau Rogue |
| 3 December 1996 | Bordeaux | France | Théâtre Femina |
| 6 December 1996 | Nancy | France | Salle Poirel |
| 7 December 1996 | Villeurbanne | France | Le Transbordeur |
| 8 December 1996 | Paris | France | Bataclan |
| 10 December 1996 | Cologne | Germany | E-Werk |
| 11 December 1996 | Hamburg | Germany | Docks |
| 13 December 1996 | London | England | The Forum |
| 27 December 1996 | Galway | Ireland | Leisureland |
| 28 December 1996 | Belfast | Northern Ireland | Ulster Hall |
| 29 December 1996 | Belfast | Northern Ireland | Ulster Hall |
| 31 December 1996 | Dublin | Ireland | Point Theatre |

List of 1997 concerts
| Date | City | Country | Venue |
|---|---|---|---|
| 13 January 1997 | Cairns | Australia | Cairns Convention Centre |
| 14 January 1997 | Cairns | Australia | Cairns Convention Centre |
| 15 January 1997 | Townsville | Australia | Townsville Entertainment Centre |
| 17 January 1997 | Brisbane | Australia | Brisbane Entertainment Centre |
| 18 January 1997 | Newcastle | Australia | Newcastle Entertainment Centre |
| 20 January 1997 | Sydney | Australia | State Theatre |
| 21 January 1997 | Sydney | Australia | State Theatre |
| 22 January 1997 | Sydney | Australia | State Theatre |
| 23 January 1997 | Canberra | Australia | Royal Theatre |
| 25 January 1997 | Sydney | Australia | State Theatre |
| 26 January 1997 | Sydney | Australia | State Theatre |
| 27 January 1997 | Sydney | Australia | State Theatre |
| 29 January 1997 | Launceston | Australia | Princess Theatre |
| 30 January 1997 | Launceston | Australia | Princess Theatre |
| 31 January 1997 | Launceston | Australia | Princess Theatre |
| 1 February 1997 | Hobart | Australia | Derwent Entertainment Centre |
| 3 February 1997 | Melbourne | Australia | Palais Theatre |
| 4 February 1997 | Perth | Australia | Perth Entertainment Centre |
| 6 February 1997 | Adelaide | Australia | Adelaide Entertainment Centre |
| 7 February 1997 | Melbourne | Australia | Victoria Park |
| 8 February 1997 | Perth | Australia | Regal Theatre |
| 11 February 1997 | Brisbane | Australia | Brisbane Entertainment Centre |
| 12 February 1997 | Brisbane | Australia | Brisbane Entertainment Centre |
| 18 February 1997 | Newcastle | Australia | Newcastle Entertainment Centre |
| 19 February 1997 | Canberra | Australia | Royal Theatre |
| 21 February 1997 | Launceston | Australia | Silverdome |

Festivals and other miscellaneous performances
^{A} Bantry Mussel Fair
^{B} Midtfyns Festival
^{C} Fleadh Music Festival
^{D} Storsjöyran
^{E} Langelandsfestivalen
^{F} Folk Dranouter
^{G} Millstreet Music Fair
^{H} Festival Interceltique de Lorient
^{I} Rose of Tralee
