= Angel (The Corrs song) =

2004 single by the Corrs

Single by the Corrs

from the album Borrowed Heaven
- Released: 23 August 2004
- Length: 3:26
- Label: Atlantic
- Songwriter: The Corrs
- Producer: Olle Romo

The Corrs singles chronology
"Summer Sunshine" (2004)	"Angel" (2004)	"Long Night" (2004)

"Angel" is a song by Irish folk rock band the Corrs, the second single released from their fourth studio album, Borrowed Heaven (2004). The song is a tribute to the band members' mother, Jean, who died in 1999. "Angel" was first released in Australia on 23 August 2004 and was issued in the United Kingdom the following month. The song peaked at number 16 on the UK Singles Chart, number 14 in Hungary, and number 19 in Ireland.

== Music video ==
The regular video was shot in Lake Park, Roundwood, Ireland on 12 June 2004. The video features a bride and groom portrayed by Saileog Lally and Eoin Macken respectively. Lake Park is a 110-acre (0.45 km^{2}) estate near the woodlands where scenes from the film Excalibur where shot. There is a second live version which features clips of the European tour in 2004.

== Track listings ==
UK CD1

1. "Angel" (album version)
2. "Angel" (acoustic version)

UK CD2

1. "Angel" (album version)
2. "Goodbye" (acoustic)
3. "Angel" (video)
4. "Angel" (in concert video)
5. "Angel Inspiration" (two-minute interview)

European and Australian CD single

1. "Angel" (album version)
2. "Angel" (acoustic version)
3. "Goodbye" (acoustic version)

== Personnel ==
Personnel are taken from the UK CD1 liner notes.

The Corrs

- The Corrs – writing
- Andrea Corr – lead vocals, backing vocals, tin whistle
- Sharon Corr – violin, backing vocals
- Jim Corr – acoustic and electric guitars, piano, keyboards
- Caroline Corr – drums, percussion, backing vocals, bodhrán

Additional musicians

- John O'Brien – additional programming
- Tim Pierce – additional guitars

Production and recording

- Olle Romo – production, recording
- Max Surla – orchestral arrangement and performance
- Tim Martin – recording
- Steve Macmillan – recording, mixing
- Rob DeGroff – recording assistant
- Greg French – recording assistant
- Ryan Petrie – recording assistant
- Stephen Marcussen – mastering

== Charts ==
Chart (2004)	Peak position
Australia (ARIA)	65
Austria (Ö3 Austria Top 40)	75
Belgium (Ultratip Bubbling Under Flanders)	17
Belgium (Ultratip Bubbling Under Wallonia)	13
Germany (GfK)	84
Hungary (Rádiós Top 40)	14
Ireland (IRMA)	19
Netherlands (Dutch Top 40 Tipparade)	11
Netherlands (Single Top 100)	73
New Zealand (Recorded Music NZ)	36
Romania (Romanian Top 100)	70
Scotland Singles (OCC)	17
Spain (PROMUSICAE)	15
Switzerland (Schweizer Hitparade)	53
UK Singles (OCC)	16

== Release history ==
Region	Date	Format(s)	Label(s)	Ref.
Australia	23 August 2004	CD	Atlantic	
United Kingdom	13 September 2004	CD	Atlantic	
