= Forgiven, Not Forgotten =

1995 studio album by the Corrs

Studio album by the Corrs
- Released: 26 September 1995
- Recorded: May 1994 – May 1995
- Studios: Chartmaker (Malibu, California); The Record Plant (Los Angeles, California)
- Genres: Pop rock; folk rock; Celtic fusion
- Length: 48:43
- Labels: 143; Lava; Atlantic
- Producers: David Foster; Jim Corr

The Corrs chronology
Forgiven, Not Forgotten (1995)	Talk on Corners (1997)

Singles from Forgiven, Not Forgotten
- 1. "Runaway" Released: September 1995; 2. "Forgiven, Not Forgotten" Released: February 1996 (EU); 3. "The Right Time" Released: February 1996 (US); 4. "Love to Love You" Released: September 1996; 5. "Closer" Released: May 1997 (Aus)

Professional ratings
Review scores
Source	Rating
AllMusic	4/5 stars

Forgiven, Not Forgotten is the debut studio album by Irish pop rock group the Corrs. It was released by Atlantic Records on 26 September 1995 across the world. The album was primarily produced by David Foster, with additional production by Jim Corr. A special tour edition of the album was released in Australia and New Zealand featuring a bonus disc containing live and rare tracks which were recorded from their Forgiven, Not Forgotten World Tour.

The title track and the band were featured in an episode of Beverly Hills, 90210 called "Turn Back the Clock". The band performed the song at a New Year's Eve party at the Peach Pit After Dark. The album spawned five official single releases.

== Background ==
Before signing to Atlantic Records the band began recording in a makeshift-home-studio Jim rented out in their hometown of Dundalk. The band recorded on an eight-track and began making demo tapes, "I remember it being very cold... We had fruit boxes on the wall for soundproofing" Caroline remembered. After performing in Whelan's bar in Dublin, the band caught the eye of Jean Kennedy Smith who invited the band to perform at the 1994 FIFA World Cup in Boston.

Once in America they met Jason Flom, Atlantic Records's head of A&R: "When they walked into my New York office, I was immediately taken by their beauty, their obvious grace and style. They played me a cassette with "Love to Love You" and "Closer" on it, then they told me they played all the instruments themselves and wrote the songs. Man, I thought I'd died and gone to heaven." However Flom knew the band needed someone to produce their album so suggested they meet David Foster, a Canadian musician, producer, composer and arranger. While in New York, two days before the band were scheduled to head home, they crashed a recording session at The Hit Factory, a recording studio in New York City. Foster invited the band upstairs to perform around a piano, where they sang "Forgiven, Not Forgotten" live. Sharon would go on to say "I think he was taken back [sic] by how polished we sounded even then".

== Tour ==
On 26 April 1996, the Corrs embarked on their Forgiven, Not Forgotten World Tour that started in Ennis, Ireland, before then travelling to Europe, Australia, Asia, America and Canada, ultimately lasting the better part of two years.

== Track listing ==
All tracks are written by the Corrs, except where noted.

No.	Title	Writer(s)	Length
1.	"Erin Shore" (intro) (instrumental)	Traditional (arranged by the Corrs)	0:27
2.	"Forgiven, Not Forgotten"		4:15
3.	"Heaven Knows"		4:18
4.	"Along with the Girls" (instrumental)	Traditional (arranged by the Corrs)	0:49
5.	"Someday"	The Corrs; David Foster	3:51
6.	"Runaway"		4:24
7.	"The Right Time"		4:07
8.	"The Minstrel Boy" (instrumental)	Traditional (written by Thomas Moore and arranged by the Corrs)	2:12
9.	"Toss the Feathers" (instrumental)	Traditional (arranged by the Corrs)	2:50
10.	"Love to Love You"		4:08
11.	"Secret Life"		4:31
12.	"Carraroe Jig" (instrumental)	Traditional (arranged by the Corrs)	0:52
13.	"Closer"		4:05
14.	"Leave Me Alone"		3:40
15.	"Erin Shore" (instrumental)	Traditional (arranged by the Corrs and Bill Whelan)	4:14

Japanese bonus track
No.	Title	Length
16.	"Somebody Else's Boyfriend"	3:57

The Corrs – Live (Australian and New Zealand Limited Tour Edition bonus disc)
No.	Title	Length
1.	"Runaway" (live)
2.	"Secret Life" (live)
3.	"Toss the Feathers" (live) (instrumental)
4.	"Forgiven, Not Forgotten" (acoustic)
5.	"The Right Time" (acoustic)
6.	"Rainy Day" (B-side from "Love to Love You")
7.	"The Right Time" (radio edit)

== Personnel ==
=== The Band ===
- Andrea Corr – lead vocals, tin whistle
- Caroline Corr – drums, bodhrán, acoustic piano, vocals
- Jim Corr – guitar, keyboards, acoustic piano, keyboard programming, vocals
- Sharon Corr – violin, vocals

=== Featuring ===
- David Foster – additional keyboards, string arrangements
- Simon Franglen – Synclavier programming
- Michael Thompson – guitar
- Tal Herzberg – bass guitar on "Secret Life"
- Neil Stubenhaus – bass guitar on "Toss the Feathers"
- Simon Phillips – drums on "Toss the Feathers"

=== Production ===
- Producers and Arrangements – Jim Corr and David Foster
- Engineers – Andrew Boland, Felipe Elgueta and Dave Reitzas.
- Mixing – Dave Reitzas and Bob Clearmountain
- Mix Assistant – Ryan Freeland
- Mastered by Bob Ludwig at Gateway Mastering (Portland, ME).
- Assistant Mastering Engineer – Brian K. Lee
- Art Direction – Richard Bates and Sung Lee-Crawforth
- Photography – Guzman (Constance Hansen and Russell Peacock).

== Charts ==
=== Weekly charts ===
Chart (1995–99)	Peak position
Australian Albums (ARIA)	1
Austrian Albums (Ö3 Austria)	10
Belgian Albums (Ultratop Flanders)	43
Belgian Albums (Ultratop Wallonia)	37
Canadian Albums (RPM)	50
Danish Albums (Tracklisten)	5
Dutch Albums (Album Top 100)	38
French Albums (SNEP)	16
German Albums (Offizielle Top 100)	86
Irish Albums (IRMA)	2
Japanese Albums (Oricon)	72
New Zealand Albums (RMNZ)	11
Norwegian Albums (VG-lista)	12
Spanish Albums (Promusicae)	4
Swedish Albums (Sverigetopplistan)	16
Swiss Albums (Schweizer Hitparade)	37
UK Albums (Official Charts)	2
US Billboard 200	131

Chart (2023)	Peak position
Hungarian Physical Albums (MAHASZ)	24

=== Year-end charts ===
Chart (1996)	Position
Australian Albums (ARIA)	3

Chart (1997)	Position
Australian Albums (ARIA)	18
New Zealand Albums (RMNZ)	24
Spanish Albums (AFYPE)	18

Chart (1998)	Position
UK Albums (OCC)	89

Chart (1999)	Position
UK Albums (OCC)	19

== Certifications ==
Region	Certification	Certified units/sales
Australia (ARIA)	9× Platinum	680,000
Canada (Music Canada)	Platinum	100,000^{^}
Denmark (IFPI Danmark)	Platinum	50,000^{^}
France (SNEP)	2× Platinum	600,000^{*}
Ireland (IRMA)	13× Platinum	195,000^{^}
New Zealand (RMNZ)	Platinum	15,000^{^}
Norway (IFPI Norway)	Gold	25,000^{*}
Spain (Promusicae)	3× Platinum	300,000^{^}
Sweden (GLF)	Gold	50,000^{^}
United Kingdom (BPI)	3× Platinum	900,000^{^}
United States (RIAA)	Gold	500,000^{^}
Summaries
Europe (IFPI)	2× Platinum	2,000,000^{*}
^{*} Sales figures based on certification alone.^{^} Shipments figures based on certification alone.

== Release details ==
- 1995, UK, Atlantic 7567-92612-2, release date: 22 September 1995, CD
- 1995, Mexico, Atlantic 7826-94675-2, release date: 22 September 1995, CD
- 1995, UK, Atlantic 7567-92612-4, release date: 26 September 1995, Cassette
- 1995, Japan, Warner AMCY-913, release date; 21 December 1995, CD (with bonus track)
- 1996, UK (reissue), release date: 19 February 1996, CD
- 1997, Japan, Warner AMCY-2427, release date: 25 October 1997, CD (with bonus track)
- 1997, Australia, New Zealand, Atlantic 7567-92754-2, release date: January 1997, CD (limited tour edition)
- 1999, UK, Atlantic 7567926128, release date: 29 November 1999, MiniDisc
- 2001, Australia, Atlantic 7567-80963-2, release date: 2001, CD (double release with Talk on Corners special edition)
- 2001, France, Atlantic 7567-93072-2, release date: 2001, CD (as gold disc limited collector's edition)
- 2017, The Netherlands, Music On Vinyl Atlantic MOVLP1768 8719262002456, release date: 2017-05-26, 1 LP, 180-gram audiophile vinyl
