= Borrowed Heaven =

2004 studio album by the Corrs

Studio album by the Corrs
- Released: 31 May 2004
- Recorded: 2002–2004
- Studios: Westland Studios (Dublin); Tweek Studio (Los Angeles); Bill Schnee Studios (Los Angeles); Joe's Garage (Johannesburg)
- Genres: Pop rock; Celtic; baroque pop
- Length: 45:37
- Label: Atlantic
- Producer: Olle Romo

The Corrs chronology
VH1 Presents: The Corrs, Live in Dublin (2002)	Borrowed Heaven (2004)	Home (2005)

Singles from Borrowed Heaven
- 1. "Summer Sunshine" Released: 17 May 2004; 2. "Angel" Released: 23 August 2004; 3. "Long Night" Released: 6 December 2004

Borrowed Heaven is the fourth studio album by Irish rock band The Corrs, released through Atlantic Records on 31 May 2004. The album was produced by Olle Romo.

The band released three singles from this album: "Summer Sunshine", "Angel", and "Long Night". A remix version of "Goodbye" was released as a download-only single in 2006. Other notable tracks include the title track "Borrowed Heaven", which featured an appearance from Ladysmith Black Mambazo, and "Time Enough for Tears", which was penned by U2's Bono and featured in the 2002 film In America, for which it was nominated for the Golden Globe Award for Best Original Song. The acoustic performances for this album's Electronic Press Kit were recorded at the Trinity Laban Conservatoire of Music and Dance. The album would be their last album of original material until 2015's White Light.

== Critical reception ==
Professional ratings
Aggregate scores
Source	Rating
Metacritic	58/100
Review scores
Source	Rating
AllMusic	3/5 stars
MTV Asia	6/10
Yahoo! Music UK	6/10

Borrowed Heaven received mixed reviews from music critics. At Metacritic, the album has garnered a score of 58 over 100, based on 7 mainstream critics, indicating "mixed or average" reviews.

== Commercial performance ==
The album was a great success in their homeland Ireland where it peaked at number 1, with all three singles entering the Irish music charts. The album was greeted with success in western Europe, charting in nearly every country. Success in eastern Europe was varied from number 1 chart positions to not charting at all.

The Corrs set off on the Borrowed Heaven Tour in June 2004, taking the band to Europe and North America. This would be the Corrs' last tour before taking an extended hiatus in 2006 to raise families and embark on solo careers.

== Track listing ==
All tracks are written by the Corrs, except "Time Enough for Tears" by Bono, Gavin Friday, and Maurice Seezer.

No.	Title	Length
1.	"Summer Sunshine"	2:53
2.	"Angel"	3:26
3.	"Hideaway"	3:17
4.	"Long Night"	3:47
5.	"Goodbye"	4:11
6.	"Time Enough for Tears"	5:03
7.	"Humdrum"	3:43
8.	"Even If"	3:03
9.	"Borrowed Heaven"	4:21
10.	"Confidence for Quiet"	3:11
11.	"Baby Be Brave"	3:58
12.	"Silver Strand" (instrumental)	4:26
13.	"Miracle" (Japanese, French and Australian bonus track)	4:00

Digital re-release bonus tracks
No.	Title	Length
13.	"Summer Sunshine" (Fernando Garibay remix)	3:06
14.	"Summer Sunshine" (acoustic)	2:58

== Personnel ==
=== The band ===
- Andrea Corr – lead vocals, tin whistle
- Caroline Corr – drums, percussion, bodhran, vocals
- Jim Corr – acoustic and electric guitars, keyboards, piano
- Sharon Corr – violin, vocals

=== Additional musicians ===
- Tim Pierce – additional guitars on "Angel", "Even If" and "Time Enough for Tears"
- Anthony Drennan – additional guitars on "Silver Strand"
- John O'Brien – additional programming on all songs
- Pecka Erkesjo – bass on "Time Enough for Tears"
- Jon Button – upright bass on "Time Enough for Tears"
- Jim McGorman – piano on "Summer Sunshine"
- Jeff Babko – piano on "Time Enough for Tears"
- Ladysmith Black Mambazo – backing Vocals on "Borrowed Heaven"

== Charts ==
=== Weekly charts ===
Chart (2004)	Peak position
Australian Albums (ARIA)	4
Austrian Albums (Ö3 Austria)	5
Belgian Albums (Ultratop Flanders)	6
Belgian Albums (Ultratop Wallonia)	6
Danish Albums (Hitlisten)	21
Dutch Albums (Album Top 100)	4
European Albums (Billboard)	2
Finnish Albums (Suomen virallinen lista)	21
French Albums (SNEP)	5
German Albums (Offizielle Top 100)	2
Hungarian Albums (MAHASZ)	17
Irish Albums (IRMA)	1
Italian Albums (FIMI)	20
New Zealand Albums (RMNZ)	8
Norwegian Albums (VG-lista)	12
Polish Albums (ZPAV)	31
Portuguese Albums (AFP)	13
Scottish Albums (Official Charts)	2
Singaporean Albums (RIAS)	2
Spanish Albums (PROMUSICAE)	2
Swedish Albums (Sverigetopplistan)	12
Swiss Albums (Schweizer Hitparade)	3
UK Albums (Official Charts)	2
US Billboard 200	51

=== Year-end charts ===
Chart (2004)	Peak position
Australian Albums (ARIA)	71
Belgian Albums (Ultratop Flanders)	80
Belgian Albums (Ultratop Wallonia)	70
Dutch Albums (MegaCharts)	61
French Albums (SNEP)	107
German Albums (GfK)	56
Swiss Albums (Hitparade)	37
UK Albums (OCC)	89

== Certifications ==
Region	Certification	Certified units/sales
Australia (ARIA)	Platinum	70,000^{^}
France (SNEP)	Gold	100,000^{*}
Germany (BVMI)	Gold	100,000^{^}
New Zealand (RMNZ)	Gold	7,500^{^}
Spain (Promusicae)	Gold	50,000^{^}
Switzerland (IFPI Switzerland)	Gold	20,000^{^}
United Kingdom (BPI)	Gold	100,000^{^}
^{*} Sales figures based on certification alone.^{^} Shipments figures based on certification alone.

== Release history ==
Region	Date	Format	Label
Australia	28 May 2004	CD	Warner Music
Ireland	28 May 2004	CD	Warner Music
Japan	28 May 2004	CD	Warner Music
United Kingdom	31 May 2004	CD	Warner Music
Taiwan	1 June 2004	CD	Atlantic
United States	8 June 2004	CD	Atlantic
