= Summer Sunshine =

2004 single by the Corrs

Single by the Corrs

from the album Borrowed Heaven
- Released: 17 May 2004
- Length: 2:55
- Label: Atlantic
- Songwriter: The Corrs
- Producer: Olle Romo

The Corrs singles chronology
"When the Stars Go Blue" (2002)	"Summer Sunshine" (2004)	"Angel" (2004)

Music video
- "Summer Sunshine" on YouTube

"Summer Sunshine" is a song by Irish band the Corrs, the opening track from their fourth studio album, Borrowed Heaven (2004). The song was released as the album's first single on 17 May 2004, reaching number 12 in the band's native Ireland and number six on the UK Singles Chart. In Hungary, "Summer Sunshine" peaked at number one for two weeks. Elsewhere, the song reached number two in Spain and peaked within the top 20 in Australia, Italy, and the Netherlands. The music video was directed by Kevin Godley.

== Composition ==
According to lead vocalist Andrea Corr, "Summer Sunshine" is a joyful-sounding song with melancholy lyrics. She explained that the song is about a "secret love that you can never quite get over, a forbidden love that lives in your head". Set in common time, "Summer Sunshine" is composed in the key of F major with a tempo of 124 beats per minute.

== Music video ==
Shot in London on 15 and 16 March 2004, the video portrays a couple inside a dark house, which the Corrs are tearing down. The house is eventually reduced to ruins but the couple emerge from it, safe and in the sunshine.

== Track listings ==
UK CD1

1. "Summer Sunshine" – 2:53
2. "Summer Sunshine" (Fernando Garibay Remix) – 3:06

UK CD2

1. "Summer Sunshine" (single version)
2. "Summer Sunshine" (acoustic)
3. "Summer Sunshine" (Ford Remix edit)
4. "Summer Sunshine" (video)
5. "Silver Strand" (live acoustic)
6. Behind the scenes at the video

European CD single

1. "Summer Sunshine"
2. "Summer Sunshine" (acoustic version)

Australian CD single

1. "Summer Sunshine"
2. "Summer Sunshine" (acoustic version)
3. "Summer Sunshine" (Fernando Garibay Remix)

== Credits and personnel ==
Credits are lifted from the European CD single liner notes.

Studios

- Mixed at MacMan Digital (Los Angeles, California, US)
- Mastered at Marcussen Mastering (Los Angeles, California, US)
- Acoustic version recorded and mixed at Sanctuary Westside Studios (London, UK)

The Corrs

- The Corrs – writing
  - Andrea Corr – lead vocals, backing vocals, tin whistle
  - Sharon Corr – violin, backing vocals
  - Jim Corr – acoustic and electric guitars, piano, keyboards
  - Caroline Corr – drums, percussion, backing vocals, bodhrán

Additional musicians

- Jim McGorman – piano
- Max Surla – orchestral arrangement and performance

Others

- Olle Romo – production, programming, mixing
- Tim Martin – recording
- Steve MacMillan – recording, mixing
- Stephen Marcussen – mastering
- Stylorouge – artwork design and direction
- Kevin Westenberg – photography

== Charts ==
=== Weekly charts ===
Chart (2004)	Peak position
Australia (ARIA)	13
Austria (Ö3 Austria Top 40)	42
Belgium (Ultratop 50 Flanders)	46
Belgium (Ultratip Bubbling Under Wallonia)	5
Canada AC Top 30 (Radio & Records)	10
Canada Hot AC Top 30 (Radio & Records)	13
CIS Airplay (TopHit)	26
Europe (Eurochart Hot 100)	14
Germany (GfK)	49
Greece (IFPI)	50
Hungary (Rádiós Top 40)	1
Ireland (IRMA)	12
Italy (FIMI)	17
Netherlands (Dutch Top 40)	29
Netherlands (Single Top 100)	20
New Zealand (Recorded Music NZ)	30
Romania (Romanian Top 100)	37
Scotland Singles (OCC)	5
Spain (PROMUSICAE)	2
Switzerland (Schweizer Hitparade)	32
UK Singles (OCC)	6
US Adult Contemporary (Billboard)	29
US Adult Pop Airplay (Billboard)	32

=== Year-end charts ===
Chart (2004)	Position
UK Singles (OCC)	135

== Release history ==
Region	Date	Format(s)	Label(s)	Ref.
United States	26 April 2004	Adult contemporary; hot adult contemporary radio	Atlantic	
Australia	17 May 2004	CD	Atlantic	
United Kingdom	17 May 2004	CD	Atlantic	
