= Lifelines (Andrea Corr album) =

Studio album by Andrea Corr
- Released: 29 May 2011
- Recorded: 2010
- Genres: Pop; soul; folk; rock
- Label: AC Records
- Producers: John Reynolds, Brian Eno

Andrea Corr chronology
| Ten Feet High (2007) | Lifelines (2011) |

Singles from Lifelines
- 1. "Tinseltown in the Rain" Released: 17 April 2011; 2. "Pale Blue Eyes"/"Blue Bayou" Released: 2011

Professional ratings
Review scores
| Source | Rating |
|---|---|
| Allmusic | 3.5/5 stars |

Lifelines is the second studio album by Andrea Corr. It was released on 29 May 2011 as a digital download and 30 May 2011 on CD. The album consists of covers of songs by The Velvet Underground, Kirsty MacColl, Harry Nilsson, Ron Sexsmith, Nick Drake, The Blue Nile and others. The lead single, "Tinseltown in the Rain", was released to the iTunes Store on 17 April 2011. As well as standard CD and digital download releases, the album was released as a special limited edition with a bonus DVD containing exclusive performances and interviews. To promote the album, Corr has performed songs from it at shows in London, Birmingham, Glasgow, Salford and at the Isle of Wight Festival 2011. She has also promoted it in media interviews and in performances around Europe.

== Track listing ==
| No. | Title | Writer(s) | Length |
|---|---|---|---|
| 1. | "I'll Be Seeing You" | Irving Kahal, Sammy Fain | 2:31 |
| 2. | "Pale Blue Eyes" | Lou Reed | 6:08 |
| 3. | "Blue Bayou" | Roy Orbison; Joe Melson | 2:40 |
| 4. | "From the Morning" | Nick Drake | 3:19 |
| 5. | "State of Independence" | Vangelis; Jon Anderson | 5:37 |
| 6. | "No 9 Dream" | John Lennon | 4:12 |
| 7. | "Tinseltown in the Rain" | Robert Bell; Paul Buchanan | 4:42 |
| 8. | "They Don't Know" | Kirsty MacColl | 3:09 |
| 9. | "Lifeline" | Harry Nilsson | 3:26 |
| 10. | "Tomorrow in Her Eyes" | Ron Sexsmith | 2:36 |
| 11. | "Some Things Last a Long Time" | Jad Fair; Daniel Johnston | 3:33 |

iTunes bonus track
| No. | Title | Writer(s) | Length |
|---|---|---|---|
| 12. | "The Crystal Ship" | Jim Morrison; Ray Manzarek; John Densmore; Robby Krieger | 3:40 |

Deluxe edition bonus track†
| No. | Title | Writer(s) | Length |
|---|---|---|---|
| 12. | "You've Got a Friend" | Carole King | 4:20 |

† Available as a download using a code included in deluxe edition packages.

== Personnel ==
- Andrea Corr - vocals
- Kevin Armstrong - guitars
- Justin Adams - guitars
- Damien Dempsey - acoustic guitar
- Clare Kenny - bass
- John Reynolds - drums, percussion
- Brian Eno - keyboards, sounds, backing vocals (tracks 2–5)
- Julian Wilson - keyboards, Hammond organ
- Caroline Dale - cello
- Screaming Orphans - backing vocals
- James O'Grady - Uilleann pipes

=== Additional personnel ===
- Sinéad O'Connor - backing vocals (track 7)
- Lumiere - backing vocals (track 11)

=== Technical personnel ===
- Production - John Reynolds
- Co-production - Brian Eno (tracks 2–5)
- Additional engineers - Adrian Hall, Alan Branch
- Mixing - John Reynolds, Tim Oliver
- Mastering - Kevin Metcalf
- Design - Peacock
- Photography - Jessie Craig
- Music Video Editor - Zoe Davis BFE

== Charts ==
| Chart (2011) | Peak position |
|---|---|
| Irish Albums Chart | 40 |
| Irish Indie Albums Chart | 9 |
| UK Albums Chart | 48 |

== Release history ==
| Region | Date | Label | Format | Catalogue |
|---|---|---|---|---|
| Ireland | 29 May 2011 | AC Records | Digital download, CD, CD+DVD | - |
| United Kingdom | 29 May 2011 | AC Records | Digital download, CD, CD+DVD | - |
| United States | 29 May 2011 | AC Records | Digital download, CD, CD+DVD | - |
| Japan | 30 May 2011 | AC Records (locally distributed by Pony Canyon and Eq Music) | CD | - |
| United Kingdom | 30 May 2011 | AC Records | Digital download, CD, CD+DVD | - |
| Spain | 26 June 2011 | AC Records (locally distributed by Pias Recordings Spain) | CD+DVD | |
| Philippines | 7 September 2011 | AC Records (locally distributed by Universal Records (Philippines) | CD+DVD | - |
| Korea | 15 September 2011 | AC Records | CD | - |
| France | 6 June 2011 | XIII Bis Records | CD | - |
