= In Blue Tour =

2000–01 concert tour by the Corrs

- Tour by The Corrs
- Promotional poster for the tour
- Location: Asia; Europe; North America; Oceania
- Associated album: In Blue
- Start date: 31 October 2000
- End date: 25 October 2001
- Legs: 6
- No. of shows: 62

The Corrs concert chronology
- Talk on Corners Tour (1997–99); In Blue Tour (2000–01); Borrowed Heaven Tour (2004)

The In Blue Tour is the third concert tour by Irish band the Corrs. Promoting their third studio album, In Blue, the tour performed in Europe, North America, Australasia and Asia. The band performed over shows beginning October 2000 until October 2001.

== Opening acts ==
- Picturehouse (31 October – 18 November 2000)
- Brian Kennedy (20–22 December 2000, 8–19 January 2001, 14–16 March 2001, 1–11 April 2001)
- BBMak (6 April 2001)
- David Gray (11–17 October 2001)
- Nigel Kennedy (25 October 2001)

== Tour dates ==
List of 2000 concerts
Date	City	Country	Venue
31 October 2000	Hamburg	Germany	Alsterdorfer Sporthalle
1 November 2000	Hanover	Germany	Stadionsporthalle
3 November 2000	Rotterdam	Netherlands	Rotterdam Ahoy
4 November 2000	Paris	France	Zénith de Paris
6 November 2000	Zürich	Switzerland	Hallenstadion
7 November 2000	Milan	Italy	PalaVobis
9 November 2000	Düsseldorf	Germany	Philipshalle
10 November 2000	Brussels	Belgium	Forest National
12 November 2000	Frankfurt	Germany	Festhalle Frankfurt
13 November 2000	Berlin	Germany	ICC Berlin Hall 1
14 November 2000	Vienna	Austria	Wiener Stadthalle
16 November 2000	Munich	Germany	Olympiahalle
18 November 2000	Stockholm	Sweden	Stockholm Globe Arena
21 November 2000^{[A]}	New York City	United States	Beacon Theatre
30 November 2000^{[B]}	Los Angeles	United States	Shrine Auditorium
6 December 2000^{[C]}	Miami	United States	Level Nightclub
10 December 2000^{[D]}	Washington, D.C.	United States	National Building Museum
11 December 2000^{[E]}	Providence	United States	Providence Civic Center
12 December 2000^{[F]}	Portland	United States	Cumberland County Civic Center
14 December 2000	Raleigh	United States	Raleigh Memorial Auditorium
15 December 2000	St. Petersburg	United States	Mahaffey Theater
20 December 2000	London	England	Wembley Arena
21 December 2000	London	England	Wembley Arena
22 December 2000	London	England	Wembley Arena

List of 2001 concerts
Date	City	Country	Venue
8 January 2001^{[G]}	Newcastle	England	Telewest Arena
9 January 2001	Birmingham	England	NEC Arena
10 January 2001	Birmingham	England	NEC Arena
12 January 2001	Birmingham	England	NEC Arena
13 January 2001	Birmingham	England	NEC Arena
15 January 2001	Clyst St Mary	England	Westpoint Arena
16 January 2001	Clyst St Mary	England	Westpoint Arena
18 January 2001	Glasgow	Scotland	Scottish Exhibition and Conference Centre
19 January 2001	Glasgow	Scotland	Scottish Exhibition and Conference Centre
14 March 2001	Chicago	United States	Vic Theatre
16 March 2001	New York City	United States	Radio City Music Hall
1 April 2001	Sheffield	England	Sheffield Arena
2 April 2001	Sheffield	England	Sheffield Arena
4 April 2001	Manchester	England	Manchester Evening News Arena
5 April 2001	Manchester	England	Manchester Evening News Arena
6 April 2001	Aberdeen	Scotland	AECC Arena
8 April 2001	Birmingham	England	NEC Arena
9 April 2001	Nottingham	England	Nottingham Arena
11 April 2001	Newcastle	England	Telewest Arena
1 June 2001^{[H]}	Uniondale	United States	Nassau Veterans Memorial Coliseum
2 June 2001^{[I]}	Mansfield	United States	Tweeter Center for the Performing Arts
28 August 2001^{[J]}	Brisbane	Australia	Brisbane Entertainment Centre
30 August 2001	Newcastle	Australia	Newcastle Entertainment Centre
1 September 2001	Sydney	Australia	Sydney Entertainment Centre
20 September 2001	Osaka	Japan	Koseinenkin Kaikan Dai-Hall
22 September 2001	Tokyo	Japan	Tokyo International Forum
23 September 2001	Tokyo	Japan	Tokyo International Forum
27 September 2001	Hong Kong		Hong Kong Convention and Exhibition Centre
29 September 2001	Quezon City	Philippines	Araneta Coliseum
30 September 2001	Quezon City	Philippines	Araneta Coliseum
3 October 2001	Jakarta	Indonesia	Plenary Hall
6 October 2001	Singapore		Singapore Indoor Stadium
7 October 2001	Kuala Lumpur	Malaysia	Putra Indoor Stadium
11 October 2001	Sydney	Australia	Sydney Entertainment Centre
12 October 2001	Sydney	Australia	Sydney Entertainment Centre
14 October 2001	Auckland	New Zealand	North Harbour Stadium
16 October 2001	Melbourne	Australia	Rod Laver Arena
17 October 2001	Melbourne	Australia	Rod Laver Arena
25 October 2001	London	England	Royal Albert Hall

Festivals and other miscellaneous performances
^{A} World Aids Day benefit concert
^{B} VH1 Music Awards
^{C} Vogue Takes over Miami
^{D} Christmas in Washington
^{E} 92 PRO-FM Jingle Mingle
^{F} QBash
^{G} Charity concert benefiting the Freeman Hospital
^{H} Zootopia
^{I} Kiss Concert 2001
^{J} Goodwill Games Opening Ceremony

Cancellations and rescheduled shows

21 January 2001	Aberdeen, Scotland	AECC Arena	Rescheduled to 6 April 2001
22 January 2001	Newcastle, England	Telewest Arena	Rescheduled to 11 April 2001
24 January 2001	Sheffield, England	Sheffield Arena	Rescheduled to 1 April 2001
25 January 2001	Nottingham, England	Nottingham Arena	Rescheduled to 9 April 2001
27 January 2001	Manchester, England	Manchester Evening News Arena	Rescheduled to 4 April 2001
28 January 2001	Manchester, England	Manchester Evening News Arena	Rescheduled to 5 April 2001
29 January 2001	London, England	Royal Albert Hall	Cancelled. This concert was a part of The Prince's Trust.
9 February 2001	Osaka, Japan	Koseinenkin Kaikan Dai-Hall	Rescheduled to 20 September 2001
11 February 2001	Tokyo, Japan	Tokyo International Forum	Rescheduled to 22 September 2001
12 February 2001	Tokyo, Japan	Tokyo International Forum	Rescheduled to 23 September 2001
14 February 2001	Singapore	Suntec Singapore International Convention and Exhibition Centre	Rescheduled to 6 October 2001 and moved to the Singapore Indoor Stadium
16 February 2001	Quezon City, Philippines	Araneta Coliseum	Rescheduled to 29 September 2001
19 February 2001	Melbourne, Australia	Rod Laver Arena	Rescheduled to 16 October 2001
20 February 2001	Melbourne, Australia	Rod Laver Arena	Rescheduled to 17 October 2001
22 February 2001	Sydney, Australia	Sydney Entertainment Centre	Rescheduled to 11 October 2001
23 February 2001	Sydney, Australia	Sydney Entertainment Centre	Rescheduled to 12 October 2001
25 February 2001	Auckland, New Zealand	North Harbour Stadium	Rescheduled to 14 October 2001
27 February 2001	Jakarta, Indonesia	Plenary Hall	Rescheduled to 3 October 2001
1 March 2001	Kuala Lumpur, Malayasia	Putra Indoor Stadium	Rescheduled to 7 October 2001

== Personnel ==
Band

- Andrea Corr (lead vocals, tin whistle)
- Sharon Corr (violin, vocals)
- Caroline Corr (drums, bodhran, piano, vocals)
- Jim Corr (guitars, keyboards, vocals)
- Keith Duffy (bass)
- Anthony Drennan (lead guitar)

Management & Agents

- John Hughes (manager)
- Emma Hill (management assistant)
- John Giddings at Solo ITG (international agent)
- Barry Gaster (Irish agent)

The Crew

- Henry McGroggan (tour manager)
- Aiden Lee (production manager)
- Liam McCarthy (lighting designer)
- Max Bisgrove (sound engineer)
- Paul 'Mini' Moore (monitor engineer)
- Declan Hogan (drum technician)
- John Parsons (guitar technician)
- Oisin Murray (midi technician)
- Jay Mascrey (makeup)

== Broadcasts and recordings ==
- On 21 December 2000 The Corrs performed a Christmas show at Wembley Arena which was broadcast live on Sky One. The recording was later edited and released as a live DVD named "The Corrs: Live in London".
- An Access All Arenas Documentary which was recorded in Sweden, Stockholm at Stockholm Globe Arena.
- After Christmas The Corrs did a charity concert in Newcastle upon Tyne at the Telewest Arena on lung Cancer
- In 2001 on Band's Australia Tour Arena TV recorded A Day in the Life seeing a promo day for the band and the in and out of being a superstar. (Also included live footage from 1 September in Sydney)
