= Ten Feet High =

Studio album by Andrea Corr
- Released: 21 June 2007
- Recorded: 2006
- Genre: Pop; electropop
- Length: 38:41
- Label: Atlantic
- Producer: Nellee Hooper

Andrea Corr chronology
Ten Feet High (2007)	Lifelines (2011)

Singles from Ten Feet High
- 1. "Shame on You (to Keep My Love from Me)" Released: 11 June 2007; 2. "Champagne from a Straw" Released: 27 August 2007

Professional ratings
Review scores
Source	Rating
AllMusic	3.5/5 stars
IndieLondon.co.uk	4/5 stars
Starpulse.com	4/5 stars
The Times	2/5 stars

Ten Feet High is the debut solo album by Andrea Corr, released on 25 June 2007 . Previously titled Present, the album was produced by Nellee Hooper whose credits include U2, Gwen Stefani, Madonna, and Björk and was executively produced by U2's Bono. String arrangements were by Anne Dudley and Michael Jennings. The album's lead single, "Shame on You (to Keep My Love from Me)", was released on 18 June 2007.

All the songs on the album were composed by Andrea herself save for a cover of the first Squeeze hit "Take Me I'm Yours".

Sales were generally very poor despite the high promotion for the album and generally favourable reviews. The album failed to make an impact in most of Europe and Australia, where it peaked at number 98 on the Australian ARIA Albums Chart. The album peaked at number 38 in the UK but soon dropped down the chart. The album achieved quite good sales in Spain, peaking inside the top 10 within the first week of its release.

== Track listing ==
All tracks are written by Andrea Corr, except "Take Me I'm Yours" by Chris Difford and Glenn Tilbrook.

No.	Title	Length
1.	"Hello Boys"	2:51
2.	"Anybody There"	3:19
3.	"Shame on You (to Keep My Love from Me)"	3:59
4.	"I Do"	2:06
5.	"Ten Feet High"	3:23
6.	"Champagne from a Straw"	3:35
7.	"24 Hours"	3:00
8.	"This Is What It's All About"	3:38
9.	"Take Me I'm Yours"	3:08
10.	"Stupidest Girl in the World"	3:42
11.	"Ideal World"	2:22
12.	"Shame on You (to Keep My Love from Me)" (radio edit)	3:36

Japanese bonus track
No.	Title	Length
13.	"Amazing"	2:26

Digital download bonus tracks
No.	Title	Length
13.	"Shame on You (to Keep My Love from Me)" (acoustic version)	3:01
14.	"Shame on You (to Keep My Love from Me)" (acoustic sessions video)	3:10

== Release history ==
- Japan: 21 June 2007
- Ireland: 22 June 2007
- UK/Europe: 25 June 2007
- Canada: 26 June 2007
- Finland: 27 June 2007
- Germany: 29 June 2007
- Australia 23 July 2007
- New Zealand 7 August 2007
- Spain: 21 August 2007
- Portugal: 27 August 2007

== Charts ==
Weekly chart performance for Ten Feet High
Chart (2007)	Peak position
Australian Albums (ARIA)	98
Dutch Albums (Album Top 100)	84
French Albums (SNEP)	128
German Albums (Offizielle Top 100)	86
Irish Albums (IRMA)	24
Scottish Albums (OCC)	43
Spanish Albums (Promusicae)	9
Swiss Albums (Schweizer Hitparade)	42
UK Albums (OCC)	38
