= Shame on You (to Keep My Love from Me) =

Single by Andrea Corr

from the album Ten Feet High
- Released: 11 June 2007
- Genre: Dance-pop
- Length: 3:59
- Label: Atlantic
- Songwriter: Andrea Corr
- Producer: Nellee Hooper

Andrea Corr singles chronology
"Shame on You (to Keep My Love from Me)" (2007)	"Champagne from a Straw" (2007)

"Shame on You (to Keep My Love from Me)" is the debut solo single written and performed by Andrea Corr for her debut solo album Ten Feet High (2007). It is an anti-war protest song written from the viewpoint of a female whose partner has gone off to war. The song was released as the album's first single in June 2007 to positive reviews from music critics.

== Background and writing ==
Andrea Corr never intended to compose a song about conscription and war. "Shame on You (to Keep My Love from Me)" began as a love song, but later progressed into an anti-war song after Corr had read the novel Birdsong by Sebastian Faulks, which describes a man's life during World War I. The novel influenced her to evaluate how the wars in Afghanistan and Iraq have impacted society. Corr has called these wars an "immense waste" because they destroy the "beautiful things in life". Corr was also deeply moved by photographs of young soldiers that had been killed. She has said that these photographs made her think of the "children [the deceased] won't have and the husband or wife they've left behind or won't marry."

"Shame on You (to Keep My Love from Me)" is an up-tempo pop song about how men and women go off to war leaving behind partners that they will never see again. The song was composed by Corr and produced by Nellee Hooper, who had produced hits for artists such as Gwen Stefani and Madonna. The song is written in the common verse-chorus form and features instrumentation from keyboards and guitars.

== Critical reception ==
"Shame on You (to Keep My Love from Me)" received positive reviews from music critics. IndieLondon described the song as a "slick package" that was "polished, well produced and with a message that's difficult to ignore". Losing Today's David Adair gave the song a strong review, writing that Corr's vocals were "crisp and uplifting". Liverpool's Daily Post gave the song a three star rating, commenting that it was "deceptively upbeat" which masked its "heavier message about conscription and war".

== Music video ==
The video was directed by Dani Jacobs who worked with Andrea on four of the previous Corrs videos. The ideas in the lyrics about war were expanded for the video. The additional imagery features real documentary pictures of children who have been conscripted as child soldiers in various recent conflicts.

== Charts ==
Chart	Position
Spain Los 40 Principales	20
Irish Singles Chart	43
UK Singles (OCC)	108

== Track listing ==
CD single (released June 18, 2007)

1. "Shame on You (to Keep My Love from Me)" (radio edit)
2. "Shame on You (to Keep My Love from Me)" (album version)
