= When the Stars Go Blue =

2001 song by Ryan Adams

Song by Ryan Adams

from the album Gold
- Released: September 25, 2001
- Studio: The Sound Factory (Hollywood, California)
- Genre: Alternative country; rock
- Length: 3:31
- Label: Lost Highway
- Songwriter: Ryan Adams
- Producer: Ethan Johns

"When the Stars Go Blue" is a popular alternative country song composed and originally recorded by solo artist and former Whiskeytown band member Ryan Adams. It was first released on his album Gold on September 25, 2001, and has been described as the "most gorgeous ballad" on that album. "When the Stars Go Blue" has been covered by many artists, including Irish band the Corrs (featuring Bono of U2), fellow country music singer Tim McGraw, and Norwegian artists Venke Knutson and Kurt Nilsen as a duo.

== Personnel ==
- Ryan Adams - vocals, acoustic guitar
- Richard Causon - piano
- Ethan Johns - 12 string guitar, harmonium, electric piano, mandocello, Chamberlain strings, drums
- Julianna Raye - background vocals

== The Corrs version ==
"When the Stars Go Blue"

Single by the Corrs featuring Bono

from the album VH1 Presents: The Corrs, Live in Dublin
- Released: April 15, 2002
- Recorded: January 25, 2002
- Length: 4:19
- Label: 143; Atlantic; Lava
- Songwriter: Ryan Adams
- Producer: Mitchell Froom

The Corrs singles chronology
"Would You Be Happier (Live)" (2002)	"When the Stars Go Blue" (2002)	"Summer Sunshine" (2004)

Irish band the Corrs recorded the song on their album VH1 Presents: The Corrs, Live in Dublin, featuring U2's Bono. The cover was released on April 15, 2002, in the United States, reaching number 11 on the Billboard Adult Alternative Airplay chart and number 18 on the Adult Top 40. The song was remixed for their album Dreams: The Ultimate Corrs Collection in 2006.

=== Charts ===
==== Weekly charts ====
Chart (2002)	Peak position
Spain Airplay (AFYVE)	1
US Adult Alternative Airplay (Billboard)	11
US Adult Pop Airplay (Billboard)	18

==== Year-end charts ====
Chart (2002)	Position
US Adult Top 40 (Billboard)	46
US Triple-A (Billboard)	30

=== Release history ===
Region	Date	Format(s)	Label(s)	Ref.
United States	April 15, 2002	Triple A radio	143; Atlantic; Lava	
United States	July 29, 2002	Contemporary hit radio	143; Atlantic; Lava	

== Venke Knutson and Kurt Nilsen version ==
"When the Stars Go Blue"

Single by Venke Knutson and Kurt Nilsen

from the album Places I Have Been
- Released: February 2006
- Recorded: 2005
- Genre: Pop
- Label: Universal
- Songwriter: Ryan Adams

Venke Knutson singles chronology
"Just a Minute" (2006)	"When the Stars Go Blue" (2006)	"Holiday" (2006)

Kurt Nilsen singles chronology
"Never Easy" (2005)	"When the Stars Go Blue" (2006)	"Push Push" (2006)

Music video
- "When the Stars Go Blue" on YouTube

Norwegian singers Venke Knutson and World Idol Kurt Nilsen recorded a duet that appears in Knutson's album 2005 Places I Have Been. The song was released as a single in Norway in February 2006, reaching number 14 on the Norwegian Singles Chart.

Chart (2006)	Peak position
Norway (VG-lista)	14

== Tim McGraw version ==
"When the Stars Go Blue"

Single by Tim McGraw

from the album Reflected: Greatest Hits Vol. 2
- Released: March 6, 2006
- Genre: Country; country rock
- Length: 3:55; 3:28 (single version)
- Label: Curb
- Songwriter: Ryan Adams
- Producers: Byron Gallimore; Tim McGraw; Darran Smith

Tim McGraw singles chronology
"My Old Friend" (2005)	"When the Stars Go Blue" (2006)	"My Little Girl" (2006)

Music video
- "When the Stars Go Blue" on YouTube

In 2006, the song was released by Tim McGraw as the first single from his compilation album Tim McGraw Reflected: Greatest Hits Vol. 2. Heribert Severing, creator and writer of severing.nu, included McGraw's version of "When the Stars Go Blue" on his list of the top Country singles of 2006.

=== Chart performance ===
"When the Stars Go Blue" debuted at number 35 on the U.S. Billboard Hot Country Songs for the week of March 18, 2006.

Chart (2006)	Peak position
Canada Country (Radio & Records)	1
US Hot Country Songs (Billboard)	4
US Billboard Hot 100	37
US Billboard Pop 100	50
US Adult Contemporary (Billboard)	12
US Adult Pop Airplay (Billboard)	35

Year-end chart (2006)	Position
US Country Songs (Billboard)	20
US Adult Contemporary (Billboard)	20

=== Certifications ===
Certifications for When the Stars Go Blue
Region	Certification	Certified units/sales
United States (RIAA)	Platinum	1,000,000^{‡}
^{‡} Sales+streaming figures based on certification alone.

== Other versions ==
Irish/British girl group Wonderland performed the track for their debut performance on television in Ireland. The recorded studio version was included the band's lone album Wonderland.

It was also featured in One Tree Hill as a hit song by fictional characters Haley James Scott and Chris Keller (real life singers Bethany Joy Lenz and Tyler Hilton) and features on the One Tree Hill Soundtrack.

Irish band The Corrs performed the song during their Live in Dublin VH1 Special with Bono of U2. The song later appeared in a studio version on their Dreams: The Ultimate Corrs Collection. The song was also performed on select dates throughout their Borrowed Heaven tour.

The song was performed by Blake Lewis on American Idol Season 6, originally airing on April 17, 2007. His cover of the song made it to #92 of the pop charts in 2007.

On July 16, 2006, Phil Lesh covered the song in the first set of a show at Charter One Pavilion in Chicago, Illinois. The show was made available for purchase via compact disc by Phil Lesh and Friends. On April 5, 2014, Lesh covered the song in the first set of a show at the Capitol Theatre in Port Chester, New York.

== In popular culture ==
The song inspired a novel of the same name.

The song was also covered by actress Bethany Joy Lenz and Tyler Hilton in the second season of The CW's One Tree Hill.
