= Long Night (The Corrs song) =

2004 single by the Corrs

Single by the Corrs

from the album Borrowed Heaven
- B-side: "Hideaway" (acoustic)
- Released: 6 December 2004
- Length: 3:47
- Label: Atlantic
- Songwriter: The Corrs
- Producer: Olle Romo

The Corrs singles chronology
"Angel" (2004)	"Long Night" (2004)	"Heart Like a Wheel/Old Town" (2005)

"Long Night" is a single by Irish family band the Corrs, taken as the third single from their fourth studio album, Borrowed Heaven (2004). The song was written by Sharon Corr and released on 6 December 2004 in the United Kingdom. Even though it was not a hit around Europe or Australia, it became popular in Brazil after its use on a famous prime time national soap opera Senhora do Destino.

== Music video ==
The video for "Long Night" only features Andrea and, very briefly, Sharon during her violin solo. Apart from that, we see different versions of Andrea moving backwards through a love affair with a young man. It was shot on 29 October 2004.

The location for the video shooting was Chicheley Hall in Buckinghamshire, which was built in the 18th century and is still open for public today. You can spot a picture of the entrance hall here.

== Track listings ==
UK CD1 and European CD single

1. "Long Night" (radio edit)
2. "Long Night" (acoustic)

UK CD2

1. "Long Night" (album version)
2. "Hideaway" (acoustic)
3. "Long Night" (video)
4. "Long Night" (On the Road video)
5. Making of the video

Australian CD single

1. "Long Night" (album version)
2. "Long Night" (acoustic)
3. "Hideaway" (acoustic)

== Charts ==
Chart (2004–2005)	Peak position
Australia (ARIA)	86
Austria (Ö3 Austria Top 40)	48
Germany (GfK)	40
Ireland (IRMA)	31
New Zealand (Recorded Music NZ)	36
Scotland Singles (OCC)	29
Swiss Airplay (Swiss Hitparade)	26
UK Singles (OCC)	31

== Release history ==
Region	Date	Format	Label	Ref.
United Kingdom	6 December 2004	CD	Atlantic	
