= Langelandsfestivalen =

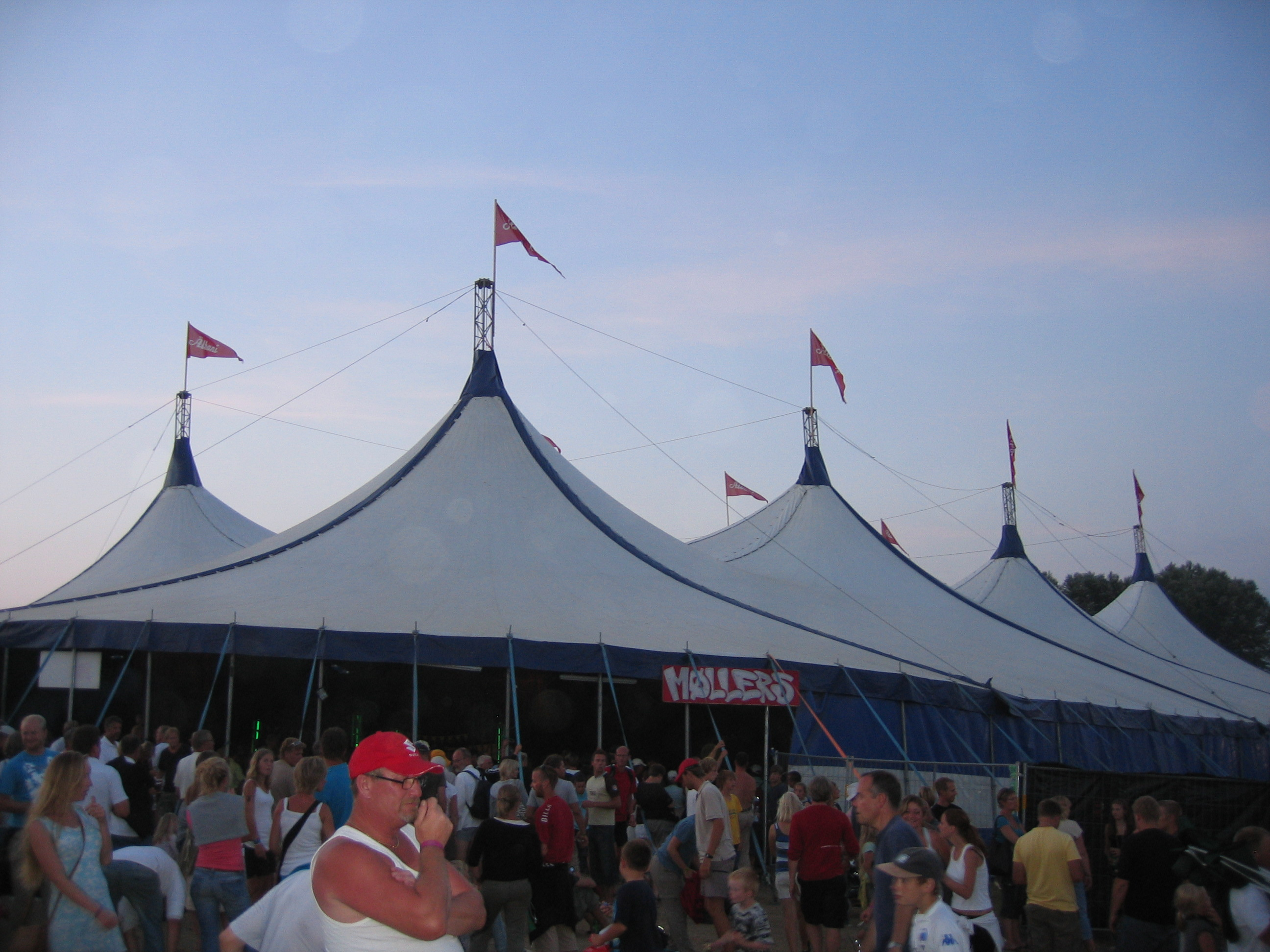
"Møllers" tent at Langelandsfestivalen 2006

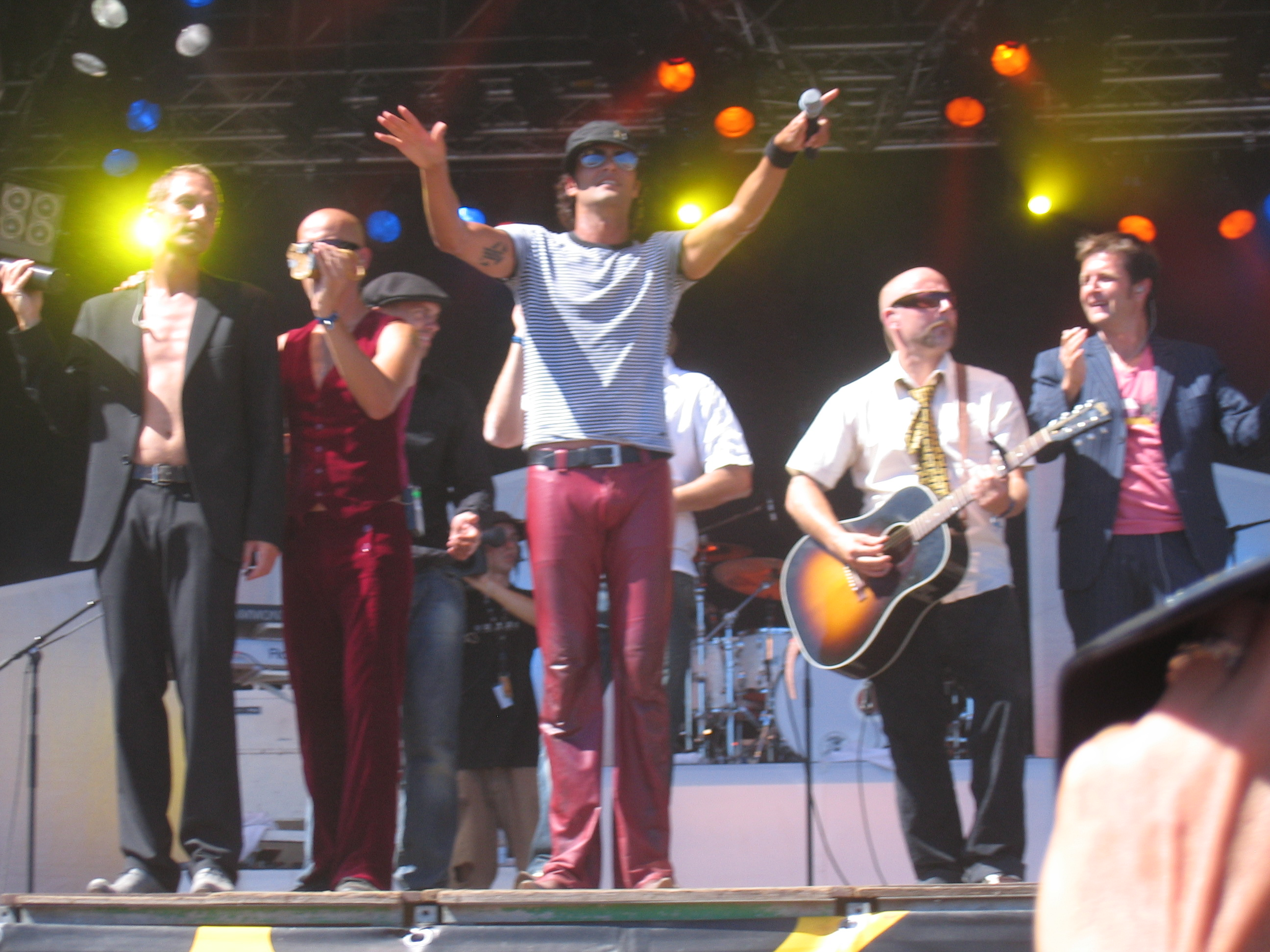
Danish band Zididada in 2006

Langelandsfestivalen, also known as Denmark's largest garden party, is a Danish family festival.

The festival began in 1991 and over time has grown into one of Denmark's biggest festivals with 30,000 to 35,000 visitors in 2008. It is usually held in the last week of July and typically lasts for four days, although in 2010 it will be held for a full week, from July 24 to July 31.

It is held in scenic surroundings on the Rue Mark outskirts of Rudkøbing on Langeland with the beach.

Langelandsfestivalen is part of the AKP Group, and tickets to the festival in 2008 cost about 1700 kr, while children under 6 years have free admission by an adult.
