= Andrea Corr =

Irish musician (born 1974)

Andrea Corr MBE
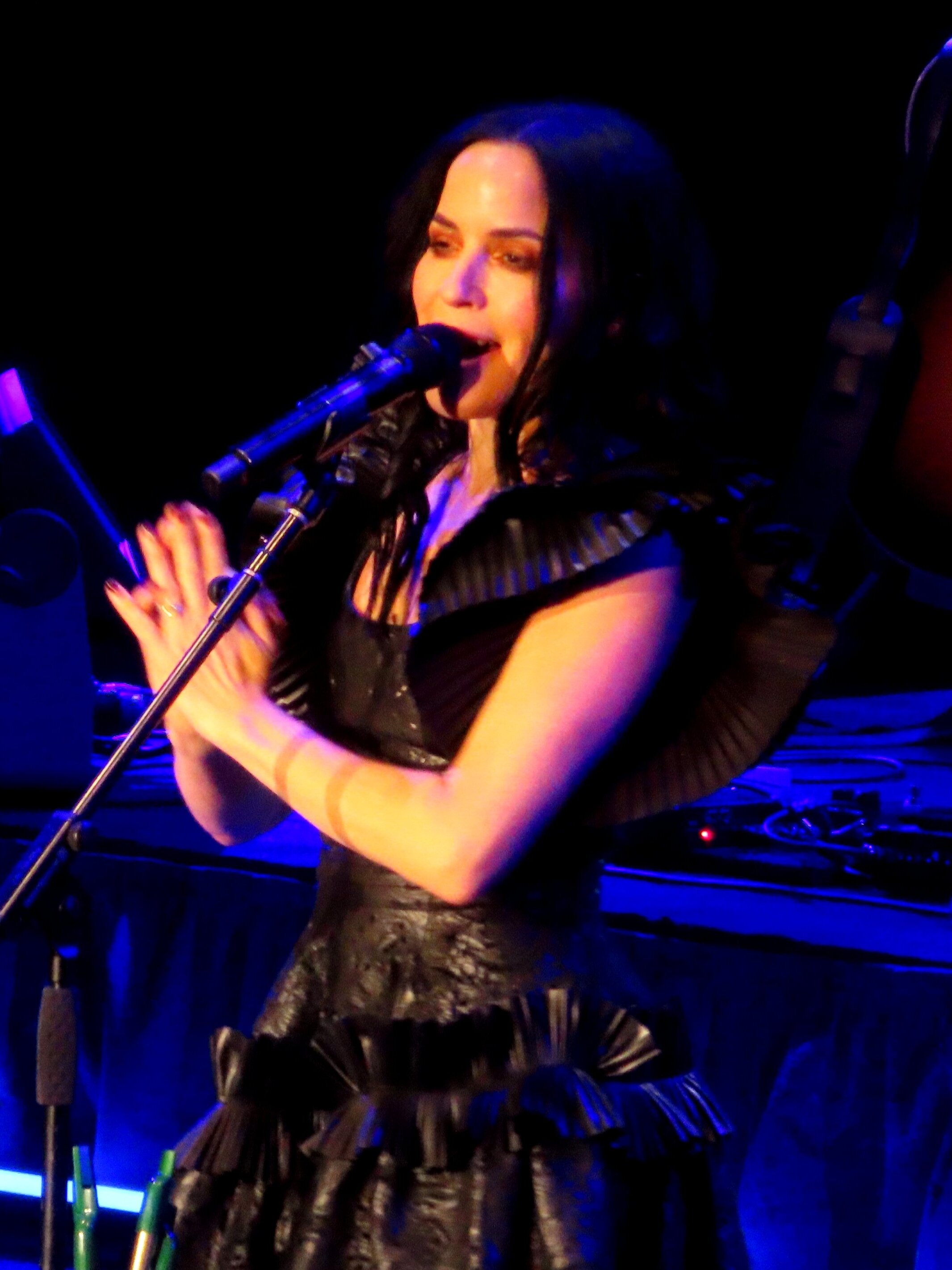
- Corr in 2024

Background information
- Born: Andrea Jane Corr; 17 May 1974 (age 52); Dundalk, County Louth, Ireland
- Genres: Pop; rock; Celtic
- Occupations: Musician; singer; actress
- Instruments: Vocals; tin whistle; mandolin; piano; ukulele
- Years active: 1990–present
- Labels: Atlantic; AC Records
- Member of: The Corrs

Andrea Jane Corr (born 17 May 1974) is an Irish musician and actress. Corr debuted in 1990 as the lead singer of the Celtic folk rock and pop rock group The Corrs along with her three elder siblings Caroline, Sharon and Jim. Aside from singing lead vocals, Corr plays the tin whistle, the ukulele and the piano.

With the others, Corr has released seven studio albums, two compilation albums, one remix album and two live albums. Corr has also pursued a solo career, releasing her debut album, Ten Feet High, in 2007. The album moved away from the sound of the Corrs and features a dance-pop sound. Her next album, released on 30 May 2011, was entirely made up of covers of songs that were important to her when younger.

Corr is involved in charitable activities. She has played charity concerts to raise money for the Pavarotti & Friends Liberian Children's Village, Freeman Hospital in Newcastle upon Tyne, England, the victims of the Omagh bombing in Northern Ireland and the Prince's Trust in 2004. She is an ambassador for the Nelson Mandela's "46664" campaign, raising awareness towards AIDS in Africa. During the Edinburgh Live 8 on 2 July 2005 The Corrs performed "When the Stars Go Blue" alongside Bono to promote the Make Poverty History campaign. Along with her siblings, she was appointed an honorary M.B.E. in 2005 by Queen Elizabeth II for her contribution to music and charity.

== Early years ==
Andrea Corr was born to Gerry Corr, a supervisor of a payroll unit of the Irish Electricity Supply Board (the E.S.B.), and his wife, Jean, a housewife. She is the youngest of the five Corr children. Older brother Gerard was killed when he was only three years old in a road accident before she and her sister Caroline were born. Andrea discussed the devastating death with Ryan Tubridy on The Late Late Show aired by RTÉ Entertainment.

The family was raised in Dundalk, Ireland. Gerry and Jean had their own band, Sound Affair, which played songs by ABBA, The Eagles, and other bands in local pubs in Dundalk, where they would often bring along their children.

With the encouragement of her parents, Andrea took up the tin whistle and was taught the piano by her father. Throughout their teenage years, she and her siblings would often practice in Jim's bedroom at a house he had rented. Andrea sang lead vocals, Sharon played the violin and both Caroline and Jim played keyboards. Andrea took part in school plays at her school, Dundalk's Dun Lughaidh Convent.

== Career ==
=== The Corrs ===
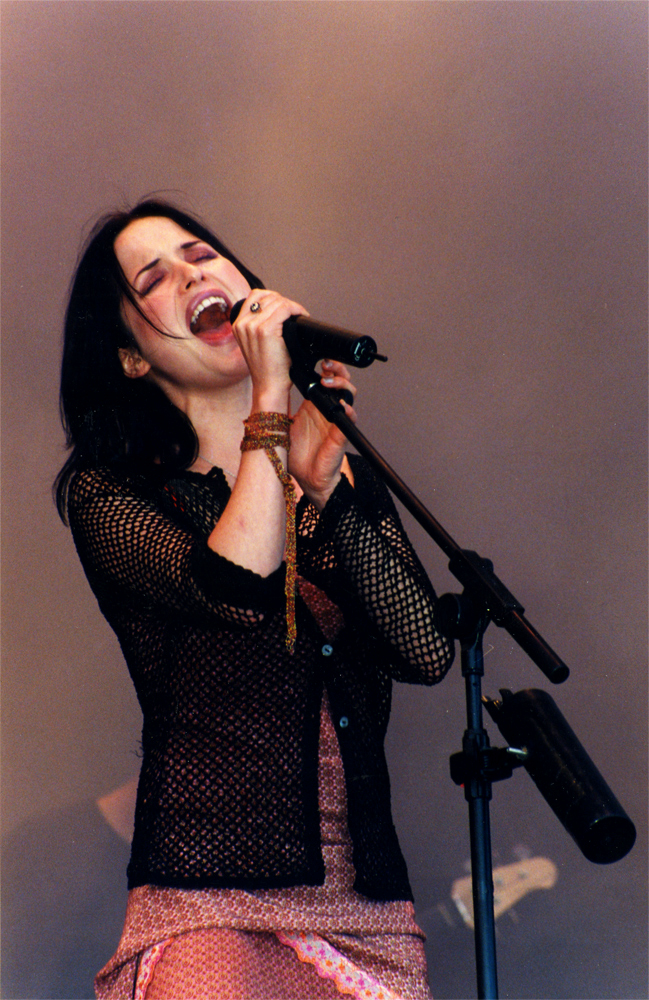
Corr in Glastonbury in 1999

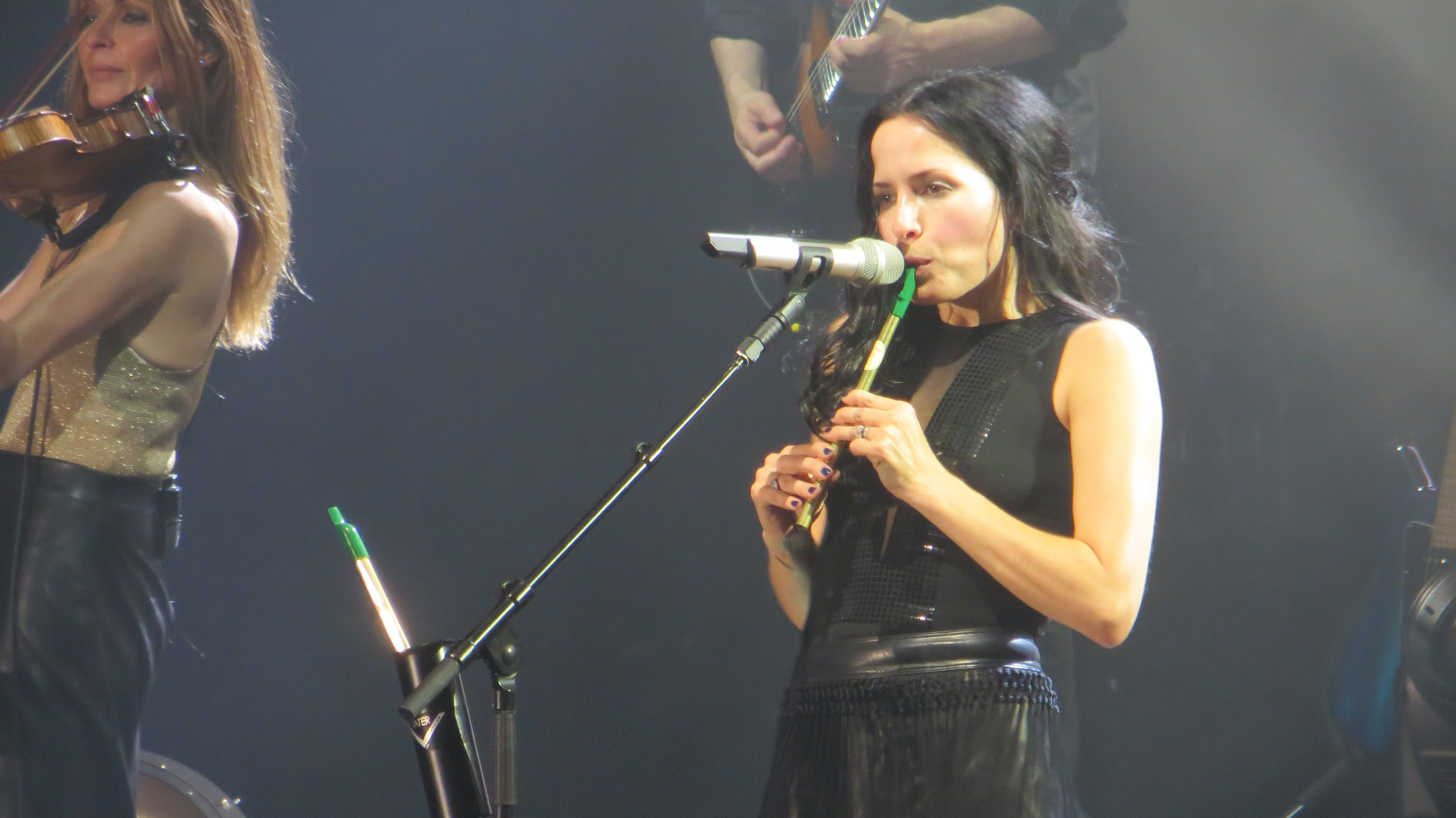
Corr performing in Vienna in 2016

In 1990, Corr and her siblings formed a quartet called The Corrs. Their career launched in 1991 when they auditioned for the film The Commitments in which Andrea gained a speaking role as Sharon Rabbitte. John Hughes noticed the quartet when they auditioned for the movie, and agreed to become their manager. The Corrs signed with Atlantic Records in 1995 and travelled to North America to record their debut album Forgiven, Not Forgotten. The album featured six instrumental selections among its Celtic-influenced tracks. When released, it was successful in Ireland, Australia, Japan, and Spain. The album reached platinum status in the United Kingdom and Australia, and quadruple platinum in Ireland, which made it one of the most popular debuts by an Irish group.

Following on from the success of their debut album, they released Talk on Corners and In Blue in 1997 and 2000 respectively. Originally Talk on Corners met with lukewarm success, until a remix version was released, when it topped the charts in many countries, and reached platinum status in the United Kingdom and Australia. In Blue moved towards mainstream pop, placing heavy emphasis on electronic synthesisers. It was successful, and was No. 1 in its first sales week in the UK, Ireland, Australia, Germany, Switzerland, and Austria and debuted at No. 2 in France and Norway. It climbed to the top position during its second week in Sweden and Spain.

During the production of In Blue, their mother, Jean, died while waiting for a lung transplant in the Freeman Hospital in Newcastle, UK. She was laid to rest at St. Patrick's cemetery in Dundalk. Bono, Larry Mullen, Brian Kennedy and Paul Brady were among the attendees. "No More Cry", written by Andrea and Caroline Corr for the album, was dedicated to their father hoping to help with his grief.

In 2003, Andrea recorded "Time Enough For Tears", a song written by Bono and Gavin Friday for the film In America. This track was featured on The Corrs' 2004 album Borrowed Heaven. Borrowed Heaven was dedicated to their late mother, Jean, and their father, Gerry. The band also dedicated their 2005 tribute album Home to their deceased mother. The band covered many traditional Irish songs taken from their mother's songbook to commemorate their 15 years as a band.

In an interview with Chris Evans in June 2015, Andrea confirmed that The Corrs were working on a new album and would play the BBC Radio 2 'Live in Hyde Park' festival. Their sixth studio album, White Light, was released on 27 November 2015, and was accompanied by a world tour.

In 2017 they released their latest album to date Jupiter Calling, produced by T-Bone Burnett.

=== Solo career ===
While her siblings were on hiatus to raise their families, Andrea launched a solo career. She released her first album, Ten Feet High, on 25 June 2007. It was produced by Nellee Hooper, who has worked with Gwen Stefani and Madonna; Bono was an executive producer. Her first single, "Shame on You" was an up-tempo pop song about men and women going to war and leaving behind partners they may never see again. It received positive reviews from music critics; IndieLondon described the song as a "slick package" that was "polished, well produced and with a message that's difficult to ignore". Losing Today's David Adair gave the song a strong review, writing that Corr's vocals were "crisp and uplifting". Liverpool's Daily Post gave the song a three-star rating, commenting that it was "deceptively upbeat", which masked its "heavier message about conscription and war".

In 2011 she released her second solo album Lifelines. This album contains covers of song by the likes John Lennon, Donna Summer, The Velvet Underground and more.

In 2020 she released an EP called Christmas Songs. The EP contains 4 classical Christmas songs and one original song titled Begin Again.

In 2025, Corr participated in the sixth series of The Masked Singer as "Snail". She was eliminated in the sixth episode alongside Grayson Perry as "Kingfisher".

=== Acting ===
Andrea Corr entered the film industry in 1991 with Alan Parker's film The Commitments, in which she had a speaking part as Sharon Rabbitte. In 1996, Parker was directing the film version of the rock opera Evita which starred Madonna. He was so keen on having Corr in the film that he cast her as Juan Peron's mistress, where she performed part of "Hello and Goodbye". Corr provided the singing voice for Kayley, opposite Bryan White (Garrett) in Warner Brothers' first fully animated film, 1998's The Quest for Camelot.

Corr resumed her acting career in 2003 where she was cast as Anne in The Boys from County Clare. The film was not a commercial success, but she won the Film Discovery Jury Award for Best Actress in the US Comedy Arts Festival and was nominated for Best Actress in the IFTA Awards. During the Corrs' hiatus she was featured in the 2005 film The Bridge and the 2006 film Broken Thread. Corr appeared as Christina in the play Dancing at Lughnasa staged at The Old Vic theatre in London from February until May 2009.

She played the title role in Jane Eyre by Alan Stanford at the Gate Theatre in Dublin which opened on 9 November 2010.

=== Book ===
In 2018 she wrote and released a book, titled Barefoot Pilgrimage. In this she writes about her youth, the warmth of her family, and about The Corrs.

== Charitable activities ==
Andrea Corr and her siblings have played charity concerts to raise money for the Pavarotti & Friends Liberian Children's Village, Freeman Hospital in Newcastle, the victims of the Omagh bombing in Northern Ireland, and The Prince's Trust in 2004. They are also ambassadors for the Nelson Mandela's "46664" campaign, where they performed live to raise awareness towards AIDS in Africa. During the Edinburgh Live 8 on 2 July 2005 The Corrs performed "When the Stars Go Blue" alongside Bono to promote the Make Poverty History campaign. In recognition for their charity performances, The Corrs were made Honorary Members of the Order of the British Empire in 2005 by Queen Elizabeth II.

Corr also partook in a tribute single to the late member of The Dubliners, Ronnie Drew, called "The Ballad of Ronnie Drew." The song was released on 19 February 2008 and was performed by a number of famous Irish musicians. This included members of U2, Sinéad O'Connor, Christy Dignam of Aslan, Robert Hunter of the Grateful Dead, who wrote the song, Kíla, Christy Moore, Moya Brennan, Shane MacGowan, Bob Geldof, Damien Dempsey, Gavin Friday, Iona Green, Jerry Fish, Paul Brady, Paddy Casey, Mick Pyro, Mundy, Chris de Burgh, Ronan Keating, Jack L, Eleanor Shanley, Mary Black, Declan O'Rourke, Mary Coughlan, Joe Elliott of Def Leppard, The Dubliners themselves and The Chieftains. The single was written to originally include Ronnie himself but was changed to be a tribute to him as his health was declining. Proceeds from sale of the single went to The Irish Cancer Society at the request of Drew himself. The song was performed live on The Late Late Show aired by RTÉ Entertainment on 22 February with Ronnie Drew in attendance as an audience member, and entered the Irish Single Charts at No. 2.

On 10 October 2010, Corr, amongst others, contributed to the Kirsty MacColl tribute concert held at Shepherd's Bush Empire to commemorate MacColl's birthday and raise money for charity. She also wrote and sang the song "Oh Brother" on the album Music of Ireland – Welcome Home.

On 30 November 2012, Corr lent her support to Kate Winslet's Golden Hat Foundation together with Tim Janis, Sarah McLachlan, Loreena McKennitt, Hayley Westenra, performing on "The American Christmas Carol" concert in Carnegie Hall.

== Personal life ==
Corr married Brett Desmond on 21 August 2009. In November 2011, Corr's pregnancy was announced. Corr gave birth to a daughter on 28 April 2012, and a son on 4 January 2014.

== Discography ==
=== Studio albums ===
List of studio albums, with selected details and chart positions
Title	Album details	Peak chart positions								
Title	Album details	IRE	IRE Indie	AUS	FRA	GER	NLD	SPA	SWI	UK
Ten Feet High	Released: 22 June 2007; Label: Atlantic; Formats: CD, digital download	24	–	98	128	86	84	9	42	38
Lifelines	Released: 29 May 2011; Label: AC Records; Formats: CD, CD+DVD, digital download	40	9	–	–	–	–	–	–	48
The Christmas Album	Released: 2 December 2022; Label: East West; Formats: CD, digital download	72	–	–	–	–	–	–	–	32

=== Extended plays ===
List of EP, with selected details
Title	Details
Christmas Songs	Released: 2020; Label: East West; Formats: Digital download

=== Singles ===
List of singles, with selected chart positions
Title	Year	Peak chart positions			Album
Title	Year	IRE	SPA	UK	Album
"All I Have to Do Is Dream" (with Laurent Voulzy)	2006	–	–	–	La Septième Vague
"Shame on You"	2007	43	20	108	Ten Feet High
"Champagne from a Straw"	2007	–	–	–	Ten Feet High
"Tinseltown in the Rain"	2011	–	–	–	Lifelines
"Pale Blue Eyes" / "Blue Bayou"	2011	–	–	–	Lifelines

== Filmography ==
Year	Title	Role
1991	The Commitments	Sharon Rabbitte
1996	Evita	Juan Peron's mistress
1998	Quest for Camelot	Kayley (singing voice)
2003	The Boys from County Clare	Anne
2005	The Bridge	Mary
2006	Broken Thread	Lily
2009	Pictures	Donna

== Stage roles ==
Year	Title	Role
2010	Jane Eyre The Gate Theatre	Jane Eyre
2009	Dancing at Lughnasa The Old Vic theatre	Christina "Chris" Mundy
