= The Very Best of Enya =

Greatest hits album by Enya
- Released: 23 November 2009
- Recorded: 1986–2008
- Genres: New-age; Celtic; ambient
- Length: 1:03:17 (CD); 2:24:19 (DVD)
- Labels: Warner Bros.; Reprise
- Producer: Nicky Ryan

Enya chronology
And Winter Came... (2008)	The Very Best of Enya (2009)	Dark Sky Island (2015)

The Very Best of Enya is the second greatest hits album by the Irish singer and composer Enya, released on 23 November 2009 by Warner Bros. Records.

The album received mostly positive reviews from music critics and peaked at number 32 on the UK Albums Chart and number 55 on the Billboard 200 in the United States. It has spent over 200 weeks Billboard New Age Albums chart, more than 130 of them at No 1, and has topped the year-end chart consistently since 2020.

== Release and reception ==
Professional ratings
Review scores
Source	Rating
AllMusic	4/5 stars

The album was released on 23 November 2009 by Warner Music internationally and on 1 December 2009 by Reprise Records in the United States. It peaked at number 32 on the UK Albums Chart and number 55 on the Billboard 200 in the United States. It spent over 100 weeks at number one on the Billboard New Age Albums chart.

The Very Best of Enya received mostly positive reviews from music critics. James Christopher Monger of AllMusic wrote that the collection "was one of those rare 'greatest-hits' collections that goes deep without depriving the listener of the essentials. With tunes like 'Orinoco Flow', 'Caribbean Blue' and 'Book of Days' in the pot and out of the way, it's easier to appreciate hidden gems like 'Cursum Perficio', 'Boadicea', 'Trains and Winter Rains' and 'Anywhere Is'."

== Track listing ==
The Very Best of Enya — Standard Edition
No.	Title	From the album	Length
1.	"Orinoco Flow"	Watermark	4:29
2.	"Aníron (I Desire)" (Previously unreleased version)	The Lord of the Rings: The Fellowship of the Ring – Original Motion Picture Soundtrack	2:42
3.	"Storms in Africa"	Watermark	4:04
4.	"Caribbean Blue"	Shepherd Moons	3:58
5.	"Book of Days"	Shepherd Moons	2:55
6.	"The Celts"	Enya	2:55
7.	"Only Time"	A Day Without Rain	3:36
8.	"Wild Child"	A Day Without Rain	3:46
9.	"Water Shows the Hidden Heart"	Amarantine	4:38
10.	"Anywhere Is"	The Memory of Trees	3:57
11.	"Cursum Perficio"	Watermark	4:07
12.	"Amarantine"	Amarantine	3:09
13.	"Aldebaran"	Enya	3:05
14.	"Trains and Winter Rains"	And Winter Came...	3:42
15.	"Watermark"	Watermark	2:25
16.	"Boadicea"	Enya	3:31
17.	"A Day Without Rain"	A Day Without Rain	2:35
18.	"May It Be"	The Lord of the Rings: The Fellowship of the Ring – Original Motion Picture Soundtrack	3:31
Total length:			1:03:59

The Very Best of Enya — US Edition
No.	Title	From the album	Length
19.	"Oíche Chiúin (Chorale)"	And Winter Came...	3:31

The Very Best of Enya — Canadian Edition
No.	Title	From the album	Length
20.	"How Can I Keep From Singing?"	Shepherd Moons	4:26

The Very Best of Enya — Japanese Edition
No.	Title	From the album	Length
19.	"To Go Beyond (Part II)"	Enya	2:50
20.	"Only If..."	Paint the Sky with Stars	3:19
21.	"Dreams Are More Precious"	And Winter Came...	4:25

The Very Best of Enya — Limited and Deluxe Edition CD
No.	Title	From the album	Length
1.	"Trains and Winter Rains"	And Winter Came...
2.	"My! My! Time Flies!"	And Winter Came...
3.	"Stars and Midnight Blue"	And Winter Came...
4.	"Amarantine"	Amarantine
5.	"Sumiregusa"	Amarantine
6.	"The River Sings"	Amarantine
7.	"If I Could Be Where You Are"	Amarantine
8.	"Wild Child"	A Day Without Rain
9.	"Only Time"	A Day Without Rain
10.	"Drifting"	Amarantine
11.	"Flora's Secret"	A Day Without Rain
12.	"Fallen Embers"	A Day Without Rain
13.	"One by One"	A Day Without Rain
14.	"Pax Deorum"	The Memory of Trees
15.	"Athair ar Neamh"	The Memory of Trees
16.	"Anywhere Is"	The Memory of Trees
17.	"Orinoco Flow"	Watermark
18.	"Watermark"	Watermark
19.	"Boadicea"	Enya
20.	"May It Be"	The Lord of the Rings: The Fellowship of the Ring – Original Motion Picture Soundtrack
21.	"Caribbean Blue"	Shepherd Moons
22.	"Aníron (I Desire)"	The Lord of the Rings: The Fellowship of the Ring – Original Motion Picture Soundtrack

iTunes and Spotify release bonus track
No.	Title	From the album	Length
23.	"Oíche Chiúin (Chorale)"	And Winter Came...	3:49

Amazon MP3 release bonus tracks
No.	Title	From the album	Length
23.	"Oíche Chiúin (Chorale)"	And Winter Came...	3:49
24.	"Only Time (Remix)"	Only Time	3:13

The Very Best of Enya — Limited and Deluxe Edition DVD
No.	Title	Length
1.	"Orinoco Flow"	3:44
2.	"Caribbean Blue"	3:38
3.	"Only Time"	3:38
4.	"The Celts"	3:08
5.	"Amarantine"	3:05
6.	"Trains and Winter Rains"	3:17
7.	"Evening Falls"	3:50
8.	"Anywhere Is"	3:47
9.	"It's in the Rain"	3:47
10.	"Wild Child"	3:33
11.	"Only If"	3:16
12.	"Storms in Africa"	2:59
13.	"On My Way Home"	4:26
Total length:		46:06

The Very Best of Enya — Limited and Deluxe Edition DVD Additional Content
No.	Title	Length
1.	"Enya: A Life In Music" (documentary)	16:10
2.	"Caribbean Blue" (making of)	10:13
3.	"Only Time" (making of)	9:03
Total length:		35:26

== Personnel ==
Credits adapted from Allmusic and the album's sleeve notes.

Musicians

- Enya – vocals
- Nicky Ryan - additional vocals
- Roma Ryan - additional vocals

Production

- Enya - lyrics written by (6-8, 13), music composed by (1-18), musical arrangement
- Nicky Ryan – lyrics written by (7), music composed by (1, 3-18), musical arrangement, producer, recording engineer
- Roma Ryan – lyrics written by (1-15, 18), quotation author
- Franz Gruber - lyrics written by, music composed by (NA19)
- Traditional - lyrics written by, music composed by (NA19)
- Daniel Polley – digital technical advisor
- Dick Beetham – mastering at 360 Mastering, London
- Peacock – art direction, design
- Simon Fowler – photography
- David Scheinmann – photography
- Russell Young – photography
- Max Adelman – photography
- Ruth Rowland – lettering

== Charts ==
=== Weekly charts ===
Weekly chart performance for The Very Best of Enya
Chart (2009–2023)	Peak position
Argentine Albums (CAPIF)	10
Australian Albums (ARIA)	19
Austrian Albums (Ö3 Austria)	18
Belgian Albums (Ultratop Flanders)	2
Belgian Albums (Ultratop Wallonia)	19
Canadian Albums (Billboard)	23
Czech Albums (ČNS IFPI)	6
Danish Albums (Hitlisten)	12
Dutch Albums (Album Top 100)	11
Dutch CombiAlbum (Dutch Charts)	95
Europe (European Top 100 Albums)	18
German Albums (Offizielle Top 100)	19
Greek Albums (IFPI)	9
Hungarian Albums (MAHASZ)	14
Irish Albums (IRMA)	22
Italian Albums (FIMI)	34
Japanese Albums (Oricon)	6
Mexican Albums (Top 100 Mexico)	60
New Zealand Albums (RMNZ)	6
Norwegian Albums (VG-lista)	14
Polish Albums (ZPAV)	23
Portuguese Albums (AFP)	13
Spanish Albums (Promusicae)	11
Swedish Albums (Sverigetopplistan)	20
Swiss Albums (Schweizer Hitparade)	8
UK Albums (Official Charts)	32
US Billboard 200	55
US New Age Albums (Billboard)	1

=== Year-end charts ===
2009 year-end chart performance for The Very Best of Enya
Chart (2009)	Position
Belgian Albums (Ultratop Flanders)	87
New Zealand Albums (RMNZ)	31
UK Albums (OCC)	157

2010 year-end chart performance for The Very Best of Enya
Chart (2010)	Position
Belgian Albums (Ultratop Flanders)	10
Belgian Albums (Ultratop Wallonia)	69
Dutch Albums (Album Top 100)	64
Swiss Albums (Schweizer Hitparade)	68

== Certifications and sales ==
Certifications and sales for The Very Best of Enya
Region	Certification	Certified units/sales
Australia (ARIA)	Gold	35,000^{^}
Belgium (BRMA)	Gold	15,000^{*}
Denmark (IFPI Danmark)	Platinum	20,000^{‡}
Germany (BVMI)	Gold	100,000^{^}
Ireland (IRMA)	Gold	7,500^{^}
Italy (FIMI)	Gold	30,000^{*}
New Zealand (RMNZ)	Platinum	15,000^{^}
Poland (ZPAV)	Gold	10,000^{*}
Spain (Promusicae)	Gold	30,000^{^}
United Kingdom (BPI)	Platinum	300,000^{‡}
Summaries
Worldwide	—	905,000
^{*} Sales figures based on certification alone.^{^} Shipments figures based on certification alone.^{‡} Sales+streaming figures based on certification alone.

== Release history ==
Release history for The Very Best of Enya
Country	Date	Format	Label
Various	23 November 2009	CD; digital download	Warner Bros.
United States	1 December 2009	CD; digital download	Reprise
Various	25 August 2017	LP	Warner Bros.; Reprise
