= Dark Sky Island =

Studio album by Enya
- Released: 20 November 2015
- Recorded: 2012–2015
- Studios: Aigle Studio, Killiney, Ireland
- Genres: New-age; Celtic
- Length: 44:05 (Standard edition); 54:36 (Deluxe edition)
- Label: Warner Bros.
- Producer: Nicky Ryan

Enya chronology
The Very Best of Enya (2009)	Dark Sky Island (2015)

Singles from Dark Sky Island
- 1. "Echoes in Rain" Released: 9 October 2015

Dark Sky Island is the eighth studio album by Irish singer and composer Enya, released on 20 November 2015 by Warner Bros. Records. After the release of her previous album, And Winter Came... (2008), Enya was unsure of her next career move, so she decided to take a break from music, which lasted three years. In the spring of 2012, she started to write and record new material for a new album with her longtime collaborators, producer and arranger Nicky Ryan, and his wife, lyricist Roma Ryan. Enya gained inspiration for the title track and the album from the 2011 designation of Sark in the Channel Islands as a dark-sky preserve and a collection of Roma Ryan's poems on islands.

Dark Sky Island received positive reviews from critics and was a commercial success upon release. It peaked at No. 4 on the UK Albums Chart, Enya's highest position on the chart since Paint the Sky with Stars (1997), and No. 8 on the Billboard 200 in the United States. Elsewhere, it reached the top five in nine countries. A deluxe edition features three additional tracks. Enya promoted the album with a worldwide media tour that included performances of some songs from the album. Dark Sky Island was nominated for a Grammy Award for Best New Age Album.

== Background and recording ==
Following the release of her winter-themed album And Winter Came... (2008), Enya was unsure on her next career move. Among the options she considered was to take a "proper break" away from activity, which she decided to do and lasted three years. She felt it was needed for herself and her music. During this period she released her second greatest hits album, The Very Best of Enya (2009) and spent time travelling, including visits to Ireland, Australia and France, where she bought a new home on its southern coast and renovated it. Enya also caught up with her longtime collaborators, producer and arranger Nicky Ryan and his wife, lyricist Roma Ryan, to discuss ideas on the next album and when to start work. At one meeting, Roma presented Enya with a collection of poems she had written about islands, one of which was about Sark in the English Channel, and spoke about its designation as the first island to become a dark-sky preserve in 2011. Enya was inspired by the idea to start writing new music, but had to wait until renovation work was complete at Aigle Studio, the Ryans' home studio in Killiney, County Dublin. In May 2011, Ryan announced that work on a new album had started, early plans for which included orchestral and choral arrangements recorded at Abbey Road Studios in London that never came into fruition. In the spring of 2012, Enya felt the time was right to start recording. Enya said the album has an underlying theme of journeys: "Journeys to the island; through the length of a lifetime; through history, through emotions; and journeys across great oceans", yet denies it is a concept album.

The album was recorded from 2012 to 2015. Enya and the Ryans adopted their usual method of writing and recording for Dark Sky Island. The process began with Enya working alone, recording ideas in the form of basic melodies or sketches of ideas on the piano. She would arrive at the studio at 10 a.m. and work until around 6 p.m. and have weekends off. Enya is a self-described "very slow writer" and did not give herself a deadline to have a set number of songs complete by. At times when a strong enough idea had not arrived after some weeks, Nicky would encourage her to continue. She added: "It's a day closer to writing and finding what I'm trying to say and express within the music." After a collection of ideas have been put down Enya would present them to Nicky and Roma "to see [whether] they understand what I'm trying to say [...] to see, emotionally, that they sense what the song is about. And then we know we have a song for the album." The album's eleven tracks, plus three bonus tracks, were all the songs that Enya had written in the three-year period.

== Songs ==
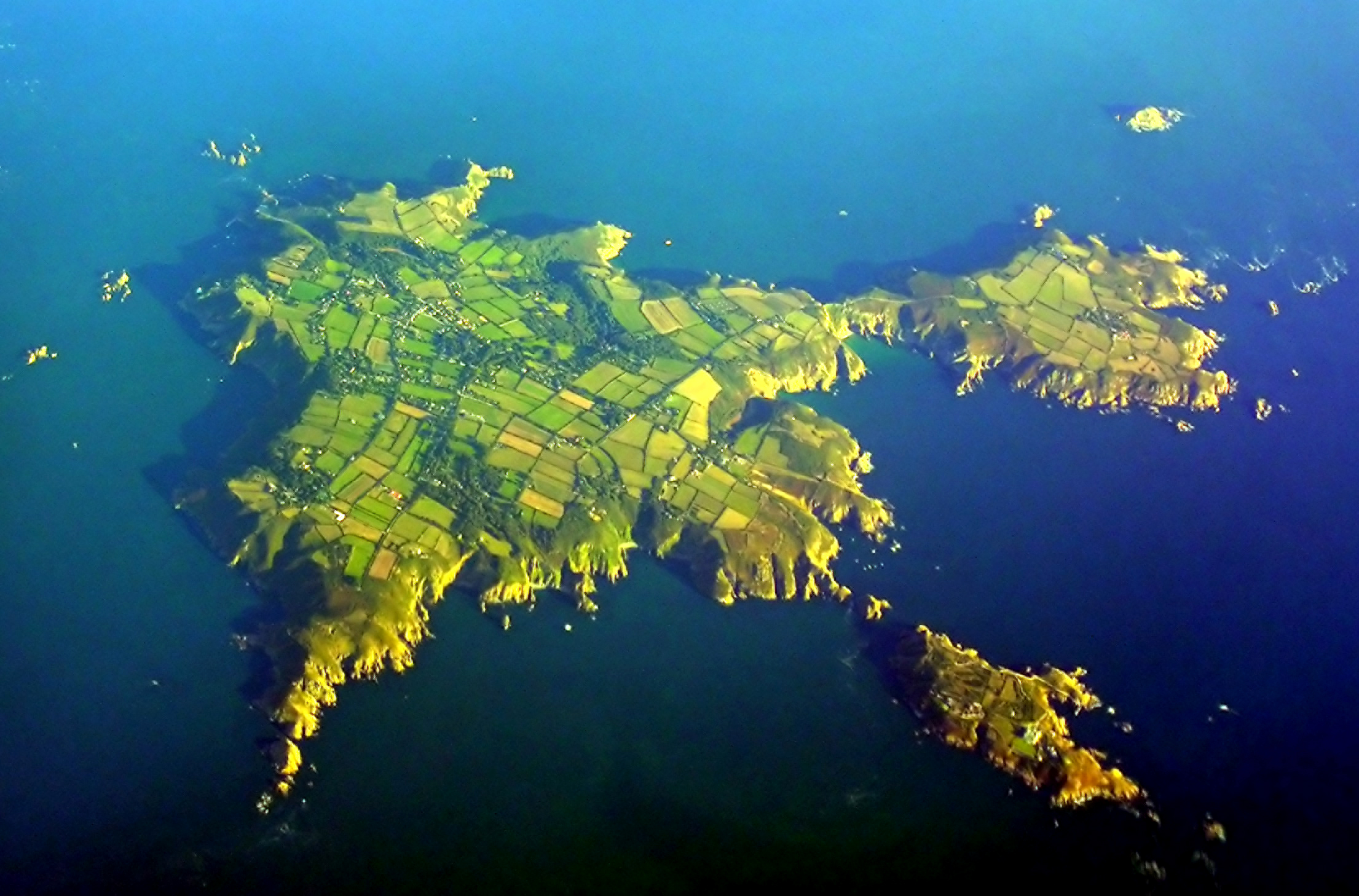
The title track was inspired by Sark island

The title track "Dark Sky Island" was the first to be written. It is a gentle, story-like song, which also mentions various constellation names. Another notable song is "The Humming...", which is a song "that muses on the cycle of the universe and how change affects everything". It is composed in the key of G♯ minor. While Enya was working on the music, there was a part that she started to hum to and decided to keep the section as the humming part. She had read a story that Roma had given her about the earliest sound in the universe was a humming sound, which Nicky said was around forty-seven octaves below the lowest piano key". The sound was inaudible to humans until scientists took the information picked up by the Planck space telescope and reproduced it through audio compression and pitch alteration, which created a humming sound and gave the track a fitting title.

"So I Could Find My Way" is set in waltz time and composed in the key of D major. Enya described the melody as "very emotional". The song is dedicated to Nicky Ryan's deceased mother Mona. Enya describes its subject of "a mother moving on" as "something quite universal ... You think about what she left behind in your life. That's what you'll always remember. What her stories were, what she was hoping for you; hoping you'd find your way".

"Even in the Shadows" features a double bass played by Irish rock and jazz musician Eddie Lee. Lee was a member of Those Nervous Animals from Sligo, Ireland. The band were label mates with the Brennan family band Clannad under the Tara Music label in the 1980s; Enya was a temporary member of Clannad from 1980 until 1982.

There are two songs on the album that feature lyrics in Loxian, a language created by Roma Ryan, for the first time since Amarantine (2005). These songs in particular focus on the "intergalactic theme" and otherworldly and futuristic tales Roma Ryan uses Loxian for, along with the non-Loxian "Astra et Luna".

"Echoes in Rain" is in a minor scale, specifically F♯ minor (the parallel minor to A major) and has a sort of "marching rhythm celebrating a journey's end". The song includes a complex piano-based bridge similar to Enya's solo piano tracks on her earlier albums. Enya's vocals span two octaves from B2 to E5. The lyrics describe the subtle thrill of journeying home after a long time away, travelling through night into the next day. The verses detail how the changes of the natural surroundings and the elated feeling throughout the journey home. It was the final song written for the album.

"I Could Never Say Goodbye" is an Irish lament with "a sparse, hymnal arrangement".

"Sancta Maria" blends synthesizers and classical instrumentation.

== Promotion ==
The album was announced by Enya on her website in September 2015. The title, first single and track listing were announced on 7 October 2015. Along with standard and deluxe editions on digital formats, a vinyl edition was made available, making Dark Sky Island Enya's first vinyl release since her self-titled album's re-release in 1992.

In the weeks preceding Dark Sky Island's release, Enya's various official social media accounts posted interviews with Enya and her lyricist Roma Ryan, previews for the album, exclusive photos and 'behind the scenes' moments, lyric and regular music videos, and information on iTunes' exclusive early releases of the album's songs. This is the first use of social media to promote Enya's music as well as using it for giving fans exclusive, official information and content.

Embarking upon the promotional trip for Dark Sky Island, Enya herself initially promoted the album in Britain and Ireland, being interviewed for The Irish Times, before guesting on Lorraine and on BBC Radio 4's BBC Front Row on 19 November 2015, and on other major radio shows like The Chris Evans Breakfast Show on BBC Radio 2 and Gerry Kelly's show on BBC Radio Ulster upon the album's release day. She then promoted the album worldwide with interviews in Japan and the US on news and morning television.

On 13 December 2015, Enya gave a surprise performance at the Universal Studios Japan Christmas Show in Osaka, Japan, of two songs—"Orinoco Flow" and "Echoes in Rain", as a "surprise gift" to her Japanese fans. She also complimented the "spectacular" celebrations of that day.

Enya was interviewed twice in 2016; on 18 January by Russell Davies on BBC Radio 2's The Art of Artists. and on 2 March by Simon Mayo on BBC Radio 2's Simon Mayo Drivetime after guesting on This Morning.

To promote the album in the United States, Enya performed "Echoes in Rain" on Live! with Kelly and Michael, "Even in the Shadows" on Good Day New York and was interviewed on HuffPost Live. She would perform the song again at the 2016 ECHO Awards.

== Release ==
Dark Sky Island was released on CD and as a digital download on 20 November 2015. It was released on LP on 18 December 2015.

Two promotional singles from the album were released. "So I Could Find My Way" was released digitally on 30 October 2015. Its music video, released on 6 November, features Enya performing in the Chapel Royal Church in Dublin with a female string ensemble and choir. "The Humming..." was released digitally on 13 November with an accompanying lyric video released the same day.

Dark Sky Island entered the UK Albums Chart at No. 4, Enya's highest-charting album there since Paint the Sky with Stars (1997). In the United States, Dark Sky Island debuted at number 8 on the Billboard 200, with 48,000 equivalent album units; it sold 46,000 copies in its first week of release.

Dark Sky Island ended 2015 as the 40th best selling album of the year with sales of 900,000 copies worldwide.

== Reception ==
Professional ratings
Aggregate scores
Source	Rating
AnyDecentMusic?	6.7/10
Metacritic	78/100
Review scores
Source	Rating
AllMusic	4/5 stars
Drowned in Sound	8/10
Evening Standard	4/5 stars
Fort Worth Star-Telegram	3/4 stars
The Irish Times	4/5 stars
Música Nueva	4.5/5 stars
Newsday	B+
The Observer	3/5 stars
Pitchfork	7.1/10
The Telegraph	4/5 stars

Dark Sky Island received mostly positive reviews from music critics. At Metacritic, which assigns a normalised rating out of 100 to reviews from mainstream critics, the album received an average score of 78, which indicates "generally favourable reviews", based on 8 reviews. In his review for AllMusic, Timothy Monger rated the album four stars out of five. He wrote the album "has all the thematic and sonic hallmarks typical of an Enya release but with significantly more highlights than on her two prior works" and highlights "The Humming" as "one of the strongest tracks she's produced in decades and resembles a dark cousin to 1991's masterwork 'Caribbean Blue'". He summarised the album "does manage to harness some of the power and creativity of Enya's early days and pairs it with both the confidence and shadows of age". In the Evening Standard, John Aizlewood gave the album the same rating, calling it "magnificent in every sense" with "songs built up with layer upon layer of vocals ... layer upon layer of instrumentation and layer upon layer of luxurious, uplifting, undeniably spiritual warmth".

Siobhan Kane of The Irish Times rated the album four stars out of five, praising Enya's vocal power "that manages to be both frail and strong" on "So I Could Find My Way", and summarised the album as "nourishing and immersive". Brad Nelson in his review for Pitchfork, likened the album to "being embraced by air" and said with "some confidence" that Dark Sky Island was Enya's best album since The Memory of Trees (1995), released almost twenty years prior; he gave a positive review and score of 7.1 out of 10. He praised Enya for "drifting somewhat from her aesthetic" and highlighted "Even in the Shadows" as a prime example and consequently called it "one of the best [songs] on the album".

== Track listing ==
All music by Enya, lyrics by Roma Ryan, all songs produced by Nicky Ryan.

Dark Sky Island – Standard edition
No.	Title	Length
1.	"The Humming"	3:45
2.	"So I Could Find My Way"	4:25
3.	"Even in the Shadows"	4:14
4.	"The Forge of the Angels"	5:14
5.	"Echoes in Rain"	3:35
6.	"I Could Never Say Goodbye"	3:29
7.	"Dark Sky Island"	4:57
8.	"Sancta Maria"	3:51
9.	"Astra et Luna"	3:21
10.	"The Loxian Gates"	3:34
11.	"Diamonds on the Water"	3:35
Total length:		44:05

Dark Sky Island – Deluxe edition (bonus tracks)
No.	Title	Length
12.	"Solace"	3:58
13.	"Pale Grass Blue"	3:34
14.	"Remember Your Smile"	2:57
Total length:		54:36

== Personnel ==
Credits are adapted from the album's 2015 liner notes.

Musicians

- Enya – vocals, instrumentation, mixer
- Eddie Lee – double bass on "Even in the Shadows"

Production

- Roma Ryan – lyrics, Loxian language, font
- Nicky Ryan – arrangement, engineer, mixer, album sleeve conception
- Dick Beetham – mastering at 360 Mastering in Hastings
- Daniel Polley – digital advisor, technician
- Simon Fowler – album sleeve conception, photography
- Richard Welland – booklet layout
- Michael Whitham – commissioner

== Charts ==
=== Weekly charts ===
Weekly chart performance for Dark Sky Island
Chart (2015–16)	Peak position
Australian Albums (ARIA)	8
Austrian Albums (Ö3 Austria)	6
Belgian Albums (Ultratop Flanders)	3
Belgian Albums (Ultratop Wallonia)	3
Canadian Albums (Billboard)	6
Croatian International Albums (HDU)	16
Czech Albums (ČNS IFPI)	6
Danish Albums (Hitlisten)	21
Dutch Albums (Album Top 100)	5
Finnish Albums (Suomen virallinen lista)	23
French Albums (SNEP)	31
German Albums (Offizielle Top 100)	3
Greek Albums (IFPI Greece)	66
Hungarian Albums (MAHASZ)	4
Irish Albums (IRMA)	7
Italian Albums (FIMI)	8
Japanese Albums (Oricon)	17
Mexican Albums (AMPROFON)	55
New Zealand Albums (RMNZ)	8
Norwegian Albums (VG-lista)	13
Polish Albums (ZPAV)	14
Portuguese Albums (AFP)	13
Scottish Albums (Official Charts)	7
Spanish Albums (Promusicae)	12
South African Albums (RISA)	20
South Korean Albums (Gaon)	23
Swedish Albums (Sverigetopplistan)	22
Swiss Albums (Schweizer Hitparade)	2
UK Albums (Official Charts)	4
UK Album Downloads (Official Charts)	7
US Billboard 200	8

- The album also peaked at number one on the Billboard Top New Age Albums chart for ten consecutive weeks after its release.

=== Year-end charts ===
2015 year-end chart performance for Dark Sky Island
Chart (2015)	Position
Australian Albums (ARIA)	50
Belgian Albums (Ultratop Flanders)	48
Belgian Albums (Ultratop Wallonia)	59
Dutch Albums (Album Top 100)	20
French Albums (SNEP)	160
German Albums (Official Top 100)	36
Hungarian Albums (MAHASZ)	15
Italian Albums (FIMI)	99
New Zealand Albums (RMNZ)	30
Spanish Albums (Promusicae)	89
Swiss Albums (Schweizer Hitparade)	63
UK Albums (OCC)	29

2016 year-end chart performance for Dark Sky Island
Chart (2016)	Position
Belgian Albums (Ultratop Flanders)	39
Belgian Albums (Ultratop Wallonia)	40
Hungarian Albums (MAHASZ)	32
Swiss Albums (Schweizer Hitparade)	41
US New Age Albums (Billboard)	1
US Billboard 200	191

== Certifications and sales ==
Certifications and sales for Dark Sky Island
Region	Certification	Certified units/sales
Australia (ARIA)	Gold	35,000^{^}
Belgium (BRMA)	Gold	15,000^{*}
Canada (Music Canada)	Gold	40,000^{^}
Germany (BVMI)	Gold	100,000^{‡}
Hungary (MAHASZ)	Platinum	2,000^{^}
Italy (FIMI)	Gold	25,000^{‡}
Japan	—	50,000
New Zealand (RMNZ)	Gold	7,500^{^}
South Korea	—	925
Switzerland (IFPI Switzerland)	Gold	10,000^{^}
United Kingdom (BPI)	Gold	100,000^{*}
Summaries
Worldwide	—	900,000
^{*} Sales figures based on certification alone.^{^} Shipments figures based on certification alone.^{‡} Sales+streaming figures based on certification alone.

== Release history ==
Region	Date	Edition(s)	Format(s)	Label	Ref.
Various	20 November 2015	Standard; deluxe	CD; digital download	Warner Bros.	
Various	18 December 2015	Standard	LP	Warner Bros.	
