= List of albums certified by the Irish Recorded Music Association =

The following is a list of albums that have been certified Gold, Platinum, and Multi-platinum by the Irish Recorded Music Association.

== Gold ==
- Accelerate
- Aerial
- All I Ever Wanted
- Animal
- The Annie Lennox Collection
- As I Am
- Battle Born
- Beyoncé
- DNA
- Dreams: The Ultimate Corrs Collection
- The Family Jewels
- Femme Fatale
- Flamingo
- Glee: The Music, The Christmas Album
- Glee: The Music, Volume 4
- Here I Stand
- Keeps Gettin' Better: A Decade of Hits
- The Lady Killer
- Most Wanted
- My December
- One Love
- Picture This
- Plastic Beach
- Simply Deep
- Sleep Through the Static
- Sorry for Party Rocking
- Surprise
- Sticks + Stones
- Talkie Walkie
- The Ballads
- The Very Best of Enya
- Walking on a Dream
- Working Class Hero: The Definitive Lennon
- X

== Platinum ==
- 4
- 21st Century Breakdown
- Absolute Greatest
- AM
- Amarantine
- And Winter Came...
- Blackout
- Breakout
- Brother
- Change
- Circus
- Dua Lipa
- Electra Heart
- Complete Clapton
- The Defamation of Strickland Banks
- Froot
- Dylan
- Echo
- Funhouse
- Get Weird
- Greatest Hits (Journey)
- Greatest Hits (Mariah Carey)
- I Look to You
- Infinity on High
- Iron Man 2
- La Roux
- Messy Little Raindrops
- No Line on the Horizon
- Nothing but the Beat
- One of the Boys
- Outta This World
- PCD
- Rated R
- Shepherd Moons
- The Soul Sessions
- Stripped
- This Is It
- We Started Nothing

== Multi-platinum ==
=== Two times ===
- 3 Words
- A Girl Like Me
- Born This Way
- Fearless
- Glory Days
- Greatest Hits (Bon Jovi)
- Greatest Hits (Enrique Iglesias)
- Home
- I Am... Sasha Fierce
- It's Not Me, It's You
- In Case You Didn't Know
- Mine & Yours
- My Christmas
- Mylo Xyloto
- Now That's What I Call Music! 78
- Oral Fixation Vol. 2
- Overcome
- Planet Jedward
- Taller in More Ways
- Teenage Dream
- Ultimate Collection (Eurythmics)
- Up All Night
- The Ultimate Collection (Whitney Houston)
- Up to Now
- Victory
- Who You Are
- Working on a Dream

=== Three times ===
- B'Day
- Back to Basics
- Ceremonials
- Greatest Hits (Shania Twain)
- Love. Angel. Music. Baby.
- Ultimate Kylie
- Talk That Talk

=== Four times ===
- 1989
- Day & Age
- Doo-Wops & Hooligans
- Fallen
- Lungs
- Piece by Piece
- Sunny Side Up
- Sam's Town
- Viva la Vida or Death and All His Friends

=== Five times ===
- Eye to the Telescope
- Good Girl Gone Bad
- Loud
- Now That's What I Call Music! 74
- Now That's What I Call Music! 80
- Only by the Night
- Science & Faith
- This Is It

=== Six times ===
- Greatest Hits: My Prerogative
- +
- Greatest Hits (Guns N' Roses)
- Gold: Greatest Hits (ABBA)
- Now That's What I Call Music! 77
- Progress
- U218 Singles
- (What's the Story) Morning Glory?

=== Seven times ===
- Breakaway
- Christmas
- Eyes Open
- Hot Fuss
- Spirit

=== Eight times ===
- The Circus
- Face to Face
- I Dreamed a Dream
- X&Y

=== Nine times ===
- The Fame
- Spice

=== Thirteen times ===
- Forgiven, Not Forgotten

=== Fourteen times ===
- X

=== 15 times ===
- Crazy Love

=== 20 times ===
- Talk on Corners

=== 23 times ===
- White Ladder
