= The Memory of Trees =

Studio album by Enya
- Released: 20 November 1995
- Recorded: 1993–1995
- Studios: Aigle (Killiney, County Dublin, Ireland)
- Genres: New age; Celtic; instrumental
- Length: 43:50
- Labels: WEA (UK); Reprise (US)
- Producer: Nicky Ryan

Enya chronology
Shepherd Moons (1991)	The Memory of Trees (1995)	Paint the Sky with Stars (1997)

Singles from The Memory of Trees
- 1. "Anywhere Is" Released: 6 November 1995; 2. "On My Way Home" Released: 10 June 1996

The Memory of Trees is the fourth studio album by Irish singer and composer Enya, released on 20 November 1995 by WEA. After travelling worldwide to promote her previous album Shepherd Moons (1991), and contributing to film soundtracks, Enya took a short break before she started writing and recording a new album in 1993 with her longtime recording partners, arranger and producer Nicky Ryan and his wife, lyricist Roma Ryan. The album is Enya's first to be recorded entirely in Ireland, and covers themes that include Irish and Druid mythology, the idea of one's home, journeys, religion, dreams, and love. Enya continues to display her sound of multi-tracked vocals with keyboards and elements of Celtic and new age music, though Enya does not consider her music to be in the latter genre. She sings in English, Irish, Latin, and Spanish.

The Memory of Trees received mostly positive reviews from music critics. It became a worldwide commercial success, reaching number five in the United Kingdom and number nine on the Billboard 200 in the United States. In 2000, it was certified multi-platinum by the Recording Industry Association of America for selling three million copies. Two tracks were released as singles: "Anywhere Is" in November 1995, which reached number seven in the United Kingdom, followed by "On My Way Home" in June 1996, which peaked at number 26. Enya supported the album with a promotional tour that included several interviews and televised performances. The Memory of Trees won Enya her second Grammy Award for Best New Age Album in 1997. It was remastered for a Japanese release with bonus tracks in 2009, and became available on vinyl in 2016.

== Recording and production ==
After travelling worldwide since late 1991 to promote her previous album Shepherd Moons (1991), and working for the soundtrack to the romantic adventure drama film Far and Away (1992), the 31-year-old Enya took a break from music that lasted for approximately one year. She spent most of the time with her family, trying "to unwind", and visiting different places around the world to provide further inspiration for her songwriting. She returned to work in 1993 when she felt it was the right time to start writing and recording a new studio album with her longtime recording partners, arranger and producer Nicky Ryan and his wife, lyricist Roma Ryan. Enya received further soundtrack offers during the recording of The Memory of Trees, but turned them down as she wished to concentrate solely on the album.

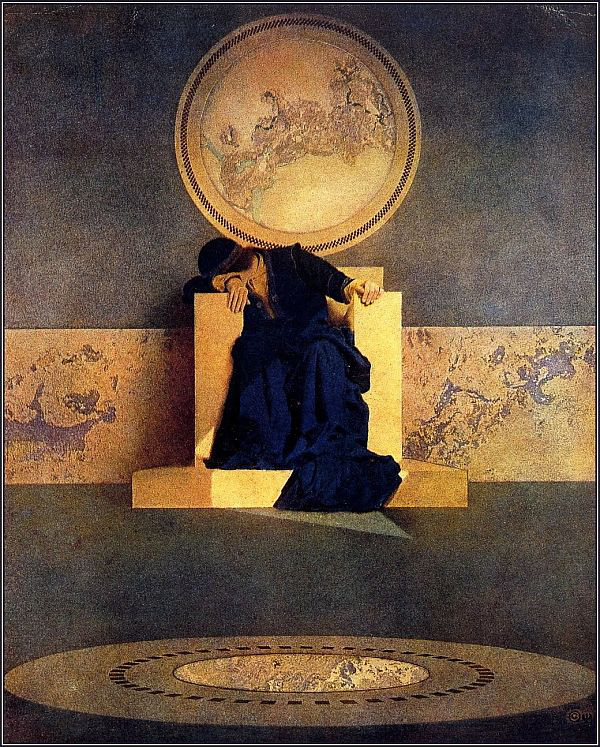
The album's cover is based on The Young King of the Black Isles (1906) by Maxfield Parrish.

During Enya's break from music, the Ryans moved home from Artane, a northern suburb of Dublin, to Killiney, County Dublin, which involved the relocation of Aigle Studio, their home recording facility where Enya had recorded her previous three albums, Enya (1987), Watermark (1988), and Shepherd Moons. Prior to the move, Enya and Nicky would start to record in Artane but were required to finish albums in London as Aigle lacked the right equipment to do so, which Enya found difficult as working in the city was met with frequent distractions and high studio rental costs, compared to the "very intimate and personal" setting at home. Aigle was rebuilt as a separate building on the grounds and upgraded with new equipment designed and built according to their specifications, thus making The Memory of Trees Enya's first to be recorded entirely in Ireland. She described the two-storey studio: "It's very peaceful and quiet. Upstairs we have this long room with two big arc windows at either end with a piano looking out over the Wicklow Mountains".

Enya's pace and hours of working in the studio increased during the last eight months of recording, waking up at seven or eight in the morning and working until late in order to "give as much as I could" on the album. Enya later said she "gave 100 per cent" on it. When recording finished the album was mastered by Arun Chakraverty, who had also worked on the 1992 reissue of Enya, The Celts. Nicky was pleased to have the album complete due to the length of time it took to record. He reasoned this down to the three being "the worst enemies in deciding when a piece is finished ... listener fatigue sets in and we're unable to judge whether the work's ready."

The album's sleeve design was arranged to a layout by Sooky Choi who, like Chakraverty, had worked on The Celts. Its front is an adaptation of The Young King of the Black Isles, a painting by American artist Maxfield Parrish from 1906, itself based on the story of the same name from the collection of folktales, One Thousand and One Nights. Enya is depicted as the crying young king sitting on his throne in a costume designed by English fashion designer Elizabeth Emanuel. Live action footage of Enya in the costume and pose is used in the music video to "Anywhere Is".

== Music and lyrics ==
Enya is the sole composer of the music on The Memory of Trees and co-arranged them with Nicky. It is her first album not to feature guest musicians. In addition to the vocals, piano and an array of keyboards and synthesisers that defined her sound, Enya plays the violin, cello, and percussion instruments. Her method of songwriting had deviated little since the start of her career, which started by entering the studio and forgetting about past successes. Ideas are then put on tape as either a vocal or a piano melody. "Usually what happens is the first note, the second note, and it takes me on a journey and I just go along with it." When a collection of ideas have been recorded Enya presents them to Nicky, starting discussions on how to develop them further into songs. Roma will then work on a lyric if she feels the song would suit one.

As with her previous two albums, The Memory of Trees opens with a same-titled instrumental with wordless vocals. The track originated from Roma after she read about Irish mythology and the Celtic druids, who placed a great importance on trees and believed they were sacred and possessed wisdom. Enya maintained it does not mean an ecological statement, but more about what trees may think about humans. Roma suggested its title and Enya agreed, thinking the title was particularly strong and has a sense of ambiguity that allows the listener to conjure up their own images and ideas when they see and hear it. When the title was agreed upon, Enya proceeded to write the song around two weeks later, which was an unusual way of working as the melody had always come first, followed by its title and lyrics.

"I feel I'm like their bridge to the real world. I deal in commerce. I'm out there in the world, I have an idea of how people will respond to the music. Whereas they're very isolated creatively."

— Warner Music UK chairman Rob Dickins, 1996.

"Anywhere Is" developed from a staccato line that Enya described had a "march feel". Initially it was a track that she and Nicky wanted to reject for the album, but it was developed further after Rob Dickins, then chairman of Warner Music UK who had signed Enya, was invited to Ireland in August 1995 to listen to the album, roughly a year and a half into the recording process. Enya and the Ryans thought the songs needed further work but Dickens expressed his satisfaction, "Most tracks sounded absolutely superb. They were ready." For "Anywhere Is", for which only its backing tracks had been put down, Dickins sensed the song had the makings of a hit single and encouraged them to complete it; it was the final track to be worked on. Enya's melody for the song inspired Roma to write lyrics about, as Billboard magazine put it, "the search for the temporal heaven all cultures call 'home'", a subject that Enya felt was important as she only writes and rehearses her songs in Ireland. Dickins received a dedication on the album's sleeve in Irish.

"Pax Deorum" is Latin for "Peace of the Gods" and features Enya playing the cello and violin, instruments that she had not fully learnt but can play basic chords that to her sounded effective when Nicky layered them in the studio with her synthesisers. While working on the track in its early stages during the Christmas 1994 period, the song took a direction that Enya and Nicky were not happy with, so they left it for up to three months before they revisited it, readjusting its basic theme in the process. When Enya played the song to Roma, it was clear to them that the song suited a language other than English, and decided Latin, at Roma's suggestion, for its "classic feel".

Regarding the Irish language song "Athair Ar Neamh", which translates as "Father in Heaven" in English, Roma wrote "The voice of epiphany is found in 'Athair ar Neamh'. It is the voice of day, the voice of night, the voice of all, of understanding ... a peace which is unique to the individual, a peace that is felt rather than described".

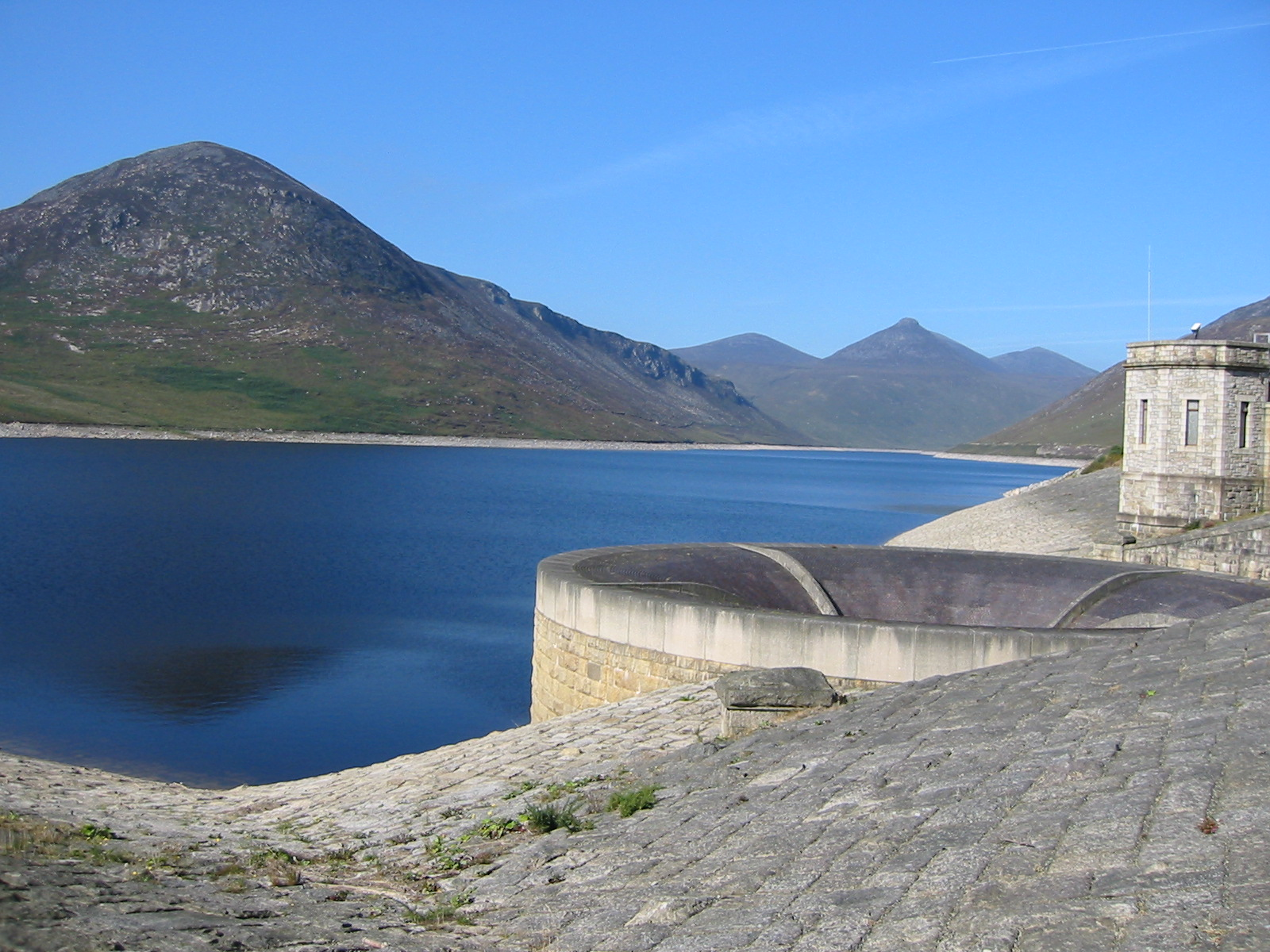
The vocals for "Hope Has a Place" were recorded on location at the Silent Valley Reservoir in the Mourne Mountains, Ireland

"From Where I Am" is the album's second of three instrumental tracks on the album. The title of "China Roses" makes reference to the flower Rosa chinensis. Its lyrics refer to the plants Christmas holly and Angel's tears, the red-tailed comet, the Keys of Heaven, and the One Thousand and One Nights stories. Roma explained the song is based on the idea that "everyone has their own idea of heaven ... it is a different treasure we embrace". "Hope Has a Place" was developed lyrically at first, after Roma had visited the Silent Valley Reservoir in the Mourne Mountains in Ireland, and wrote its words based around one's first love for her daughter Ebony. Enya subsequently wrote a melody and visited the Silent Valley with Nicky, who suggested that she record the song's lead vocal on location.

"Tea-House Moon" is the album's third instrumental track.

"Once You Had Gold" was influenced by Enya's experience of singing hymns in her youth, and incorporated its structure and melody into the track.

"La Soñadora" is Spanish for "The Dreamer". Its lyrics were inspired by a poem recited by Amergin Glúingel, a Druid of the Milesian race, upon his arrival to Ireland from Spain. Enya has an ancestral connection to Spain through her mother's side of the family; both aspects inspired her to sing it in Spanish, at Roma's suggestion.

To Enya, "On My Way Home" is about "those wonderful memories and fond moments that you have when you're on your way home", and wished to present a positive feel in the chorus. The song contains samples from two other Enya songs, "Book of Days" and "Orinoco Flow".

The original Japanese edition contains "Oriel Window", a piano instrumental that was recorded around the time of Shepherd Moons, as a bonus track.

== Release and commercial performance ==
To promote the album, Warner Music organised a pre-release event in London for journalists and broadcasters on the Silver Barracuda, a pleasure boat that travelled from Charing Cross to Greenwich, where a reception was held at Queen's House complete with a fireworks display. The following day, Enya held a private conference for the press. A limited edition promotional box set was released, of which 1,001 copies were produced, which included the album on CD and cassette with a 14-page booklet containing notes and a foreword autographed by Roma Ryan and printed lyrics.

The Memory of Trees was released on 20 November 1995 by WEA in the United Kingdom and on 5 December 1995 by Reprise Records in the United States. It reached number one on the Irish Albums Chart, in addition to topping the charts in Australia, Netherlands, Norway, Spain and Sweden. It also became Enya's fourth album to enter the top 10 of the UK Albums Chart, entering at number 6 before it reached its peak position of number 5 for two weeks in December 1995 during its initial 22-week run on the chart. The album re-entered the chart for a total of six weeks in 1996, and three more weeks in 1997. In the United States, The Memory of Trees peaked at number 9 on the Billboard 200, her highest-charting album in the country at the time of release, during a 66-week stay on the chart. On the Billboard New Age Albums chart, the album became Enya's second consecutive number one during a 104-week stay. To further promote the album, Enya and Nicky travelled worldwide on a media tour that covered sixteen countries and included interviews, guest appearances, and lip-sync performances of "Anywhere Is".

The album became an international commercial success. In December 1995, it was certified platinum by the British Phonographic Industry (BPI) for 300,000 copies sold in the United Kingdom. In August 1996, it reached double platinum for 600,000 copies sold. Its greatest success was in the United States where in February 1996, it was certified platinum by the Recording Industry Association of America (RIAA) for selling one million copies. In the following six months, a further one million copies were sold. In March 2000, The Memory of Trees was certified triple platinum for selling three million. In November 2008, Billboard reported the album had sold 2,397,724 copies in the United States according to figures tracked by Nielsen SoundScan.

Enya released a single from The Memory of Trees in 1995 and 1996. "Anywhere Is" was the lead single, released in November 1995. It became her second-highest-charting single in the United Kingdom, reaching a peak of number 7 during its 13-week stay on the chart. In 2013, it was certified silver by the BPI for 200,000 copies sold. A music video for the song was directed by David Scheinmann, who had previous worked with Enya on the reissue of Enya and her other promotional videos. "On My Way Home" was the second single, released in June 1996. It reached number 26 in the United Kingdom during a two-week stay on the singles chart. Its video was directed by Dickins.

In February 1997, The Memory of Trees earned Enya her second Grammy Award for Best New Age Album at the 39th edition of the award ceremony.

In 2009, the album was remastered for a Japanese release on Super High Material CD with three bonus tracks: "I May Not Awaken", originally released as the B-side to the "On My Way Home" single, and single edits of the latter and "Anywhere Is". On 11 November 2016, Reprise Records put the album out on vinyl for the first time.

== Critical reception ==
Professional ratings
Review scores
Source	Rating
AllMusic	3/5 stars
Cash Box	(favorable)
The Cincinnati Post	B+
Entertainment Weekly	B
The Guardian	3/5 stars
Los Angeles Daily News	2/5 stars
Los Angeles Times	3/4 stars
Music Week	5/5 stars
Q	4/5 stars
Rolling Stone	3/5 stars

Of frequent discussion was how little Enya's sound and style changed. Some critics welcomed Enya continuing the formula, Jody Callahan of The Cincinnati Post exclaiming The Memory of Trees was "another Enya record, with all the myth and warmth that implies", and The Los Angeles Times's Don Heckman writing the style would still appeal to Enya's fans. Rolling Stone reporter Elysa Gardner picked out "China Roses" as a track that reminded her of the "tranquil radiance" of "Caribbean Blue" from Shepherd Moons, with "Once You Had Gold" sounding "equally tender, with a reassuring lyric and all the prettiness of a Christmas carol". Others found the lack of evolution a downside and resulting in a dull experience. Sullivan felt it was not "quite as exotic or transcendent" as Enya's previous two albums, and wished for more "movement and drama". David Browne of Entertainment Weekly called Enya "even less the life of the pub" with her new release: "With its layered, breathing-lesson choral harmonies cushioned in sullen keyboards, the album is, except for a few perky moments, wistful to the point of stultification."

Nicky Ryans' production and Enya's singing was acclaimed. Howard Cohen for The Los Angeles Daily News state the record does not "disappoint, at least not stylistically" with its "flawless" recording and "gorgeous" sounds. The "technical proficiency and the mood-sustaining qualities" of the music, that Heckman called "mysterious" and "rich" coupled with Enya's "angelic, folk soprano" and "nostalgic" piano, flow to make a seamless album that "almost demands that the album be heard in its entirety". Callahan praised the record's "sonorous melodies, glowing with strings, piano and crashing percussion; luxurious vocals". Joyce praised her vocals and Nicky Ryan's production as forming a "cascading shower of harmonies". Jim Sullivan of The Boston Globe thought she and the Ryans produce "serene ambience" and "new-age music with subtlety and smarts".

== Track listing ==
All music by Enya, all lyrics by Roma Ryan, and all arrangements by Enya and Nicky Ryan.

No.	Title	Length
1.	"The Memory of Trees"	4:19
2.	"Anywhere Is"	3:58
3.	"Pax Deorum"	4:59
4.	"Athair Ar Neamh"	3:42
5.	"From Where I Am"	2:22
6.	"China Roses"	4:49
7.	"Hope Has a Place"	4:48
8.	"Tea-House Moon"	2:43
9.	"Once You Had Gold"	3:18
10.	"La Soñadora"	3:38
11.	"On My Way Home"	5:09
Total length:		43:50

1995 Japanese release bonus track
No.	Title	Length
12.	"Oriel Window"	2:22

2009 Japanese remaster bonus tracks
No.	Title	Length
12.	"Anywhere Is" (single edit)	3:48
13.	"On My Way Home" (remix)	3:38
14.	"I May Not Awaken"	4:23

== Personnel ==
Credits adapted from the album's liner notes.

Music

- Enya – Lead vocals, backing vocals, piano, keyboard, synthesizer, cello, violin, percussion

Production

- Nicky Ryan – producer, arrangements, recording engineer, audio mixing
- Rob Dickins – executive producer
- Arun Chakraverty – mastering (credited as "Arun")
- EMI Songs Ltd. – publisher
- Maxfield Parrish – sleeve photography (inspired by)
- Elizabeth Emanuel – costume design
- Sooky Choi – sleeve layout (credited as "Sooky")

== Charts ==
=== Weekly charts ===
Weekly chart performance for The Memory of Trees
Chart (1995–1996)	Peak position
Australian ARIA Albums Chart	1
Austrian Albums Chart	3
Belgian Ultratop 50 Albums (Flanders)	3
Belgian Ultratop 50 Albums (Wallonia)	6
Canada Top Albums/CDs (RPM)	4
Dutch Albums Chart	1
European Albums Chart	2
Finnish Albums Chart	11
German Albums Chart	4
Hungarian Albums (MAHASZ)	16
Irish Albums Chart	1
Italian FIMI Albums Chart	4
Japanese Hot Albums (Billboard Japan)	10
Japanese Albums Chart (Oricon)	15
New Zealand Albums Chart	3
Norwegian Albums Chart	1
Spanish Albums Chart	1
Swedish Albums Chart	1
Swiss Albums Chart	3
UK Albums Chart	5
US Billboard 200	9

=== Year-end charts ===
1995 year-end chart performance for The Memory of Trees
Chart (1995)	Position
Australian Albums Chart	17
Belgian Albums Chart (Flanders)	25
Dutch Albums Chart	60
Swedish Albums Chart	9
UK Albums Chart	20

1996 year-end chart performance for The Memory of Trees
Chart (1996)	Position
Australian Albums Chart	11
Austrian Albums Chart	22
Canadian Albums Chart	48
Dutch Albums Chart	32
European Albums Chart	9
German Albums Chart	23
New Zealand Albums Chart	50
Swedish Albums Chart	24
Swiss Albums Chart	28
UK Albums Chart	61
US Billboard 200	31
US Billboard New Age Albums Chart	2

1997 chart performance for The Memory of Trees
Chart (1997)	Position
US Billboard New Age Albums Chart	3

== Certifications and sales ==
Certifications and sales for The Memory of Trees
Region	Certification	Certified units/sales
Argentina (CAPIF)	Platinum	60,000^{^}
Australia (ARIA)	4× Platinum	280,000^{^}
Austria (IFPI Austria)	Platinum	50,000^{*}
Belgium (BRMA)	Platinum	50,000^{*}
Brazil (Pro-Música Brasil)	Platinum	250,000^{*}
Canada (Music Canada)	Platinum	100,000^{^}
Finland (Musiikkituottajat)	Gold	21,714
France (SNEP)	Gold	100,000^{*}
Germany (BVMI)	Gold	250,000^{^}
Italy	—	250,000
Japan (RIAJ)	3× Platinum	600,000^{^}
Mexico	—	20,000
Netherlands (NVPI)	Platinum	100,000^{^}
New Zealand (RMNZ)	Platinum	15,000^{^}
Poland (ZPAV)	Gold	50,000^{*}
Spain (Promusicae)	3× Platinum	300,000^{^}
Sweden (GLF)	Platinum	100,000^{^}
United Kingdom (BPI)	2× Platinum	600,000^{^}
United States (RIAA)	3× Platinum	3,000,000^{^}
Summaries
Europe (IFPI)	2× Platinum	2,000,000^{*}
^{*} Sales figures based on certification alone.^{^} Shipments figures based on certification alone.

== Release history ==
Release dates for The Memory of Trees
Country	Date	Format	Label
Various	20 November 1995	CD; cassette	WEA
United States	5 December 1995	CD; cassette	Reprise
Japan	March 2009	CD	Warner Music Japan
Various	11 November 2016	LP	WEA; Reprise; Maverick
