= How Can I Keep from Singing? =

American Christian hymn by 'Pauline T'

- by Pauline T & Robert Lowry
- Genre: Hymn
- Written: 1868
- Text: Pauline T
- Based on: Psalms 96
- Meter: 8.7.8.7 with refrain

"How Can I Keep from Singing?" is an American folksong originating as a Christian hymn. The author of the lyrics was known only as 'Pauline T', and the original tune was composed by American Baptist minister Robert Lowry. The song is frequently, though erroneously, cited as a traditional Quaker or Shaker hymn. The original composition has now entered into the public domain, and appears in several hymnals and song collections, both in its original form and with a revised text that omits most of the explicitly Christian content and adds a verse about solidarity in the face of oppression. Though it was not originally a Quaker hymn, Quakers adopted it as their own in the twentieth century and use it widely today.

== Authorship and lyrics ==
The first known publication of the words was on August 27, 1868, in The New York Observer. Titled "Always Rejoicing", and attributed to "Pauline T.", the text reads:

My life flows on in endless song;
Above earth's lamentation,
I catch the sweet†, tho' far-off hymn
That hails a new creation;
Thro' all the tumult and the strife
I hear the music ringing;
It finds an echo in my soul—
How can I keep from singing?

What tho' my joys and comforts die?
The Lord my Saviour liveth;
What tho' the darkness gather round?
Songs in the night he giveth.
No storm can shake my inmost calm
While to that refuge clinging;
Since Christ is Lord of heaven and earth,
How can I keep from singing?

I lift my eyes; the cloud grows thin;
I see the blue above it;
And day by day this pathway smooths,
Since first I learned to love it,
The peace of Christ makes fresh my heart,
A fountain ever springing;
All things are mine since I am his—
How can I keep from singing?

† The word "real" is also used here, perhaps following Pete Seeger.

These are the words as published by Robert Lowry in the 1869 song book, Bright Jewels for the Sunday School. Here Lowry claims credit for the music, an iambic 8.7.8.7.D tune, but gives no indication as to who wrote the words. These words were also published in a British periodical in 1869, The Christian Pioneer, but no author is indicated. Lewis Hartsough, citing Bright Jewels as source of the lyrics and crediting Lowry for the tune, included "How Can I Keep from Singing?" in the 1872 edition of the Revivalist. Ira D. Sankey published his own setting of the words in Gospel Hymns, No. 3 (1878), writing that the words were anonymous. In 1888, Henry S. Burrage listed this hymn as one of those for which Lowry had written the music, but not the lyrics.

Doris Plenn learned the original hymn from her grandmother, who reportedly believed that it dated from the early days of the Quaker movement. Plenn contributed the following verse around 1950, and it was taken up by Pete Seeger and other folk revivalists:

When tyrants tremble, sick with fear,
And hear their death-knell ringing,
When friends rejoice both far and near,
How can I keep from singing?
In prison cell and dungeon vile,
Our thoughts to them go winging;
When friends by shame are undefiled,
How can I keep from singing?

== History ==
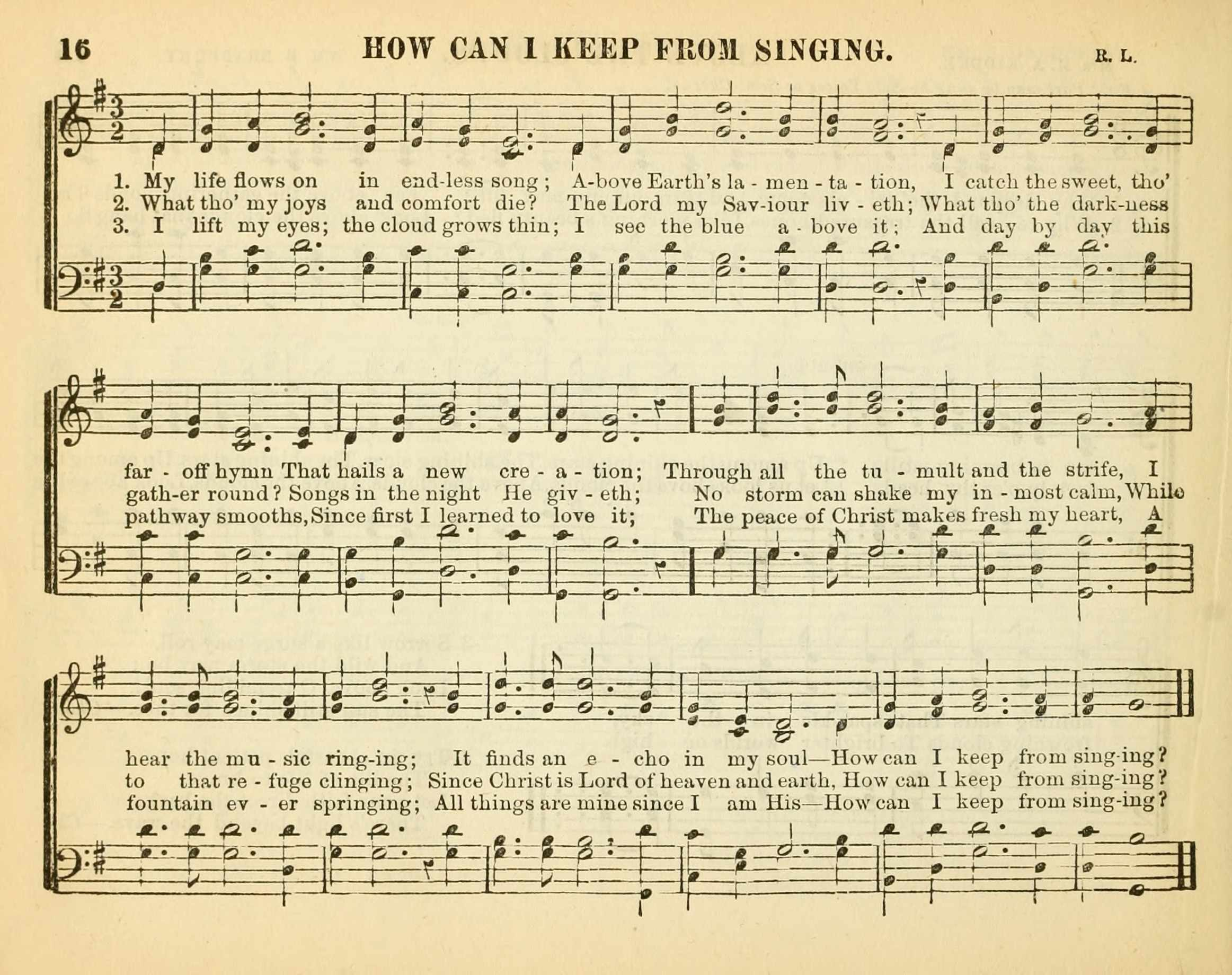
Version first published in Bradbury's Bright Jewels for the Sunday School (1869)

During the 20th century, this hymn was not widely used in congregational worship. Diehl's index to a large number of hymnals from 1900 to 1966 indicates that only one hymnal included it: the 1941 edition of The Church Hymnal of the Seventh-day Adventist Church, titled "My Life Flows On" (hymn no. 265). It was also published in the earlier 1908 Seventh-day Adventist hymnal, Christ in Song, under the title "How Can I Keep From Singing?" (hymn no. 331). The Evangelical Lutheran Church in America (ELCA) included it in the 1995 hymnal supplement With One Voice (no. 781). The United Methodist Church published it in its 2000 hymnal supplement, The Faith We Sing (hymn no. 2212), giving credit for the lyrics as well as the tune to Robert Lowry. The Faith We Sing version changes some of the lyrics and punctuation from the 1868 version. The Unitarian Universalist hymnal, printed in 1993 and following, credits the words as an "Early Quaker song" and the music as an "American gospel tune".

Pete Seeger learned a version of this song from Doris Plenn, a family friend, who had it from her North Carolina family. His version made this song fairly well known in the folk revival of the 1960s. Seeger's version omits or modifies much of the Christian wording of the original, and adds Plenn's verse above. The reference in the added verse intended by Seeger and by Plenn—both active in left-wing causes—is to 'witch hunts' of the House Un-American Activities Committee. (Seeger himself was sentenced to a year in jail in 1955 as a result of his testimony before the committee, which he did not serve due to a technicality.) Most folk singers have followed Seeger's version.

== Use by Quakers ==
The song has often been attributed to "early" Quakers, but Quakers did not permit congregational singing in worship until after the American Civil War (and many still do not have music regularly). But learning it in social activist circles of the fifties and hearing Seeger's (erroneous) attribution endeared the song to many contemporary Quakers, who have adopted it as a sort of anthem. It was published in the Quaker songbook Songs of the Spirit, and the original words, with Plenn's verse, were included in the much more ambitious Quaker hymnal project, Worship in Song: A Friends Hymnal in 1996.

== Enya version ==
"How Can I Keep from Singing?"

Single by Enya

from the album Shepherd Moons
- B-side: "'S Fágaim Mo Bhaile"; "Oíche Chiúin (Silent Night)"
- Released: November 25, 1991
- Genre: New-age
- Length: 4:14
- Label: WEA
- Songwriter(s): Robert Wadsworth Lowry; Enya; Roma Ryan
- Producer(s): Nicky Ryan

Enya singles chronology
| "Caribbean Blue" (1991) | "How Can I Keep from Singing?" (1991) | "Book of Days" (1992) |

Music video
- "How Can I Keep from Singing?" on YouTube

The song received new prominence in 1991 when Irish musician Enya released a recording of the hymn on her album Shepherd Moons. Enya's version follows Pete Seeger's replacement of some more overtly Christian lines, for example: "What tho' my joys and comforts die? The Lord my Saviour liveth" became "What tho' the tempest 'round me roars, I hear the truth it liveth." The song was released as a single in November of the same year, with "Oíche Chiúin" and "'S Fágaim Mo Bhaile" appearing as additional songs. It reached number 19 in Ireland and also charted in Australia, Belgium, Sweden and the United Kingdom.

=== Music video ===
The video clip features Enya singing in a church in the Gaoth Dobhair countryside while also including archive footage of political figures such as Nelson Mandela and Boris Yeltsin, among others, and references to the Gulf War and famine. The line about tyrants trembling shows Gennady Yanayev, leader of the 1991 August Coup, in a press conference with visibly trembling hands—apparently toward the end when the coup was unraveling.

=== Charts ===
| Chart (1991–1992) | Peak position |
|---|---|
| Australia (ARIA) | 47 |
| Belgium (Ultratop 50 Flanders) | 41 |
| Europe (Eurochart Hot 100) | 69 |
| Ireland (IRMA) | 19 |
| Sweden (Sverigetopplistan) | 29 |
| UK Singles (OCC) | 32 |

=== Release history ===
| Region | Date | Format(s) | Label(s) | Ref. |
|---|---|---|---|---|
| United Kingdom | November 25, 1991 | 7-inch vinyl; 12-inch vinyl; CD; cassette | WEA | |
| Australia | December 1991 | CD; cassette | WEA | |
| Japan | January 25, 1992 | Mini-CD | WEA | |
