= Shepherd Moons =

Studio album by Enya
- Released: 4 November 1991
- Recorded: 1988–1991
- Studios: Aigle, Artane, Dublin, Ireland; SARM West, London, England
- Genres: New-age; Celtic
- Length: 43:41
- Labels: WEA (UK); Reprise (US)
- Producer: Nicky Ryan

Enya chronology
Watermark (1988)	Shepherd Moons (1991)	The Memory of Trees (1995)

Singles from Shepherd Moons
- 1. "Caribbean Blue" Released: 7 October 1991; 2. "How Can I Keep from Singing?" Released: 25 November 1991; 3. "Book of Days" Released: 22 June 1992; 4. "Marble Halls" Released: 1994

Shepherd Moons is the third studio album by Irish singer and composer Enya, released on 4 November 1991 by WEA. After the unexpected critical and commercial success of her previous album Watermark (1988), Enya embarked on a worldwide promotional tour to support it. At its conclusion, she wrote and rehearsed new material for her next album with her long time recording partners, manager, arranger and producer Nicky Ryan and his wife, lyricist Roma Ryan. The album was recorded in Ireland and London and continued to display Enya's sound of multi-tracked vocals with keyboards and elements of Celtic and new-age music.

Shepherd Moons received generally positive reviews from critics and became a greater commercial success than Watermark. It went to number one on the UK Albums Chart and peaked at number seventeen on the Billboard 200 in the United States. The album was certified multi-platinum by the British Phonographic Industry and Recording Industry Association of America for shipments of 1.2 million and five million copies, respectively. Between 1991 and 1994, Enya released four singles from Shepherd Moons: "Caribbean Blue", "How Can I Keep from Singing?", "Book of Days", which charted at number ten in the United Kingdom, and "Marble Halls". As with Watermark, Enya supported the album with a worldwide promotional tour that included several interviews and televised performances. In 1993, the album won Enya a Grammy Award for Best New Age Album, the first of four she has won in her career. It was reissued in 1992 and 2009; the latter was a Japanese release with bonus tracks.

== Background and writing ==
In September 1988, Enya released her second studio album Watermark. It became an unexpected commercial success, charting around the world helped by its international top-ten hit, "Orinoco Flow". The album propelled Enya to worldwide fame and she spent much of the following year travelling worldwide to promote it through interviews, appearances, and performances. With such a length of time for promotion, Enya felt the priority was to return to the studio and record a new album rather than spend further time planning and completing a concert tour, partly due to the various difficulties involved in recreating her studio-oriented sound in a live setting. Enya worked with her long time recording partners, manager, producer and arranger Nicky Ryan and his wife, lyricist Roma Ryan. The success of Watermark complicated the writing process at first. Enya recalled: "I put a lot of pressure on myself at the beginning ... When I was composing new melodies I kept thinking "Would this have gone on Watermark? Is it as good?" Eventually I had to forget about this and start on a blank canvas and just really go with what felt right in the studio."

"A continuation of where I'd left off with Watermark. It was new melodies, new emotions."

— Enya describing the album, 1991.

When the process got underway, she was able to forget about the success of Watermark and start again. She added, "It felt like Watermark was a dream. It felt like it hadn't happened. And in a way it's nice because you can concentrate only on the music. You can forget about charts, how much you sold. You forget that." As with all her albums, Enya considered a strong melody as a fundamental part to her songwriting. Only when she has pieced one together, usually with vocal ideas or with piano accompaniment, does she then build a song around it. As with Watermark, Enya sings Irish, her first language, English, and Latin. Her Catholic upbringing and childhood experiences of hymns and church music, coupled with later studies in classical music, were big influences that helped form her albums. She gained inspiration from several sources and stories, including her personal diaries and her grandparents. Two tracks on Shepherd Moons are traditional songs that Enya rearranged with Nicky. Initially, Enya felt worried that by recording non-original songs, she would be unable to perform them with the same amount of emotion as she might with her own compositions, though her strong feelings towards them coupled with their age, made recording them easier.

== Recording ==
Shepherd Moons was recorded with new equipment purchased with the profits from Watermark. Much of the album was recorded at Aigle Studio, the recording studio in the Ryans' home, then located in Artane, a northern suburb of Dublin. However, as with her two previous albums, recording and production had to relocate elsewhere as the Aigle facility lacked the correct equipment to complete the final mix and mastering. The album was finished at SARM West Studios in London, where "How Can I Keep from Singing?", "Book of Days", and "Lothlórien" were recorded with additional engineering and mixing carried out by Gregg Jackman. As with Watermark, several musicians were brought in to perform additional instruments. Andy Duncan plays percussion on "Book of Days", Roy Jewitt plays the clarinet on "Evacuee" and "Angeles", Liam O'Flionn plays the uilleann pipes on "Smaointe...", Steve Sidwell plays the cornet on "Evacuee", and Nicky performs percussion on "Ebudæ".

Enya noticed a change in her own attitude when it came to recording Shepherd Moons, "the difference ... is that I've mellowed". This was down to the greater amount of time Enya took away from the studio, particularly during "quite difficult" moments, while recording the album in comparison to Watermark. The process, she felt, improved her sense of creativity in the long run. In some parts on the album, Enya recorded 500 layered voices without sampling or replication. When the melody to a song was completed, Roma Ryan would write lyrics to it. Several months after recording and mixing was complete, Enya had not yet listened to the album. "I will find any excuse not to. And honestly, I have never felt so miserable as finishing this album. It's fear – fear that all your feelings and all your emotions have gone into the thing, and when you hear it, it won't live up to your expectations for it."

Writer Molly Burke wrote about the album's artwork: "Shepherd Moons features Enya in what can only be described as an opera gown she could be twenty or forty but her delicate beauty is intact. There is a sense of timelessness here bathed in the dark but fragile blue of sorrow".

== Songs ==
=== Side one ===
As with Watermark, the album title opens with an instrumental title track with wordless vocals. Its title, devised by Roma, refers to two inner satellite moons around Saturn discovered in 1980, Pandora and Prometheus, that "protect and preserve the rings very much like a shepherd guiding his flock". Enya also liked the title as the association with the moon "is quite romantic".

"Caribbean Blue" is a waltz that depicts a journey through a fantasy world. It was named by Roma Ryan, as the melody that Enya had come up with reminded her of the Caribbean. In writing about the song in 2002, Roma wrote: "As with all dreams we reach for the ideal and "Caribbean Blue" represents such a dream. The lyrics can be summed up in three words, Believe in yourself."

Enya believed "How Can I Keep from Singing?" was a traditional Christian hymn from the Shaker sect. She chose to record her own rendition of it as she liked its melody and "very strong" lyrics. She added, "They talked about the trouble in the world, the strife, the turmoil, but at the end of each verse it simply said "how can I keep from singing?" ... I believe this in music ... at some stage you've got to try and forget the trouble that is around you". Enya and her record company were sued for copyright infringement by Sanga Music, Inc. for recording the song because she had mistakenly credited this track as a "traditional Shaker hymn", thus assumed it as public domain. Pete Seeger had helped make the song fairly well known in the 1950s by publishing it with Doris Plenn's additional third verse in his folk music magazine Sing Out! (Vol. 7, No 1. 1957), recording it, and mistakenly credited it as a "traditional Quaker hymn" without copyrighting Plenn's verse, thus presenting the entire song as "public domain". It was again published by Sanga Music, Inc. in 1964. Seeger had presented the new verse as being public domain and Plenn had only wanted the song to be preserved rather than seeking to make a profit from it, so the court decided that Enya could use the verse without paying royalties.

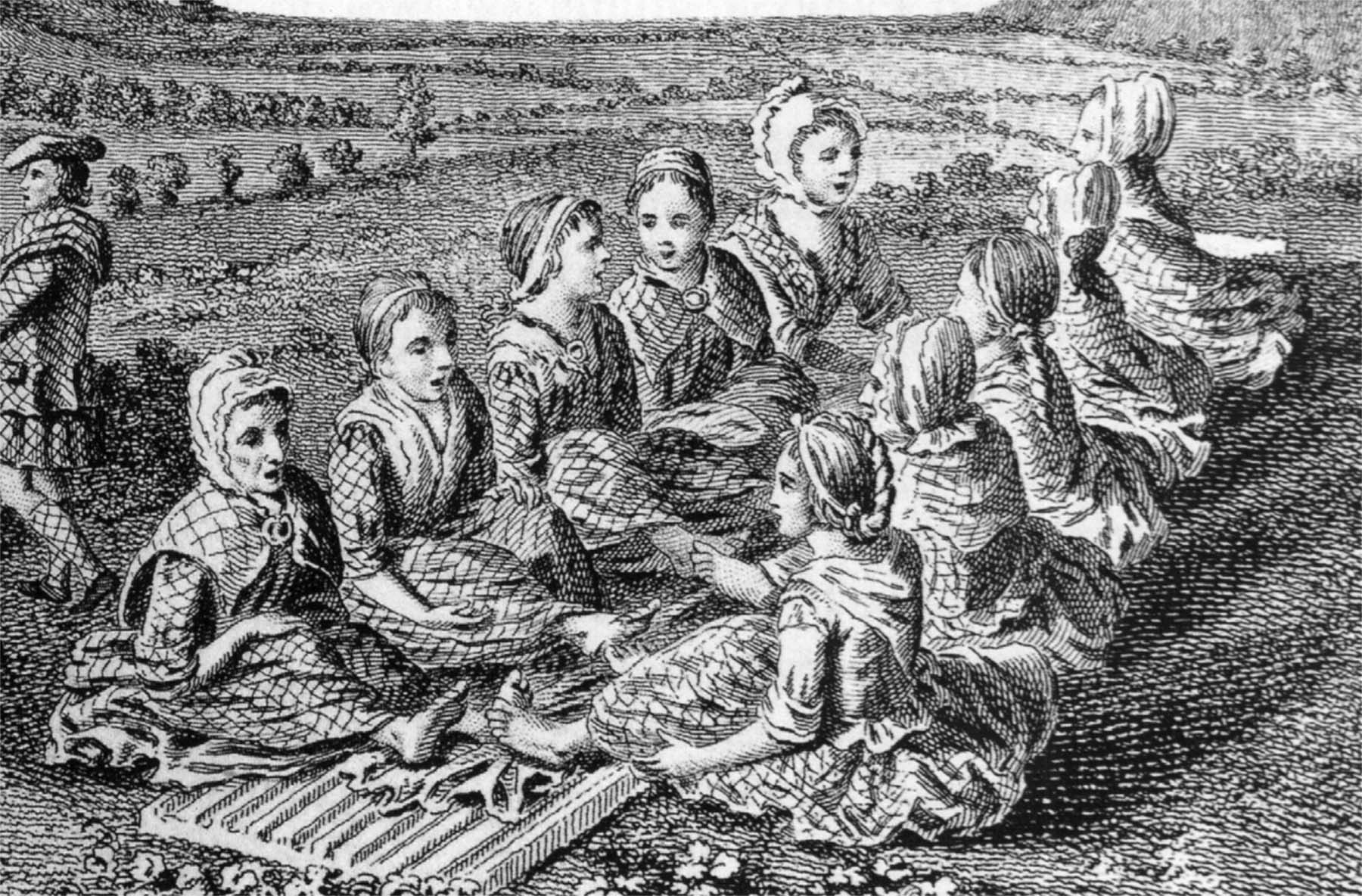
Scottish girls fulling cloth and singing waulking songs

"Ebudæ" is an ancient name of the Hebrides islands in western Scotland. The word was previously referenced in "Orinoco Flow", specifically in the lyric "From the north to the south, Ebudae into Khartoum". The song is composed of wordless mouth sounds that resemble Irish and Scottish Gaelic. Its story was inspired by the tradition of Scottish waulking songs sung by women as they fulled cloth.

"No Holly for Miss Quinn" is a piano instrumental named after a novel by Miss Read. It follows its partner piece, "Miss Clare Remembers" from Watermark, also named after one of her stories.

=== Side two ===
Enya drew inspiration for "Book of Days" from her own personal diary, something which Roma suggested as she knew Enya enjoyed keeping one. The song was adapted from its original form as an instrumental track for the soundtrack to the 1992 romantic film Far and Away, with Roma writing a set of lyrics based on the film's themes. The song features Irish lyrics that describe the excitement of writing in the diary in the morning, "because you don't really know what's going to happen ... it's the expectation of that day really that she was talking about". (Note: Later pressings of Shepherd Moons include a version of "Book of Days" with English lyrics that was originally recorded for the soundtrack to Far and Away (1992).)

"Evacuee" was written after she and Roma had seen a BBC documentary about a child evacuated from London during World War II and her subsequent reunion with her parents. A girl who was crying while recounting the story of her separation from, and return to, her home had moved them greatly. After Enya had written a melody for the song, the two imagined the scenario of the girl saying goodbye at the train station, "waiting until it's all over".

"Lothlórien" is an instrumental in reference to the Elvish kingdom mentioned in The Lord of the Rings novels and adaptations.

The album's second traditional song, "Marble Halls", is an aria from the 1843 opera The Bohemian Girl by Irish composer Michael William Balfe. Enya felt a sense of challenge when she recorded the latter as it had only been previously sung in an opera setting. For Nicky, it was necessary to incorporate reverb in the song as its title suggested to him that the listener should feel as if they are within a hall itself.

"Afer Ventus" is Latin for "African Wind". Roma was inspired to name the track by listening to its sound and structure with the melody lines constantly "sweeping in between each other", which created a wind-like effect.

"Smaointe...", roughly translated from Irish as "Thoughts...", was originally released as a B-side to the 7" single of "Orinoco Flow" as "Smaoitím... (D' Aodh Agus Do Mháire Uí Dhúgain)", released in 1988. The song refers to the story of a large tsunami destroying the church, and everyone inside, at Magheragallon Beach in Gweedore, where Enya's grandparents are buried. The theme of loss, something that Enya depicted in Watermark and Shepherd Moons, stemmed from her leaving home at age eleven to attend a strict boarding school, which she described as "devastating".

== Release ==
Shepherd Moons was released on 4 November 1991 in the United Kingdom; its release in the United States followed on 19 November 1991 by Reprise Records. A promotional box set containing a CD and cassette of the album, plus a 14-page booklet autographed by Roma with her words on each track and lyrics, was released and limited to 1,000 copies.

The album became a greater chart success than Watermark, reaching number one on the UK Albums Chart for one week for the week ending on 16 November 1991. It spent a total of 110 weeks on the chart. In the United States, it entered the Billboard 200 at number forty-seven, the week of 7 December 1991. It then rose to its peak at seventeen on the week ending 28 March 1992. It was present on the chart for a total of 238 weeks. On the Billboard New Age Albums chart, the album was number one for twenty-nine weeks during its 266-week stay.

In its first week of release, the album sold over 250,000 copies in the United States, and became Warner Bros. Records' top selling album in early 1992. This commercial success spread across Enya's catalogue; three months after Shepherd Moons, an additional 250,000 copies of Watermark were sold in the same country. By July 1994, seven million copies of Shepherd Moons had been sold worldwide. It sold close to one million copies in the United States each year from 1992 to 1996; in March 1996, it was certified quintuple platinum by the Recording Industry Association of America (RIAA) for shipment of five million copies. In January 1997, the album was certified quadruple platinum by the British Phonographic Industry (BPI) for shipment of 1.2 million copies. By 1994, the album spent 52 weeks on Spanish charts and sold nearly 400,000 copies in Spain. The album has sold an estimated 13 million copies worldwide.

Between 1991 and 1994, Enya released four singles from Shepherd Moons. "Caribbean Blue" was the lead single, released in November 1991. It peaked on the singles chart in the United Kingdom at thirteen, and received some crossover airplay exposure on alternative rock radio stations in the United States. "How Can I Keep from Singing?" was also released in 1991 and features two previously unreleased B-sides: "Oíche Chiúin (Silent Night)", the Irish language version of the Christmas carol "Silent Night" recorded in 1988, and "'S Fágaim Mo Bhaile", an original composition recorded in 1991. In July 1992, "Book of Days" was released as the third single and peaked at number ten in the United Kingdom. "Marble Halls" followed in 1994 following its inclusion in the 1993 film The Age of Innocence.

On 4 November 2021, the 30th anniversary of the release of Shepherd Moons, a live "watch party" video was broadcast on Enya's YouTube channel. The video featured the album played in its entirety, with poems by Roma Ryan and commentary on each track.

== Reception ==
Professional ratings
Review scores
Source	Rating
AllMusic	4.5/5 stars
Calgary Herald	B
Chicago Tribune	2.5/4 stars
Entertainment Weekly	B (1992); A− (1993)
NME	7/10
Q	3/5 stars
The Rolling Stone Album Guide	2.5/5 stars

Shepherd Moons received generally positive reviews from music critics. In his review for The Washington Post, reviewer Mike Joyce praised Enya's vocals as "impressive" and "crystalline" that bring "unmistakable poignancy to much of the album". However, the tracks that focus on her piano playing, like "No Holly for Miss Quinn" and "Shepherd Moons", make the album "succumb to the usual new age doldrums". Barbara Jaeger gave a positive review for The Record. The three-year gap between Watermark and Shepherd Moons, she wrote, was "worth it" as the album, like its predecessor, contains "rich sonic tapestries that envelop the listener" that brings a "lush, semi-New Age instrumental atmosphere" that is "only part of the inviting package". She picks "Angeles" and "Caribbean Blue" as highlight tracks along with her singing in Irish. In a retrospective review for AllMusic, Ned Raggett acknowledged similarities to Watermark, while also opining that "in terms of finding her own vision and sticking with it", Enya "polished and refined her work to a strong, elegant degree" on Shepherd Moons.

In 1993, Enya was awarded a Grammy Award for Best New Age Album for Shepherd Moons. She also won an IFPI Platinum European Award, a Billboard Music Award, and a National Association of Recording Merchandisers Award for Best Selling Album. Saxophonist Colin Stetson credited Shepherd Moons as an influence on his album All This I Do for Glory (2017). He said the Enya album "made me think about how the air is manipulated in my own music."

== Track listing ==
All music composed by Enya, except "How Can I Keep from Singing?" and "Marble Halls" trad. arranged by Enya and Nicky Ryan. All lyrics by Roma Ryan.

No.	Title	Length
1.	"Shepherd Moons"	3:44
2.	"Caribbean Blue"	3:59
3.	"How Can I Keep from Singing?"	4:14
4.	"Ebudæ"	1:56
5.	"Angeles"	4:01
6.	"No Holly for Miss Quinn"	2:43
7.	"Book of Days"	2:55
8.	"Evacuee"	3:50
9.	"Lothlórien"	2:07
10.	"Marble Halls"	3:54
11.	"Afer Ventus"	4:06
12.	"Smaointe..."	6:07
Total length:		43:41

2009 Japanese reissue bonus tracks
No.	Title	Length
13.	"Book of Days" (Gaelic version)	2:36
14.	"As Baile"	4:06
15.	"Oriel Window"	2:22

== Personnel ==
Credits are adapted from the 1991 CD liner notes.

Musicians

- Enya – vocals, instruments, percussion, arrangement
- Andy Duncan – percussion on "Book of Days"
- Roy Jewitt – clarinet on "Angeles"
- Liam O'Flionn – uilleann pipes on "Smaointe..."
- Nicky Ryan – percussion on "Ebudæ"
- Steve Sidwell – cornet on "Evacuee"

Production

- Nicky Ryan – producer, arranger, recording engineer (all other tracks), recording and mixing on "Ebudæ"
- Gregg Jackman – mixing engineer, recording engineer on "How Can I Keep from Singing?", "Book of Days" and "Lothlórien"
- Robin Barclay – assistant engineer
- David Scheinmann – photography
- The New Renaissance – wardrobe
- EMI Songs Ltd. – publisher
- Rob Dickins – executive producer

== Charts ==
=== Weekly charts ===
Weekly chart performance for Shepherd Moons
Chart (1991–97)	Peak position
Australian ARIA Album Chart	8
Austrian Albums Chart	31
Canada Top Albums/CDs (RPM)	7
Dutch Album Top 100 Chart	7
Finnish Albums Chart	28
German Media Control Albums Chart	21
Hungarian Mahasz Albums Chart	35
Japanese Oricon Albums Chart	23
New Zealand RIANZ Albums Chart	3
Norwegian VG-lista Albums Chart	2
Spanish AFYVE Albums Chart	3
Swedish Sverigetopplistan Albums Chart	5
Swiss Albums Top 100 Chart	13
UK Official Albums Chart	1
US Billboard 200	17
US Billboard New Age Albums Chart	1

=== Year-end charts ===
1991 year-end chart performance for Shepherd Moons
Chart (1991)	Position
Dutch Albums Chart	98
UK Albums Chart	20

1992 year-end chart performance for Shepherd Moons
Chart (1992)	Position
Australian Albums Chart	44
Canadian Albums Chart	29
Dutch Albums Chart	42
European Albums Chart	23
German Albums Chart	89
New Zealand Albums Chart	18
Spanish Albums (Promusicae)	5
UK Albums Chart	41
US Billboard 200	28
US Billboard New Age Albums Chart	1

1993 year-end chart performance for Shepherd Moons
Chart (1993)	Position
US Billboard 200	75
US Billboard New Age Albums Chart	1

1994 year-end chart performance for Shepherd Moons
Chart (1994)	Position
UK Albums Chart	99
US Billboard New Age Albums Chart	2

1995 year-end chart performance for Shepherd Moons
Chart (1995)	Position
US Billboard 200	189
US Billboard New Age Albums Chart	2

1996 year-end chart performance for Shepherd Moons
Chart (1996)	Position
US Billboard New Age Albums Chart	4

1997 year-end chart performance for Shepherd Moons
Chart (1997)	Position
US Billboard New Age Albums Chart	9
US Billboard New Age Catalog Albums Chart	2

== Certifications and sales ==
Certifications and sales for Shepherd Moons
Region	Certification	Certified units/sales
Argentina (CAPIF)	2× Platinum	120,000^{^}
Australia (ARIA)	3× Platinum	210,000^{^}
Belgium (BRMA)	2× Platinum	100,000^{*}
Brazil (Pro-Música Brasil)	Platinum	250,000^{*}
Canada (Music Canada)	3× Platinum	334,000
France (SNEP)	Gold	100,000^{*}
Germany (BVMI)	Gold	260,000
Ireland (IRMA)	Platinum	15,000^{^}
Japan (RIAJ)	Gold	199,000
Korea	—	207,000
Netherlands (NVPI)	2× Platinum	200,000^{^}
New Zealand (RMNZ)	Platinum	15,000^{^}
Spain (Promusicae)	5× Platinum	500,000^{^}
Switzerland (IFPI Switzerland)	Gold	25,000^{^}
Taiwan	—	156,000
United Kingdom (BPI)	4× Platinum	1,200,000^{^}
United States (RIAA)	5× Platinum	5,000,000^{^}
Summaries
Worldwide	—	13,000,000
^{*} Sales figures based on certification alone.^{^} Shipments figures based on certification alone.

== Release history ==
Release dates for Shepherd Moons
Country	Date	Format	Label
Europe	4 November 1991	CD; cassette	WEA
United States	19 November 1991	CD; cassette	Reprise
Japan	March 2009	CD	Warner Music Japan
Worldwide	2 December 2016	LP	Warner Music; Reprise

== Footnotes ==
Notes

Citations
