= On My Way Home (song) =

Single by Enya

from the album The Memory of Trees
- B-side: "Eclipse"; "I May Not Awaken"
- Released: 10 June 1996
- Genre: New-age; pop
- Length: 5:09 (album version); 3:38 (single version)
- Label: WEA
- Songwriters: Enya; Roma Ryan
- Producer: Nicky Ryan

Enya singles chronology
"Anywhere Is" (1995)	"On My Way Home" (1996)	"Only If..." (1997)

Music video
- "On My Way Home" on YouTube

"On My Way Home" is a song by Irish new-age artist Enya, released by WEA Records as the second and final single from her fourth studio album, The Memory Of Trees (1995). The song was written by Enya with Roma Ryan and produced by Nicky Ryan. According to Enya, the song is about "those wonderful memories and fond moments that you have when you're on your way home", and wished to present a positive feel in the chorus.

"On My Way Home" was first released in Japan on 10 June 1996, then was issued in the United Kingdom five months later, on 18 November. It achieved moderate success, reaching number 22 in Italy and number 26 on the UK Singles Chart in December 1996. In Brazil, it was a top-five hit, reaching number four.

== Critical reception ==
Larry Flick from Billboard magazine described the song as a "sweeping excursion into soothing new-age pop." He added, "Enya's dreamy, angelic voice is sewn into a quasi-classical arrangement of strings and acoustic guitars. Her performance ultimately grounds the song, as the music takes flight and winds through countless highs and lows. An excellent way to ring in the holiday season without resorting to 'Jingle Bells' too soon." In his review of The Memory Of Trees, Mike Joyce of The Washington Post felt "On My Way Home" "boasts a thoroughly engaging chorus and closes the album on a cheerful note."

== Track listing ==
UK cassette (1996)
No.	Title	Length
1.	"On My Way Home" (single remix)	3:37
2.	"Boadicea"	3:27

European/Australian CD single (1996)
No.	Title	Length
1.	"On My Way Home"	5:09
2.	"Eclipse"	1:34
3.	"I May Not Awaken"	4:26

Limited Edition Digi-Pack (wea 047cdx)
No.	Title	Length
1.	"On My Way Home" (single remix)	3:37
2.	"Morning Glory"	2:28
3.	"I May Not Awaken"	4:26
4.	"Eclipse"	1:34

Note: A version used in the music video runs for 4 minutes and 26 seconds. The cassette plays the same tracks on both sides.

== Charts ==
Chart (1996–1997)	Peak position
Australia (ARIA)	151
Brazil (UPI)	4
Italy (Musica e dischi)	22
UK Singles (OCC)	26

== Release history ==
Region	Date	Format(s)	Label(s)	Ref.
Japan	10 June 1996	CD	WEA	
United Kingdom	18 November 1996	CD; cassette	WEA	
Japan	25 May 1997	Maxi-CD	WEA	
