= Book of Days (song) =

1992 single by Enya

Single by Enya

from the album Shepherd Moons
- B-side: "As Baile"; "Morning Glory"
- Released: 22 June 1992
- Genre: New-age
- Length: 2:55
- Label: WEA
- Songwriters: Enya; Roma Ryan
- Producer: Nicky Ryan

Enya singles chronology
"How Can I Keep from Singing?" (1991)	"Book of Days" (1992)	"The Celts" (1992)

Music video
- "Book of Days" on YouTube

"Book of Days" is a song by Irish musician Enya. The original version, included on her 1991 album Shepherd Moons, is sung in Irish Gaelic. The subsequent 1992 single version is bilingual, with new English lyrics; this version was recorded for Ron Howard's film Far and Away, and scenes from the film feature in the video. The bilingual English-Irish version replaced the original pure Gaelic version on subsequent pressings of Shepherd Moons from mid-1992 onwards, making the original recording relatively rare.

"Book of Days" was released on 22 June 1992 in Australia and on 20 July in the United Kingdom by WEA Records. It became Enya's second top-10 single on the UK Singles Chart, peaking at number 10, and reached number 12 on the Irish Singles Chart. It was used as a temp track during the editing of James Cameron's film Titanic, for the scene eventually accompanied by the musical cue called "Take Her To Sea, Mr. Murdoch" on the finished soundtrack by James Horner.

== Critical reception ==
Ned Raggett from AllMusic stated that the singer's "trademark understated drama [are] in full flow" on the "wonderful" song. Gavin Report wrote, "This is a melodic and harmonic masterpiece with all the elements to make it a classic." Music & Media said, "Taken from the motion picture Far and Away, this is the sung version of the original ethereal Clannad instrumental." Music Week commented, that Enya's "latest sonic soundscape, Book Of Days, is typically mellifluous. Multi-textured yet as light as air".

== Track listings ==
UK 7-inch and cassette single
No.	Title	Length
1.	"Book of Days"	2:55
2.	"As Baile"	4:03

UK CD1
No.	Title	Length
1.	"Book of Days"	2:55
2.	"As Baile"	4:03
3.	"Morning Glory"	2:27

UK CD2
No.	Title	Length
1.	"Book of Days"	2:55
2.	"Watermark"	2:25
3.	"On Your Shore"	3:59
4.	"Exile"	4:23

Australian CD single
No.	Title	Length
1.	"Book of Days"	2:55
2.	"On Your Shore"	3:59
3.	"As Baile"	4:03

Japanese maxi-CD single
No.	Title	Length
1.	"Book of Days"	2:55
2.	"As Baile"	4:03
3.	"Angeles"	3:47
4.	"Oriel Window"	2:22
5.	"'S Fágaim Mo Bhaile"	3:57
6.	"Caribbean Blue"	3:40

== Charts ==
Weekly chart performance for "Book of Days"
Chart (1992)	Peak position
Australia (ARIA)	111
Europe (Eurochart Hot 100)	26
Ireland (IRMA)	12
Sweden (Sverigetopplistan)	34
UK Singles (Official Charts)	10
UK Airplay (Music Week)	10

== Release history ==
Release dates and formats for "Book of Days"
Region	Date	Format(s)	Label(s)	Ref.
Australia	22 June 1992	CD; cassette	WEA	
United Kingdom	20 July 1992	7-inch vinyl; CD; cassette	WEA	
Japan	25 August 1992	CD	WEA	

== In popular culture ==
The Gaelic version of "Book of Days" was used in the theatrical trailer of the Japanese film Calmi Cuori Appassionati (2001). The original Gaelic version was also used the same year on the original US trailer for the British film Billy Elliot.
