= Anywhere Is =

1995 single by Enya

Single by Enya

from the album The Memory of Trees
- B-side: "Boadicea"; "Oriel Window"
- Released: 6 November 1995
- Genre: New-age; pop
- Length: 3:58 (album); 3:47 (edit)
- Label: WEA
- Composer: Enya
- Lyricist: Roma Ryan
- Producer: Nicky Ryan

Enya singles chronology
"The Celts" (1994)	"Anywhere Is" (1995)	"On My Way Home" (1996)

Music video
- "Anywhere Is" on YouTube

"Anywhere Is" is a song by Irish singer Enya, released on 6 November 1995 by WEA as the lead single from her fourth studio album, The Memory of Trees (1995). The lyrics of the song are in English, written by Roma Ryan and it was produced by Nicky Ryan. The song peaked at number seven on the UK Singles Chart and became a top-10 hit in Austria, Iceland, and Ireland. On the Eurochart Hot 100, the song peaked at number 36. Its music video was directed by David Scheinmann.

== Background ==
"Anywhere Is" developed from a staccato line that Enya has described had a "march feel". Initially it was a track that she and producer Nicky Ryan wanted to reject for the album The Memory of Trees. But it was developed further after Rob Dickins, then chairman of Warner Music UK who had signed Enya, was invited to Ireland in August 1995 to listen to the album, roughly one year-and-a-half into the recording process. It was only its backing tracks that had been put down, but Dickins sensed the song had the makings of a hit single and encouraged them to complete it; it was the final track of the new album to be worked on. Enya's melody for the song inspired Roma Ryan to write lyrics about, as Billboard magazine put it, "the search for the temporal heaven all cultures call 'home'", a subject that Enya felt was important as she only writes and rehearses her songs in Ireland. Dickins received a dedication on the album's sleeve in Gaelic.

== Critical reception ==
AllMusic editor Rick Anderson constated that Enya has "a truly lovely voice", and added that there's no point trying to resist the "incantatory power" of "Anywhere Is". Larry Flick from Billboard magazine described the song as "an exhilarating uptempo pop waltz that will turn any car, den, or front stoop into an otherworldly tabernacle of sound." He complimented the singer for her "remarkable ability to inspire listeners is undiminished on this richly layered feast of melody-a throbbing secular hymn about life's search for fulfillment." A reviewer from Crawley News wrote that the song "sounds fabulous". James Masterton for Dotmusic felt that it's "if anything slightly more commercial than many of her previous hits, with a light, almost poppy sound." Dave Sholin from the Gavin Report found that "Enya has developed a truly distinctive style. Those of us who became fans early on love to convert the unitiated, and this song is bound to bring many more into the flock. Count on another magnificent video to accompany this very commercial track."

British magazine Music Week gave "Anywhere Is" a full score of five out of five and named it Single of the Week, adding, "Back with a vengeance, Enya's meanderings are given a jauntier air, with the familiar building chorus forming a strong hook." Michelle Boucher from The Observer complimented the song for having "a nice rhythm". Steven Johnson from The Record remarked its "spirited melody", that is the furthest away from her usual "tried-and-true" musical formula. Toledo Blade's reviewer described it as "positively upbeat". Mike Joyce from The Washington Post felt the song "highlight Enya's often overlooked pop sensibility", "with its wondrously spun harmonies, swiftly revolving melody and resonating backbeat".

== Chart performance ==
"Anywhere Is" entered the UK Singles Chart at number 12 on 12 November 1995 and peaked at number seven the next week. It was also a top-10 hit in Austria, Iceland, and Ireland and a top-20 hit the Netherlands. On the Eurochart Hot 100, "Anywhere Is" reached number 36 on 16 December. Outside Europe, the song peaked at number 11 in Israel, number 34 in Australia and number 62 in Canada. It received a silver certification in the United Kingdom, shipping over 200,000 units.

== Track listings ==
7-inch single and cassette, UK (1995)
No.	Title	Length
1.	"Anywhere Is"	3:44
2.	"Boadicea"	3:31

CD single, Europe (1995)
No.	Title	Length
1.	"Anywhere Is"	3:44
2.	"Boadicea"	3:31
3.	"Oriel Window"	2:22

CD maxi, Japan (1995)
No.	Title	Length
1.	"Anywhere Is"	3:44
2.	"Book Of Days"	2:55
3.	"Caribbean Blue"	3:40
4.	"Orinoco Flow"	3:45

== Charts ==
=== Weekly charts ===
Weekly chart performance for "Anywhere Is"
Chart (1995–1996)	Peak position
Australia (ARIA)	34
Austria (Ö3 Austria Top 40)	8
Belgium (Ultratop 50 Flanders)	50
Canada Top Singles (RPM)	62
Canada Adult Contemporary (RPM)	48
Europe (Eurochart Hot 100)	36
Europe (European Hit Radio)	11
Finland (Suomen virallinen lista)	14
Germany (GfK)	44
Iceland (Íslenski Listinn Topp 40)	3
Ireland (IRMA)	8
Israel (Israeli Singles Chart)	11
Italy Airplay (Music & Media)	8
Netherlands (Dutch Top 40)	26
Netherlands (Single Top 100)	19
Poland Airplay (Music & Media)	1
Scottish Singles Sales (Official Charts)	8
Sweden (Sverigetopplistan)	33
UK Singles (Official Charts)	7

=== Year-end charts ===
Year-end chart performance for "Anywhere Is"
Chart (1995)	Position
UK Singles (OCC)	55

== Certifications ==
Certifications and sales for "Anywhere Is"
Region	Certification	Certified units/sales
United Kingdom (BPI)	Silver	200,000^{^}
^{^} Shipments figures based on certification alone.

== Release history ==
Release dates and formats for "Anywhere Is"
Region	Date	Format(s)	Label(s)	Ref.
Australia	6 November 1995	CD; cassette	WEA	
United Kingdom	6 November 1995	CD; cassette	WEA	
Japan	10 December 1995	CD	WEA	
United States	12 December 1995	Contemporary hit radio	Reprise	
Japan (re-release)	25 May 1997	CD	WEA	
