= Far and Away =

1992 film

- Theatrical release poster
- Directed by: Ron Howard
- Screenplay by: Bob Dolman
- Story by: Ron Howard; Bob Dolman
- Produced by: Ron Howard; Brian Grazer; Bob Dolman
- Starring: Tom Cruise; Nicole Kidman; Thomas Gibson; Robert Prosky; Cyril Cusack
- Cinematography: Mikael Salomon
- Edited by: Daniel P. Hanley; Mike Hill
- Music by: John Williams
- Production company: Imagine Entertainment
- Distributed by: Universal Pictures
- Release date: May 22, 1992
- Running time: 140 minutes 170 minutes (Extended cut)
- Country: United States
- Language: English
- Budget: $60 million
- Box office: $137.8 million

Far and Away is a 1992 American epic Western romantic adventure drama film directed by Ron Howard from a screenplay by Bob Dolman and a story by Howard and Dolman. It stars Tom Cruise and Nicole Kidman. This was the last cinematography credit for Mikael Salomon before he moved on to a directing career. The music score was by John Williams. It was screened out of competition at the 1992 Cannes Film Festival.

Cruise and Kidman, who were married at the time, play Joseph Donnelly and Shannon Christie, Irish immigrants seeking their fortune in the 1890s America, eventually taking part in the Land Run of 1893. This was Cyril Cusack's final film before his death the following year.

Far and Away was released by Universal Pictures on May 22, 1992. The film received mixed reviews from critics and grossed $137.8 million against a $60 million budget.

== Plot ==
In 1892 Ireland, impoverished tenant farmer Joseph Donnelly dreams of one day owning his own land. After his father Joseph Sr. dies, their family home is burned by their landlord Daniel Christie's men, due to unpaid rent. Joseph goes to Christie's home to kill him in revenge but his daughter Shannon stabs his leg with a pitchfork.

Daniel's wife Nora and Shannon nurse Joseph back to health so he can be hanged for the attempted murder. The headstrong Shannon, who resists being molded into a refined lady, dreams of going to America where land is being given away for free. When Joseph tries to flee the Christie home, Stephen Chase, the Christies' brutal estate manager, intercepts him.

Stephen challenges Joseph to a duel for the next morning. That morning, Daniel tells Joseph that he knew nothing about the tenant evictions or unfair rents. As the duel is about to commence, Shannon arrives in a horse-drawn cart. Needing a servant and protector, she convinces Joseph to run away with her to America.

While sailing to America, Shannon and Joseph meet McGuire, who confirms Shannon's story about the Oklahoma land giveaway. He explains that Oklahoma is a thousand miles inland and the desired land is claimed in a race. Shannon reveals she has a collection of silver spoons that will pay their way to Oklahoma.

Upon arriving in Boston, McGuire steals the spoons but is shot dead in the street, leaving the silverware lost in the chaos. An Irish boy introduces the couple to Mike Kelly, a ruthless Irish ward boss who arranges jobs and lodging. Joseph soon earns their living by fighting in bare-knuckle boxing matches at Kelly's club. Over the following weeks, Joseph and Shannon struggle to adapt to their new lives. Romantic tension flares between them, especially after Grace, a dancer at Kelly's club, flirts with Joseph, inciting Shannon's jealousy.

One night, Joseph discovers Shannon is dancing in Kelly's burlesque show for extra money. When he storms in to take her home, Kelly and the other Irishmen there beg him to fight an Italian contender, promising to split the two-hundred-dollar purse. It will be enough money to go to Oklahoma.

Joseph is winning until he notices one of his backers groping Shannon. Distracted, Joseph is defeated by a sucker punch. As payback for the loss, Kelly and his men take all of the couple's money and toss both Shannon and Joseph out into the winter streets.

Cold and starving, the pair break into a seemingly abandoned house. They share a romantic moment before the owners return, chasing them off and shooting Shannon in the back as they escape. Joseph, knowing the Christies are in Boston looking for Shannon, takes her to them. After leaving Shannon in their care, he heads west to the Ozarks Mountains and finds work laying train track.

Months later, while en route to the next work site, Joseph notices a wagon train headed for Oklahoma and joins them. He arrives in Oklahoma just in time for the Land Run of 1893 and finds that Shannon, Stephen and the Christies are also there. Stephen, after seeing Joseph talking to Shannon, threatens to kill him if he goes near her again. Joseph, riding a half-broke horse, outpaces everyone during the race. He catches up to Shannon and Stephen, who prematurely sneaked across the starting line.

Before Joseph can plant his claim flag, a fight breaks out between him and Stephen, ending with Joseph being crushed by Stephen's horse. Shannon rushes to him, rejecting Stephen. Joseph professes his love for her and collapses, seemingly dead, but revives when she reciprocates his feelings. They drive his flag into the ground and claim their land together.

== Cast ==
- Tom Cruise as Joseph Donnelly
- Nicole Kidman as Shannon Christie
- Thomas Gibson as Stephen Chase
- Robert Prosky as Daniel Christie
- Barbara Babcock as Nora Christie
- Cyril Cusack as Danty Duff
- Colm Meaney as Mike Kelly
- Eileen Pollock as Molly Kay
- Michelle Johnson as Grace
- Douglas Gillison as Dermody
- Wayne Grace as D'Arcy Bourke
- Barry McGovern as McGuire
- Niall Tóibín as Joseph Donnelly Sr.
- Rance Howard as Tomlin
- Clint Howard as Flynn
- Jared Harris as Paddy
- Steven O'Donnell as Colm
- Peadar Lamb as Farmer
- J. G. Devlin as Villager
- Derry Power as Peter
- Noel O'Donovan as Matthew
- Macdara Ó Fátharta as John
- Eileen Colgan as Lady
- Todd Hallowell as Thug
- Rynagh O'Grady as Olive
- Brendan Gleeson as Policeman
- Hoke Howell as Boss
- Rocco Sisto as Immigrant
- Pauline McLynn as Prostitute
- Aedin Moloney as Prostitute
- James Jude Courtney as Boxer
- Anthony De Longis as Boxer
- Carl Ciarfalio as Italian Boxer
- Bob Dolman as Honest Bob

== Production ==
Ron Howard's grandfather, who participated in the Land Run of 1893, 99-years prior to the film's release, was the inspiration for inclusion of the plotline in the movie. The film was shot in Montana for business reasons, but the Oklahoma Historical Society was involved in its production. Imagine Production Co. toured the areas around Montana for a week. They visited different areas before selecting Billings, Montana. Howard, whose film Backdraft was in the stages of being released in theatres at the time, arrived in Billings to begin the groundwork for the film. One site outside of town was a 12,000-acre (49 km^{2}) ranch, which was going to be used to film the Oklahoma Land Rush scene. Working titles for the film included The Irish Story and An Irish Story.

Principal photography began in Montana on May 28, 1991. After several weeks of preparation, the cast and crew filmed the Oklahoma Land Rush scene on July 7, 1991. Eight hundred riders and extras, nine hundred horses, mule, oxen and two hundred wagons were used on a quarter-mile wide set. Nine cameras were used to film the action sequences. During the filming of the scene, four people broke bones and one horse died. Joseph Donnelly (Tom Cruise)'s boxing match was filmed at the Billings Depot. Local area residents were used as extras for the sequence. American Humane Society reported that "The production company not only met American Humane's Guidelines, but went that extra mile to ensure both the physical and mental wellness of the animals." After filming wrapped in Billings, the cast and crew traveled to Dublin, Ireland, to complete filming. Ardmore Studios in Wicklow was used to film interior sequences, and the streets of Boston were filmed in Dublin.

It was the first film shot in Panavision Super 70 and the first film to be shot in 70 mm in a decade since Tron (1982). The Arriflex 765 camera was also used, as the camera was capable of 100 frames per second which was used for slow-motion shots during the Oklahoma land rush scene.

== Soundtrack ==
Far and Away

Film score by John Williams
- Released: 26 May 1992
- Recorded: 1992
- Genre: Soundtrack
- Length: 67:12

Professional ratings
Review scores
Source	Rating
Filmtracks	5/5 stars

The music to Far and Away was composed and conducted by John Williams. The score, a mixture of traditional Irish instrumentation and conventional orchestra, prominently featured performances by the Irish musical group The Chieftains and a revision of the song "Book of Days" composed and performed by Enya. The soundtrack was released on 26 May 1992 through MCA Records and features 19 tracks of music at a running time of just over 67 minutes. Selections from the soundtrack have been featured in the trailers for various films including Rudy (1993), Getting Even with Dad (1994), Circle of Friends (1995), Treasure Planet (2002) and Charlotte's Web (2006).

1. "County Galway, June 1892" (1:55)
2. "The Fighting Donnellys" (2:18) – featured performance by The Chieftains
3. "Joe Sr.'s Passing/The Duel Scene" (4:41)
4. "Leaving Home" (1:55)
5. "Burning the Manor House" (2:43)
6. "Blowing Off Steam" (1:31)
7. "Fighting for Dough" (2:02) – featured performance by The Chieftains
8. "Am I Beautiful?" (3:38)
9. "The Big Match" (5:56)
10. "Inside the Mansion" (4:24)
11. "Shannon is Shot" (4:06)
12. "Joseph's Dream" (3:08)
13. "The Reunion" (3:50)
14. "Oklahoma Territory" (2:12)
15. "The Land Race" (4:56)
16. "Settling with Steven/The Race to the River" (4:08)
17. "Joseph and Shannon" (3:14)
18. "Book of Days" (2:53) – composed and performed by Enya
19. "End Credits" (6:35) – featured performance by The Chieftains

La-La Land Records released a remastered 2-CD set in March 2020 as a limited edition of 3500. This release includes alternate cues as well as previously unreleased score components.

1. "County Galway, June 1892" 2:01
2. "The Fighting Donnellys"+ 2:22
3. "Joe Sr.'s Passing"** 2:22
4. "The Village Burns"* 1:56
5. "Leaving Home" 2:02
6. "The Barn/Running Away"* 4:32
7. "The Duel Scene"+ 3:02
8. "This is My Destiny"* 1:12
9. "Burning the Manor House" 2:50
10. "Am I Beautiful?" 3:43
11. "Blowing Off Steam" 1:36
12. "Fighting for Dough"+ 2:07
13. "My Own Man"* 1:15
14. "Into the Bath"* 1:37
15. "The Big Match" 6:02
16. "Banished"* 3:40
17. "Inside the Mansion" 4:30
18. "Shannon is Shot" 4:13
19. "Day Dreaming" 1:13
20. "Joseph's Dream" 3:13
21. "The Horseshoe"* :35
22. "The Reunion (Film Version)" 2:57

Score Presentation (cont'd)

1. "Oklahoma Territory" 2:17
2. "The Land Race" 5:03
3. "Race to the River" 1:51
4. "Settling with Stephen"** 3:09
5. "Joseph and Shannon" 3:22
6. "End Credits"+ 6:43

Total Score Presentation: 1:21:53
Additional music 28:28

1. "Joe Sr.'s Passing (Alternate)"** 1:37
2. "The Barn (Alternate)"* 2:41
3. "My Own Man (Alternate)"* 1:14
4. "The Big Match (Alternate)"** 5:24
5. "Oklahoma Territory (Film Version)"** 2:17
6. "The Land Race (Alternate)"** 5:01
7. "Joseph and Shannon (Alternate)"** 3:21
8. "End Credits (Alternate)"**+ 6:47

Total (2-disc) Time: 1:50:30

== Release ==
Far and Away was released on May 22, 1992, in 1,583 theaters, 163 of which were in 70 mm.

=== Home media ===
The film was originally released on VHS and LaserDisc with it then released in the United States on DVD in May 1998 by Universal Pictures Home Entertainment with subtitles in English, Spanish, and French. It was first released as a Blu-ray disc and HD download package on March 4, 2014, with one extra feature, a theatrical trailer.

=== Extended TV cut ===
For its airing on ABC in March 1995, the network reinstated 35 minutes of deleted scenes to fill two two-hour blocks over two nights. The 170 minute version has never been officially released on home media.

== Reception ==
=== Box office ===
The film, which cost $60 million to make, earned $13 million in its first weekend at the box office and stumbled at the box office, making only $58 million in the United States and Canada. It was the third highest-grossing film in Ireland with a gross of £0.8 million. It grossed $79 million internationally for a worldwide total of $137 million.

=== Critical response ===
On Rotten Tomatoes the film has an approval rating of 51% based on reviews from 39 critics. The site's critics' consensus reads: "Handsome and simplistic, Far and Away has the beauty of an American epic without the breadth." On Metacritic it has a weighted average score of 49 out of 100 based on reviews from 19 critics, indicating "mixed or average" reviews. Audiences surveyed by CinemaScore gave the film a grade "A" on a scale of A to F.

Roger Ebert praised the film's cinematography while criticizing its script:

Far and Away is a movie that joins astonishing visual splendor with a story so simple-minded it seems intended for adolescents... It's depressing that such a lavish and expensive production, starring an important actor like Tom Cruise, could be devoted to such a shallow story.

Todd McCarthy of Variety called it "handsomely mounted and amiably performed but leisurely and without much dramatic urgency." Hal Hinson of The Washington Post wrote: "Far and Away... is the director's attempt to step into the cinematic shoes of directors John Ford and David Lean. And, certainly, he's stepped into something with this sprawling, old-fashioned melodrama."

Writer Tony Parsons called it "a stinker of a picture...which was far and away the worst film I have ever seen." The film was nominated for a Golden Raspberry Award for Worst Original Song for the song "Book of Days" by Enya and Roma Ryan at the 13th Golden Raspberry Awards.
