= Irish Recorded Music Association =

Irish music organization

- Type: Non-profit
- Location: Ireland
- Services: Media attention, direct-appeal campaigns, research
- Fields: Protecting music rights
- Key people: Sean Murtagh (Anti-Piracy Dept), Alex Callow (IRMA Membership), Willie Kavanagh (Chairman IRMA), Pat Creed (Warner Music Ireland), Mark Crossingham (Universal Music Ireland), Annette Donnelly (Sony Music Ireland) & Peter Kenny (RMG)
- Website: irma.ie

The Irish Recorded Music Association (IRMA) is a non-profit association set up in 1999 to promote certain interests of the music industry in Ireland. It is particularly active in addressing copyright issues, and it compiles the official music charts for Ireland.

== Membership ==
Only Irish companies can become members of the IRMA. All members pay a yearly fee based on company size. Currently, the IRMA has 51 member companies.

=== Board member companies ===
The recording companies and other music-related companies that are on the IRMA board are:

- Warner Music Ireland
- Universal Music Ireland
- Sony Music Ireland (formerly Sony BMG Ireland)
- IML Irish Music Licensing Ltd
- Faction Records
- Rubyworks

== Goals and activities ==
IRMA operates to promote and protect the welfare and interests of the Irish record industry. Specifically, IRMA is involved in lobbying to protect and enhance the interest of member companies and lobby to prevent illegal downloading of music content from local and international artists.

IRMA also compiles and manages Ireland's official music charts. These include: Top 100 Albums, Top 100 Singles, Top 10 Classical Albums, Top 10 Dance Singles, Top 20 Multi-Artist Compilation Albums, Top 30 Videos, Top 20 DVDs and Top 10 Music DVDS.

IRMA previously ran an Irish Downloads Chart that was incorporated into the singles chart in 2006. Streaming data was added to the singles chart in 2014.

In the mid-1990s IRMA presented the IRMA Music Awards. These have been replaced by the annual music awards show Meteor Ireland Music Awards.

In the past IRMA has organised "The IRMA Honours," an awards ceremony which honours the life work of Ireland's leading musicians and people who have influenced the Irish music industry. Past recipients include Bob Geldof, Larry Gogan and Christy Moore.

=== Copyright issues ===
On 12 April 2005, the association began to take legal action against "serial filesharers" in Ireland who illegally distribute music on the Internet. On 15 November 2005, the IRMA began "Phase II" of its plan to battle filesharing.

On 12 June 2013, IRMA secured an Order of the High Court to block access to The Pirate Bay to all internet users in Ireland.

=== Filesharing controversy ===
IRMA and Eircom reached an agreement over file sharing which uses a third-party organisation to monitor Eircom users for downloading of infringing music. The agreed system was reported to use a "three-strikes-and-you're-out" system. The agreement was criticised by Digital Rights Ireland and IrelandOffline.

The association sent solicitors' letters to several organisations, including hosting service Blacknight Solutions, whose MD, Michele Neylon, made the copy sent to his company publicly available on the company site. Although Blacknight Solutions is not an ISP they still received the letter, which stated in the event of a positive response to this letter it is proposed to make practical arrangements with Blacknight of a like nature to those made with Eircom.

Protests against some actions of IRMA are being organised by Digital Rights Ireland, as well as Blackout Ireland.

== The IRMA trust ==
In 1997 the IRMA set up a trust with Phonographic Performance Ireland, with the aim to enhance the opportunities for young people who want to pursue a career in music. The trust's main initiative is the Instrument Bank, which provides music instruments to young people, particularly to young people who live in disadvantaged communities throughout Ireland.

== Awards ==
Since July 2021, IRMA has awarded the number one selling album and single of the week with a specially commissioned award designed by NCAD design students Katie O'Brien and Kate McKenna. The trophy design – the number one and a musical note entwined – was made using brushed aluminium and black recycled acrylic.

This award is different from the awards show presented by IRMA in the 1990s. The IRMA Music Awards were discontinued in the late 1990s replaced with the Meteor Ireland Music Awards and later the Choice Music Prize.

== See also ==
- Music industry
- List of albums certified by the Irish Recorded Music Association
- List of artists who reached number one in Ireland
- List of one-hit wonders in Ireland
- List of songs that reached number one on the Irish Singles Chart
- List of Irish Singles Chart Christmas number ones
- Irish Singles Chart
- Irish Albums Chart
