= Caribbean Blue =

1991 single by Enya

Single by Enya

from the album Shepherd Moons
- B-side: "Orinoco Flow"; "As Baile"; "Oriel Window"
- Released: 7 October 1991
- Length: 3:58 (album version); 3:39 (single version)
- Label: WEA
- Songwriters: Enya; Roma Ryan
- Producer: Nicky Ryan

Enya singles chronology
"Exile" (1991)	"Caribbean Blue" (1991)	"How Can I Keep from Singing?" (1991)

Music video
- "Caribbean Blue" on YouTube

"Caribbean Blue" is a song by Irish musician Enya, included as the second track on her third studio album, Shepherd Moons (1991). It was written by Enya and Roma Ryan, and produced by Nicky Ryan. The song follows a waltz time signature, and mentions the Anemoi (Ancient Greek wind gods): Boreas, Afer Ventus (Africus), Eurus, and Zephyrus.

"Caribbean Blue" was released as the lead single from the album on 7 October 1991 by WEA. It reached number eight on the Irish Singles Chart and number 13 on the UK Singles Chart. In the United States, it reached number 79 on the Billboard Hot 100 and number three on the Billboard Modern Rock Tracks chart. The accompanying music video, directed by Michael Geoghegan, features visual imagery based on the paintings of Maxfield Parrish and was an early appearance for British actress and singer Martine McCutcheon.

== Composition ==
The song is written in the key of E major with a fast tempo of 158 beats per minute in 3/4 (waltz) time. Halfway through the song, the key shifts up one semitone to F major. Enya’s vocals span from B_{3} to G_{4}.

== Critical reception ==
Ned Raggett from AllMusic noted that on the song, the singer 'avoids repeating the successful formula of "Orinoco Flow" by means of its waltz time—a subtle enough change, but one that colors and drives the overall composition and performance, the closest Enya might ever get to a dance number.'

Larry Flick from Billboard magazine described it as 'dreamy and evocative' and 'multilayered and intricate'. He noted further that 'rich tapestry of sound lulls the listener with the promise of complex musical textures. Enya's understated vocals swell into effective wavelike crescendos that ebb and flow with the picturesque melody.'

David Browne from Entertainment Weekly called it 'a breathy, upbeat waltz that personifies everything Enya'. Pan-European magazine Music & Media wrote that 'it is as dreamy as her 1988 global hit "Orinoco Flow", but more dressed with instruments'. People Magazine stated that 'the Irish singer's angelic vocals lift this elegant and avant-garde waltz heavenward'.

== Music video ==
The music video for "Caribbean Blue" was directed by Michael Geoghegan and inspired by the illustrations of the American painter Maxfield Parrish. The pastel-like effect was added by painting on a transparent foil posed over video frames. A documentary about making of the video is included on The Video Collection and The Very Best of Enya DVDs.

== Track listings ==
- UK 7-inch and cassette single
- US and Australian cassette single
- Japanese mini-CD single
1. "Caribbean Blue"
2. "Orinoco Flow"
- UK CD single
1. "Caribbean Blue"
2. "Orinoco Flow"
3. "As Baile"
4. "Oriel Window"
- European 12-inch single

A1. "Caribbean Blue" – 3:39
A2. "Orinoco Flow" – 3:44
B1. "Angeles" – 3:58

== Charts ==
=== Weekly charts ===
1991–1992 weekly chart performance for "Caribbean Blue"
Chart (1991–1992)	Peak position
Australia (ARIA)	74
Belgium (Ultratop 50 Flanders)	30
Canada Top Singles (RPM)	32
Canada Adult Contemporary (RPM)	10
Europe (Eurochart Hot 100)	31
Europe (European Hit Radio)	21
Germany (GfK)	50
Ireland (IRMA)	8
Luxembourg (Radio Luxembourg)	8
Netherlands (Dutch Top 40)	21
Netherlands (Single Top 100)	37
New Zealand (Recorded Music NZ)	22
Sweden (Sverigetopplistan)	25
Switzerland (Schweizer Hitparade)	32
UK Singles (Official Charts)	13
UK Airplay (Music Week)	6
US Billboard Hot 100	79
US Adult Contemporary (Billboard)	29
US Alternative Airplay (Billboard)	3
US Cash Box Top 100	68

2025 weekly chart performance for "Caribbean Blue"
Chart (2025)	Peak position
Russia Streaming (TopHit)	99

=== Year-end charts ===
Year-end chart performance for "Caribbean Blue"
Chart (1992)	Position
US Modern Rock Tracks (Billboard)	12

== Certifications ==
Certifications and sales for "Caribbean Blue"
Region	Certification	Certified units/sales
New Zealand (RMNZ)	Gold	15,000^{‡}
United Kingdom (BPI)	Gold	400,000^{‡}
^{‡} Sales+streaming figures based on certification alone.

== Release history ==
Release dates and formats for "Caribbean Blue"
Region	Date	Format(s)	Label(s)	Ref.
United Kingdom	7 October 1991	7-inch vinyl; 12-inch vinyl; CD; cassette	WEA	
Australia	4 November 1991	CD; cassette	WEA	
Japan	10 November 1991	Mini-CD	WEA	
