= Dictionaries of the Polish language =

Reference works for the Polish language

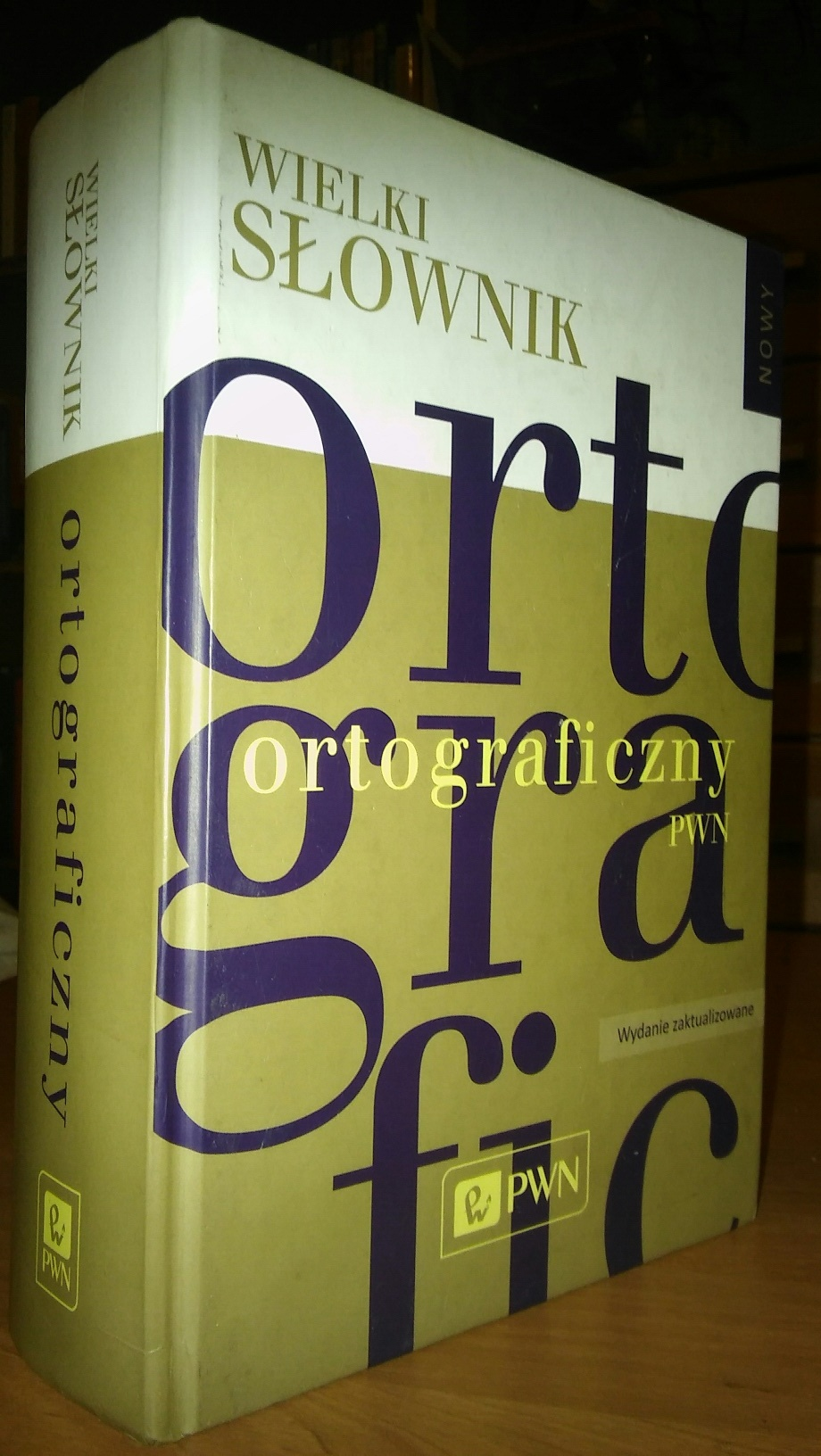
A modern dictionary of Polish language (here, an orthographical dictionary – Wielki słownik ortograficzny – published by PWN in 2016)

The earliest dictionaries of the Polish language were bilingual aids, usually Polish–Latin, and date to the 15th century. The first dictionary dedicated solely to the Polish language was published in the early 19th century. Many dictionaries of the Polish language are named simply "the Dictionary of the Polish Language" (Polish: Słownik języka polskiego) or in similar fashion.

== Bilingual ==
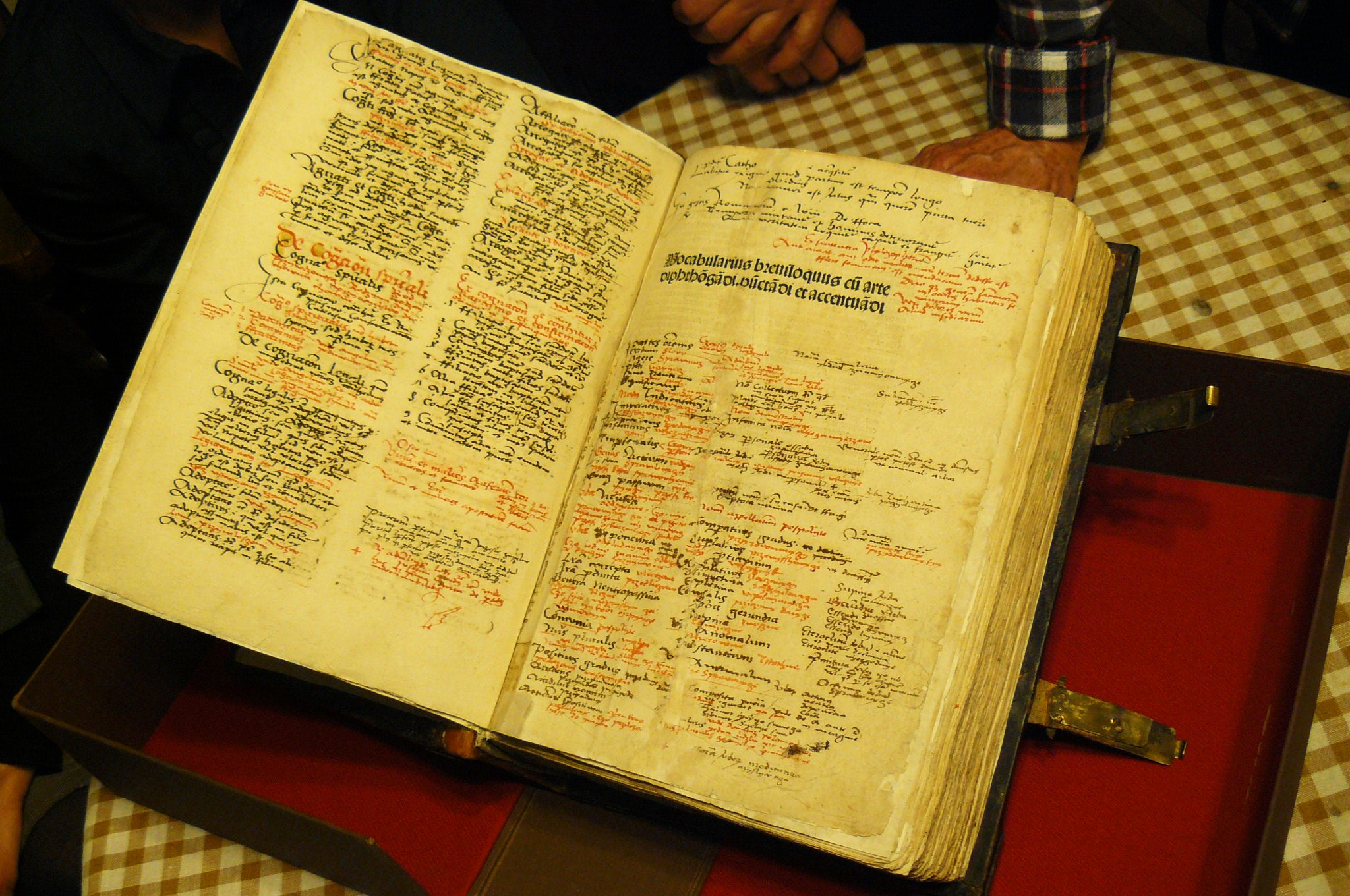
One of the earliest Polish-Latin dictionaries, Vocabularis breviloquus, from 1532

The first Polish dictionaries took the form of Polish–Latin (or more correctly, Old Polish–Latin) bilingual translation aids and date to the 15th century. The oldest known one is the Wokabularz trydencki from 1424; it contains about 500 entries, and is associated with the Prince Alexander of Masovia. The largest of those earliest dictionaries was the Silesian Mamotrekt kaliski (from c. 1470), with about 7,000 entries. The 16th century saw a proliferation of printed dictionaries; the first of those were written abroad and reprinted in Poland. The first such dictionary was the trilingual German–Latin–Polish Dictionarius Ioannis Murmellii variarum rerum from 1526. It had about 2,500 entries and was based on the work of the Dutch scholar Johannes Murmellius and published in Poland by Hieronim Wietor (most likely with Wietor responsible for the German part, and Hieronim Spiczyński for the Polish). Dozens of other bilingual Polish dictionaries were published in the subsequent centuries by scholars such as Bartłomiej of Bydgoszcz, Johann Reuchlin, Jan Mączyński, Nicolaus Volckmar, Grzegorz Knapski and others.

== General ==
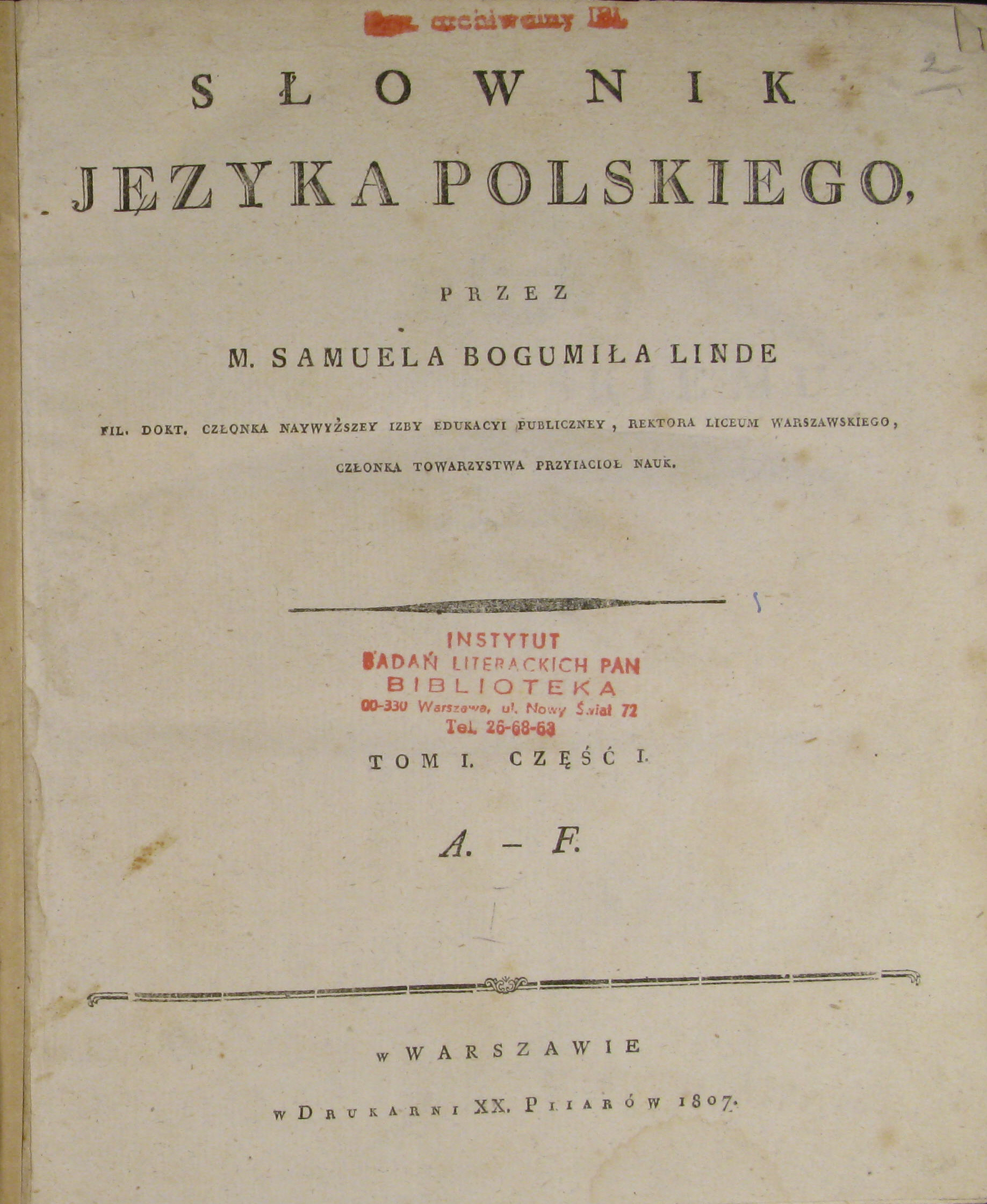
Title page of the first volume of Linde's 1807 work, the first dictionary of Polish language.

Many dictionaries in the Polish language and dedicated to the Polish language bear the generic name Słownik języka polskiego (lit. the Dictionary of the Polish Language). The first such dictionary was published by Samuel Linde in the early 19th century (in six volumes from 1807 to 1814) and had 60,000 entries. Numerous other dictionaries of the Polish language have been published since. The ones following in Linde's path include the 110,000-entry Słownik języka polskiego published in Wilno in 1861 by a group of Polish scholars led by Aleksander Zdanowicz and the 270,000-entry Słownik języka polskiego edited by Jan Aleksander Karłowicz, Adam Kryński and Władysław Niedźwiedzki, published in several volumes from 1900 to 1927. After World War II, a major dictionary of the Polish language was the Słownik języka polskiego of Witold Doroszewski, published in volumes from 1958 to 1969, which quickly became considered a new classic.

As of the early 21st century, the largest dictionary of the Polish language is the 50-volume Praktyczny słownik współczesnej polszczyzny (published from 1994 to 2005) edited by Halina Zgółkowa. Several newer dictionaries are published on the Internet and are freely accessible to the public; they include the Słownik języka polskiego at Polish Wiktionary and the Wielki słownik języka polskiego edited by Piotr Żmigrodzki of the Polish Language Institute of the Polish Academy of Sciences (IJP PAN).

== Specialized ==
There are also many specialized dictionaries in Polish. Some are focused on the Polish language, such as the etymological Słownik etymologiczny języka polskiego (from 1927, edited by Aleksander Brückner); but many others focus on non-language topics, such as the Polish Biographical Dictionary.

== See also ==
- History of Polish
- Polish proverbs
