= Paradisus Judaeorum =

Polish epigram

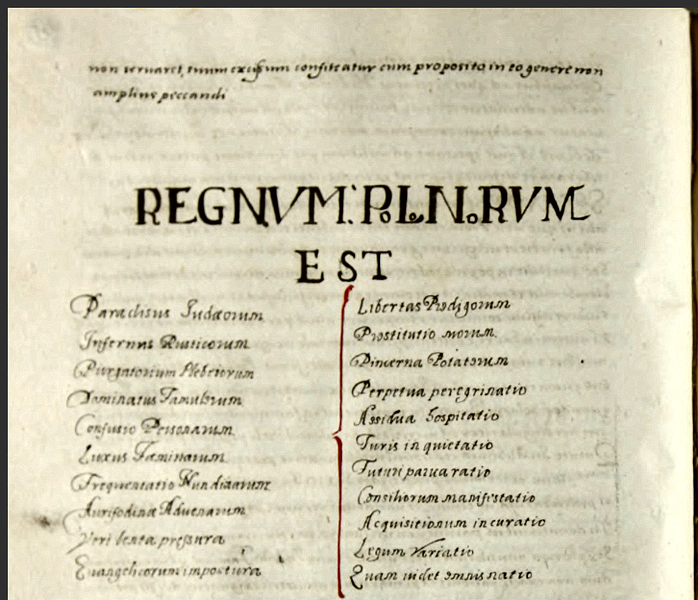
1605 Latin text that has been described as a pasquil "planted" at celebration of the 11 December 1605 wedding of Poland's King Sigismund III Vasa to Constance of Austria.

"Regnum Polonorum est Paradisus Judaeorum" is the opening line of an anonymous 1606 Latin pasquil, or pasquinade (satire), which can be rendered in English as "The Kingdom of Poland is a Paradise for Jews", and which is composed of a series of two-word predicates designed to describe the Polish kingdom in an unflattering light. In 1937, Stanisław Kot surmised that the pasquil's author may have been a Polish Catholic townsman, perhaps a cleric, criticizing what he regarded as defects of the realm.

In time the Latin pasquil evolved into a Polish-language quadripartite saying, or byword – "Poland was heaven for the nobility, purgatory for townfolk, hell for peasants, paradise for Jews" – that pointed key social disparities within the Polish–Lithuanian Commonwealth (1569–1795): privileged nobility, struggling townspeople, enserfed peasantry, and a relatively prosperous and self-governing Jewish community.

Interpretations of the 1606 pasquil's opening phrase "paradisus Judaeorum" generally concur that the anonymous author viewed the Jews as enjoying undue privileges in Poland. Other authors recast the phrase as a reference to the Polish-Lithuanian Commonwealth as a safe haven for Jewish communities, particularly those who lived on the latifundia of magnates as lease-holders, lessees, and administrators.

== History and versions ==
Polish literary historian Stanisław Kot provides the earliest printed attestation (pictured), which begins "Regnum Polonorum est Paradisus Judaeorum", in an anonymous 1606 Latin text, one of two that are jointly known by the Polish title, Paskwiliusze na królewskim weselu podrzucone ("Pasquils Planted at Royal Wedding"), referring to the wedding of Sigismund III Vasa and Constance of Austria that had taken place on 11 December 1605.

Of the two texts attributed to the same anonymous author, the part that became the enduring saying appeared in "Regnum Polonorum est" ("The Kingdom of Poland Is"). (Note: Stanisław Kot (1937): " ... dwa krótkie utwory łacińskie, które odtad spotykamy razem w kopu rękopisach i drukach, często nawet złaczone w jedna całość .... W rękopisie Czartoryskich ... dano im wspólny tytuł: 'Pasquilllusze na królewskim weselu podrzucone.' ... I drugi utwór, 'Regnum Polonorum' ... stwierdza ... pomyślność Żydów".) Parts of the text were quoted in Bishop Stanisław Zremba's 1623 "Okulary na rozchody w Koronie..." and were included in a 1636 work by Szymon Starowolski. The phrase, "heaven for the nobility", which became a regular part of the pasquil, only appeared in print towards the end of the century in the German Jesuit priest Michael Radau's 1672 Orator extemporeneus, though Polish-literature scholar Julian Krzyżanowski suggests that Radau had coined the phrase as early as 1641.

Kot writes that other versions, published in Poland in the 17th and 18th centuries, criticized the clergy, Gypsies, Italians, Germans, Armenians, and even Scots: groups were added or removed from the list, depending on the authors' views and allegiances. (Note: Stanisław Kot (1937): "Zaznaczyliśmy już, że w miarę lat i szerzenia się odpisów, satyra ulegała odmianie" (p. 11); "widać więc, że autor, choć katolik, nie lubi Włochów" (p. 12); "Inaczej oczywiście przekształcać musiał teksty protestantów ... usnięto więc zwrot o oszukaństwie ewangelików, przenosząc ten brzydki zwrot na cyganów a dodając chciwość kleru" (p. 12); "Jeszcze samodzielniej przerabiał satyrę na Polskę panslawista Chorwat ... Juraj Križanić ... entuzjastę słowiańszczyzny raził, jak widać, w Polsce nadmiar cudzoziemców i ich wpływy: Cyganów, Niemców, Ormian, Szkotów i Żydów, skąd Polska przedstawia się jako siedziba włóczęgów" (pp. 12–13). ("We have already mentioned that with the years, as copies spread, the satire underwent changes" [p. 11]; "the author, though a Catholic, does not like Italians" [p. 12]; "Of course, he had to reshape the Protestants' texts differently... so the phrase about Protestant impostures was removed, transferring the odious phrase to the Gypsies and adding the greed of the clergy" [p. 12]; "The satire on Poland was reshaped even more independently by the Panslavist Croat... Juraj Križanić... the devotee of Slavdom was evidently bothered by the superabundance of foreigners in Poland and by their influences: Gypsies, Germans, Armenians, Scots, and Jews, giving Poland the aspect of a seat of vagabonds". [pp. 12-13].)) In various versions of the pasquil, phrases appear in varying order and sometimes do not appear at all; there are also some minor changes in wording. Juraj Križanić, for example, writes "paradisus Hebraeorum" ("paradise for Hebrews") rather than "paradise for Jews". A five-part variant appears in Palatinum Reginae Liberatis (c. 1670) by the Polish Jesuit Walenty Pęski, who omits mention of the townspeople, instead adding "purgatory for royalty" and "limbo for clergy". Another five-part 1861 German variant ("Polen ist der Bauern Hölle, der Juden Paradies, der Burger Fegefeuer, der Edelleute Himmel, und der Fremden Goldgrube" – "Poland is hell for peasants, paradise for Jews, purgatory for townspeople, heaven for the nobility, and goldmine for foreigners") includes the 1606 pasquil's "goldmine for foreigners", which did not make it into the modern saying that only lists the nobility, townspeople, peasants, and Jews.

Samuel Adalberg's 1887 paremiology records a four-part version ("Polska niebem dla szlachty, czyśćcem dla mieszczan, piekłem dla chłopów, a rajem dla Żydów" – "Poland is heaven for the nobility, purgatory for townspeople, hell for peasants, and paradise for Jews") that is closest to the 1606 original, differing from its opening lines only in the order of the phrases and in including "heaven for the nobility".

Three variants of the 1606 pasquil appeared in shorter Latin versions, by the Croat Juraj Križanić (1664), the Italian Giovan Battista Pacichelli (1685), and the Slovak Daniel Krman (1708-9). The first translation of the 1606 Polish pasquil from Latin into Polish appeared in the 1630s. Kot himself translated it in 1937 and Krzyżanowski did in 1958.

== Pasquil ==
The identity of the author is unknown. Kot wrote that he may have been a Catholic townsman, perhaps a priest jealous of the influence of Jews and others, such as Protestants and nobility, who competed with Catholic townspeople. Konrad Matyjaszek describes it as "expressing anti-gentry and anti-Jewish sentiments" According to Barbara Kirshenblatt-Gimblett, it was political satire, "a pasquinade critical of everything in the Polish–Lithuanian Commonwealth—foreigners, immigrants, 'heretics,' peasants, burghers, and servants, and also Jews." (Note: Barbara Kirshenblatt-Gimblett (The Polish Review, 2016): "Similarly, the Wall of Words in the Paradisus Iudaeorum gallery (1569–1648) is a kind of chorus, sometimes in harmony, sometimes cacophonous. The quotations here play on the ambiguity of 'Paradisus Iudaeorum,' a formulation from a pasquinade critical of everything in the Polish–Lithuanian Commonwealth—foreigners, immigrants, 'heretics,' peasants, burgers, and servants, and also Jews. To characterize the Commonwealth as a Jewish paradise is a way of saying that Jews had it 'too good.' The Wall of Words, by assembling different perspectives, invites the visitor to consider to what extent and in what ways the Commonwealth was good for the Jews or bad for the Jews, worse for the Jews or better—and above all introduces the idea of a spectrum of relations, rather than a binary of good or bad. Our multivoiced approach and authored voices are critical to the openness of the narration and therefore to the openness of the historical narrative.")

Kot thinks the anonymous author of the 1606 pasquil may have been inspired by pasquils from other European countries. A similar sixteenth-century saying had depicted England as "the paradise of women, the hell of horses, and the purgatory of servants". Variants of it had described France and Italy.

The pasquil became popular abroad, where it was generally seen as critical of the Commonwealth in its entirety. Some 17th- and 18th-century Polish authors, themselves either nobles or clients of the nobility, saw it as an attack on the nobility's Golden Freedoms and ascribed it to a foreign author, refusing to accept that a scathing criticism of Polish society could come from a Polish author. Kot writes that the pasquils were some of the most pointed examples of self-criticism originating in Polish society and that the nobility's refusal to accept that such criticism could come from within that society reflects sadly on the deterioration of Polish discourse in the 18th and 19th centuries. (Note: Stanisław Kot (1937): "W miarę jak opinia szlachecka coraz bardziej zwracała się przeciwko wszelkiej krytyce i tylko na pochwały nadstawiała ucho coraz trudniej było publicystom przytaczać tak gorzką satyrę. ... I nie wypadało przypuścić, aby jej autorem mógł być Polak (p. 16). Podkreślmy, że te cudzoziemskie nazwiska autorów i ich dzieł są to fikcje ... Pęski uważał, że dogodniej mu wprowadzić do dyskusji owe zarzuty jako rozgłaszane przez cudzoziemców, niż gdyby im przyznał polskie pochodzenie. Zmyślił więc nazwiska autorów i dzieł (p. 19) ... Dla ludzi XVIII wieku satyra nasza uchodziła już tylko za utwór obserwatorów cudzoziemskich (p. 27)." "Omawiane powyżej satyry ... nie były u szlachty popularne. ... kierowały całe swoje ostrze przeciwko szlachcie. Sa one jednym z najdosadniejszych wyrazów autokrytki życia społecznego i gospodarczego, moralnego i politycznego w Polsce. Ale po [Starowolskim] nikt już nie podejmie ani gospodarczo-społecznej krytki ani sprawy polskiej. Jedynie tylko dyskusja żydowska jako najmniej obrażająca szlachtę, będzie odtąd nawiązywać do naszych satyr. I to jeszcze z zastrzeżeniem, iż podaje się je wyłącznie jako produkt cudzoziemski, jako złośliwe uwagi obcych o stosunkach polskich; uznać ich za wytwór samokrytyki polskiej już nie wypadało.")

== Saying ==
Over time, the 1606 pasquil lapsed into obscurity, reduced to a popular saying (often described as a proverb) that described the historical Polish–Lithuanian Commonwealth (1569–1795) as "heaven for the nobility, purgatory for townspeople, hell for peasants, paradise for Jews." The saying contrasts the disparate situations of four social classes in the Polish–Lithuanian Commonwealth. Therein, the privileged nobility (szlachta) figures at the top ("heaven for the nobility") along with the Jews ("paradise for the Jews"), the townspeople (or burghers) are in the middle, and the impoverished, usually enserfed peasantry are at the bottom ("hell for peasants").

By the 16th century, the position of townspeople in the Commonwealth had been in decline (hence, "purgatory for townspeople"). The situation of the Commonwealth's Jews, while similar to that of the townspeople, was fairly secure and prosperous, particularly compared to the situation of Jews in most other European countries. The comparison of the Jewish and noble classes has generally been described as exaggerated, as the Jewish situation in early modern Poland, while privileged compared to that of many other classes in the Commonwealth, and to the Jewish position in many other contemporary countries, was hardly idyllic.

Due to its criticism of the nobility, the saying was most popular among townspeople; much less so among the nobility, whose writers, if they referred to it, used it mainly in the context of Polish Jewry. The saying has been described as still (as of 2004) very popular in Poland, and as often influencing people's views about the situation of the social classes, particularly the Jews, in the Commonwealth.

== Jewish paradise ==
Several scholars and public figures have commented on the Latin phrase "paradisus Judaeorum" ("Jewish paradise", or "paradise for Jews") which forms part of the above saying. Some authors have read the phrase as a comment on the favorable situation of Jews in the Kingdom of Poland (and subsequently in the Polish–Lithuanian Commonwealth), a polity that was notable for having granted Jews special privileges in the 1264 Statute of Kalisz while Jews faced persecution and murder in western Europe.

For that reason, the phrase has subsequently been used to refer to what has been called a golden age of Jewish life in Poland. (Note: The rector Wojciech Nowak attributed the origin of the phrase instead to the 16th-century Polish rabbi Moses Isserles in a promotional blurb in 2014.) John Klier, in his book about Eastern European Jewish history, titles a chapter about the history of the Jews in Poland, "Poland–Lithuania: 'Paradise for Jews'"; and Gershon Hundert likewise uses the phrase in the title of his 1997 article "Poland: Paradisus Judaeorum", published in the Journal of Jewish Studies, in which he writes:

"The Polish Jewish community was vibrant, creative, proud and self-confident [...]. Their neighbours knew this as well, referring to Poland as Paradisus Judaeorum [...]. This is hyperbole of course[.] [...] Jews were the objects of continuous animosity on the part of significant elements of the population."

There is little doubt that the original phrase was antisemitic, related to the Jewish arendator privilege in the Polish Kingdom and Polish–Lithuanian Commonwealth. (Note: Antony Polonsky (Studia Litteraria et Historica, 2017): "The initial part of this gallery [in the POLIN Museum of the History of Polish Jews] features a set of quotations that show that it [Poland] was not a Paradisus Judaeorum, that this was a mere slogan ... Konrad Matyjaszek: "The content of the 17th century text which the notion Paradisus is taken from is not problematized there. It is not explained that the text is antisemitic." "The term Paradisus Judaeorum [Paradise for Jews] has been present in Polish culture since the 17th century. It comes from an anonymous text expressing anti-gentry and anti-Jewish sentiments, which was published in Latin in 1606 and titled Paskwiliusze na królewskim weselu podrzucone [Lampoons planted at the royal wedding party]. The anonymous writer uses the phrase Paradisus Judaeorum to express his conviction that Poland is ruled by Jews and that they enjoy excessive privileges (Kot, 1937; Tokarska-Bakir, 2004, p. 54)" (square brackets in original).) Piotr Konieczny maintains that the expression has mostly lost its originally "xenophobic and antisemitic" connotations, and identifies this change as an example of linguistic reclamation.

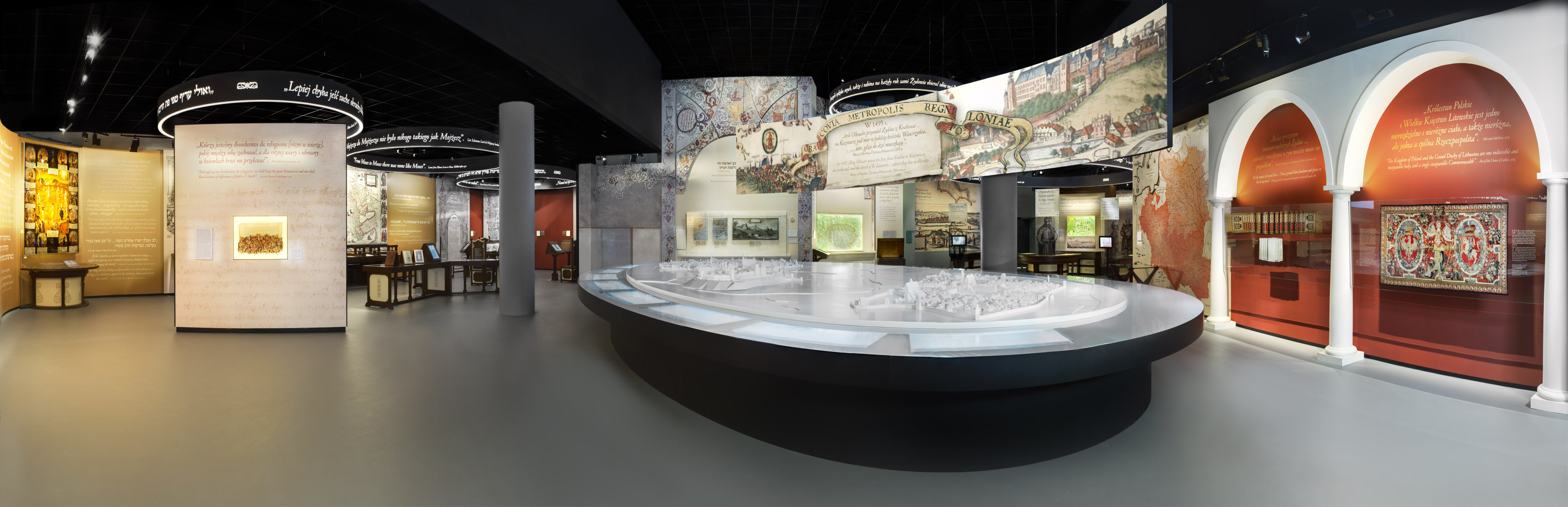
Paradisus Iudaeorum (Jewish Paradise) gallery, POLIN Museum of the History of Polish Jews, Warsaw, Poland

In the POLIN Museum of the History of Polish Jews, which opened in Warsaw in 2013, a gallery covering the "Golden Age of Polish Jewry" is named "Paradisus Iudaeorum". The phrase appears as epigram in that gallery, which ends in a "Corridor of Fire symbolis[ing] the Khmelnytsky Uprising" (1648-1657)". Joanna Tokarska-Bakir has criticized the gallery name, maintaining that "a 17th-century polemic[al] concept condemning the rampant prevalence of infidels" as the name for the gallery is disrespectful. Barbara Kirshenblatt-Gimblett, Program Director of the Core Exhibition of the POLIN Museum, responded that the intention is to engage the viewer in a complex debate going beyond a binary black-and-white oversimplification. Kamil Kijek wrote (in 2017) that, out of context, the phrase can be confusing, but within a broader context it represents a much more complex, nuanced relationship between Jews and non-Jewish Poles.

== Latin texts ==
Year	Author	Text	Translation	Notes
1606	Anonymous	Regnum Polonorum est paradisus Judaeorum infernus rusticorum purgatorium Plebeiorum; Dominatus famulorum confusio personarum luxus foeminarum frequentia nundinarum aurifodinae advenarum Cleri lenta praessura Evangelicorum impostura libertas prodigorum prostitutio morum pincerna potatorum perpetua peregrinatio assidua hospitatio juris inquietatio consiliorum manifestatio aquisitorum injuriatio Legum variatio quam videt omnis natio	The Kingdom of Poland is paradise for Jews hell for peasants purgatory for townspeople ascendance of courtiers confusion of roles looseness of women loitering at markets goldmine for foreigners oppression of clergy Protestant impostures freedom for wastrels prostitution of morals cupbearer to drunkards perpetual peregrination constant entertaining law-breaking disclosure of counsels disregard for acquisitions variance of laws as all the people see.	Given the Polish title Paskwiliusze na królewskim weselu podrzucone. Also appears in Szymon Starowolski in 1636.
1664	Juraj Križanić	Polonia est Nova Babylonia, Tsiganorum, Germanorum, Armenorum et Scotorum colonia; Paradisus Hebraeorum, infernus rusticorum; aurifodina advenarum, sedes gentium vagabundarum; comitiatorum assidua hospitatio, populi perpetua inquietatio, alienigenarum dominatio. Quam despuit omnis natio.	Poland is the new Babylon, a colony of Gypsies, Germans, Armenians, and Scots; paradise for Hebrews, hell for peasants; goldmine for foreigners, seat of vagabonds; the courtiers' constant entertaining, the people's perpetual disquiet, domination by foreigners. Which disturbs all the people.	
1672	Michael Radau	Clarum Regnum Polonorum est coelum nobiliorum, paradisus Judaeorum, purgatorium plebejorum, et infernum rusticorum...	The illustrious Kingdom of Poland is heaven for the nobility, paradise for Jews, purgatory for townspeople, hell for peasants...	
1685	Giovan Battista Pacichelli	Clarum regnum Polonorum; Est coelum nobiliorum, Infernus rusticorum, Paradisus Judaeorum, Aurifodina advenarum, Causa luxus foeminarum. Multo quidem dives lanis, Semper tamen egens pannis; Et copiam in lino serit, Sed externas diligit; Caro emptis gloriatur, Empta parvo aspernatur.	The illustrious Kingdom of Poland is heaven for the nobility, hell for peasants, paradise for Jews, goldmine for foreigners, cause of looseness of women. Much productive of wool, always nevertheless in need of clothes; though it produces copious linen, yet it loves the foreign; it prizes what is bought dear, disdaining what is bought cheap.	
1708–1709	Daniel Krman	Clarum regnum Polonorum est coelum nobiliorum, paradisus Judaeorum, purgatorium plebeiorum et infernus rusticorum, causa luxus foeminarum, multis quidem dives lanis, semper tamen egens pannis, et copiam lini serit, sed externam telam quaerit, merces externas diligit, domi paratas negligit, caro emptis gloriatur, empta parvo adspernatur.	The illustrious Kingdom of Poland is heaven for the nobility, paradise for Jews, purgatory for townspeople, and hell for peasants, cause of looseness of women, much productive of wool, always nevertheless in need of clothes, though it produces copious linen, yet it seeks foreign fabric, it loves foreign goods, it neglects domestic products, it prizes what is bought dear, disdaining what is bought cheap.	
