= Japanese proverbs =

Linguistic family of idiomatic expressions

A Japanese proverb (諺, ことわざ, kotowaza) may take the form of:

- a short saying (言い習わし, iinarawashi),
- an idiomatic phrase (慣用句, kan'yōku), or
- a four-character idiom (四字熟語, yojijukugo).

Although "proverb" and "saying" are practically synonymous, the same cannot be said about "idiomatic phrase" and "four-character idiom". Not all kan'yōku and yojijukugo are proverbial. For instance, the kan'yōku kitsune no yomeiri (狐の嫁入り, literally 'a fox's wedding', meaning "a sunshower") and the yojijukugo koharubiyori (小春日和, literally 'small spring weather', meaning "Indian summer" – warm spring-like weather in early winter) are not proverbs. To be considered a proverb, a word or phrase must express a common truth or wisdom; it cannot be a mere noun.

== Origin ==
Numerous Asian proverbs, including Japanese, appear to be derived from older Chinese proverbs, although it often is impossible to be completely sure about the direction of cultural influences (and hence, the origins of a particular proverb or idiomatic phrase).

Because traditional Japanese culture was tied to agriculture, many Japanese proverbs are derived from agricultural customs and practices. Some are from the board game Go (e.g., fuseki o utsu (布石を打つ)), the tea ceremony (e.g., ichi go ichi e (一期一会)), and Buddhism. Many four-character idioms are from Chinese philosophy written in Classical Chinese, in particular "The Analects" by Confucius. (I no naka no kawazu (井の中の蛙, 'a frog in a well') is Classical Chinese, from the Zhuangzi.)

== Usage ==
Japanese commonly use proverbs, often citing just the first part of common phrases for brevity. For example, one might say i no naka no kawazu (井の中の蛙, 'a frog in a well') to refer to the proverb i no naka no kawazu, taikai o shirazu (井の中の蛙、大海を知らず, 'a frog in a well cannot conceive of the ocean'). Whereas proverbs in English are typically multi-worded phrases (e.g. "kill two birds with one stone"), Japanese yojijukugo borrow from Chinese and compactly convey the concept in one compound word (e.g., isseki nichō (一石二鳥, 'one stone two birds')).

== Examples ==
=== Sayings ===
- 出る杭は打たれる。
  - Deru kui wa utareru
  - Literally: The stake that sticks up gets hammered down.
  - Meaning: If you stand out, you will be subject to criticism.
- 知らぬが仏。
  - Shiranu ga hotoke
  - Literally: Not knowing is Buddha.
  - Meaning: Ignorance is bliss. / What you don't know can't hurt you.
- 見ぬが花。
  - Minu ga hana
  - Literally: Not seeing is a flower.
  - Meaning: Reality can't compete with imagination.
- 花は桜木人は武士
  - Hana wa sakuragi, hito wa bushi
  - Literally: Of flowers, the cherry blossom; of men, the warrior.
  - Meaning: The best of both worlds.
- 井の中の蛙大海を知らず
  - I no naka no kawazu taikai wo shirazu
  - Literally: The frog in the well knows nothing of the ocean.
  - Meaning: People who experience very little have a narrow world view. / He that stays in the valley shall never get over the hill.
- かわいい子には旅をさせよ
  - Kawaii ko ni wa tabi wo saseyo
  - Literally: Let your darling child travel.
  - Meaning: If you don't discipline your child, they will not learn obedience. / Spare the rod and spoil the child.
- 案ずるより産むが易しい。
  - Anzuru yori umu ga yasashii
  - Literally: Giving birth to a baby is easier than worrying about it.
  - Meaning: Fear is greater than the danger. / An attempt is sometimes easier than expected.
- 船頭多くして船山に登る
  - Sendou ooku shite fune yama ni noboru
  - Literally: Too many captains will steer the ship up a mountain.
  - Meaning: Something may not be successful if too many people work on it at the same time. / Too many cooks spoil the broth.
- 蛙の子は蛙
  - Kaeru no ko wa kaeru
  - Literally: The child of a frog is frog.
  - Meaning: A child grows up similar to their parents. / Like father, like son. / The apple doesn't fall too far from the tree.
- 馬鹿は風邪を引かない
  - Baka wa kaze o hikanai
  - Literally: Idiots don't catch colds.
  - Meaning: Carefree people are less likely to notice they are sick or to worry about being sick.

=== Idiomatic phrases ===
- 猫に小判
  - Neko ni koban
  - Literally: Gold coins to a cat.
  - Meaning: Casting pearls before swine / Giving something of value to a recipient that does not value it.
- 七転び八起き
  - Nanakorobi yaoki
  - Literally: Fall seven times and stand up eight
  - Meaning: When life knocks you down, stand back up; What matters is not the bad that happened, but what one does after.
- 猿も木から落ちる
  - Saru mo ki kara ochiru
  - Literally: Even monkeys fall from trees
  - Meaning: Anyone can make a mistake.
- 花より団子
  - Hana yori dango
  - Literally: Dumplings rather than flowers
  - Meaning: To prefer substance over form, as in to prefer to be given functional, useful items (such as dumplings) instead of merely decorative items (such as flowers).
- 馬の耳に念仏
  - Uma no mimi ni nenbutsu
  - Literally: Chanting nenbutsu to a horse.
  - Meaning: Attempting to make an argument to a party that will not listen. / Preaching to the deaf.
- 水と油
  - Mizu to abura
  - Literally: Water and oil.
  - Meaning: Totally incompatible. / [Go together like] oil and water.

=== Four-character idioms ===
- 十人十色
  - jūnin toiro
  - Literally: ten persons, ten colors
  - Meaning: To each his own. / Different strokes for different folks.
- 因果応報
  - inga ōhō
  - Literally: Cause brings result / bad causes bring bad results
  - Meaning: what goes around comes around
  - Note: this is a Buddhist sentiment that emphasizes the idea of karmic retribution.
- 弱肉強食
  - jaku niku kyō shoku
  - Literally: The weak are meat; the strong eat.
  - Meaning: Survival of the fittest.

== See also ==
- List of proverbial phrases (used in English)
- Chinese proverbs
- Japanese culture
- Japanese language
- Korean proverbs
- Polish proverbs
- Russian proverbs
- Spanish proverbs
