= Chinese proverbs =

Linguistic family of idiomatic expressions

Many Chinese proverbs (yànyǔ 諺語) exist, some of which have entered English in forms that are of varying degrees of faithfulness. A notable example is "A journey of a thousand miles begins with a single step", from the Dao De Jing, ascribed to Laozi. They cover all aspects of life, and are widely used in everyday speech, in contrast to the decline of the use of proverbs in Western cultures. The majority are distinct from high literary forms such as xiehouyu and chengyu, and are common sayings of usually anonymous authorship, originating through "little tradition" rather than "great tradition".

== Collections and sources ==
In the preface and introduction to his 1875 categorized collection of Chinese proverbs, Wesleyan missionary William Scarborough observed that there had theretofore been very few European-language works on the subject, listing John Francis Davis' 1823 Chinese Moral Maxims, Paul Hubert Perny's 1869 Proverbes Chinois, and Justus Doolittle's 1872 Vocabulary and Handbook of the Chinese Language as exhaustive on the subject to that point. He also observed that there were few collections in Chinese languages. Two such collections he named as ‌Chien-pên-hsien-wen, "A Book of Selected Virtuous Lore" (a.k.a. ‌Tsêng-huang, "Great Collection"), and the ‌Ming-hsin-pao-chien, "A Precious Mirror to throw light on the mind".

He observed that the proverbs themselves are numerous, with the whole of China probably able to supply some 20,000, a figure that modern scholars agree with. Sources of such proverbs he found in the aforementioned collections, in the ‌Yu-hsio ("Youth's Instructor"), the 1859 ‌Chieh-jen-i, the 1707 ‌Chia-pao-chulan-ci ("Complete Collection of Family Treasures"), the 聖語Sheng-yu ("Sacred Edict"), the ‌Kan-ying p'ien ("Book of Rewards and Punishments"), and 主子家言Chutzu-chia-yen ("The Household Rules of the Philosopher Chu").

The modern popularity of Chinese proverbs in Chinese literature led to an explosion in the availability of dictionaries, glossaries, and studies of them in the middle to late 20th century.

== Definition, forms, and character ==
There are two set literary forms in Chinese that have been much studied:

- Xiehouyu (Chinese: 歇後語, pinyin: xiēhòuyǔ); two-part expression whose latter part is omitted
- Chengyu (Chinese: 成語, pinyin: chéngyŭ); most often 4-character phrases that carry conventional wisdom

However, Chinese proverbs are primarily not these high literary forms, but rather the product of thousands of years of an oral culture of peasant people, often illiterate. The informal and oft-quoted proverbs of everyday conversation are largely not the sayings of Confucius, but are rather of anonymous origin. Many sayings commonly attributed to Confucius, often in the form "Confucius said...", are not correctly attributed, or their attribution is disputed by scholars. Whilst the sayings of philosophers such as Laozi and Confucius form part of the "great tradition" (a notion introduced by Robert Redfield in 1956) amongst Chinese literati over the centuries; proverbs largely come from the "little tradition" of the overwhelming peasant majority of Chinese society. Professor of linguistics John Rosenhow of the University of Chicago characterized most such proverbs as "witty, pomposity-piercing proverbs for which peasants are famous all over the world". Scarborough observed that wit, humour, and puns can be found in abundance.

In terms of form, Scarborough tried to characterize ‌Su-'hua, "Common Sayings", more clearly than a metaphorical description by Alfred Lord Tennyson and by the descriptions of proverb in several contemporary dictionaries, which he stated to be inaccurate descriptions. He observed that most proverbs were couplets, which he divided into three major groups (with a smaller number of minor outliers):

- Antithetical couplets incorporate antithesis; usually have 7 words per line, and have rules about the tones in each line and a prohibition on repetition.
- Connected sentences have fewer rules about composition; but they again incorporate antithesis, a very pointed one.
- Rhymes, with corresponding tones.

Rosenhow made similar observations on the difficulty of aligning Chinese proverbs with Western definitions of the idea, stating that the closest equivalent Chinese term is ‌yanyu, which itself does not have a single meaning. Sun Zhiping's 1982 definition of ‌yanyu (translated and recounted by Rosenhow) is "complete sentences, expressing a judgement or an inference, [which] may be used to validate [or to] represent [one's] own [individual] views, [whereas] chenyu, xieouyu, and suyu generally can only serve as parts of a sentence, [and are] used to give a concrete description of expression of the quality, state, degree, etc. of some objective material phenomenon".

Rosenhow notes however that some sentence fragments also fall within the category of Chinese proverbs, with ellipsis accounting for their fragmentary natures, and that a better definition is the purpose of Chinese proverbs, which is morally instructional; informing people what to do in a given situation by reference to familiar ideas, and repeatedly used in conversation in order to promote and continue a shared set of values and ways of going about things.

== Influence ==
Numerous Asian proverbs, in particular, Japanese, Vietnamese, and Korean ones, appear to be derived from older Chinese proverbs, although in often is impossible to be completely sure about the direction of cultural influences (and hence, the origins of a particular proverb or idiomatic phrase).

=== Falsely ascribed origin ===
In English, various phrases are used and claimed to be of Chinese origin – "..., as they say in China" or "An ancient Chinese proverb says...", and may be specifically attributed to Confucius, sometimes facetiously. Notable examples include:

- A picture is worth a thousand words – in the modern English form attributed to Fred R. Barnard in the 1920s. The 1949 Home Book of Proverbs, Maxims, and Familiar Phrases quotes Barnard as saying he called it "a Chinese proverb, so that people would take it seriously". An actual Chinese expression, "Hearing something a hundred times isn't better than seeing it once" (百闻不如一见, p bǎi wén bù rú yī jiàn) is sometimes claimed to be the equivalent.
- Chinese word for "crisis" – the claim that the Chinese word for "crisis", simplified Chinese: 危机; traditional Chinese: 危機; pinyin: wēijī; Wade–Giles: wei-chi is "danger" + "opportunity" is a folk etymology, based on a misreading of the second character jī.
- May you live in interesting times – despite being widely attributed as a Chinese curse, there is no known equivalent expression in Chinese. The nearest related Chinese expression translates as "Better to be a dog in times of tranquility than a human in times of chaos." (寧為太平犬，不做亂世人) The expression originates from Volume 3 of the 1627 short story collection by Feng Menglong, Stories to Awaken the World.

== Modern popularity ==
The widespread use of Chinese proverbs in everyday speech, even in the 21st century, contrasts with the decline of the use of proverbs in Western cultures. As stated earlier, they have historically been a part of a long-standing oral culture amongst the Chinese peasantry, and their continued existence in an age of more widespread literacy and written communication is explained by the political events in China of the 20th century.

One factor was the May 4th Movement not only encouraging vernacular language over Literary Chinese but at the same time including proverbs into modern Chinese literature, exemplified by Cheng Wangdao's inclusion of popular sayings in the chapter on quotations in his 1932 Introduction to Rhetoric and by the parting admonition to writers in Hu Shih's 1917 Tentative suggestions for Literary Reform: "Do not avoid popular expressions." The Potato School of writing even required the use of proverbs.

Another factor was the deliberate use of proverbs as a rhetorical technique by leaders such as Mao Zedong addressing primarily peasant audiences. Mao encouraged others to do the same as he himself did, in his 1942 Talks on Literature and Art at the Yan'an Forum, stressing to writers the importance of the use of folk idioms and proverbs in order to make their writing accessible to the majority of their audience.

== Parallels to English proverbs ==
Scarborough noted that there are many proverbs with parallels to European ones, including: "Too many cooks spoil the broth", with the parallel "Seven hands and eight feet", "a pig in a poke" with the parallel "a cat in a bag", and "When in Rome, do as the Romans do", with "Wherever you go, talk as the people of the place talk."

== See also ==
- List of proverbial phrases (used in English)
- Japanese proverbs
- Korean proverbs
- Polish proverbs
- Russian proverbs
- Spanish proverbs

== Sources ==
- Rohsenow, John S. (2003). ABC Dictionary of Chinese Proverbs (Yanyu). University of Hawaii Press. ISBN 9780824827700.
- Scarborough, William (1875). A Collection of Chinese Proverbs. Shanghai: American Presbyterian mission Press. (A Collection of Chinese Proverbs at the Internet Archive)
- Herzberg, Larry (2016). "Chinese Proverbs and Popular Sayings". In Chan, Sin-Wai (ed.). The Routledge Encyclopedia of the Chinese Language. Routledge. ISBN 9781317382492.
