= Taking liberties =

Taking liberties may be:

- Taking Liberties, a compilation by Elvis Costello
- Taking Liberties (film)
- Taking Liberties (Frasier episode)

== See also ==
- Taking the piss
- When have we eaten from the same dish?
