= Polish proverbs =

Adages in the Polish language

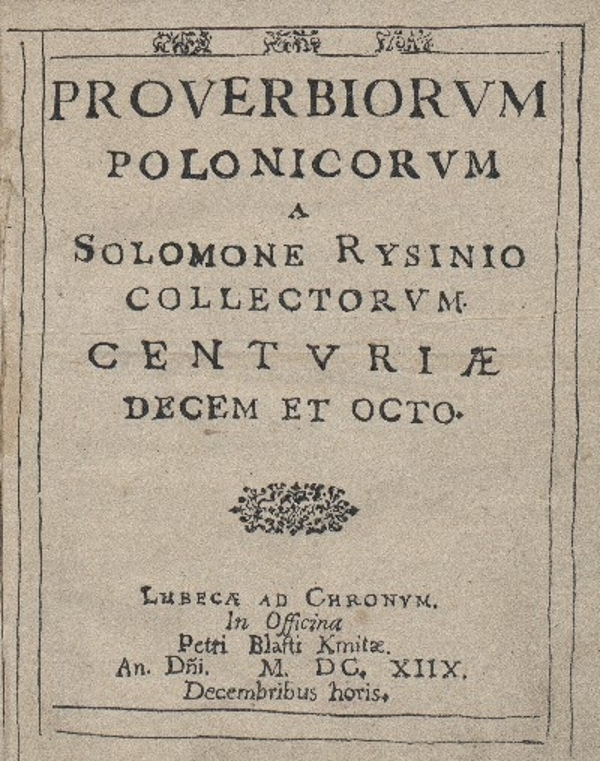
Proverbiorum Polonicorum a Solomone Rysinio (Polish Proverbs by Salomon Rysiński), a 1618 collection of Polish proverbs (in Latin), recognized as the first work dedicated to collecting Polish proverbs

Tens of thousands of Polish proverbs exist; many have origins in the Middle Ages. The oldest known Polish proverb dates to 1407. A number of scholarly studies of Polish proverbs (paremiology) exist; and Polish proverbs have been collected in numerous dictionaries and similar works from the 17th century onward. Studies in Polish paremiology have begun in the 19th century. The largest and most reputable collection of Polish proverbs to date, edited by Julian Krzyżanowski, was published in 1970s.

== History ==
The oldest known Polish proverb, dating to 1407, was written in Latin and Old Polish: "Quando sø lika drø, tunc ea drzi", which translates to "When bast can be torn, then tear it." This is analogous to "Make hay while the sun shines" or "Strike while the iron is hot". The oldest Polish proverb thus reminded peasants to seize the opportunity when the time was right – to harvest bast in the spring, which they would turn into bast shoes, textiles, and cordage in winter.

Some Polish proverbs have been medieval translations of Latin classics. Thus, "Oko pańskie konia tuczy" – "The master's eye fattens the horse" – comes from the Latin "Oculus domini saginat equum"; and the latter Latin proverb was likely translated from a still older Persian one. Other proverbs have taken their origin from other European languages.

Many proverbs have been popularized by Polish literature. For example, the popularity of "Oko pańskie konia tuczy" has been attributed to its inclusion in Adam Mickiewicz's epic poem, Pan Tadeusz.

== Themes ==
As with proverbs of other peoples around the world, Polish proverbs concern many topics; at least 2,000 Polish proverbs relate to weather and climate alone. Many concern classic topics such as fortune and misfortune, religion, family, everyday life, health, love, wealth, and women; others, like the first recorded Polish proverb (referring to bast production), and those about weather, offer practical advice. A theme unique to Polish proverbs is about Poles and Poland; one of the most famous of these states that "Polacy nie gęsi lecz własny język mają" ("Poles are not geese, they have their own tongue"), in a 1562 verse by Mikołaj Rej, and commonly interpreted as stressing the importance of having one's own national language (here, Polish).

Similarly to English proverbs, Polish proverbs have been criticized for being sexist.

== Polish paremiology ==
Title page of the late 19th century Samuel Adalberg's Księga przysłów polskich, recognized as one of the landmark works in Polish paremiology.

The first known Polish author interested in proverbs was the poet Biernat of Lublin, who in 1522 published a collection of them titled Żywot Ezopa Fryga, mędrca obyczajnego i z przypowieściami jego (The life of Aesop the Phrygian, a Decent Sage, and with His Parables). The first Polish scholar of paremiology was Salomon Rysiński (Solomone Rysinio), who in 1618 published the first known Polish work dedicated solely to collecting and discussing proverbs (Proverbiorum polonicorum a Salomone Rysino collectorum Centuriae decem et octo). This work, first published in Latin, but subsequently in Polish (Przypowieści polskie, przez Salomona Rysińskiego zebrane, a teraz nowo przydane i na wielu miejscach poprawione, 1620), collected over 1,800 proverbs which, according to the author, were "of Polish origin". In 1632, Grzegorz Knapski, a Polish Jesuit, published an even larger collection (in volume three of his Thesaurus Polono-Latino-Graecus), with over 6,000 collected proverbs. In 1658 Polish writer Andrzej Maksymilian Fredro published another collection of proverbs, Przysłowia mów potocznych albo przestrogi obyczajowe, radne, wojenne, which was said to have been widely popular in contemporary Poland.

The 19th century saw the first work dedicated more to analyzing the proverbs and their history than solely collecting them, the Przysłowia narodowe, z wyjaśnieniem źródła, początku oraz sposobu ich użycia, okazujące charakter, zwyczaje i obyczaje, przesądy, starożytności i wspomnienia ojczyste (1830) of Kazimierz Władysław Wóycicki. Other early works on Polish paremiology were published in the 19th century by Oskar Kolberg and Samuel Adalberg, the latter publishing a collection of over 30,000 Polish proverbs (Księga przysłów, przypowieści i wyrażeń przysłowiowych polskich - The Book of Polish Proverbs - 1889–1894). Adalberg's work was praised as "the first modern work on this topic in Polish" and "the most extensive collection ever made in this field". The early 20th century saw further scholarly analysis of Polish proverbs by scholars such as Aleksander Brückner and Jan Stanisław Bystroń, the latter known as "the father of modern Polish paremiology", and the author of the monograph simply titled Przysłowia polskie (Polish proverbs, 1933). After World War II, significant contributions to the field of Polish paremiology were carried out by Julian Krzyżanowski. He was the editor of the largest and most reputable collection of Polish proverbs to date, Nowa księga przysłów i wyrażeń przysłowiowych polskich (New Book of Polish Proverbs and Proverbial Expressions, also known as Nowa Księga przysłów polskich, A New Book of Polish Proverbs, published in several volumes in the years 1969–1978), dubbed the "bible of Polish proverbs". Despite the proliferation of similar works in later years, in 2012 his work was still described as "the most comprehensive" of its type in Poland. Other notable modern Polish paremiologists include Tomasz Jurasz, Dobrosława Świerczyńska, Katarzyna Kłosińska, Jerzy Bralczyk and Władysław Kopaliński.

In 2009–2018 alone, 16 collections of proverbs aimed at young readers were published in Poland; many addressed to a mass audience are of varying quality.

== List of Polish proverbs ==
- Heaven for the nobility, purgatory for townspeople, hell for peasants, paradise for Jews
- Pole and Hungarian brothers be

== See also ==
- wikiquote:Polish proverbs
- List of proverbial phrases (used in English)
- Chinese proverbs
- Japanese proverbs
- Korean proverbs
- Polish joke
- Russian proverbs
- Spanish proverbs
