= Birds of a feather flock together =

English proverb

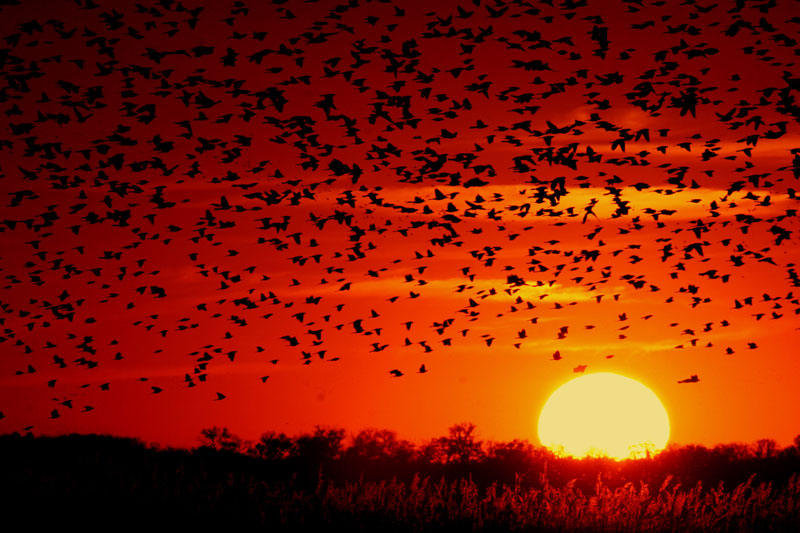
Birds "of a feather" (in this case red-winged blackbirds) exhibiting flocking behavior, the source of the idiom

Birds of a feather flock together is an English proverb. The meaning is that beings (typically humans) of similar type, interest, personality, character, or other distinctive attribute tend to mutually associate.

The first known written instance of metaphorical use of the flocking behavior of birds is found in the second century BC, where Ben Sira uses it in his apocryphal Biblical Book of Sirach, written about 180–175 BC. This was translated into Greek sometime after 117 BC (probably), and it is this Greek version that has commonly been used, even in the Septuagint used by diaspora Jews. Although the Book of Sirach is not included in the Hebrew Bible, and therefore not considered scripture in Judaism, it is included in the Septuagint and the Old Testament of the Catholic and Orthodox churches. In the Protestant traditions, historically, and still in continuation today in Lutheranism and Anglicanism, the Book of Sirach is an intertestamental text found in the Apocrypha, though it is regarded as noncanonical. Richard Challoner's 1752 version of the Douay–Rheims Bible translates this phrase in Sirach as

Birds resort unto their like: so truth will return to them that practise her.

The idiom is sometimes spoken or written as an anapodoton, where only the first part ("Birds of a feather") is given and the second part ("...flock together") is implied, as, for example "The whole lot of them are thick as thieves; well, birds of a feather, you know" (this requires the reader or listener to be familiar with the idiom).

== Sources ==
In nature, birds of the same species in flight often form homogeneous groups for various reasons, such as to defend against predators. This behavior of birds has been observed by people since time immemorial, and is the source of the idiom ("of a feather" means "of the same plumage," that is, of the same species).

== In early literature ==
The first known written instance of metaphorical use of the flocking behavior of birds is found in the second century BC, where Ben Sira uses it in his apocryphal Biblical Book of Sirach, written about 180–175 BC. This was translated into Greek sometime after 117 BC (probably), and it is this Greek version that has commonly been used, even in the Septuagint used by diaspora Jews.

Verse 27:9 of this Greek version of Sira's Hebrew original is

πετεινὰ πρὸς τὰ ὅμοια αὐτοῖς καταλύσει, καὶ ἀλήθεια πρὸς τοὺς ἐργαζομένους αὐτὴν ἐπανήξει.

Richard Challoner's 1752 version of the Douay–Rheims Bible translates this as

Birds resort unto their like: so truth will return to them that practise her.

Other renderings give "Birds roost with their own kind, so honesty comes home to those who practice it" (New Revised Standard Version Catholic Edition, 1989), "Birds nest with their own kind, and honesty comes to those who work at it" (New American Bible Revised Edition, 2011), and so forth.

== In English literature ==
The first known use of the idiom in original English writing is 1545, when William Turner used a version of it in his anti-Catholic satire "The Rescuing of the Papist Fox":

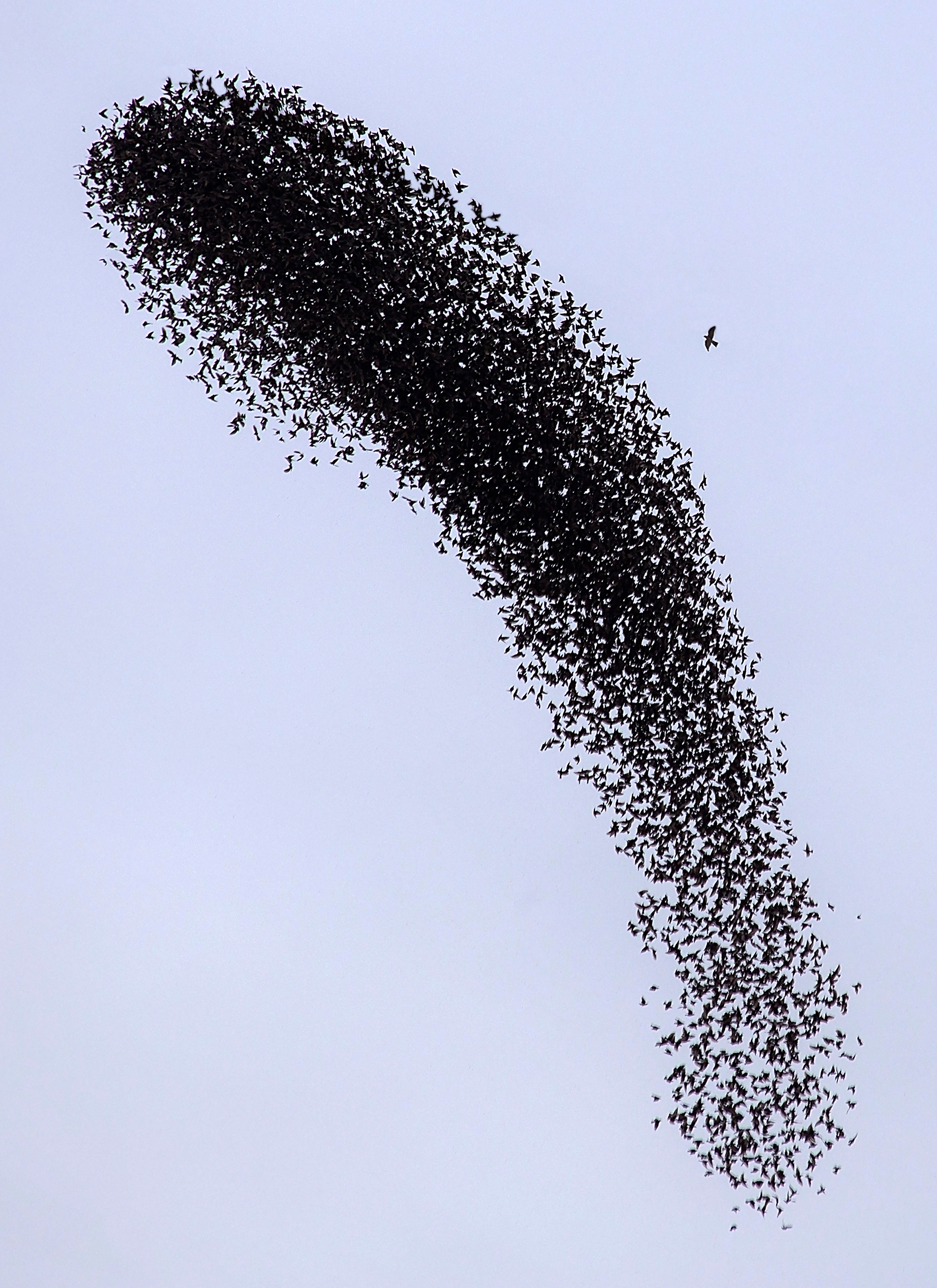
"sterlynges... aferde of the hauk" flock and maneuver to thwart a bird of prey (to right of flock)

It is easy to know the cawse for as byrdes of on kynde and color flok and flye allwayes together / so the papistes will euer be to gether / that on may euer help another / not only with numbre as sterlynges do when they ar aferde of the hauk / but also to consult & take counsel together how theyr sect myght be best promoted manteyned & set forward

Which may be rendered in 21st century English as

It is simple to know the cause, for just as birds of one kind and color always flock and fly together, so the Papists [NB: a pejorative name for Catholics] will always be together, that they may help each other – not only with sheer numbers as starlings do when threatened by a hawk, but also to consult and plan together as to how their religion may be best maintained, promoted, and popularized.

John Minsheu's The Dictionarie in Spanish and English (1599) has "Birdes of a feather will flocke togither". Philemon Holland's 1600 translation of Livy's Ab Urbe Condita Libri has "As commonly birds of a feather will flye together", while Dryden's 1697 translation The Works of Virgil: Containing His Pastorals, Georgics, and Aeneis ascribes flocking behavior to humans: "What place the gods for our repose assigned / Friends daily flock..."

Benjamin Jowett's translation of Plato's 360 BC Republic, published in 1856 and in use since, has "Men of my age flock together; we are birds of a feather, as the old proverb says".

Plato's original is:

Ἐγώ σοι, ἔφη, νὴ τὸν Δία ἐρῶ, ὦ Σώκρατες, οἷόν γέ μοι φαίνεται. πολλάκις γὰρ συνερχόμεθά τινες εἰς ταὐτὸν παραπλησίαν ἡλικίαν ἔχοντες, διασῴζοντες τὴν παλαιὰν παροιμίαν·

Jowett gives this as:

I will tell you, Socrates, he said, what my own feeling is. Men of my age flock together; we are birds of a feather, as the old proverb says.

However, Jowett here is taking a liberty in rendering Plato's phrase into idiomatic English of his time; the Greek original has nothing about birds, and it is not known what "old proverb" is referred to. But as Jowett was long the standard translation (and is still sometimes used), generations of students learned (wrongly) that the idiom was current in classical Athens. Later translations dispense with the bird reference, hewing more closely to the original text; Allan Bloom's 1968 translation of the passage, for instance has "By Zeus, I shall tell you just how it looks to me, Socrates, he said. Some of us who are about the same age often meet together and keep up the old proverb."

But Jowett's translation work was retained in other works in his time and after and his translation of Plato was considered as the right one for about a century and is still used, putting the proverb in the mouth of a character (Cephalus) to be read by generations of students and scholars.

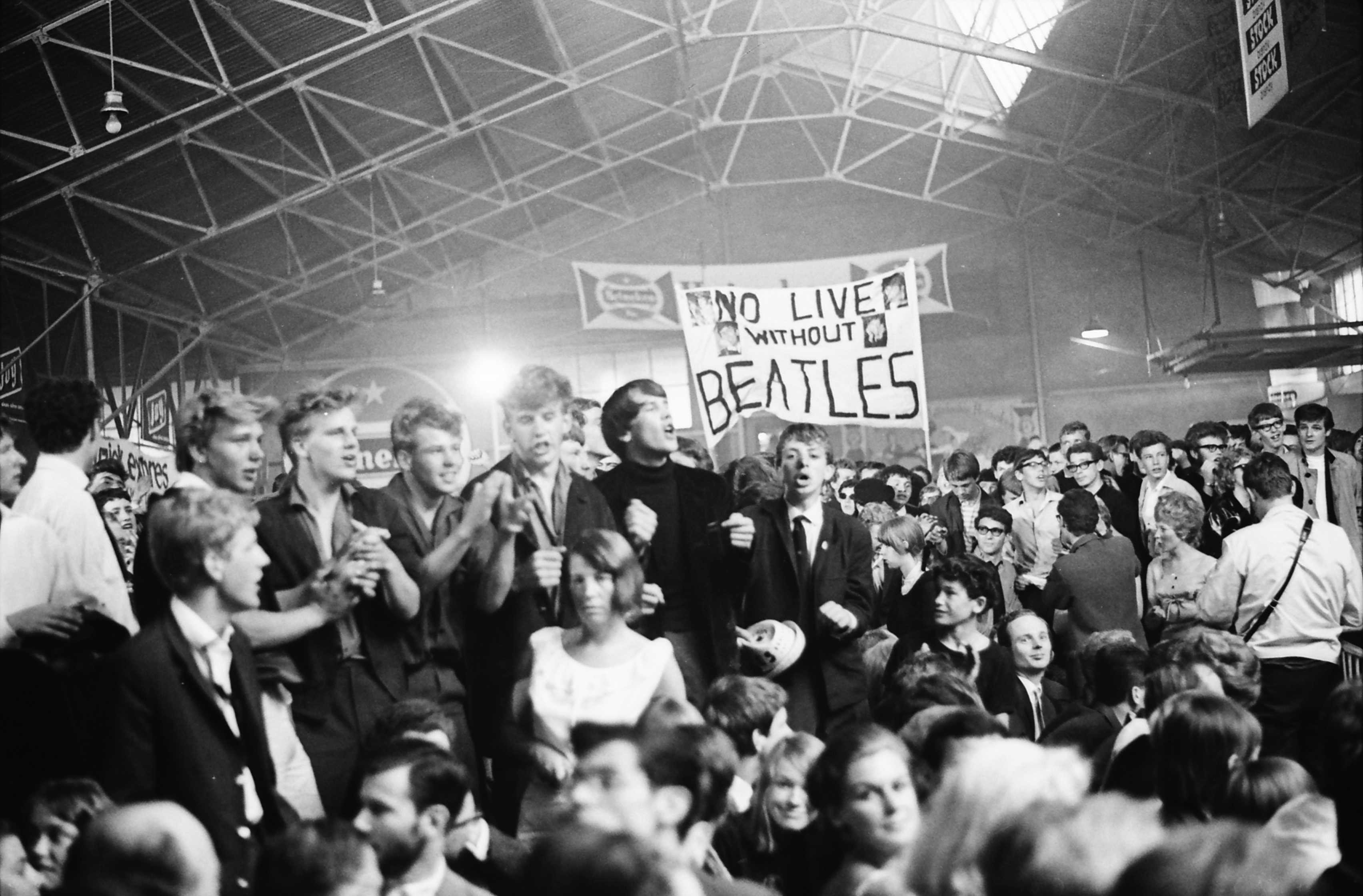
A group of people sharing a similar interest (in this case, Beatles fans) figuratively "flocking". (The idiom often refers to a metaphorical "flocking" and does not necessarily refer to people being, as here, in actual physical proximity.)

The idiom appears occasionally in the literary canon, both in English and translations from other languages.

Swift's poem "A Conference, Between Sir Harry Pierce's Chariot, And Mrs. D. Stopford's Chair" (c. 1710) has "And since we're so near, like birds of a feather / Let's e'en, as they say, set our horses together", while Anthony Trollope in The Prime Minister (1876) has "'They're birds of a feather,' said Lopez. 'Birds of a feather do fall out sometimes'...", and James Joyce in Ulysses (1922) has "I have more than once observed that birds of a feather laugh together." Tolstoy's War and Peace (1869, first translated into English in 1899) has "...so that birds of a feather may fight together" (that is, on the same side). (A Russian proverb with similar meaning is одного поля ягоды ("berries from the same field")

== Translation from other languages ==
Many cultures have similar sayings which, although not necessarily mentioning birds, may be idiomatically translated as "birds of a feather flock together".

- Chinese: a form similar to anapodoton, called xiehouyu ("a saying with the latter part suspended"), is a folk tradition. One xiehouyu of similar meaning to "birds of a feather...", and which may be idiomatically translated as that, is 物以類聚, "Similar things collect...", where the second part (人以群分, "...similar people also") is left unsaid and implied.
- Finnish: "vakka kantensa valitsee" (bushel will choose its lid) is an idiom with a similar meaning and it's also sometimes used as a local alternative to the English "birds of a feather flock together".
- French: "Qui se ressemble, s'assemble", literally "who looks alike, assembles" is a common saying.
- German: a similar proverb exists and it can be translated with "same and same like to join each other" ("Gleich und Gleich gesellt sich gern"). It does not rhyme, but has an alliteration.
- Hebrew: "הלך הזרזיר אצל העורב" (the starling went together with the crow), also sometimes used as an anapodoton, e.g. "הלך הזרזיר..." (went the starling... [you know where]). The expression mostly carries a negative tone, meaning both starling and crow are complicit in their bad behavior, presumably because of the crow's bad behavior towards people and the starling's resemblance to it, or that both birds are unclean animals. The original Mishnaic Hebrew proverb is "לא לחינם הלך זרזיר אצל עורב, אלא מפני שהוא מינו" (Not for nothing went a starling with a crow, but because it is its kind) (Hullin 65, A).
- Italian: a similar proverb exists which consists of "chi si somiglia si piglia", and which can be translated as "who resembles each other takes the other".
- Japanese: a similar proverb is 目の寄る所へ玉が寄る, literally "where the eyes go, the eyeballs follow" but with an understood idiomatic meaning of "like draws like", which can be translated into idiomatic English as "birds of a feather flock together", as may the Japanese saying 類は友を呼ぶ, "similar calls a friend."
- Persian: "کبوتر با کبوتر، باز با باز، کند همجنس با همجنس پرواز", literally "dove with dove, hawk with hawk, homogeneous birds fly together" is a similar proverb.
- Swedish: "lika barn leka bäst" ("children that are alike play the best [together]") is also sometimes translated into idiomatic English as "birds of a feather flock together."
- Arabic: "الطيور على اشكالها تقع" has roughly the same meaning
- Urdu: a similar idiom is چور کا بھائی گَٹھی چور (Chor ka bhai gathi chor), which translates to "the thief's brother is also a thief," highlighting that individuals with similar negative traits tend to associate. Variations of this idiom include: چور کا بھائی گٹھ کترا (Chor ka bhai gath katra), چور کا بھائی گِرَہ کَٹ (Chor ka bhai girah kat), چور کا بھائی گَٹھ کٹا (Chor ka bhai gath kata). These versions emphasize association among individuals of similar character.
