= Russian proverbs =

Oral texts in Russian

Russian proverbs originated in oral history and written texts dating as far back as the 12th century. The Russian language is replete with many hundreds of proverbs (пословица [pɐˈslovʲɪtsə]) and sayings (поговорка [pəɡɐˈvorkə]). The proverbs express a universal concept, have a moral lesson and provide an insight into many aspects of history, culture, and national character of the people who created them. By the 17th century, the proverbs were collected and documented. They were studied in the 19th and 20th centuries. Vladimir Dal was a famous lexicographer of the Russian Empire whose collection was published in Russian language in the late 19th century as The Sayings and Bywords of the Russian People, featuring more than 30,000 entries. They continue to endure in modern literature and folklore. Evidence of this is seen in the collection of Russian anti-proverbs collected by Reznikov.

== See also ==
- List of Russian proverbs (Wikiquote)
- List of Russian proverbs (Wiktionary)
- Vladimir Dal
- Chinese proverbs
- Japanese proverbs
- Korean proverbs
- Polish proverbs
- Spanish proverbs

== Bibliography ==
- Anikin, V. P. Russian proverbs and sayings. Khudozhestvennaya Literatura, Moscow (1988).
- Dal, Vladimir I. Proverbs of Russian People. М.: Russian Book (1993).
- Danko, S. G., et al. "Comparison of the effects of the subjective complexity and verbal creativity on EEG spectral power parameters." Human Physiology 35.3 (2009): 381-383. link to article
- Gibian, George. How Russian Proverbs Present the Russian National Character. Russianness: Studies on a Nation’s Identity. Ed. Robert L. Belknap. Ann Arbor (1990): 38-43.
- Gluski, Jerzy. Proverbs: A Comparative Book of English, French, German, Italian, Spanish, and Russian Proverbs with a Latin Appendix. Elsevier Science Limited, 1989.
- Guershoon, Andrew. Certain aspects of Russian proverbs. F. Muller ltd., 1941.
- Krylov. C. A. Russian Proverbs and Sayings in Russian and English. US Army Russian Institute, 1973.
- Langna, I. A. 1200 Russian proverbs. Philosophical Library, 1960.
- Mertvago, Peter. The comparative Russian-English dictionary of Russian proverbs & sayings: with 5543 entries: 1900 most important proverbs highlighted: English proverb index. Hippocrene Books, 1995.
- Permiakov, Grigoriĭ Lʹvovich. From proverb to Folk-tale: Notes on the general theory of cliche. Nauka, 1979.
- Politis, Vera, Richard Robert Sheldon, and Alan A. Reich, eds. Russian Proverbs: 100 Favorites of Professor Nadezhda Timofeevna Koroton. Dartmouth Triad Associates, 1998.
