= When have we eaten from the same dish? =

Spanish idiom

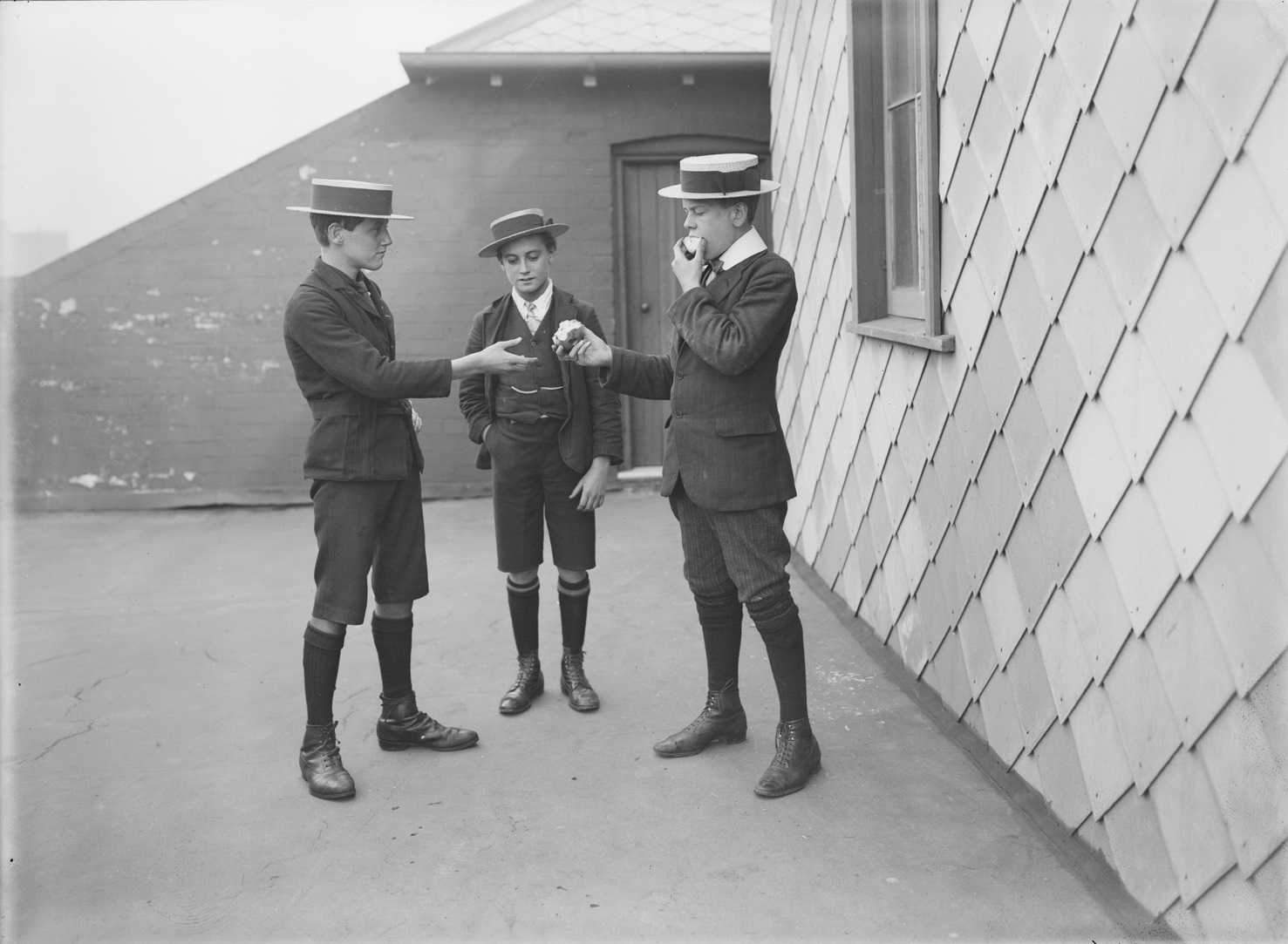
Boys eating from the same piece of fruit

"When have we eaten from the same dish?" (Spanish: ¿Cuándo hemos comido en el mismo plato?) is a Spanish idiom said to someone who has caused irritation or offense by acting too informally. It is usually made as hierarchical social commentary about poor manners or incivility, said to someone perceived to be acting above their social standing, position, class or rank.

== Background ==
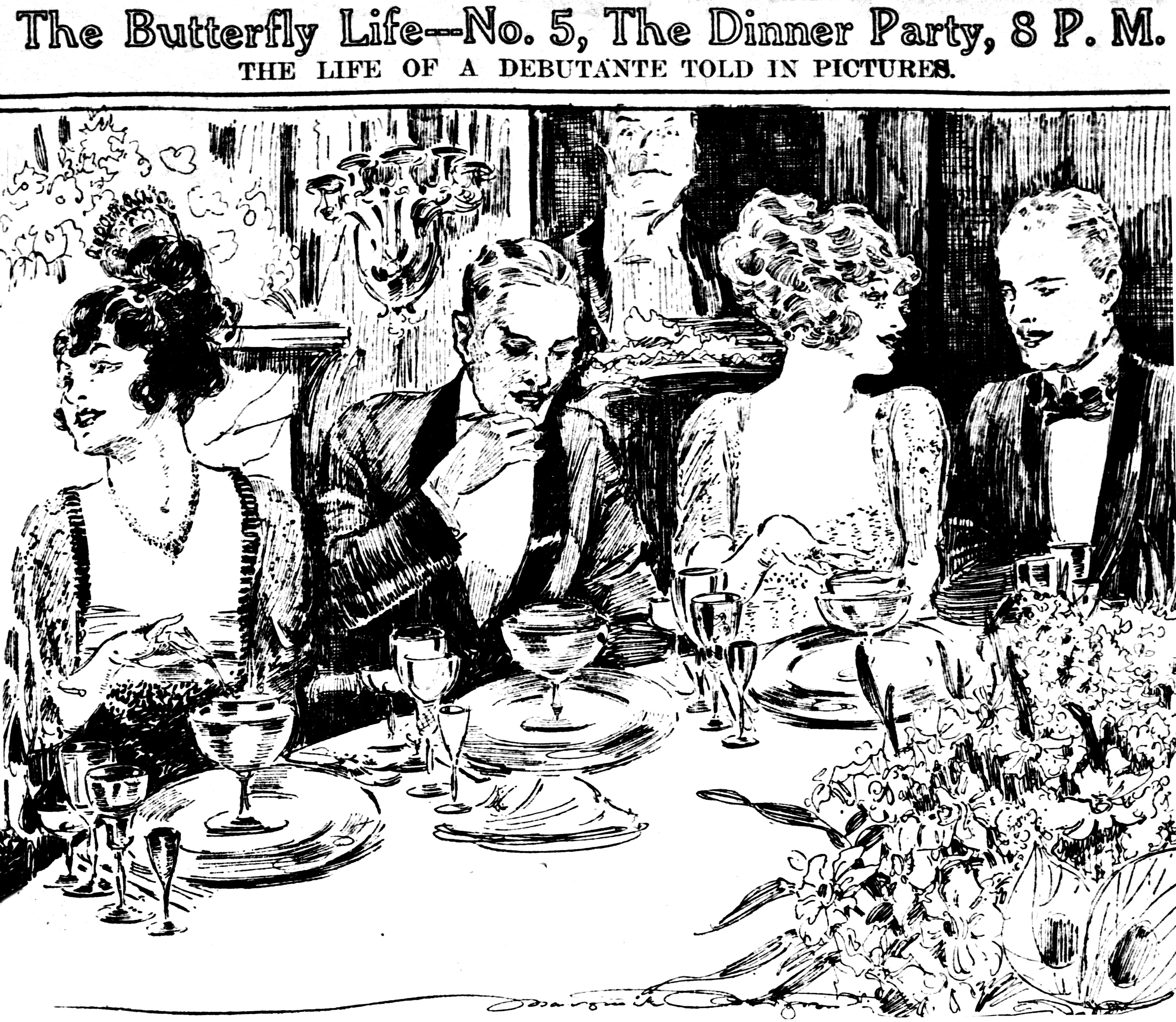
Place settings are conspicuous in this 1920 sketch by reporter-artist Marguerite Martyn of the St. Louis Post-Dispatch.

According to José María Sbarbi, in his dictionary of proverbs, the saying comes from a great lord who organized a feast. At the table, the place makers required that each lady had a gentleman by her side. For each couple there was only one dish, a single glass and a single knife, even though the couples were strangers. The talent of the host was to place the guests in such a way that the familiarity between them was pleasing to both.

Human social relationships and rituals are built upon food and its consumption. Traditionally, sharing food has suggested a level of intimacy between the people sharing the meal. The expression is used as a cutting remark; when asking if two people are eating from the same plate, what one is really saying is, "are we on such familiar terms that you can treat me with disrespect?"

In many countries, family and friends often ate from a communal bowl. With that came a whole set of customs and expectations. Shared food is one of the most intimate and generous acts. People sit to eat with their family and friends, and to celebrate special occasions.

== Variants ==
Similar phrases are used in various languages.

- German: Ich kann mich nicht erinnern, dass wir schon mal zusammen Schweine gehütet haben. (I don't recall us having kept pigs together before.)
- French: Nous n'avons pas gardé les cochons ensembles. (We have not kept pigs together.)

== See also ==
- Paremiology
- Spanish proverbs
- Honour thy father and thy mother
- Kids' table
- Don't get above your raisin'
