= A picture is worth a thousand words =

Adage

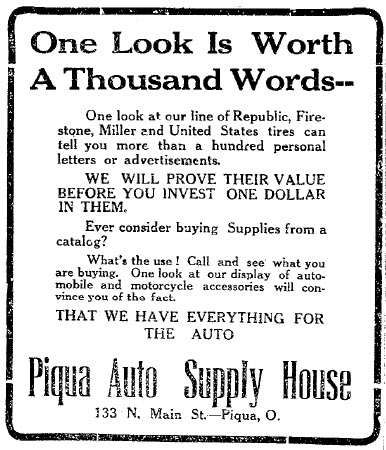
- 1913 newspaper advertisement
- Original form: "Use a picture. It's worth a thousand words."
- Coined by: Arthur Brisbane
- Meaning: Seeing something is better for learning than having it described

"A picture is worth a thousand words" is an adage in multiple languages meaning that complex and sometimes multiple ideas can be conveyed by a single still image, which conveys its meaning or essence more effectively than a mere verbal description.

== History ==
In March 1911, the Syracuse Advertising Men's Club held a banquet to discuss journalism and publicity. This was reported in two articles. In an article in The Post-Standard covering this event, the author quoted Arthur Brisbane as saying: "Use a picture. It's worth a thousand words." In an article in Printers' Ink, the same quote is attributed to Brisbane.

A similar phrase, "One Look Is Worth A Thousand Words", appears in a 1913 newspaper advertisement for the Piqua Auto Supply House of Piqua, Ohio.

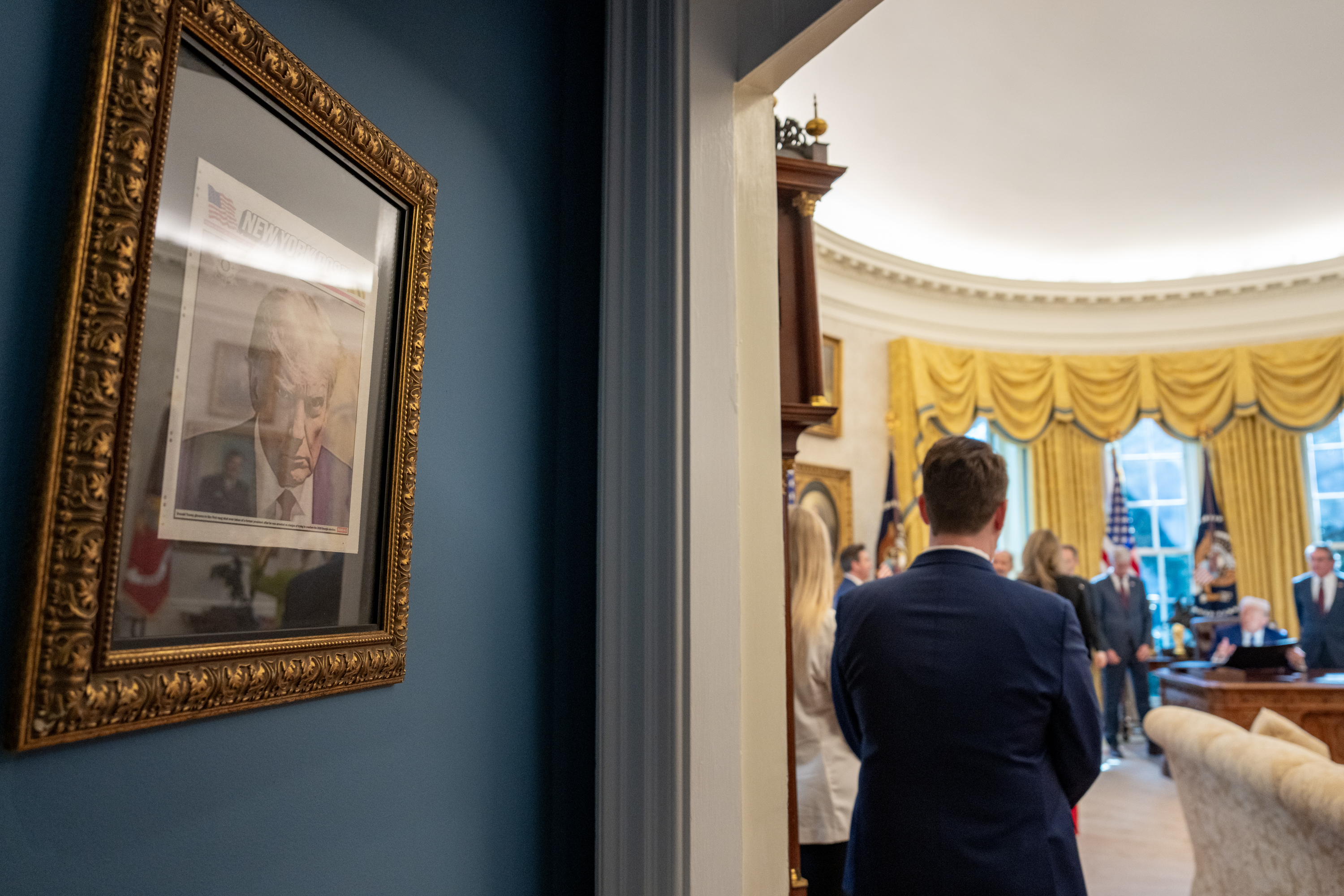
The New York Post reported on Donald Trump's mugshot by printing it on most of the page with no headline and only a small caption. The edition is framed and displayed in the White House by Trump as seen here.

Early use of the exact phrase appears in a 1918 newspaper advertisement for the San Antonio Light, which says:

One of the Nation's Greatest Editors Says:

One Picture is Worth a Thousand Words
The San Antonio Light's Pictorial Magazine of the War
Exemplifies the truth of the above statement—judging from the warm

reception it has received at the hands of the Sunday Light readers.

The modern use of the phrase is generally attributed to Fred R. Barnard. Barnard wrote this phrase in the advertising trade journal Printers' Ink, promoting the use of images in advertisements that appeared on the sides of streetcars. The December 8, 1921, issue carries an ad entitled, "One Look is Worth A Thousand Words." Another ad by Barnard appears in the March 10, 1927, issue with the phrase "One Picture Worth Ten Thousand Words", where it is labeled a Chinese proverb. The 1949 Home Book of Proverbs, Maxims, and Familiar Phrases quotes Barnard as saying he called it "a Chinese proverb, so that people would take it seriously." Nonetheless, the proverb soon after became popularly attributed to Confucius. The actual Chinese expression "Hearing something a hundred times isn't better than seeing it once" (百闻不如一见, p bǎi wén bù rú yī jiàn) is sometimes introduced as an equivalent, as Watts's "One showing is worth a hundred sayings". This was published as early as 1966 discussing persuasion and selling in a book on engineering design.

== Equivalents ==
Despite this modern origin of the popular phrase, the sentiment has been expressed by earlier writers. For example, Leonardo da Vinci wrote that a poet would be "overcome by sleep and hunger before [being able to] describe with words what a painter is able to [depict] in an instant." The Russian writer Ivan Turgenev wrote in 1861, "The drawing shows me at one glance what might be spread over ten pages in a book." The quote is sometimes attributed to Napoleon Bonaparte, who said "A good sketch is better than a long speech" (French: Un bon croquis vaut mieux qu'un long discours). This is sometimes translated today as "A picture is worth a thousand words."

== Similar phrases ==
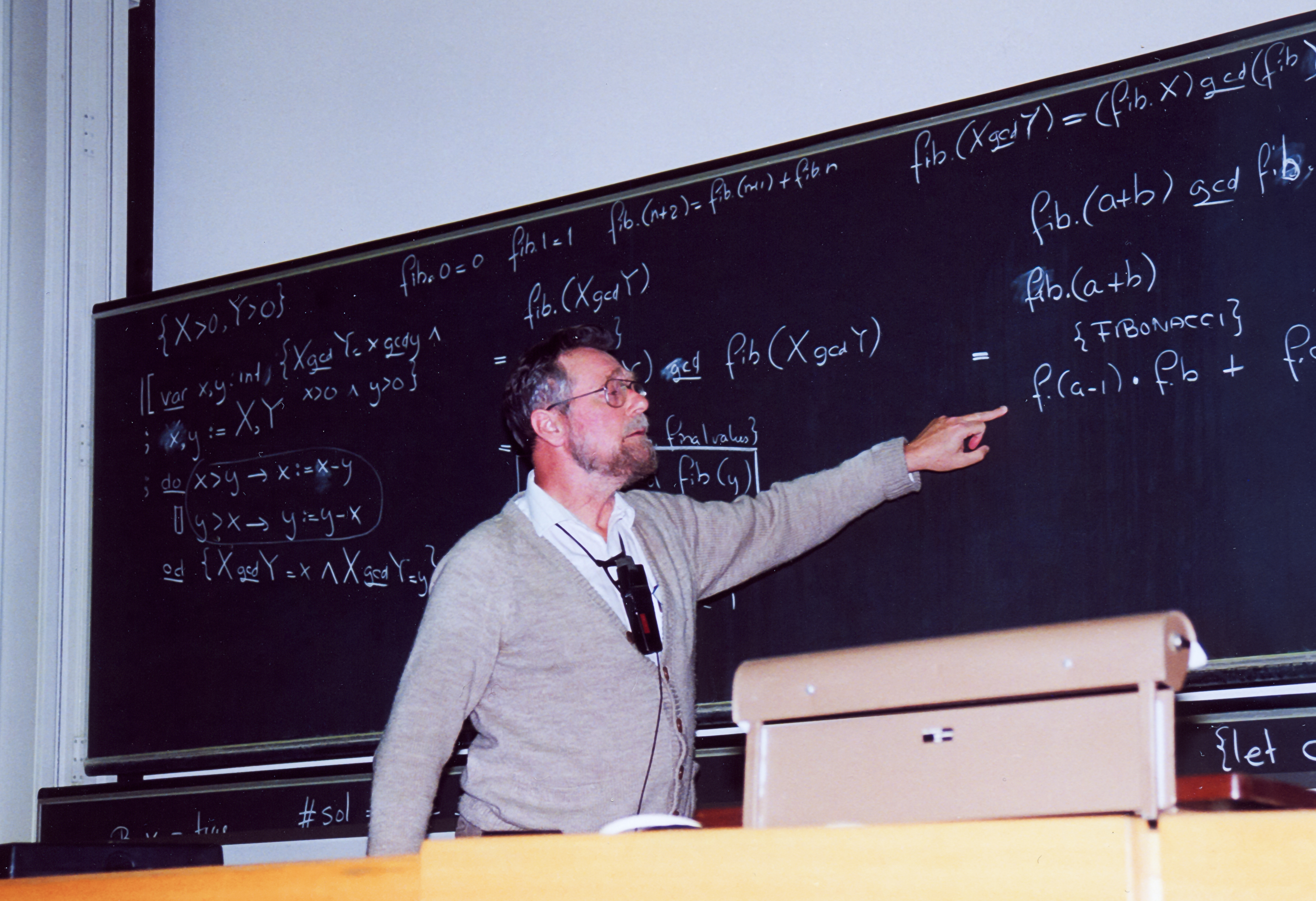
Edsger Dijkstra at the blackboard during a conference at ETH Zurich in 1994. In Dijkstra's own words, "A picture may be worth a thousand words, a formula is worth a thousand pictures."

=== A scientific formula is worth a thousand pictures ===
Computer scientist Edsger Dijkstra once remarked, "A picture may be worth a thousand words, a formula is worth a thousand pictures."

=== Spoof ===
The phrase has been spoofed by computer scientist John McCarthy, to make the opposite point: "As the Chinese say, 1001 words is worth more than a picture."

This phrase has also been spoofed from N.A.N.A.E by Captain Gym Z. Quirk, a regular poster, who stated "A picture may be worth a thousand words, but consumes the bandwidth of two thousand" in reference to an observation of file sizes at the time. circa the late 1990's early 2000's. That difference in bandwidth has only increased as digital pictures have become of higher resolution with larger file size.

== See also ==
- The Commissar Vanishes
- Ekphrasis
- Picture superiority effect
