= Samuel Adalberg =

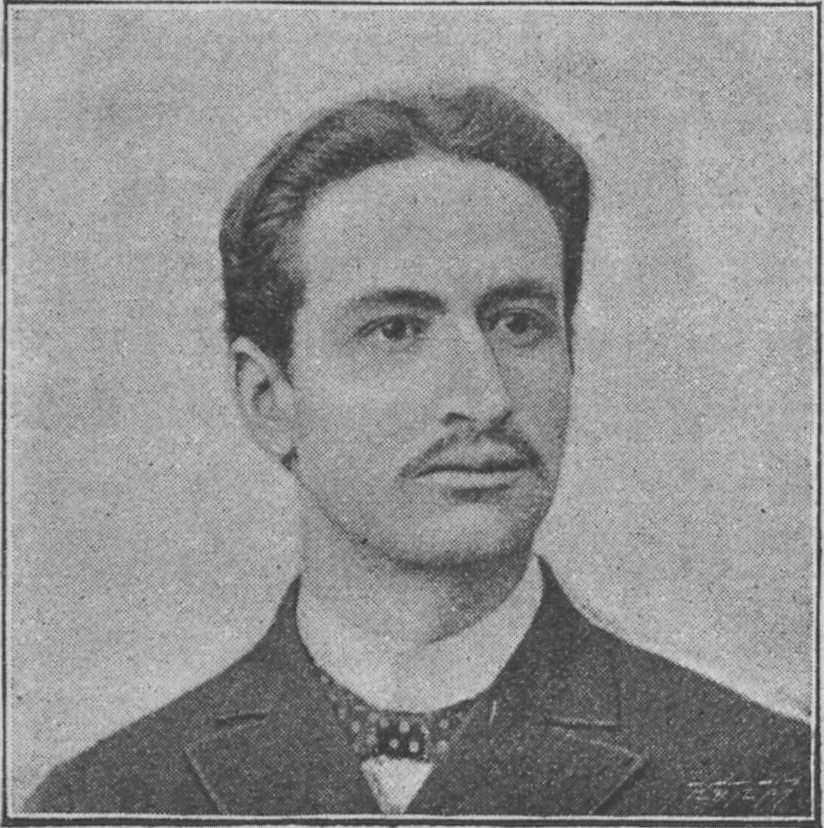
Samuel Adalberg

Samuel Adalberg (1868 – 10 November 1939) was a Polish historian of folklore, literature, a paremiologist and a state official. He is remembered for editing and publishing the first modern book on Polish proverbs.

== Biography ==
Cover of his collection of Jewish proverbs in Polish

Born in Warsaw in 1868, in the years 1878–1888 he attended the Szkoła Realna of Samuel Dickstein. At that time he befriended Samuel Abraham Poznański. He was also employed by Ignacy Bernstein, an entrepreneur, philanthropist, and paremiologist, to organize his library. At that time he translated and published anonymously two collections of Yiddish proverbs (in 1888 and 1890), and published, under his own name, a book on Polish proverbs, Księga przysłów polskich (The Book of Polish Proverbs; 1889–1894) called "the first modern work on this topic in Polish" and " the most extensive collection ever made in this field". He was also involved in the release of an annotated editions of older Polish literary works, published by the Polish Academy of Arts and Sciences. From 1898 he was a member of the Commission on Philology of the Polish Academy of Arts and Sciences in recognition of his work on the study of proverbs. He was also involved with the Society for the Promotion of Culture among the Jews of Russia (as at that time eastern Poland, where he lived, was part of the Russian partition of Poland).

Unable to sustain himself from just his academic interests, around the turn of the century he also worked at Hipolit Wawelberg's bank. Later he became involved with the Hipolit Wawelberg Foundation and the Society for Educating the Jews (Towarzystwo Szerzenia Oświaty Wśród Żydów).

Following the end of World War I and the restoration of Polish independence, in the Second Polish Republic he joined the Polish Regency Council and became its top official for the Jewish affairs. Later, until 1930, he worked in various capacities in the department for Jewish affairs in the Polish Ministry of Religions and Public Education, eventually becoming its director. He was involved in issues such as the legal status of Jewish religious communities. He was also involved in the creation of the State School for Teachers of the Jewish Faith (Państwowe Seminarium dla Nauczycieli Religii Mojżeszowej w Warszawie), the Institute for Jewish Studies, and the Main Judaic Library in Warsaw. During his time in the government he has attracted criticism of the Agudath Israel activists, who accused him of favoring the Zionists. After his retirement, he was the Warsaw representative of the Gesellschaft für die Wissenschaft des Judentums (Society for Judaic Sciences).

Following the German invasion of Poland in September 1939, and hearing about the German plans for the creation of the Warsaw Ghetto, he committed suicide on 10 November.

Polish historian of literature, Julian Krzyżanowski, called him, "a pioneer of the modern study Polish paremiology."
