= Spanish proverbs =

Phrases in the Spanish language

Spanish proverbs are a subset of proverbs that are used in Western cultures in general; there are many that have essentially the same form and content as their counterparts in other Western languages. Proverbs that have their origin in Spanish have migrated to and from English, French, Flemish, German and other languages.

== Origins ==
Many Spanish proverbs have a long history of cultural diffusion; there are proverbs, for example, that have their origin traced to Ancient Babylon and that have been transmitted culturally to Spain during the period of classical antiquity; equivalents of the Spanish proverb “En boca cerrada no entran moscas” (Silence is golden, literally "Flies cannot enter a closed mouth") belong to the cultural tradition of many African countries such as Ethiopia; having gone through multiple languages and millennia, this proverb can be traced back to an ancient Babylonian proverb.

The written evidence of the use of Spanish proverbs goes far back in Spanish literature. El Cantar de Mio Cid, written at the end of the 11th or the beginning of the 12th century, is the first instance. Examples of other early works that use Spanish proverbs are the Libro de Buen Amor by Juan Ruiz in the 14th century and El Corbacho by Alfonso Martínez de Toledo in the 15th century. The first anthology of Spanish proverbs, Proverbios que dicen las viejas tras el fuego, was written by Íñigo López de Mendoza, 1st Marquis of Santillana in the 15th century. Also in the 15th century was written the Seniloquium, an erudite and anonymous work containing a compendium of Spanish sayings and proverbs with commentaries. The language of the characters in Fernando de Rojas’ La Celestina (15th – 16th century) is enlivened with the use of proverbs.

Then, of course, in the 17th century there is the renowned book Don Quixote by novelist Miguel de Cervantes. Sancho Panza, Cervantes’ earthy character, is the essential common man. His thinking habitually relies on the authority he vests in the wealth of popular cultural wisdom expressed in proverbs, which he continually quotes. In contrast, his master Don Quixote draws his references from chivalric romance books and is surprised that Sancho can find suitable proverbs for every circumstance. Don Quixote includes many Spanish proverbs. There are Spanish proverbs that contradict others; the “wisdom” that they encapsulate is not, of course, absolute. People will use those proverbs that best conform to their own particular way of approaching life. Taken together, however, they reveal the deep wellsprings of Spanish culture and of human nature in general.

== Examples ==
- Al buen callar llaman Sancho

Literal translation:

He who keeps well silent they call Sancho

Meaning/use:

Don't speak if it would be foolish to do so

Comments:

Philologist José María Sbarbi y Osuna claims that this proverb refers to eleventh century King Sancho II of Castile and León, who is said to have kept silent when his dying father King Ferdinand divided up his kingdom between his three sons. After his father's death Sancho dispossessed his brothers to re-establish a single kingdom.

An alternative theory is that Sancho may be a mis-hearing of the word santo (saint), which could lead to the interpretation that keeping quiet at the appropriate time is a saintly thing to do.

- Cada buhonero alaba sus agujas (archaic).

Literal translation:

Every peddler praises his needles

Meanings/uses:

Every vendor wishes to convince potential buyers that their goods are excellent.
This is used in a broader sense to allude to a tendency for people to exaggerate when describing their own virtues. Can be used to criticize someone who thinks too highly of themselves.

- Cada gallo canta en su muladar.

Literal translation:

Each rooster sings on its dung-heap.

Meanings/uses:

Each person rules in his own house or territory.
A person manifests his true nature when surrounded by family or close friends, when in his own ambience and in his place of origin.

- Cada martes tiene su domingo.

Literal translation:

Each Tuesday has its Sunday.

Meaning/Use:

Similar to English 'every cloud has a silver lining'.

Comments:

Tuesday is a weekday of hard work, long before Sunday, the day of rest.

- Cada uno habla de la feria como le va en ella.

Literal translation:

Each person talks about the fair according to how they experience it.

Meaning/use:

Our views reflects our own experience.

- Dime con quien andas y te diré quién eres.

Literal translation:

Tell me who you walk with, and I will tell you who you are.

Meaning/use:

'Birds of a feather flock together'. The company you keep reflects your character.

- Donde comen dos, comen tres.

Literal translation:

Wherever two people eat, three people eat.

Meaning/use:

You can add one person more in any situation you are managing.

- El amor es ciego.

Literal translation:

Love is blind

Meaning/use:

Love makes us blind to the defects and failings of our beloved.

- El amor todo lo iguala.

Literal translation:

Love makes everything equal.

Meaning/use:

Love overcomes differences, hardships and barriers.

- El mejor escribano echa un borrón.

Literal translation:

The best scribe makes a blot.

Meaning/use:

Even the best make mistakes. Don't let errors demotivate you.

- El tiempo todo lo cura.

Literal translation:

Time cures all.

Meaning/use:

Time is a great healer.

- Estar como el alma de Garibay.

Literal translation:

To be like Garibay's soul

Meaning/use:

To waver or vacillate.

Origin/Comments:

19th century Spanish historian José María Sbarbi y Osuna claims that the phrase refers to 16th century Basque writer Esteban de Garibay whose soul was believed trapped between heaven and hell after his death, according to inhabitants of his home town, leading to ghostly voices in his house at night.

- La avaricia rompe el saco.

Literal meaning:

Greed bursts the sack.

Meaning/use:

Greed and excessive ambition can stand in the way of obtaining benefit or success.

Comments:

This Spanish proverb evokes the image of a thief using a sack to carry the objects they steal. When the sack fills up, they press down its contents to make more fit in, making it break and losing their whole loot.

- La cara es el espejo del alma.

Literal translation:

The face is the mirror of the soul.

Meaning/use:

Our face reflects our state of health, our character, and our mood.

Origin:

Cicero (106-43 BC): 'Ut imago est animi voltus sic indices oculi' (English: The face is a picture of the mind as the eyes are its interpreter)

- La diligencia es la madre de la buena ventura.

Literal translation:

Diligence is the mother of good fortune.

Meaning/use:

One must be active and diligent in order to achieve one's goals.

- La fe mueve montañas.

Literal translation:

Faith moves mountains.

Meaning/use:

Praises the power of the confidence that faith endows us with.

- La mejor palabra siempre es la que queda por decir.

Literal translation:

The best word is the one left unsaid.

Meaning/use:

Sings the praises of prudence in talk.

- La peor gallina es la que más cacarea.

Literal translation:

The worst hen is the one that clucks the most.

Meaning/use:

It is not rare to see a person boasting and wishing to stand out even though his merits are few and his qualities inadequate.

- La sangre sin fuego hierve.

Literal translation:

Blood boils without fire.

Meaning/use:

Comments on the strength of blood bonds.

- La suerte está echada.

English equivalent:

The die is cast.

Meaning/use:

Said in the face of a threatening situation the outcome of which one is unable to prevent.

Origin/Comments:

Julius Caesar is reputed to have said Alea iacta est after having crossed the Rubicon river with his legions.

- La vida no es un camino de rosas.

Near literal translation and English equivalent:

Life is not a path of roses.

Meaning/use:

It's normal to encounter all kinds of difficulties along the road of life.

- Las burlas se vuelven veras.

Literal translation:

Bad jokes become reality.

Meaning/use:

One should be careful when joking to avoid being hurting or offensive. Burlas and veras when used in relationship with one another, the first means “jokingly” and the second “really”.

- Las desgracias nunca vienen solas.

Literal translation:

Misfortunes never come one at a time.

Meaning/uses:

Said when several annoyances or setbacks occur at the same time or follow closely one another.

English equivalents:

When it rains, it pours.
It never rains but it pours.

Similar Spanish proverb:

Un mal llama a otro.

- Lo comido es lo seguro.

Literal translation:

You can only be really certain of what is already in your belly.

Meaning/use:

When confronted with a choice between something certain and something uncertain, this Spanish proverb is used to gravitate towards the first.

- Los años no pasan en balde.

Literal translation:

Years don't pass in vain.

Meaning/use:

Resign oneself to the ravages of time, particularly illness and old age.

English equivalent:

Years take their toll.

- Los árboles no dejan ver el bosque.

English equivalent:

One can't see the forest for the trees.

Meaning/use:

Attention to detail can make one lose perspective.

- Los celos son malos consejeros.

Literal translation:

Jealousy is a bad counsellor.

Meaning/use:

Jealousy does not lead to sensible behaviour.

- Los tiempos cambian.

Literal translation:

Times change.

Meaning/use:

Exhorts to adapt to changing circumstances and not indulge in lamentations and useless comparisons.

- Mañana será otro día.

Literal translation:

Tomorrow will be another day.

Meaning/use:

Recommends to let matters rest and leave for another day and a clearer head the search for a solution to a problem or situation.

Variation:

Mañana será otro día, y verá el tuerto los espárragos.

- Nadie está contento con su suerte.

Literal translation:

No one is satisfied with his fortune.

Meaning/use:

Alludes to a person who is forever dissatisfied with his lot and never has enough.

- Ningún jorobado ve su joroba.

Literal translation:

No hunchback sees his own hump.

Meaning/use:

A rebuke directed at someone who criticizes others for flaws that they possess themselves.

- No cantan dos gallos en un gallinero.

Literal translation:

Two roosters do not crow in a henhouse.

Meaning/use:

Peace is disrupted when two want to impose their authority at the same time and place.

- No hay harina sin salvado.

Literal translation:

No flour without bran.

Meaning/use:

One can't have everything in life; there are always drawbacks.

- No por mucho madrugar, amanece más temprano..

Literal translation:

No matter if you rise early because it does not sunrise earlier.

Meaning/use:

Things have their moment; you can be in hurry but you will not get anything.

- No se puede hacer tortilla sin romper los huevos (alternately: ...algunos huevos)

Literal translation:

One can't make an omelette without breaking eggs.

Meaning/use:

It may be necessary to inflict damage in order to achieve a goal. In Spanish, the phrase is often used in connection with dictators, since it can imply that the ends justify the means.

- No todas las verdades son para dichas (archaic).

Literal translation:

Not every truth should be said.

Meaning/use:

There are truths one should keep to oneself.

- No todo el monte es orégano.

Literal translation:

The whole hillside is not covered in oregano.

Meanings/uses:

In any endeavor, not everything is easy and pleasurable.
May also indicate that things don't always turn out the way we expect.

Comments:

Oregano grows easily all over the Mediterranean basis. It is used as a culinary herb and was valued historically for its medicinal properties.

- Nunca llueve a gusto de todos.

Literal translation:

It never rains to everyone's taste.

Meaning/use:

What some find agreeable and pleasurable others find bothersome and annoying; there's no accounting for taste.

- Perro ladrador, poco mordedor (alternately: Perro que ladra no muerde).

Literal translation:

All bark and no bite. Also refers to someone who blusters or brags but doesn't act when faced with a problem.

Meaning/use:

Those who sound the most threatening are not necessarily the most dangerous.

- Todos los caminos conducen a Roma.

Literal translation and English equivalent:

All roads lead to Rome.

Meaning/origin:

Goals can be achieved by different means. The origin of the phrase may be the Milliarium Aureum, a monument built in 20 BCE by the Roman Emperor Augustus. All roads were said to begin at this monument.

- No hay que mezclar churras con merinas.

Literal translation and English equivalent:

Don't mix churras with merinas.

Meaning/use:

Confusing things that are totally different. Apples and oranges.

Comments:

Churra and Merino are two breeds of Spanish sheep, the former prized for their milk and meat and the latter prized for their wool. When they tried to interbreed the two sheep hoping to get the best of both worlds, the outcome was a total disaster. Because churra is a relatively obscure word, sometimes the phrase is changed to mezclar churros con merinos.

== See also ==
- Paremiology
- List of proverbial phrases (used in English)
- Chinese proverbs
- Japanese proverbs
- Korean proverbs
- Polish proverbs
- Russian proverbs
- Anti-proverb
- Catchphrase

== Sources ==
- "Spanish proverbs and sayings with English translation and comments".
- "Collection of refrains, poems, riddles and puzzles". Archived from the original on 2007-09-04.
