= Korean proverbs =

Linguistic family of idiomatic expressions

A Korean proverb (Korean: 속담, Sok-dam) is a concise idiom in the Korean language which describes a fact in a metaphorical way for instruction or satire. The term 속담 (Sok-dam, Korean proverb) was first used in Korea during the Joseon Dynasty, but proverbs were in use much earlier. The example "I am busy with my work, and I am in a hurry for my family" in the article "욱면비염불서승(郁面婢念佛西昇, Uk myeon biyeombulseoseung)" in Volume 5 of 삼국유사 (三國遺事, Samguk yusa) indicates that a number of proverbs were in common use during the Three Kingdoms period.

== Use ==
A Korean proverb, which generally reflects pre-modern lifestyles and ways of thinking, can be mistakenly thought to have been created only in the past. The proverbs may fall into one of two categories: descriptions of historical events, or descriptions of common events in everyday life.

Although many proverbs derive from descriptions of common events, they may include proper names: historical figures, literary works or regions. The following proverbs contain proper nouns:

- 황정승(黃政丞)댁네 치마 하나 세 모녀가 돌려 입듯 ("As if the mother and daughters in the group of three in official Hwang's household would share a single skirt"): The famous Goryeo and Joseon scholar Hwang Hui was well known for his very frugal lifestyle, in which people joked that his wife and daughters in the household would share one skirt. The proverb thus refers to a very frugal and humble lifestyle.
- 춥기는 사명당(四溟堂)의 사첫방이라 ("When it comes to cold, nothing beats the guestroom of Samyeongdang"): The folktale tells that when Samyeongdang, the Korean Buddhist monk during the Joseon era, went to Japan as an ambassador, he was tricked and imprisoned in the guestroom made of nickel where fire was ignited to kill the monk inside. When Samyeongdang wrote the hanja character 霜 (means frost) in the four wall of the room, the room instead became freezing cold. From the folktale, the following proverb has emerged to describe a very cold room.
- 한상국(韓相國)의 농사짓기 ("Farming in Han Sang-guk")
- 변학도(卞學道) 잔치에 이도령(李道令)의 밥상 ("Lee Do-ryeong's table at the Byeonhak-do feast")
- 운봉(雲峰)이 내 마음을 알지 ("Unbong knows how I feel")
- 조자룡(趙子龍)이 헌 칼 쓰듯 ("Just like Zhao Zilong uses an old sword")
- 장비(張飛)는 만나면 싸움 ("Jangbi fights when they meet")
- 양천현감(楊川縣監) 죽은 말 지키듯 ("Just like Yangcheon-hyeon-gam (楊川縣監) protecting his dead horse")
- 아산(牙山)이 깨어지나 평택(平澤)이 무너지나 ("Asan is broken", or "Pyeongtaek is collapsed")
- 평양감사(平壤監司)도 저 싫으면 그만 ("The position of Pyeongyang inspector is still no good if you do not want it")

An expression becomes a proverb in five steps. First, an individual relates a parable from their imagination or an event. For a parable to become a proverb, it must be generally understood. The five steps are:

- Story
- Description
- Refinement of the description
- Retelling of the story
- Formalization of the story

A proverb begins with a colloquialism, and may be refined with retelling or acquire an odd meaning.

== Structure ==
A Korean proverb may be classified as having one of two forms: short and long. The short form is usually a phrase describing a complex concept, and the long form is a complex sentence. Prosodic and syntactic harmony may be found in a proverb.

=== Prosody ===
Prosodic harmony is achieved in two ways: Abwoon (압운, 押韻) and yul-gyeok (율격, 律格), both meaning rhyme. In a rhyme, syllables with a similar pronunciation are inserted at certain places in a poem. 두운 (Du-woon, 頭韻), 각운 (gak-woon, 脚韻) or word repetition is used. Du-woon is a rhyme at the beginning of a line, and gak-woon is a rhyme at the end of a line. Examples are:

- 바람 부는 대로, 물결 치는 대로 ("As the way wind blows, as the way waves travel"): Refers to going with the flow of the world.
- 소는 소힘, 새는 새힘 ("The bull's power belongs to the bull, and the bird's power belong to the bird"): Used to emphasize that everyone has different talents although their skills may differ.
- 가는 날이 장 날 ("The day you go is the day when town market opens"): Refers to the situation when the one specifically picks the eventful day to travel or attend somewhere by coincidence.
- 꿩 먹고, 알 먹고 ("Eat a pheasant, and also eat an egg"): Refer to the situation where one good event leads to another.
- 지게 지고 제사 지내도 다 제멋 ("Even if I perform a funeral while holding a jige, it is on my own."): Used when asking someone to not interfere with one's business since he/she will do it on his/her own.
- 염불도 몫몫, 쇠뿔도 각각 ("As the Buddhist prayer is to each own, the bull's horns are also separate."): Just like how all people give different Buddhist prayers of their own and bull's horns are pointing towards separate own directions, the proverb is used to emphasize that everyone has own way of doing it.

In Korean proverbs, rhythm consists of two four-syllable feet which are doubled like traditional poetry. Examples are:

- 공든 탑이 무너지랴 ("The tower you put effort to build will not collapse"): Used to emphasize that the work which the one puts effort in will not fail.
- 무른 땅에 말뚝 박기 ("Piling a soft ground"): Used to refer an easy situation or task.

=== Syntax ===
Korean proverbs with syntactic harmony are lengthy. About 10 percent of all proverbs, examples are:

- 가루는 칠수록 고와지고, 말은 할수록 거칠어진다 ("The more you powder, the finer it gets, and the more you talk, the rougher it gets"): Used to emphasize that more argument only leads to harsher words.
- 낮말은 새가 듣고, 밤말은 쥐가 듣는다 ("Birds hear the words of day, and mice hear the words of night"): Used when telling someone to be cautious while sharing a secret.
- 좋은 일에는 남이요, 궂은 일에는 일가라 ("Pretending to be someone else upon the good news, yet calling for the family upon the bad news"): Refers to the people who do not care when good things happen to others while desperately calling others for help when something bad happens to them.
- 꿀 먹은 벙어리요, 침 먹은 지네라 ("As the speechless person who ate honey, as the centipede which ate saliva."): Just like someone who secretly ate a honey and remain speechless upon questioning, or the centipede paralyzed by saliva (related to the myth that saliva can paralyze a centipede), refers to the people who stay speechless or silent to hide their guilts.
- 불 없는 화로, 딸 없는 사위 ("Brazier without fire, son-in-law without daughter"): Refers to the people who no longer hold meaning after having someone cut out from their relationship.
- 내리사랑은 있어도, 치사랑은 없다 ("The downward love may exist, but there is no upward love."): Used to explain that parents often love their children more than their children do.
- 가는 말이 고와야, 오는 말이 곱다 ("When you send out nice words, the nice words return to you."): Used to emphasize that people will speak nicely to you when you also speak nicely to them.
- 윗물이 맑아야, 아랫물이 맑다 ("When upstream water is clear, downstream water is also clear."): Used to emphasize that the leaders in charge must be free of problematic behaviors in order for the people under to be the same.
- 입은 거지는 먹어도, 벗은 거지는 못 먹는다 ("A clothed beggar can eat, but a naked beggar cannot"): Used to emphasize that you must dress neatly and properly to earn people's respect.

== Literary forms ==
Proverbs have two forms: poetry and narrative.

=== Poetry ===
Many poetic proverbs have a concise word form, consisting of one line or two phrases. Eight syllables are most often used, followed by nine or seven syllables. The eight syllables have a 4-4 rhythm in the letter count and two feet. In addition to the 4-4 letter rhythm, 3-4, 5-5, 6-5, 6-6 and 7-5 letter rhythms are used.

Examples of letter-count rhythm are:

- 동무 따라 강남 간다 ("Following a friend to go to Gangnam "; 4-4): Refers to the situation in which the one still follows another against one's will.
- 자는 범 코침 주기 ("Stabbing a sleeping tiger in its nose"; 3-4): Refers to the situation in which someone
- 금일 충청도 명일 경상도 ("Chungcheong-do today, Gyeongsang-do tomorrow"; 5-5): Refers to travelling aimlessly.
- 구더기 무서워 장 못 담글까 ("Being afraid of maggots does not mean you cannot ferment seasoning"; 6-5): Used to emphasize that you should not give up out of smaller or less important fear.
- 토끼 죽으니 여우 슬퍼한다 ("When the rabbit dies, the fox mourns"; 6-6): Refers to the situation in which one mourns the tragedy of one's kind.

Examples of foot rhythm are:

- 안성 맞춤/안장 맞춤 ("perfect fit")
- 이마에 부은 물이/발뒤꿈치로 흐른다 ("Water poured on the forehead flows to the heels")

Some proverbs are used in folk songs:

|님아 님아 우리 님아
이제 가면 언제 올래
동솥에 삶은 밤이 꼭꼬 울면 다시 올래
고목나무 새싹 돋아
꽃이 피면 다시 올래

My dear, my dear
If you go now, when will you come?
When the chestnuts steaming in a copper pot lets out cry, will you come back?
When a sprout grow out of the old tree,
will you come back after it blooms to a flower?

=== Narrative ===
Some simple proverbs include a narrative, which may precede or follow the proverb.

== Uses ==
Proverbs may be instructive or satirical. The proverb "It's dark under the base of a lamp" is generally interpreted as instructive; the truth may be hidden in plain sight. Other proverbs may employ gentle mockery. "There is no dinner in the twelve skills" notes that not all abilities can be used to earn a living, and the hearer of a proverb (a child, or a friend who wants to borrow money) affects the proverb's meaning. Half-sentence proverbs (such as "Can one hand clap?") are often used satirically.

== See also ==
- List of proverbial phrases (used in English)
- Chinese proverbs
- Japanese proverbs
- Polish proverbs
- Russian proverbs
- Spanish proverbs
