= Witold Doroszewski =

Polish lexicographer and linguist (1899–1976)

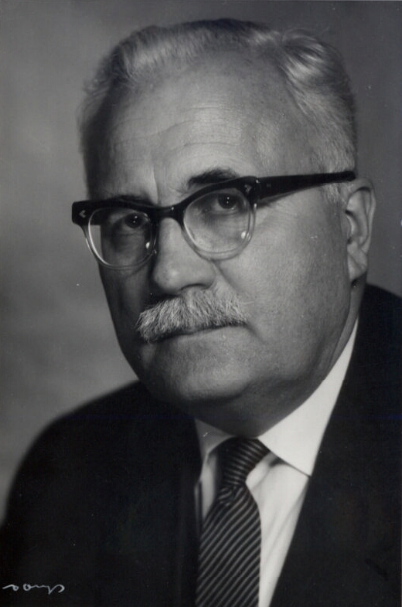
- Born: 1899
- Died: 1976 (aged 76–77)
- Occupation: linguist

Witold Doroszewski (1899–1976) was a Polish lexicographer and linguist.

== Career ==
In 1936, he served as the first professor of Polish at the University of Wisconsin. He left the following year to continue teaching at the University of Warsaw.
