= Baka wa kaze o hikanai =

Japanese expression

Baka wa kaze o hikanai (in Japanese: 馬鹿は風邪を引かない) is a Japanese proverb and urban legend that translates to "idiots don't catch colds".

== Origin ==
The phrase is said to have become popular during the Edo period (1600s–1800s).

== Meaning ==
The phrase does not mean that certain people do not get sick, but it implies that carefree people are less likely to notice they are sick or to worry about being sick.
