= Spare the rod =

Spare the rod may refer to:

- "Spare the rod and spoil the child," a line from the satirical 17th-century Samuel Butler poem Hudibras, commonly attributed to the Bible;
- "He that spareth his rod hateth his son: but he that loveth him chasteneth him betimes" (KJV), a Biblical verse from Proverbs 13:24;
- Spare the Rod, a 1953 Terrytoons animated short film
- Spare the Rod (1954 film), a Disney animated short film
- Spare the Rod (1961 film), a British social drama directed by Leslie Norman and starring Max Bygraves
