= Michael Radau =

Prussian priest, Jesuit and theologian (1617–1697)

Michael Radau (1617–1687) was a Prussian priest, Jesuit and theologian. He was a professor of rhetoric in the Braniewo collegium around 1641. Later he resided in Königsberg (around 1654 to 1675).

== Works ==
He is known for his Orator extemporeneus (1672).
