= Xiehouyu =

Type of Chinese proverb of two parts, where the latter half is typically omitted

- Traditional Chinese: 歇後語
- Simplified Chinese: 歇后语
- Literal meaning: A saying with the latter-part suspended
Transcriptions
Standard Mandarin
- Hanyu Pinyin: xiēhòuyǔ
- Wade–Giles: Hsieh^{1}-hou^{4}-yü^{3}
Yue: Cantonese
- Yale Romanization: Hit hauh yúh
- Jyutping: Hit3 hau6 jyu5

Xiehouyu are a type of Chinese proverb consisting of a former segment that presents a novel scenario, and a latter provides the rationale thereof. One would often only state the first part, expecting the listener to know the second. Xiehouyu are examples of anapodota, a class of rhetorical device found across different languages. Compare English an apple a day (keeps the doctor away) and speak of the devil (and he shall appear).

The Chinese word xiehouyu may be literally translated as 'truncated witticism'. Puns are often involved in xiehouyu. In this case, the second part is derived from the first through one meaning, but then another possible meaning of the second part is taken as the true meaning. Some analogous examples in English might sound like "get hospitalized" to mean "be patient", or "small transactions only" to mean "no big deal". Thus, a xiehouyu in one dialect can be unintelligible to a listener speaking another. Valuable linguistic data can sometimes be gleaned from ancient xiehouyu.

== Origin ==
Xiehouyu have been coined since ancient times as short, funny and figurative sentences consisting of two parts. The leading part acts like a riddle, and the latter part completes the phrase.

== Examples ==
- simplified Chinese: 外甥打灯笼——照舅 (旧); traditional Chinese: 外甥打燈籠——照舅 (舊); pinyin: wàishēng dǎ dēnglong — zhào jiù; trans. "Nephew handling a lantern — illuminating his uncle/according to the old [way]"
  - gloss: as usual, as before
  - Note: 舅 and 舊/旧 are homophones, and 照 means "according to" as well as "to illuminate"
- simplified Chinese: 皇帝的女儿——不愁嫁; traditional Chinese: 皇帝的女兒——不愁嫁; pinyin: huángdì de nǚér — bù chóu jià; trans. "The daughter of the emperor — need not worry that she cannot soon be wed"
  - gloss: someone or something that is always wanted
- 鲤鱼吃水——吞吞吐吐; 鯉魚吃水——吞吞吐吐; lǐyú chī shuǐ — tūntūn tǔtǔ; "Carp drinks water — swallow and spit"
  - gloss: speaking hesitantly
  - Note: 吞吞吐吐 (swallow and spit) is used describe someone speaking hesitantly
- 二万五千里长征——任重道远; 二萬五千里長征——任重道遠; èrwàn wǔqiān lǐ chángzhēng — rènzhòngdàoyuǎn; "25000 lis long Long March — arduous journey"
- 芦沟桥上石狮子——数不清; 蘆溝橋上石獅子——數不清; Lúgōuqiáo shang shí shīzi — shǔ bù qīng; "Stone lions on Lu Gou Bridge — uncountably many"
  - gloss: A very large amount.
  - Note: There are numerous stone lions on Lu Gou Bridge.
- 茶壶里煮饺子——有口倒不出; 茶壺裏煮餃子——有口倒不出; cháhú lǐ zhǔ jiǎozi — yǒu kǒu dào bù chū; "Cooking dumplings in a tea kettle — cannot be poured out despite having an opening"
  - gloss: unable to say something
  - Note: 口 can mean both "opening" and "mouth".
- 船头上跑马——走投无路; 船頭上跑馬——走投無路; chuántóu shang pǎo mǎ — zǒutóuwúlù; "Riding a horse on the ship's bow — nowhere to go"
- 打破沙锅——（问）璺到底; 打破沙鍋——璺（問）到底; dǎ pò shāguō — wèn dào dǐ; "break a pot — cracks to the bottom"
  - gloss: Insisting on getting to the bottom of a question or problem
  - Note: 璺 (cracks) and 问/問 (ask) have the same pronunciation
- 滴水石穿——非一日之功; dī shuǐ shí chuān — fēi yírì zhī gōng; "Water drops penetrates stone — not done in one day"
- 电线杆上绑鸡毛——好大的掸（胆）子; 電線桿上綁雞毛——好大的撣（膽）子; diàn xiàn gǎn shàng bǎng jī máo — hǎo dà de dǎn (dǎn) zi; "Tying chicken feathers on power pole — what a big feather duster"
  - gloss: Being cocky
  - Note: 掸子 (duster) and 胆子 (guts) have the same pronunciation
- 粪坑里的石头——又臭又硬; 糞坑裏的石頭——又臭又硬; fènkēng lǐ de shítou — yòu chòu yòu yìng; "stone in the cesspit — smelly and hard"
  - gloss: To describe someone being stubborn
  - Note: 又臭又硬 literally means "smelly and hard", but is also used to say someone is stubborn
- 脚踩两只船——摇摆不定; 腳踩兩隻船——搖擺不定; jiǎo cǎi liǎng zhī chuán — yáo bǎi bú dìng; "Each foot stepping on one boat — swinging back and forth"
  - gloss: Unable to make a decision
  - Note: 摇摆/搖擺不定 literally means "swinging back and forth", but is also used to express a situation where a decision is tough to be made
- 老虎的屁股——摸不得; lǎohǔ de pìgu — mō bù dé; "Tiger's butt — mustn't touch"
- 黄鼠狼给鸡拜年——不怀好意; 黃鼠狼給雞拜年——不懷好意; huángshǔláng gěi jī bàinián — búhuáihǎoyì; "A Siberian weasel wishing Happy New Year to a chicken — harboring no good intention"
- 肉 包子 打 狗 —— 有 去 无 回; 肉包子打狗——有去無回; ròu bāozi dǎ gǒu — yǒuqùwúhuí; "hitting a dog by throwing meat dumplings — gone, never returns"
- 手榴弹炸茅房——激起公愤（粪）; 手榴彈炸茅房——激起公憤（糞）; shǒuliúdàn zhà máofáng — jī qǐ gōngfèn (fèn); "Throwing grenade into a public toilet — stirring up public anger"
  - Note: 愤/憤 (anger of the public) and 粪/糞 (feces) have the same pronunciation

== See also ==
- Chengyu: Chinese "set phrases" reflecting conventional wisdom
- Homophonic puns in Mandarin Chinese
- Proverbs commonly said to be Chinese
