= Anapodoton =

Figure of speech

An anapodoton (from Ancient Greek ἀναπόδοτον anapódoton: "that which lacks an apodosis", that is, the consequential clause in a conditional sentence), plural anapodota, is a rhetorical device related to the anacoluthon; both involve a thought being interrupted or discontinued before it is fully expressed. Anapodota in the strict sense of the term involve one clause expressed and another semantically connected clause that is omitted (i.e., implied rather than expressed). Anapodota in the broad sense of the term include that type plus any in which a single clause has its predicate omitted (i.e., implied rather than expressed). In the clause-omission type, the stand-alone expressed clause suggests or implies the other clause, but the latter is not expressed.In the predicate-omission type, the stand-alone expressed subject suggests or implies the predicate, but the latter is not expressed.

As an intentional rhetorical device, an anapodoton is generally used for set phrases, where the full form is understood, and would thus be tedious to spell out, as in "When in Rome [do as the Romans do]."

Anapodota are common in Classical Chinese and languages that draw from it, such as Korean and Japanese, where a long literary phrase is commonly abbreviated to just its condition. For example, Zhuangzi's phrase "a frog in a well cannot conceive of the ocean" (井鼃不可以語於海者拘於虛也), meaning "people of limited experience have a narrow world view", is rendered as "a frog in a well" (Chinese: 井底之蛙, Korean: 우물 안 개구리, Japanese: 井の中の蛙), the last abbreviating "a frog in a well does not know the great ocean" (井の中の蛙大海を知らず).

== Other uses ==
It is also said to occur when a main clause is left unsaid due to a speaker interrupting him/herself to revise a thought, thus leaving the initial clause unresolved, but then making use of it nonetheless by recasting and absorbing it into a new, grammatically complete sentence.

Anapodoton is a commonplace feature of everyday informal speech. It, therefore, appears frequently in dramatic writing and in fiction in the form of direct speech or the representation of stream of consciousness.

Examples:

- "If you think I'm going to sit here and take your insults..."

(implied: "then you are mistaken")

- "When life gives you lemons..."

(implied: "you make lemonade")

- "If they came to hear me beg..."

(implied: "then they will be disappointed")

- "The only easy day..."

(implied: "was yesterday")

- "When the going gets tough..."

(implied: "the tough get going")

- "If you can’t stand the heat..."

(implied: "get out of the kitchen")

- "Birds of a feather..."

(implied: "flock together")

- "Great minds..."

(implied: "think alike")

== See also ==
- Aposiopesis
- Xiehouyu
