= A journey of a thousand miles begins with a single step =

Common saying ascribed to Lao Tzu

- Traditional Chinese: 千里之行始於足下
- Simplified Chinese: 千里之行始于足下
- Literal meaning: A journey of a thousand li starts beneath one's feet
Transcriptions
Standard Mandarin
- Hanyu Pinyin: Qiānlǐ zhīxíng shǐyú zúxià
Yue: Cantonese
- Yale Romanization: Chīn léih jī hàhng chí yū jūk hah
- Jyutping: Cin1 lei5 zi1 hang4 ci2 jyu1 zuk1 haa6

"A journey of a thousand miles begins with a single step" is a common saying that originated from the Chinese proverb 千里之行始于足下. The quotation is from chapter 64 of the Tao Te Ching, a foundational work of Taoism, ascribed to Laozi, although it is also erroneously ascribed to his contemporary Confucius. This saying teaches that even the longest and most difficult ventures have a starting point; something which begins with one first step.

The phrase is also translated as "a journey of a thousand miles begins from under the feet" and "a thousand mile journey begins where one stands".

== Philosophy ==
The adage reflects the inevitability of the progression between the Chinese philosophical concepts of quantitative change (量变) and qualitative change (质变).

The preceding line in the original text is also well known in China, and expresses a similar meaning: 合抱之木生于毫末 / 九层之台起于累土 ("A huge tree that fills one's arms grows from a tiny seedling; a nine-storied tower rises from a heap of Earth.")
