= Julian Krzyżanowski =

Polish scholar of literature and folklore (1892–1976)

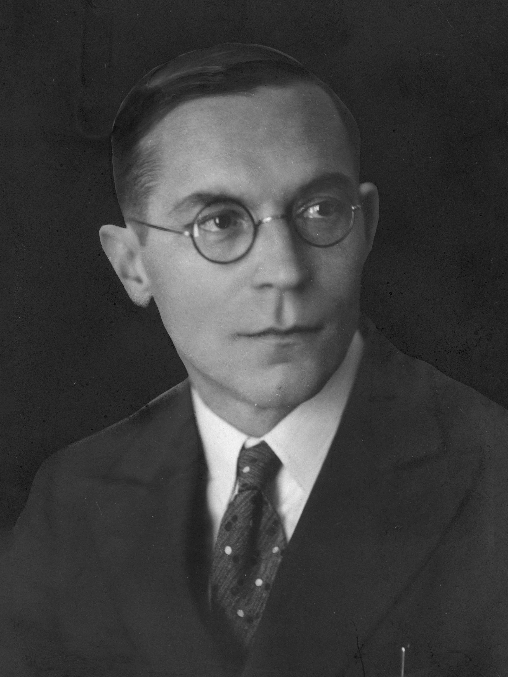
Julian Krzyżanowski

Julian Krzyżanowski (4 July 1892 – 19 May 1976) was a Polish literature and folklore scholar, best known for his study of Polish proverbs. Participant of the Warsaw Uprising. Professor at the Warsaw University and others. Recipient of Order of Polonia Restituta. He has been recognized as one of the most significant contributors to the field of Polish paremiology after World War II.

In 1964 he was one of the signatories of the Letter of 34 to Prime Minister Józef Cyrankiewicz regarding freedom of culture.

== Work ==
Krzyżanowski was the editor of the largest and most reputable collection of Polish proverbs up to date, called the "bible of Polish proverbs", Nowa księga przysłów i wyrażeń przysłowiowych polskich (New Book of Polish Proverbs and Proverbial Expressions, also known as Nowa Księga przysłów polskich, A New Book of Polish Proverbs, published in several volumes in the years 1969–1978). Despite the proliferation of similar works, in 2012 his work was still described as "the most comprehensive" work of its type in Poland.
