= Grzegorz Knapski =

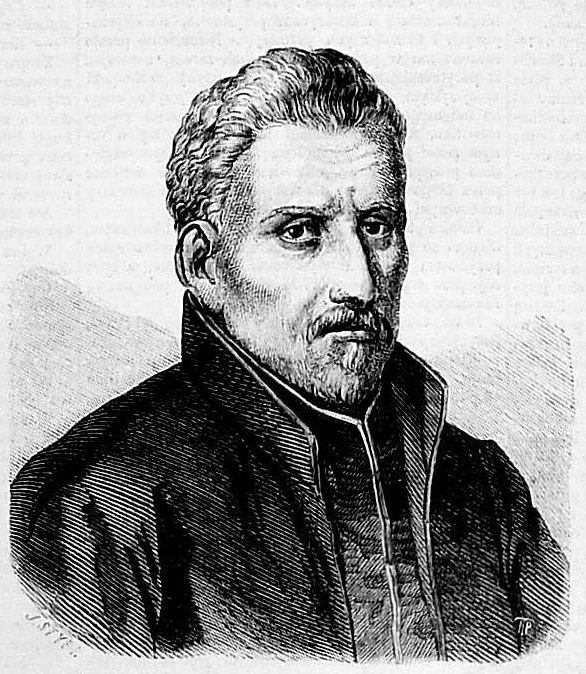
- Born: 1561; Gmina Grodzisk Mazowiecki, Polish–Lithuanian Commonwealth
- Died: 1639 (aged 77–78); Kraków, Polish–Lithuanian Commonwealth
- Occupations: Jesuit; teacher; philologist; lexicographer; writer
- Writing career
- Notable work: Thesaurus Polono-Latino-Graecus

Grzegorz Knapski (Knapiusz, Cnapius; 1561–1639) was a Polish Jesuit, teacher, philologist, lexicographer and writer.

== Works ==
His most important work is the Thesaurus Polono-Latino-Graecus. First published in 1621 in Kraków, second edition in 1643 also in Kraków, it became a standard reference work in Polish schools and universities until the 18th century.

== See also ==
- List of Poles
