= Proverbs in The Lord of the Rings =

Component of Tolkien's writings

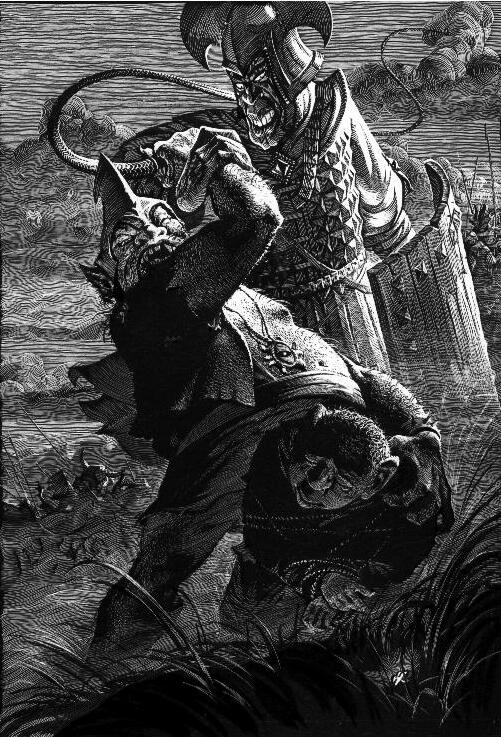
"Where there's a whip there's a will": Orcs driving a Hobbit across the plains of Rohan. Scraperboard illustration by Alexander Korotich, 1995

The author J. R. R. Tolkien uses many proverbs in The Lord of the Rings to create a feeling that the world of Middle-earth is both familiar and solid, and to give a sense of the different cultures of the Hobbits, Men, Elves, and Dwarves who populate it. Scholars have also commented that the proverbs are sometimes used directly to portray characters such as Barliman Butterbur, who never has time to collect his thoughts. Often these proverbs serve to make Tolkien's created world seem at once real and solid, while also remaining somewhat unfamiliar. Further, the proverbs help to convey Tolkien's underlying message about providence; while he keeps his Christianity hidden, readers can see that what appears as luck to the protagonists reflects a higher purpose throughout Tolkien's narrative.

== Appearances ==
There are many proverbs in The Lord of the Rings; estimates range from 29 to "about 110", depending on the criteria used to distinguish proverbs from other sayings. Some are traditional, some adapted, and many were invented by Tolkien. They are used variously by the free peoples of Middle-earth, namely Hobbits, Men, Elves, and Dwarves, as well as by Wizards and Orcs.

Example uses of proverbs by Middle-earth peoples
Race	Speaker	Situation	Middle-earth proverb	Real-world proverb	LOTR Chapter
Elf	Glorfindel	On the lies of Saruman about the One Ring	"Yet oft in lies truth is hidden"	"Many a true word is spoken in jest"	2:2 "The Council of Elrond"
Dwarf	Gimli	On the need for formal oaths to bind the Fellowship	"Yet sworn word may strengthen quaking heart"		2:3 "The Ring Goes South"
Hobbit	Gaffer Gamgee	On Sam Gamgee's return, and the "scouring" of the Shire	"It's an ill wind as blows nobody any good ..." "And All's well as ends Better!"	"It's an ill wind that blows nobody any good" "All's Well that Ends Well"	6:9 "The Grey Havens"
Man	Boromir, Aragorn	On hearing wolves in the wilds of Eregion	"The wolf that one hears is worse than the orc that one fears." "But where the warg howls, there also the orc prowls."		2:4 "A Journey in the Dark"
Wizard	Gandalf	Of Barliman Butterbur, who may not seem very bright, but ...	"He can see through a brick wall in time (as they say in Bree)"		2:1 "Many Meetings"
Orc	An Orc-driver	Chasing on Frodo and Sam, who are dressed as Orcs	"Where there's a whip, there's a will"	"Where there's a will there's a way"	6:2 "The Land of Shadow"

In addition, familiar sayings and platitudes form part of the speech of some characters, and the songs of the Hobbits express sentiments that sound like proverbs.

== Analysis ==
=== Simple wisdom ===
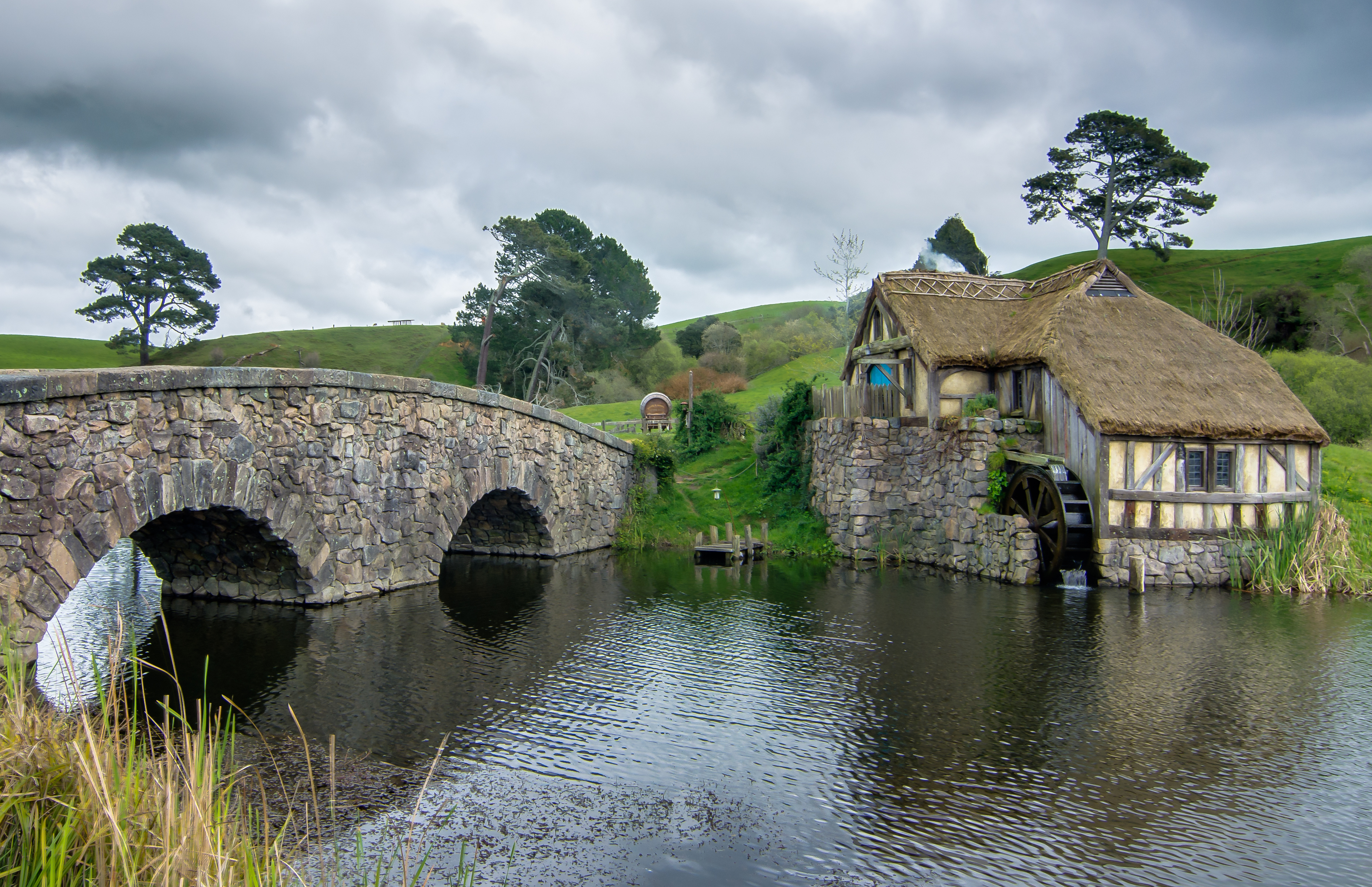
The Hobbit proverb "You've got to have grist before you can grind" – you cannot make flour without grain – would have been obvious to all who knew the Hobbiton mill.

David Rowe comments on the simple wisdom of many Hobbit proverbs, describing them as "terse, often humorous, and defiantly pragmatic; ... plain Hobbit-sense". He notes that they are often rooted in familiar daily work, as in "You've got to have grist before you can grind" (6.8 "The Scouring of the Shire"), an allusion to the task of milling grain. He observes, too, that Hobbit proverbs have a "gnarled and rather fatalistic" worldview, countered by their delight in "simple pleasures" like food, beer, and pipe-smoking. He cites as an example of this "Frodo's marvellously vivid 'Short cuts make delays, but inns make longer ones'" (1.4 "A Short Cut to Mushrooms"). In Rowe's view, these embody "a living tradition", enabling shared experience to be "fitted to the present moment and the immediate need."

=== Portraying character ===
Wayne G. Hammond and Christina Scull, in The Lord of the Rings: A Reader's Companion, state that Tolkien has Barliman Butterbur, the fat bustling landlord of The Prancing Pony inn at Bree, speak in a mass of "commonplace sayings" such as "I'm run off my feet", proverbs like "It never rains but it pours, we say in Bree", and shortly after that "One thing drives out another, so to speak". Katharyn W. Crabbe comments that Barliman's constant stream of common sayings "is perfect as a representation of the conversation of a man who is too busy to concentrate" on anything, suggesting "a kind of semiconscious conversation", so that when he finally admits he forgot to send Gandalf's letter of warning to Frodo, the reader has "a shock of recognition".

=== Injecting humour ===
Esther Clinton, in Proverbium, discusses the playful use of proverbs to inject humour as well as to make a point in the story. In "The Council of Elrond", Gandalf tells of his anger – she notes that he is known for his fiery temper – on finding that Butterbur had failed to send on his letter to Frodo, and humorously combines two proverbs about dogs to describe himself. At another moment in the wild, Merry proposes one river crossing after another, and Aragorn rolls two proverbs into one in reply:

Esther Clinton's analysis of play on proverbs
Speaker	Utterance	Traditional proverbs	Effect	LOTR chapter
The Wizard Gandalf	"‘I did not bite, and I barked very little"	His bark is worse than his bite. Barking dogs don't bite.	Humour; "a reminder that even Gandalf makes mistakes, is imperfect, and ... is able to acknowledge it"; a hint of Gandalf's "doggedness"	2:2 "The Council of Elrond"
The Ranger Aragorn	"One river at a time!"	One thing at a time! We'll cross that bridge when we come to it.	Humour; play on two proverbs; takes metaphorical language literally	1:12 "Flight to the Ford"

=== Making the world real ===
Crabbe notes the proverb-exchange between Elrond and Gimli:

"Faithless is he that says farewell when the road darkens", said Gimli.
"Maybe", said Elrond, "but let him not vow to walk in the dark, who has not seen the nightfall."
"Yet sworn word may strengthen quaking heart", said Gimli.
"Or break it", said Elrond.

— 2:3 "The Ring Goes South"

She comments that statements "of traditional wisdom" are entertainingly placed in opposition to each other. In her view, Tolkien was suggesting in exchanges like this one that proverbs are at best only partly true, and as such are of limited use as guides to action. She comments that such proverbs serve to "build the sense of the familiar, but also to create a sense of the individuality of cultures" among the various races. She adds that even if readers do not catch the references, they get a feeling of the solid reality of Middle-earth, since having a folk-wisdom suggests a culture like those that they know makes sense, feels coherent, and appears to be governed by a set of discernible rules: "in short, to seem real".

The Tolkien scholar Tom Shippey writes that there are several such exchanges in the novel, usually involving dwarves, though there is one between Théoden King of Rohan and the Hobbit Merry Brandybuck. The differing styles of the races build up a picture in the reader's mind, he writes, of the diversity of Middle-earth, and dramatises the debates on ethics between the characters; the statements of the dwarves indicate "a kind of unyielding scepticism".

The Riddle of Strider

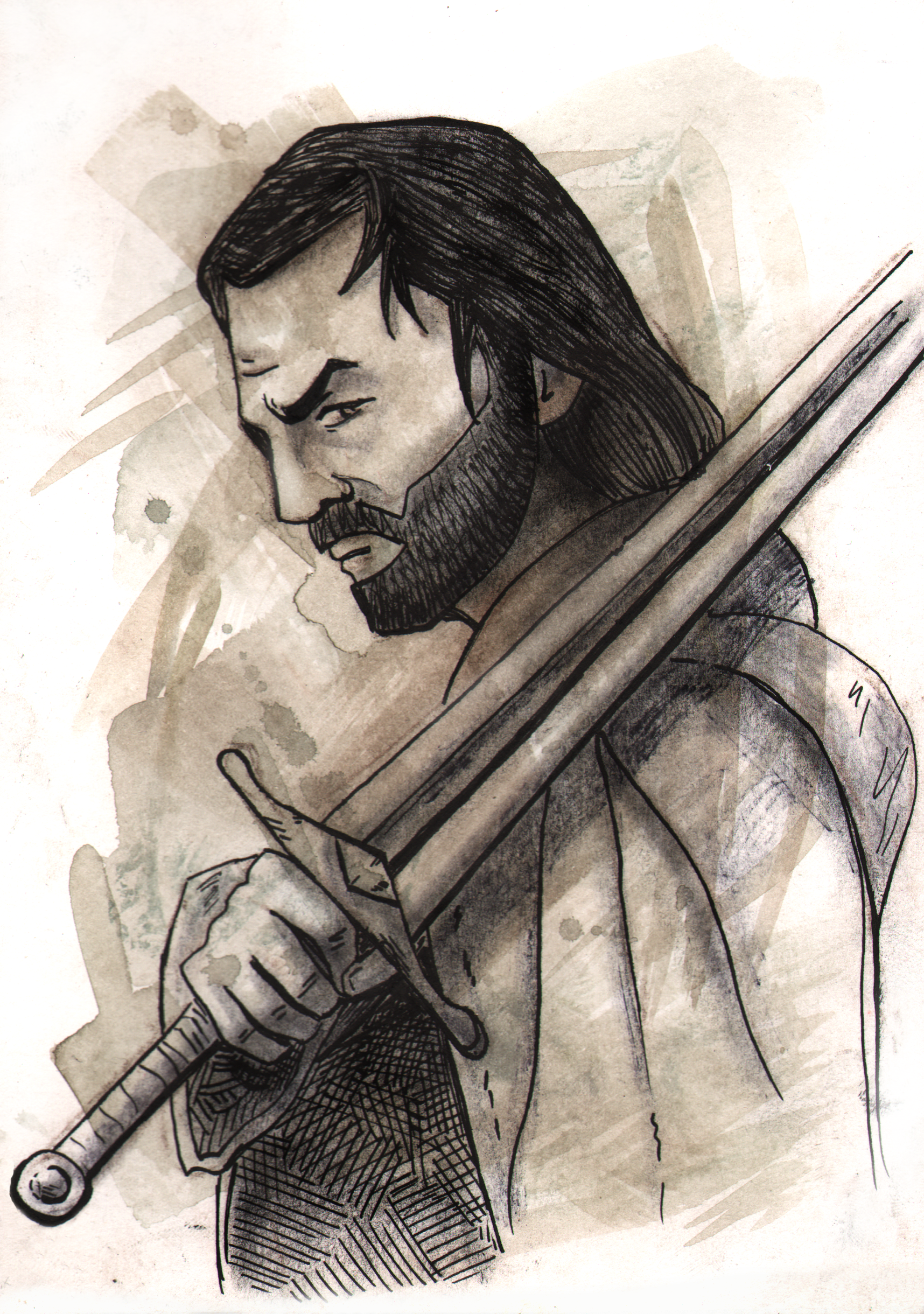

All that is gold does not glitter,
Not all those who wander are lost;
The old that is strong does not wither,
Deep roots are not reached by the frost.

— J. R. R. Tolkien, 1:10 "Strider",
The Lord of the Rings

The scholar of folklore Heather A. Haas, in the Journal of American Folklore, writes that proverbs in Tolkien's fantasy may help to link the created world with the familiar, while simultaneously distinguishing the two. She notes that they may equally be used to delineate a character's personality, attitudes, and views, and to point to underlying themes.

=== Pointing to the character of reality ===
Shippey writes that the proverbs scattered across the book lend weight to the subtle implications of the text's interlaced structure. While the real-world proverbs are broadly neutral, although some remain optimistic or gloomy, the invented proverbs are, he suggests, closer to Tolkien's thought. So Théoden's "Oft evil will shall evil mar", Aragorn's "The hasty stroke goes oft astray", or Gandalf's "A traitor may betray himself", all contribute to Tolkien's portrayal of what he believed was the character of reality. The implied message is that what appears as luck to the protagonists – if they keep up their courage, and ignore, in a similar manner as Frodo and Sam, "their bewilderments, infatuations, sense of being lost and abandoned" – is indeed a higher purpose and that all can work out well.

The scholar of literature Randel Helms writes that the "significance" of the destruction of Saruman's realm of Isengard is summarized by a pair of similar proverbs, Théoden's maxim just mentioned, and Gandalf's "Often does hatred hurt itself"; the action of the Ents taking revenge on Saruman then shows just how providential control and cause-and-effect morality work out in practice.

One exchange of sentiments that Shippey states "sound like proverbs" is between the Dwarf Gimli and his friend the Elf Legolas as they examine the stonework of Minas Tirith, the city of the Men of Gondor. Gimli says that Men begin things, but a frost or a blight comes, "and they fail of their promise". Legolas replies that "seldom do they fail of their seed", adding that it will "lie in the dust" and "spring up again in times and places unlooked-for". Shippey remarks that the seed lying in the dust recalls the New Testament Parable of the Sower, and wonders if Tolkien is having these "soulless creatures", Dwarf and Elf, talk about the coming of Jesus to save the world. He points out that this would be "an odd effect" in a book that Tolkien described in a letter as "a fundamentally religious and Catholic work; but all the same, not a contradiction, as in his view it would make sense for the virtuous pagans to have an inkling that a Saviour might one day come.

=== Complex effects ===
George Boswell evaluates the proverbs' contribution to the work's success. He identified 29 utterances as definite proverbs, not considering any Orc utterance to be a proverb. In his view, eight of the proverbs are Wellerisms, humorous sayings with facetious sequels, giving as example

"'Where there's life there's hope', as my Gaffer used to say; 'and need of vittles', as he mostways used to add", said Sam.

— 4:7 "Journey to the Cross-roads"

Boswell notes the presence of several figures of speech in the proverbs, including (in decreasing order of frequency) antithesis, alliteration, metaphor, personification, hyperbole, synecdoche, and (once each) assonance, simile, metonymy, litotes, and onomatopoeia. He located 13 of the 29 in books about proverbs, identifying them as more or less unaltered English forms, such as Éomer's "Need brooks no delay, yet late is better than never"; two others he thought were platitudes. Of the original proverbs, four were "of local application only", and the remaining ten could be considered "viable" new proverbs. In his view, Tolkien's interweaving of originality and tradition in his phrasing, as in his creation of races, helped to make his style effective.

B. A. Afanasiev and C. B. Krivopustova write that the multiple features of Tolkien's proverbs, sometimes including both direct and figurative meanings, make them exceptionally difficult to translate. Attempting to translate it into Russian, they compare five existing translations of "Oft hope is born, when all is forlorn", as said by Legolas to Gimli. Finding none of these translations satisfactory, they supply their own version, "Nadezhda voznikayet tam, gde podstupayet t'ma k vratam" (Hope arises where darkness approaches the gates). (Note: The complete passage in Cyrillic is "Выше бороду, отпрыск Дурина! – воскликнул он. – Говорят ведь: «Надежда возникает там, где подступает тьма к вратам». Но что за надежду он увидел вдали – так и не сказал." No chto za nadezhdu on uvidel vdali – tak i ne skazal.") They state that despite their best efforts, managing to retain the rhyme, assonance, and archaism of the English original, their translation unintentionally adds figurative content.

== Sources ==
- Afanasiev, В. А.; Krivopustova, С. В. (2017). "The Issues of Translation of 'Invented Proverbs' in The Lord of the Rings BY JRR Tolkien". Актуальные проблемы гуманитарных и естественных наук [Actual problems of the humanities and natural sciences] (in Russian). 6 (4). article 14.
- Boswell, George W. (1969). "Proverbs and Phraseology in Tolkien's Lord of the Rings Complex". Studies in English. 10. Article 6.
- Clinton, Esther (2014). "Proverbial Play: J.R.R. Tolkien's Use of Proverbs and Proverbial Expressions in The Lord of the Rings and The Hobbit". Proverbium. 31: 133–165.
- Crabbe, Katharyn (1988) [1981]. J.R.R. Tolkien (Revised ed.). F. Ungar. ISBN 978-0-8044-2106-5. OCLC 7279806.
- Haas, Heather A. (2011). "The Wisdom of Wizards-and Muggles and Squibs: Proverb Use in the World of Harry Potter". The Journal of American Folklore. 124 (492). University of Illinois Press: 29–54. doi:10.5406/jamerfolk.124.492.0029. ISSN 0021-8715.
- Hammond, Wayne G.; Scull, Christina (2005). The Lord of the Rings: A Reader's Companion. HarperCollins. ISBN 978-0-00-720907-1. OCLC 60667786.
- Helms, Randel (1971). "The Structure and Aesthetic of Tolkien's Lord of the Rings". Mythcon Proceedings. 1 (2). Article 2.
- Rowe, David (2016). The Proverbs of Middle-earth. Oloris Publishing. ISBN 978-1-9409-9247-1. OCLC 968131917.
- Shippey, Tom (2005) [1982]. The Road to Middle-Earth (Third ed.). HarperCollins. ISBN 978-0-261-10275-0.
- Shippey, Tom (2007). "Proverbiality in Tolkien". Roots and Branches: Selected Papers on Tolkien. Cormarë Series. Vol. 11. Walking Tree Publishers. pp. 303–319. ISBN 978-3-905703-05-4.
