= Don't judge a book by its cover (disambiguation) =

"Don't judge a book by its cover" is a popular saying. It (or variants) may refer to:

- "You Can't Judge a Book by the Cover", Bo Diddley song, 1962
- "You Can't Judge a Book by Its Cover", an episode of the TV series Desperate Housewives
- ”Don't Judge A Book By Its Cover”, a Thomas & Friends song
