= Witch-king of Angmar =

Character in Tolkien's Middle-earth

The Lord of the Nazgûl, also called the Witch-king of Angmar, the Pale King, or Black Captain, is a fictional character in J. R. R. Tolkien's fantasy novel The Lord of the Rings. He is one of the Nine Men that became Nazgûl (Ringwraiths) after receiving Rings of Power from the Dark Lord Sauron. His ring gives him great power, but enslaves him to Sauron and makes him invisible. As a wraith, he had once established himself King of Angmar in the north of Eriador. In the events of the Lord of the Rings, he stabs the bearer of the One Ring, the Hobbit Frodo Baggins, with a Morgul-knife which would reduce its victim to a wraith. Much later, in his final battle, the Lord of the Nazgûl attacks Éowyn with a mace. The Hobbit Merry Brandybuck stabs him with an ancient enchanted Númenórean blade, allowing Éowyn to kill him with her sword.

In early drafts, Tolkien had called him the "Wizard King", and considered making him either a renegade member of the Istari, or an immortal Maia, before settling on having him as a mortal Man, corrupted by a Ring of Power given to him by Sauron. Commentators have written that the Lord of the Nazgûl functions at the level of myth when, his own name forgotten, he calls himself Death and bursts the gates of Minas Tirith with a battering-ram engraved with magical spells. At a theological level, he embodies a vision of evil similar to Karl Barth's description of evil as das Nichtige, an active and powerful force that turns out to be empty. The prophecy that the Lord of the Nazgûl would not die by the hand of Man echoes that made of the title character in William Shakespeare's Macbeth.

== Fictional history ==
Image map with clickable links of the north-west of Middle-earth at the end of the Third Age, showing Arnor in the north of Eriador (left), with the Witch-kingdom of Angmar at the northern end of the Misty Mountains (top centre).

The Witch-king first appears in the Second Age of Middle-earth. The Dark Lord Sauron gave Rings of Power to powerful Men, including kings of countries in Middle-earth. These confer magical power, but also enslave their wearers to the owner of the One Ring, Sauron himself. (Note: Tolkien 1977, "The Akallabêth", p. 267. "Yet Sauron was ever guileful, and it is said that among those whom he ensnared with the Nine Rings three were great lords of Númenórean race.") (Note: Tolkien 1980, 4. "The Hunt for the Ring" i. "Of the Journey of the Black Riders")

The Lord of the Nazgûl appears as the Witch-king of Angmar during the Third Age and is instrumental in the destruction of the Northern kingdom of Arnor. (Note: Tolkien 1955, Appendix A, 1 "The Numenorean Kings") In his notes for translators, Tolkien suggested that the Witch-king of Angmar, ruler of a Northern kingdom with its capital at Carn Dûm, was of Númenórean origin. (Note: Tolkien writes: "the name and origin of the Witch-king is not recorded, but he was probably of Númenórean descent." Hammond & Scull 2005, p. 20. Tolkien later removed the passage; it does not appear in the version in Jared Lobdell's A Tolkien Compass.) Nothing is heard of him when Sauron is overthrown by the Last Alliance of Elves and Men late in the Second Age, but his survival is assured by the power of the One Ring. (Note: Tolkien 1955, Appendix B, "The Tale of Years", entries in "The Second Age")

Over a thousand years later in the Third Age, the Lord of the Nazgûl leads Sauron's forces against the successor kingdoms of Arnor: Rhudaur, Cardolan, and Arthedain. He destroys all of these, but is eventually defeated by the Elf-lord Glorfindel, who puts him to flight, and speaks the prophecy that "not by the hand of Man will he fall". (Note: Tolkien 1955, Appendix A, I, iv "Gondor and the heirs of Anarion") He escapes, and returns to Mordor. There, he gathers the other Nazgûl to prepare for Sauron's return. (Note: Tolkien 1955, Appendix B, "The Tale of Years", entries in "The Third Age")

Towards the end of the Third Age, Sauron sends the Witch-king, leading the other Nazgûl, to the Shire to find and recover the One Ring. He is cloaked and hooded in black; his face cannot be seen; he rides a black horse. (Note: Tolkien 1954a, book 1, ch. 2 "The Shadow of the Past") (Note: Tolkien 1954a, book 2, ch. 2 "The Council of Elrond") (Note: Tolkien 1954a book 1, ch. 3 "Three is Company") (Note: Tolkien 1954a book 1, ch. 4 "A Short Cut to Mushrooms") At Weathertop, the Witch-king stabs Frodo, the bearer of the One Ring, in the shoulder with the Morgul-knife, breaking off a piece of it in the Hobbit's flesh. (Note: Tolkien 1954a book 1, ch. 11 "A Knife in the Dark") Frodo is able to see that the Witch-king is taller than the other Nazgûl, with "long and gleaming" hair and a crown on his helmet. The Witch-king and the other Nazgûl are swept away by the waters of the river Bruinen. Their horses are drowned and they return to Mordor, (Note: Tolkien 1954a book 1, ch. 12 "Flight to the Ford") to return mounted on hideous flying beasts. (Note: Tolkien 1955, book 5, ch. 6, "The Battle of the Pelennor Fields") (Note: Carpenter 2023, #211 to Rhona Beare, 14 October 1958)

During the Battle of the Pelennor Fields, the Witch-king commands Grond, a battering-ram engraved with evil spells, to break the gates of Minas Tirith. Being forced to leave the broken gates he retreats to lead the besieging army against the new threat of the Rohirrim, where he is faced by a single warrior, Dernhelm, actually a disguised Éowyn, a noblewoman of Rohan; and not far away, Merry, a hobbit of the Fellowship. Éowyn boldly calls the Nazgûl a "dwimmerlaik", telling him to go if he was not deathless. (Note: "Dwimmerlaik" represents a word in Rohirric, the speech of Rohan, supposedly translated into Old English; Tolkien glosses it in the index as a "work of necromancy", a "spectre". It derives from Old English (ge)dwimor, "phantom, illusion" and -leikr, the Old Norse ending corresponding to Anglo-Saxon -lac, meaning "a state or act". (Note: Tolkien 1990, p. 372) Tom Shippey writes that Tolkien borrowed the word from a Middle English poem, Layamon's Brut.) He casts back his hood to reveal a crown, but the head that wears it is invisible. Merry's surreptitious stroke with an enchanted Barrow-blade brings the Nazgûl to his knees, allowing Éowyn, the niece of Théoden, to drive her sword between his crown and mantle. Thus the Witch-king is destroyed by a woman and a Hobbit, fulfilling Glorfindel's prophecy. Both weapons that pierced him disintegrate, and both assailants are stricken by the Black Breath, which causes a cold paralysis, terror, and often death.

== Analysis ==
=== From Wizard to Witch-king ===
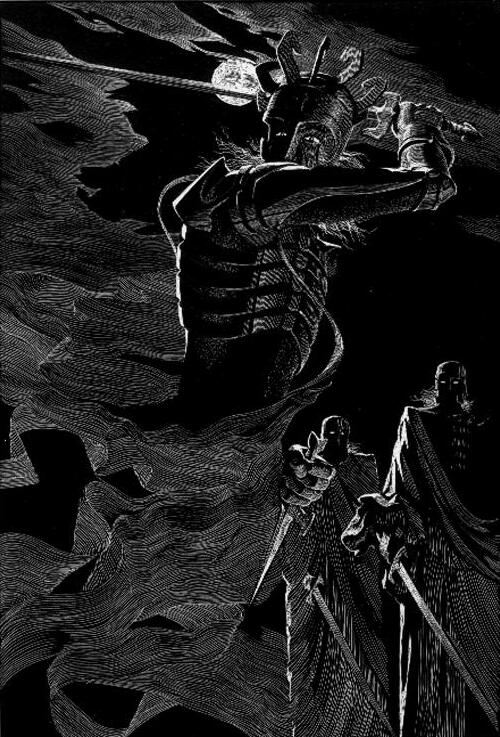
Scraperboard illustration of the Witch-king by Alexander Korotich, 1981

Megan N. Fontenot, on Tor.com, writes that in early drafts, Tolkien names him "the Wizard King", so powerful in wizardry that his opponent Gandalf is unable to counter him unaided. In early drafts of "The Council of Elrond", Gandalf explains that his enemy was "of old the greatest of all the wizards of Men". In a later draft, Tolkien adds that the Wizard King was also "a great king of old" and the "fell captain of the Nine [Riders]"; Fontenot glosses "fell" as implying "ravenous cruelty" and "ruthless ... savagery". (Note: Tolkien 1989, pp. 9, 116, 132, 149)

Later, in a draft of "The Siege of Gondor", Tolkien makes the Wizard King "a renegade of [Gandalf's] own order" from Númenor. In the manuscript of his notes for translators, Tolkien suggested that the Witch-king of Angmar was most likely of Númenórean origin. Fontenot comments that this could make him both a Maia rather than a Man, and originally one of the Istari, or, as she states, "something decidedly other". But Tolkien then reduces the Wizard King's power, so that Gandalf is able to tell Pippin as they wait for the attack on Gondor that "In him I am not overmatched", and that the Wizard King's main power is to inspire fear at a distance. At some stage, too, he renames the enemy the Witch-king; Fontenot suggests this was to distinguish more clearly between him and the Wizards like Gandalf and Saruman. Tolkien had thus explored making him a wizard (Istari or otherwise) or an immortal Maia, before settling on a "a human king whose lust for power got the better of his good judgment." She wonders what he might have been like before he accepted a Ring of Power from Sauron, noting that he was seemingly filled with "possessiveness, greed, lust, and a desire for dominance", all markers of evil in Tolkien's scheme of things. (Note: Tolkien 1990, pp. 326, 331)

=== Evil, the absence of good ===
In rode the Lord of the Nazgûl. A great black shape against the fires beyond he loomed up, grown to a vast menace of despair. In rode the Lord of the Nazgûl, under the archway that no enemy ever yet had passed, and all fled before his face.
All save one. There waiting, silent, and still in the space before the Gate, sat Gandalf upon Shadowfax: Shadowfax who alone among the free horses of the earth endured the terror, unmoving, steadfast as a graven image in Rath Dínen.
"You cannot enter here", said Gandalf, and the huge shadow halted. "Go back to the abyss prepared for you! Go back! Fall into the nothingness that awaits you and your Master. Go!"
The Black Rider flung back his hood, and behold! he had a kingly crown; and yet upon no head visible was it set. The red fires shone between it and the mantled shoulders vast and dark. From a mouth unseen there came a deadly laughter.
"Old fool!" he said. "Old fool! This is my hour. Do you not know Death when you see it? Die now and curse in vain!" And with that he lifted high his sword and flames ran down the blade...

— "The Siege of Gondor" (Note: Tolkien 1955, book 5, ch. 4, "The Siege of Gondor")

The Tolkien scholar Tom Shippey writes that the Lord of the Nazgûl hovers close to being an abstraction, "a vast menace of despair ... a huge shadow", actually calling himself Death: "Old fool! This is my hour. Do you not know Death when you see it?" The scene forms, too, a picture of the "unexistence of evil", based on the Boethian philosophy that God is all-powerful, so evil is not the equal and opposite of good, but simply its absence: he forms "a huge shadow".

The theologian George Hunsinger compares Tolkien's depiction of the Witch-king to the theologian Karl Barth's analysis of evil. Barth's conception is embodied in his term das Nichtige, "nothingness", which Hunsinger glosses as "something dynamic and sinister ... an active cosmic power, a power of destruction, a power of chaos, negation, and ruin." The power of das Nichtige is both "outwardly repulsive" and in Barth's words "intrinsically evil"; it can be described but not explained, and is defeated by God; it is wholly evil and serves no good purpose. It is both fearful and empty.

Hunsinger states that Tolkien's account of the Witch-king as he confronts Gandalf at the gate of Minas Tirith "captures something of Barth's notion of das Nichtige." He finds it especially relevant that the Witch-king is "above all ... actual and yet empty at the same time", and comments that Tolkiens "dead but undead Black Rider is as good a symbol as any ... for Barth's impossible possibility."

Similarly, Hunsinger finds Tolkien's description of how Éowyn kills the Witch-king "an image for the paradox of evil as something powerful and yet hollow at the same time." He notes that her sword shatters with her final stroke, but of her defeated foe, "nothing is left" in the empty mantle and hauberk.

The Episcopal priest and theologian Fleming Rutledge writes that whereas the "pale king", the invisible Witch-king of Angmar, is striving to kill Frodo, the real king, Aragorn, who has been out of sight, in disguise as a Ranger, is doing all he can to heal him: the two kings are opposites. She writes also that while the enemy visible to Gondor is the Men of Harad and the Easterlings, the real enemy is personified by the Witch-king.

Fleming Rutledge's comparison of the Witch-king and Aragorn
Character	Kingship	Goal	Visibility
Witch-king	Was King of Angmar	To kill the ring-bearer Frodo	Actually invisible
Aragorn	Has claim to be King of Gondor	To heal Frodo	Has been out of sight as a Ranger

=== Prophecy both true and false ===
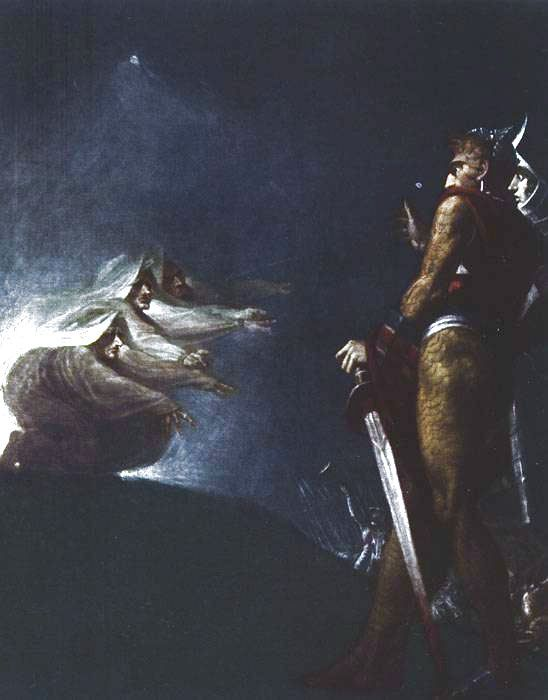
Tolkien's use of prophecy about the Witch-king's death parallels Shakespeare's, where the witches speak both truth and falsehood about Macbeth's death. Painting by Henry Fuseli

Julaire Andelin, in The J. R. R. Tolkien Encyclopedia, writes that prophecy in Middle-earth depended on characters' understanding of the Music of the Ainur, the divine plan for Arda, and was often ambiguous. Thus, Glorfindel's prophecy "not by the hand of Man will [the Lord of the Nazgûl] fall" did not lead the Lord of the Nazgûl to suppose that he would die at the hands of a woman and a hobbit.

Shippey states that the prophecy, and the Witch-king's surprise at finding Dernhelm to be a woman, parallel the witches' statement to Macbeth in Shakespeare's play of that name that he may "laugh to scorn / The power of man, for none of woman born / Shall harm Macbeth" (Act 4, scene 1), and Macbeth's shock at learning that Macduff "was from his mother's womb / Untimely ripp'd" (Act 5, scene 8), as Macduff was born by Caesarean section. Thus, Shippey notes, despite Tolkien's stated dislike of Shakespeare's treatment of myth, he read Macbeth closely.

The Tolkien scholar Michael Drout identifies a further parallel with Shakespeare, one of several allusions to King Lear in The Lord of the Rings. The Witch-king says "Come not between the Nazgûl and his prey", as the mad Lear says "Come not between the dragon and his wrath".

== Adaptations ==
In Peter Jackson's 2001–2003 The Lord of the Rings film trilogy, during the siege of Minas Tirith, the Witch-king wears a distinctive helmet over his hood resembling a mask and a crown, rather than the crown worn underneath his hood in the book. The Witch-king's mount is largely responsible for the death of Théoden and his horse Snowmane, a departure from the book. As confirmed in the films' audio commentary, the design of the monsters was based largely on illustrations by John Howe.

In the first film of Jackson's 2012–2014 The Hobbit film trilogy, the Wizard Radagast briefly encounters the Witch-king while investigating the forest fortress of Dol Guldur.

Péter Kristóf Makai, in A Companion to J. R. R. Tolkien, writes that the 1976 board game Middle Earth provided the Witch-king with a choice of nine spells, against Gandalf's eleven. Some of these were shared, such as the ability to project a defensive lightning-bolt.
