= Patience is a virtue =

"Patience is a virtue" is a proverbial phrase referring to one of the seven heavenly virtues typically said to date back to Psychomachia, an epic poem written in the fifth century.

Patience is a virtue may also refer to:

- "Patience Is a Virtue", a 1991 single by Lois Reeves, part of the Motorcity Records singles discography
- "Patience is a Virtue", a bonus track on some versions of the 2009 album Release the Stars by Rufus Wainwright
- Patience Is a Virtue, a 2010 mixtape from Romeo Miller's discography
