= Any port in a storm =

English proverb

"Any port in a storm" lithograph 1884 (Currier and Ives)

Any port in a storm is a proverb that loosely means that when someone is in trouble they cannot wait for the perfect solution. The phrase has been used in popular culture and politics since at least 1749. The original meaning of this nautical phrase was that a ship at sea in rough weather had no choice of harbor for shelter.

== Etymology ==
The first known publication of the phrase was in a 1749 erotic novel: John Cleland's Fanny Hill: Memoirs of a Woman of Pleasure. The phrase, "Pooh!", says he "my dear, any port in a storm." The phrase "any port in a storm" was used to describe a private theatrical play hosted by Lord Eldon in 1809: it was reported in the Augusta Columbian Centinel. In 1841, the phrase became a political slogan for the Whig Party's Winfield Scott as a candidate for US president when party members were opposed to Henry Clay they said, "Give us any port in a storm." In 1908, the phrase appeared in a popular song composed by Kerry Mills and Arthur J. Lamb entitled "Any Old Port in a Storm".

== Maritime law ==
It is widely believed that international maritime law allows mariners in distress to "lawfully seek shelter in the closest harbor, regardless of nationality". However, it is not clear that such a doctrine exists.

== Popular culture ==
The metaphor is widely used, as in an episode of The Wire, "Port in a Storm,” and by the main character of Good Will Hunting who references the phrase at a pivotal moment in the film. It is sometimes a play on words with port wine, as in an episode of Columbo. The variant "not just any port in a storm" has been used in a variety of contexts, including in reference to port wine.

== See also ==
- List of proverbial phrases
