= Give a dog a bad name and hang him =

Proverb

Chapter 13 of Dickens' Our Mutual Friend is called "Give a dog a bad name and hang him" because it recounts how Mr. Riah suffers an ill reputation as a money-lender, even though he is forced to be harsh by the proprietor, Fascination Fledgeby. Here, Mr Riah is scolded by Jenny Wren, "You are the Wolf in the Forest, the wicked Wolf!"

Give a dog a bad name and hang him is an English proverb. Its meaning is that if a person's reputation has been besmirched, then they will suffer difficulty and hardship. A similar proverb is he that has an ill name is half hanged.

The proverb dates back to the 18th century or before. In 1706, John Stevens recorded it as "Give a Dog an ill name and his work is done". In 1721, James Kelly had it as a Scottish proverb – "Give a Dog an ill Name, and he'll soon be hanged. Spoken of those who raise an ill Name on a Man on purpose to prevent his Advancement." In Virginia, it appeared as an old saying in the Norfolk Herald in 1803 – "give a dog a bad name and hang him".

The observation is due to negativity bias – that people are apt to think poorly of others on weak evidence. This is then reinforced by confirmation bias as people give more weight to evidence that supports a preconception than evidence which contradicts it.

== See also ==
- Character assassination
- Scapegoat
