= Even a worm will turn =

Idiom

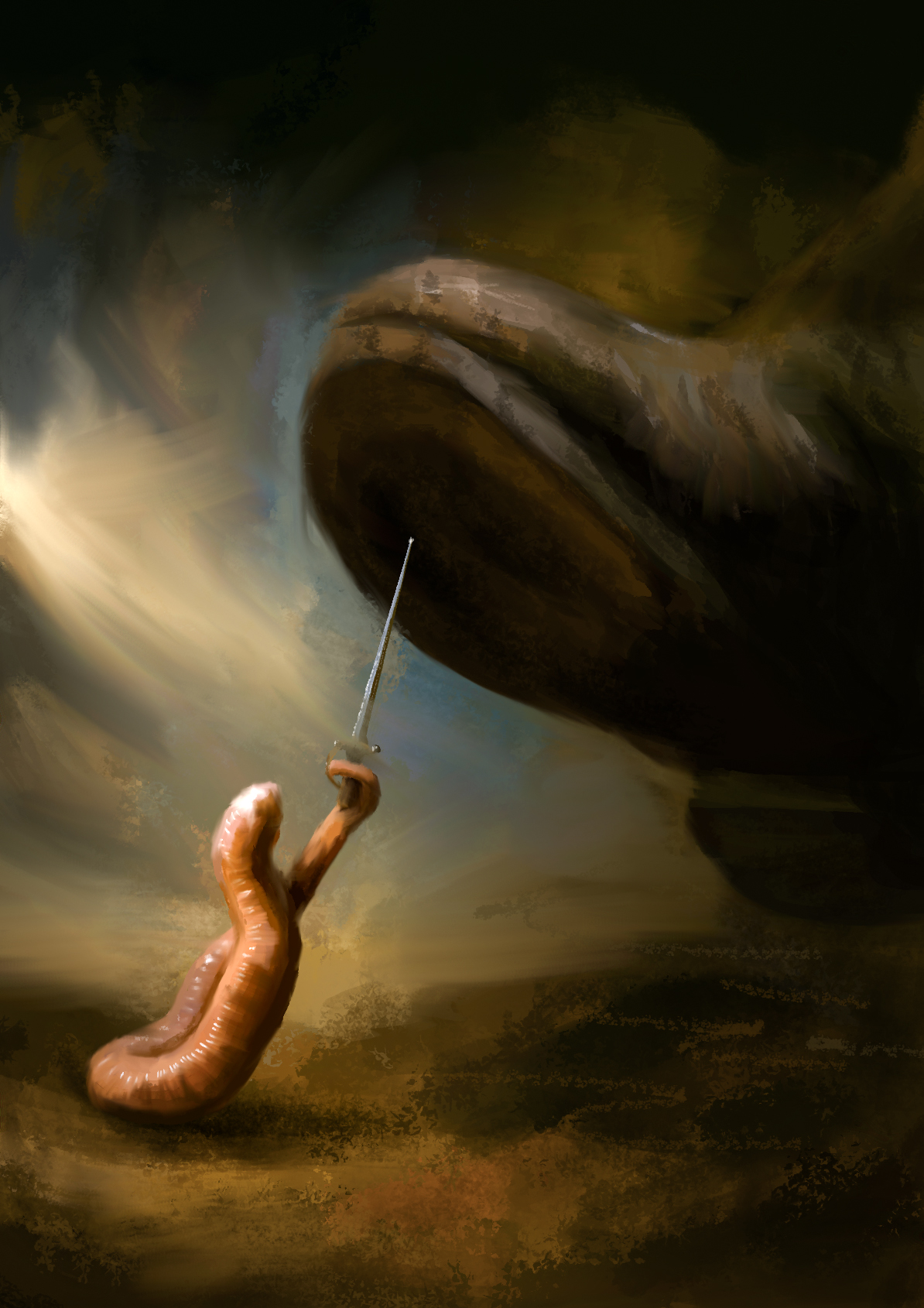
Even The Worm Turned, digital painting by Teddy Westside, 2026

"Even a worm will turn" is an English language expression used to convey the message that even the meekest or most docile of creatures (such as a worm) will retaliate or seek revenge if pushed too far. The phrase was first recorded in a 1546 collection of proverbs by John Heywood, in the form "Treade a worme on the tayle, and it must turne agayne." At the time “agayne” also meant “against” or “oppose”.

== History ==
The phrase was used in William Shakespeare's play Henry VI, Part 3 (Act 2, Scene 2). In the play, it is uttered by Lord Clifford, killer of Rutland as:

To whom do lions cast their gentle looks?
Not to the beast that would usurp their den.
The smallest worm will turn being trodden on,
And doves will peck in safeguard of their brood.

It has been proposed that this passage from Henry VI was suggested by one in a history by Edward Halle. In that book the Earl of Warwick makes a speech that includes the passage:

What worme is touched, and will not once turne agayn? What beast is striken, that will not rore or sound? What innocet child is hurt that will not crye? If the poore and unreasonable beastes: If the sely babes that lacketh discrecion, grone agaynst harme to theim proffered, How ought an honest man to be angery, when thinges that touche his honestie be daily agaynst him attempted.

In 1641, the following passage in a letter from Edmund Verney to his son Ralph Verney further confirms the proverb's meaning that small affronts can lead to rebellion.

The horse have sent theire peremptory answere that they will not muster till they are payde; if the foote doe the lyke, beleeve me it can tend to noe lesse than a generall mutiny. A worme will turne agayne if it be trod on.

The proverb is also found in other countries and languages.

== France ==
In 1694 the 1st edition of the Dictionnaire de l’Académie française included the proverb with an explanation:

Un ver de terre se rebecque bien quand on marche dessus,
pour dire, qu’Il n’est point d’homme si foible & si chetif, qu’il n’ait quelque ressentiment quand on l’offense.

In English (per Google translate 2025) "An earthworm shrivels up when you step on it,' [that is] to say that there is no man so weak and puny that he does not feel some resentment when he is offended." However, in 1694 se rebe(c)quer implied more rebel than shrivel.

Earlier in 1592 the proverb appeared in the poem Plainte de l’Autheur durant une sienne longue maladie by Philippes Des Portes. The verse with a translation is shown below:

| French | English |
|---|---|---|
| Le ver avorton de la terre | The worm castling of the earth* | (*see spontaneous generation) |
| Se rebecque alors qu’on le serre, | Resists when [op]pressed |
| Poussé d’un naturel devoir: | It is an instinctive reflex: |
| Et moy pourtraict de ton image, | Now picture me in your place, |
| Quand ton pié me foule & m’outrage | When your foot steps on me & offends me |
| N’oserois-je un peu m’esmouvoir? | Would I not dare to stir a little? |

== Germany ==
In German the expression is: Auch der Wurm krümmt sich, wenn er getreten wird. .

In 1782, in his dictionary of German proverbs, Joachim Blum gave the meaning as:

The writhing, twisting, screaming of the worm or animal in general can be partly an expression of the pain it feels and partly of its inability to resist the insult to which it must submit.
The poor, defenseless person is oppressed only so long, until he, in his pain, resists the abuse.
The trampled worm writhes; shouldn't a man do much more ? Should he feel oppressed and not speak out?

The earliest surviving record in German is from 1541 in a book of proverbs by Sebastian Franck . Franck recorded three versions of the proverb and listed them under Latin sayings expressing similar ideas.

| German | Latin | Latin to English |
|---|---|---|
| Wan man ein wurm lang trit / so krümpt er sich. | Furor fit laesa saepius patientia. | Patience tried can turn to fury |
| Wan man ein wurm trit / so krumpt er sich. | Inest & formicae bilis. | There is bile in the ant too |
| Man trit ein wurm so lang / bis er sich krümt | (Latin indecipherable) |

German writers who used the expression include Goethe, Schopenhauer and Nietzsche.
