= Don't judge a book by its cover =

English metaphorical phrase

The English idiom "don't judge a book by its cover", also known as "never judge a book by its cover", is a metaphorical phrase that means one should not judge the worth or value of something or someone by their outward appearance alone. For example, "That man may look very small and insignificant, but don't judge a book by its cover – he's a very powerful man in his circle".

== Early reference ==
- In George Eliot's The Mill on the Floss (1860), Mr. Tulliver uses the phrase in discussing Daniel Defoe's The History of the Devil, saying how it was beautifully bound.
- The phrase was popularized when it appeared in the 1946 murder mystery, Murder in the Glass Room, by Lester Fuller and Edwin Rolfe: “You can never tell a book by its cover.”

== See also ==
- All that glitters is not gold
- Face value
- Prima facie
