= Nature does not do anything in vain =

Nature does not do anything in vain (Ancient Greek: ἡ φύσις οὐδὲν ποιεῖ μάτην hē phúsis oudèn poieî mátēn; Latin: natura nihil fascit frustra) is a proverb and a physical and metaphysical thesis by the Greek philosopher Aristotle.

Aristotle, the author of the quote 'Nature does not do anything in vain'.

== Concept ==
=== Local and Relative Teleology ===
The investigation of nature is one of the central themes of Aristotle's work. Nature does nothing in vain because it takes into account the possibilities (ἐκ τῶν ἐνδεχομένων, ek tôn endekhoménōn) which define the arrangement of the parts within the natural universe. Nature operates according to a principle of economy and only gives each person what is useful for their fulfillment. This does not mean, however, that nature always reaches its end, for a finalized process does not inevitably succeed.

This doctrine, finalist, should not be understood as a cosmic teleology. Aristotle does not maintain that nature always does the best cosmic thing, but rather that nature goes in the direction of the best on the scale of the possibilities specific to each being.

=== Natural Production and Divine Production ===
Nature is not identified, in Aristotle, with divine or supernatural production. It is eternal, and the universe is uncreated, eternal. However, exceptionally, in the treatise On the Heavens, Aristotle brings together divine production and natural production by writing that "God and nature do nothing in vain". According to Simplicius, it means that nature provides from below a disposition which has an end in view, which God illuminates from above.

=== Occurrences ===
He expounds on his theory of nature in various works, from Physics to Metaphysics, including On the Movement of Animals. In the eighth chapter of this book, Aristotle writes that "nature does nothing in vain, but always aims for the best for each being within the limits of possibilities, preserving the proper substance, that is to say, the very essence of each one". In the Parts of Animals, he writes a variant: "nature does nothing superfluous" (book IV), as well as "nature does nothing in vain, nor anything superfluous". The proverb is present from the first book of Politics, where Aristotle applies it to the city, which he considers to be among the things of nature. The usual formulation of the expression is "ἡ φύσις οὐδὲν ποιεῖ μάτην"

== Legacy ==
=== Ancient Philosophies and Adaptation ===
Post-Aristotle ancient philosophy is no stranger to the Stagirite's thesis. Alexander of Aphrodisias, a commentator on Aristotle, repeats the wording word for word in his treatise On the Soul. The Stoics reuse the thesis, but modify it to apply it more precisely to their cosmology. In the first century, Heron of Alexandria reused the phrase without modification.

=== Scholasticism and the Divinization of Nature ===
Scholasticism and Christian theology used the Aristotelian thesis to introduce an additional divine element, which was not evident in Aristotle's writings. Thomas Aquinas thus writes that "Nature, according to God, does nothing useless, and nothing without reason", in the General Conception of the Christian School. In 1604, Pierre Crespet still takes this for granted, writing that

there is no dialectician or philosopher so small who does not take it for granted that God and nature do nothing in vain. But if the Atheists do not want to recognize God, they must, with their leader Pliny, recognize nature. Now nature therefore does nothing in vain.

Jacques-Bénigne Bossuet fully accepts this thesis, writing in the Treatise on the Knowledge of God and Oneself:

We thus see that the philosophers who have best observed nature have given us the maxim that it does nothing in vain, and that it always achieves its ends by the shortest and easiest means.

=== Baruch Spinoza and the Critique of Finalism ===
Baruch Spinoza is very critical, in his Ethics, of the Aristotelian thesis of the finality of nature. He takes up the proverb to criticize it, and writes about the supporters of this theory that

while they sought to demonstrate that Nature does nothing in vain (that is to say, nothing that is not for the use of men), they seem above all to have proven nothing other than the fact that Nature and the Gods are delirious as well as men [...] Nature does not have any end that would have been fixed before itself [...] and all final causes are nothing other than human fictions.

=== Immanuel Kant and Generalization to the Species ===
In his Idea of a Universal History from a Cosmopolitan Point of View, Immanuel Kant argues that, although nature does nothing in vain, it is realized in the entire human species, because individual men are too ephemeral to allow for full development. He directly quotes the maxim when he writes that

Nature has willed that man should derive entirely from himself everything that transcends the mechanical arrangement of his animal existence, and that he should participate in no other happiness or perfection than that which he has created for himself, independently of instinct by his own reason. Indeed, nature does nothing in vain, and she is not prodigal in the use of means to achieve her ends.

In an 1864 essay, Charles Pellarin specifically criticizes this postulate, writing:

This foundation [on which Kant bases himself] is none other than a metaphysical principle, namely that nature does nothing in vain, and that, just as human faculties do not develop in the individual, which is ephemeral, they must develop in the species, which is enduring. I have no need to tell minds nourished by positive doctrines that we in no way know whether nature wills or does not will something in vain. This is a subjective view unduly transported into the objective domain.

== Criticism ==
=== Scientific Criticism ===
Advances in modern science have allowed for the gradual abandonment of Aristotle's finalist thesis. By the 19th century, medicine was no longer using this principle in its analyses. Thus, in 1864, Georg Ernst Stahl wrote in his Medico-Philosophical and Practical Works:

The small number of those who deny this, for their part, rely on this argument, which is initially dubious and, in its second part, unacceptable: God and nature do nothing in vain.

=== Philosophical Criticism ===
During this same 19th century, several philosophers attacked the teleology of nature and the personification of nature. This is the case with positivist school, which considers it necessary to overthrow the metaphysical conception of nature as a personified abstraction.
