= All that glitters is not gold =

Well-known saying

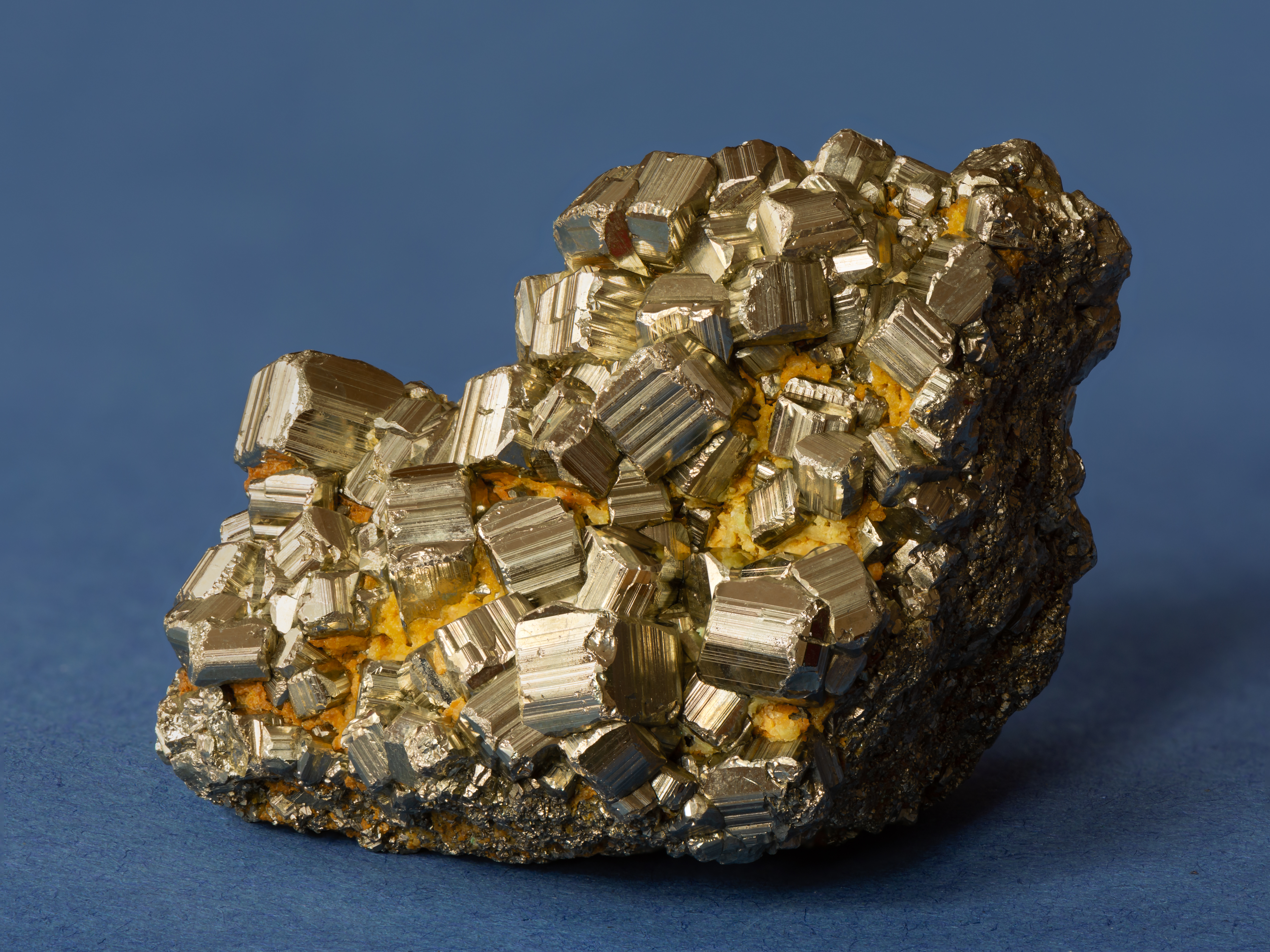
Upon first glance, pyrite (fool's gold) appears to be gold

"All that glitters is not gold" is an aphorism stating that not everything that looks precious or true turns out to be so.

While early expressions of the idea are known from at least the 12th century, the current saying is derived from a line in William Shakespeare's Merchant of Venice (c. 1596–1598), "All that glisters is not gold", which is likely to have been borrowed from a proverb by John Florio.

== Origins ==
The expression, in various forms, originated in or before the 12th century possibly inspired by Aesop's Fables "The Goose that Laid the Golden Eggs" and "The Miser and his Gold". The Latin is Non omne quod nitet aurum est. The French monk Alain de Lille wrote "Do not hold everything gold that shines like gold" in 1175.

Chaucer gave two early versions in English: "But al thyng which that shyneth as the gold / Nis nat gold, as that I have herd it told" in "The Canon's Yeoman's Tale", and "Hyt is not al golde that glareth" in "The House of Fame". John Heywood, writing a compilation of proverbial wisdom in 1546, included a line, "All is not golde that glisters by tolde tales". Arthur Golding, in his 1577 English translation of John Calvin's sermons on the Epistle to the Ephesians, used the phrase "But al is not gold that glistereth".

The popular form of the expression is derived from William Shakespeare's The Merchant of Venice (c. 1596–1598), which may have been inspired by a very similar proverb in John Florio's Firste Fruites (1578): "Al that glistreth is not gold." This was likely borrowed by Shakespeare, who used several of Florio's sayings in his plays. Like other versions of the phrase from the time, it uses the word "glisters", a 16th-century synonym for "glitters". In The Merchant of Venice, the line comes from a secondary plot of the play, in which Portia's suitors must choose between three caskets (gold, silver, and lead); the Prince of Morocco incorrectly chooses the golden casket, which contains a scroll that says:

All that glisters is not gold—
Often have you heard that told.
Many a man his life hath sold
But my outside to behold.
Gilded tombs do worms enfold.
Had you been as wise as bold,
Young in limbs, in judgment old,
Your answer had not been inscrolled
Fare you well. Your suit is cold—

— William Shakespeare, The Merchant of Venice, Act II Scene 7

== Glitters or glisters ==
The original version of the saying used the word glisters, though it is often taken as the similar and synonymous glitters. The poet John Dryden used glitter in his 1687 poem The Hind and the Panther.

In 1747, Thomas Gray paraphrased the saying in his "Ode on the Death of a Favourite Cat, Drowned in a Tub of Gold Fishes", which finishes with the lines:

Not all that tempts your wandering eyes
And heedless hearts, is lawful prize;
Nor all that glisters, gold.

== In popular culture ==
=== Early uses ===
In H.M.S. Pinafore, an 1878 comic opera by Gilbert and Sullivan, the phrase appears in the song "Things Are Seldom What They Seem", where Little Buttercup alludes to Captain Corcoran's low birth by singing of things that may appear as one thing whilst being another, including the line "all that glitters is not gold".

All That Glitters Is Not Gold (1901).

In 1901, the sheet music publishers M. Witmark & Sons released "All That Glitters Is Not Gold", featuring words by George A. Norton and music by James W. Casey. Despite the title, the first reference in the lyrics is "all is not gold that glitters". The song is perhaps best remembered today for its inclusion in Bowery Bugs (1949), a Bugs Bunny cartoon based on the story of the Brooklyn Bridge jump claimant Steve Brodie.

"All is not gold that glitters" phrase is in the O. Henry 1910 story The Gold That Glittered. All Is Not Gold That Glitters (1917) is a Krazy Kat animated cartoon.

In 1946, a different song, also by the name "All That Glitters Is Not Gold", was released by Decca Records. That song was written by Alice Cornett, Eddie Asherman, and Lee Kuhn, and recorded by Jimmy Dorsey and his orchestra. The song was subsequently covered by several other artists.

=== Tolkien ===
The phrase is referenced with a reversal of the usual meaning in J. R. R. Tolkien's poem "The Riddle of Strider", originally written for The Fellowship of the Ring:

All that is gold does not glitter,
Not all those who wander are lost;
The old that is strong does not wither,
Deep roots are not reached by the frost.

From the ashes a fire shall be woken,
A light from the shadows shall spring;
Renewed shall be blade that was broken,
The crownless again shall be king.

— J. R. R. Tolkien, "The Riddle of Strider", The Lord of the Rings: The Fellowship of the Ring

The poem emphasizes that sometimes gold is hidden or mistaken for something else, as opposed to gaudy facades being mistaken for real gold. Strider, secretly the rightful king of Gondor, appears to be a mere Ranger. Both Tolkien's phrase and the original ask the reader to look beneath the skin, rather than judging on outward appearance.

=== Popular music ===
- Led Zeppelin reference the phrase in the opening line of their 1971 hit "Stairway to Heaven": "There's a lady who's sure all that glitters is gold".
- Neil Young used the phrase in his song "Don't Be Denied" ("Well, all that glitters isn't gold/I know you've heard that story told"), from his 1973 album Time Fades Away, to express his "realization that even success wouldn't make him happy", even after he obtained fame and money.
- In the 1973 single "Get Up, Stand Up" by the Wailers, Bob Marley and Peter Tosh used the phrase in the first verse to reflect the themes of the song – namely the critiques of colonialism and Christianity, and their roles in creating a feeling of resignation among the African diaspora contrary to their values and beliefs:

Preacher man don't tell me heaven is under the earth,
I know you don't know what life is really worth,
It's not all that glitter is gold,
Half the story has never been told,
So now you see the light,
Stand up for your right.

— Bob Marley, "Get Up, Stand Up"

- Larry Gatlin & the Gatlin Brothers released "All the Gold in California" in 1979, which was a song about the dangers of chasing stardom in Hollywood and its make-or-break risk of failure.

Trying to be a hero
Winding up a zero
Can scar a man forever
Right down to his soul
Living in the spotlight
Can kill a man outright
For everything that glitters
Is not gold

— Larry Gatlin, "All the Gold In California"

- Dan Seals released a 1986 single "Everything That Glitters (Is Not Gold)", co-written by Bob McDill. The song contrasts the fashion and fame of a rodeo queen against their treatment of their family.

But, oh, sometimes I think about you
And the way you used to ride out
In your rhinestones and your sequins
With the sunlight on your hair
And, oh, the crowd will always love you
But, as for me, I've come to know
Everything that glitters is not gold

— Dan Seals & Bob McDill, "Everything That Glitters (Is Not Gold)"

- The 1995 song "Gold" by Prince has the refrain "All that glitters ain't gold."
- A deviation from the phrase can be found in the song "Posthuman" by Marilyn Manson, released on the 1998 album Mechanical Animals, whose lyrics include the line "All that glitters is cold."
- Rock band Smash Mouth used the version, "All that glitters is gold", in their 1999 song, "All Star".
- Kanye West also used the saying in his 2004 song "Family Business".
- Aloe Blacc's 2010 song "I Need a Dollar" has the line "all that glitters ain't gold".
- Rock band Biffy Clyro also use the saying in the lyrics to their 2013 single "Biblical": "I know how it looks but all that glitters ain't gold."
- The 2018 song "The House Always Wins" by the Stupendium includes "All that glitters isn't golden" in its refrain.
- Progressive rock band Karmakanic released a song called "All That Glitters Is Not Gold" on their album Transmutation in 2025.

==== TV Shows ====
- "All That Glitters", season 4, episode 12 of the Nickelodeon cartoon SpongeBob SquarePants originally aired June 2nd, 2006. In the episode, SpongeBob breaks his trusty spatula trying to flip a Monster Krabby Patty, sending the spatula to the hospital. He is forced to find a replacement spatula and is dazzled by an expensive modern spatula in which he sells everything he owns to get. His original spatula recovers but turns away from SpongeBob due to his betrayal. SpongeBob cries and apologizes for his weakness. A narrator SpongeBob appears into frame and says plainly to the audience, "All that glitters is not gold." In the end, the spatula forgives SpongeBob and they are back to flipping patties.

== See also ==
- "Gods of the Copybook Headings" – a poem reflecting on eternal truths amid human pretensions, by Rudyard Kipling
- List of idioms attributed to Shakespeare
