= Shakespeare's influence on Tolkien =

Effect on Tolkien's legendarium

J. R. R. Tolkien derived the characters, stories, places, and languages of Middle-earth from many sources. Shakespeare's influence on Tolkien was substantial, despite Tolkien's professed dislike of the playwright. Tolkien disapproved in particular of Shakespeare's devaluation of elves, and was deeply disappointed by the prosaic explanation of how Birnam Wood came to Dunsinane Hill in Macbeth. Tolkien was influenced especially by Macbeth and A Midsummer Night's Dream, and he used King Lear for "issues of kingship, madness, and succession". He arguably drew on several other plays, including The Merchant of Venice, Henry IV, Part 1, and Love's Labour's Lost, as well as Shakespeare's poetry, for numerous effects in his Middle-earth writings. The Tolkien scholar Tom Shippey suggests that Tolkien may even have felt a kind of fellow-feeling with Shakespeare, as both men were rooted in the county of Warwickshire.

== Shakespeare as a source ==
=== Tolkien's dislike of Shakespeare ===
J. R. R. Tolkien, a philologist and medievalist as well as a fantasy author, recorded that he disliked William Shakespeare's work. In a letter, he wrote of his "bitter disappointment and disgust from schooldays of the shabby use made in Shakespeare [in Macbeth] of the coming of 'Great Birnam wood to high Dunsinane hill'". (Note: Carpenter 2023, #163 to W. H. Auden, 7 June 1955) He attributed his creation of a world containing tree-giants or Ents to this reaction, writing "I longed to devise a setting in which the trees might really march to war."

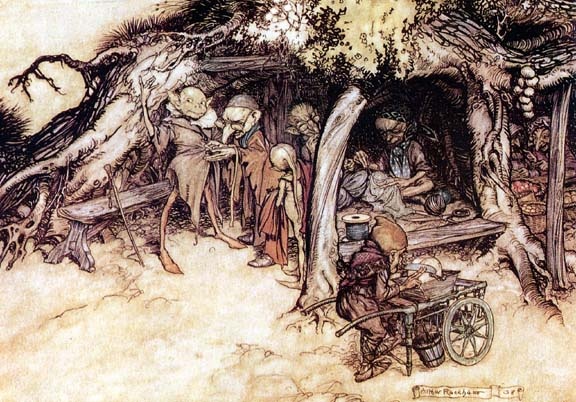
Tolkien regretted Shakespeare's "disastrous debasement" of "Elves". (Note: Carpenter 2023, #151 to Hugh Brogan, 18 September 1954) By the early 20th century, an artist like Arthur Rackham could depict Elves as miniature figures, as in this illustration "To make my small elves coats" for A Midsummer Night's Dream.

In another letter, Tolkien wrote that "I now deeply regret having used [the term] Elves, though this is a word in ancestry and original meaning suitable enough. But the disastrous debasement of this word, in which Shakespeare played an unforgiveable part, has really overloaded it with regrettable tones, which are too much to overcome."

The scholar of humanities Patrick Curry argues that what set Tolkien against Shakespeare was his "'denaturing' of Elves", his explaining away of their distinctive character. Curry was alluding to Angela Carter's analysis of the wood in A Midsummer Night's Dream. Shakespeare's wood is

the English wood ... nothing like the dark, necromantic forest in which the Northern European imagination begins and ends, where its dead and the witches live ... an English wood, however marvellous, however metamorphic, cannot, by definition, be trackless ... But to be lost in the forest is to be lost to this world, to be abandoned by the light, to lose yourself utterly, an existential catastrophe

Curry states that Middle-earth is exactly not like that "English wood". He quotes Carter's explanation that "Nineteenth-century nostalgia disinfected the wood, cleansing it of the grave, hideous and elemental beings with which the superstition of an earlier age had filled it. Or rather, denaturing those beings until they came to look like those photographs of fairy folk that so enraptured Conan Doyle."

Tolkien, in other words, wanted Middle-earth to be full of the supernatural, with trackless woods such as Mirkwood full of powerful beings, such as Elves. In Curry's view, such a world has restored to it "the same sense of wonder that Keats experienced upon encountering Chapman's Homer", reconnecting to the ancient but living tradition of an almost forgotten England.

=== Tolkien's interest in Shakespeare ===
In his essay On Fairy-Stories, Tolkien cites three of Shakespeare's works, namely A Midsummer Night's Dream, Macbeth, and King Lear, as of interest to the question of what a fairy-story actually is.

Both Macbeth and King Lear are tragedies that involve the supernatural as a necessary part of the action: in John Beifuss's view, in each case "the natural order is overthrown [by supernatural characters, theme, or imagery] and the consequences of this upsetting spread over all the action of the play". The Tolkien scholar Michael Drout writes that while Tolkien's professed dislike of Shakespeare is well-known, he was certainly influenced by Macbeth and A Midsummer Night's Dream, and his use of King Lear for "issues of kingship, madness, and succession" was hardly surprising.

== Plays ==
=== King Lear ===
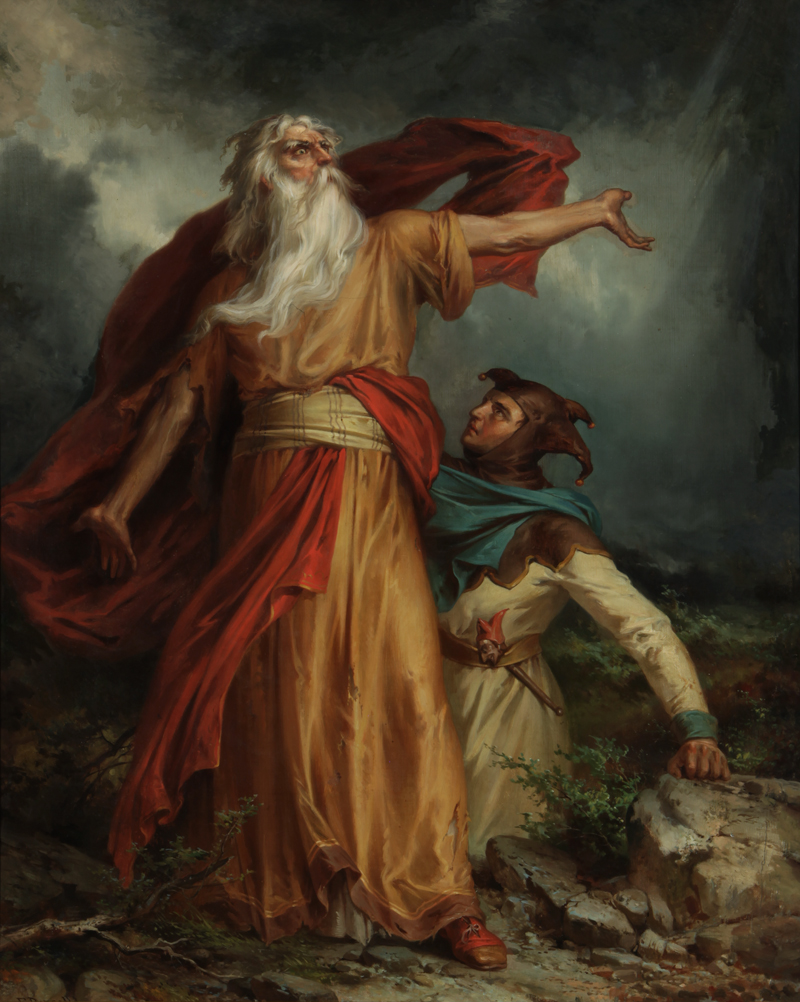
King Lear by George Frederick Bensell, before 1879

The Tolkien scholar Michael Drout argues that the section of The Return of the King in which war comes to the land of Gondor, and its kingship comes into question, has a series of literary connections with Shakespeare's King Lear. (Note: Tolkien 1955, book 5, chs. 4–8)

Michael Drout's analysis of The Return of the King's Shakespearean allusions
War comes to Gondor	King Lear	Drout's comments
The hobbit Merry and the noblewoman Éowyn fight the Lord of the Nazgûl. The Nazgûl says "Come not between the Nazgûl and his prey".	The mad Lear says "Come not between the dragon and his wrath".	
The Steward of Gondor, Denethor, calls his servants to help him burn himself and his heir Faramir to death with the words "Come if you are not all recreant!"	Lear calls Kent "recreant" for criticising Lear's handling of Cordelia.	Tolkien uses the word only this once.
Éomer, seeing Éowyn apparently lifeless on the ground, is enraged: "'Éowyn, Éowyn!' he cried at last: 'Éowyn, how come you here? What madness or devilry is this? Death, death, death! Death take us all!'"	Lear rages "And my poor fool is hanged! No, no, no life? / Why should a dog, a horse, a rat have life, / And thou no breath at all? Thou'lt come no more / Never, never, never, never, never!"	The passages share similar repetitions to express similar situations: loss of a female relative and madness.
Imrahil proves Éowyn is alive by holding "the bright-burnished vambrace that was upon his arm before her cold lips, and behold! a little mist was laid on it hardly to be seen".	Lear says "Lend me a looking glass; / If that her breath will mist or stain the stone, / Why, then she lives".	
Gandalf speaks of "Seven stars and seven stones / And one white tree".	Lear's fool speaks of "seven stars".	

Drout comments that while some of these comparisons are in themselves inconclusive, the overall pattern is strongly suggestive of Shakespearean influence on Tolkien's writing.

=== Macbeth ===
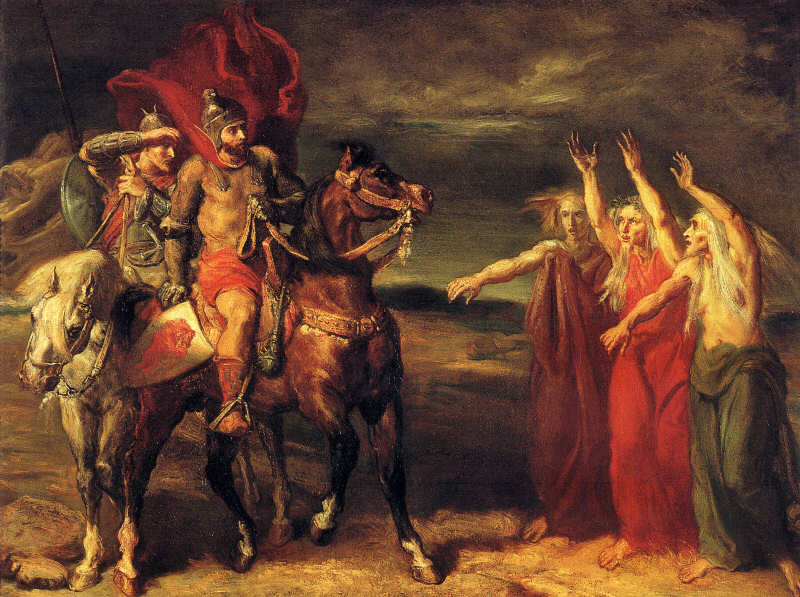
Macbeth and Banquo encounter the witches for the first time. Théodore Chassériau, 1855

The Tolkien scholar Tom Shippey comments that Tolkien transforms two of Shakespeare's motifs from Macbeth: the march of the Ents to destroy Isengard, recalling the coming of Birnam Wood to Dunsinane; and the prophesied killing of the Witch-king of Angmar, recalling the killing of Macbeth.

==== "Not by the hand of man" ====
In the Battle of the Pelennor Fields, Éowyn, a woman of the royal house of Rohan, confronts the Witch-King of Angmar, Lord of the Nazgûl. The Witch-King threatens that he will "bear thee away to the houses of lamentation, beyond all darkness, where thy flesh shall be devoured, and thy shrivelled mind be left naked to the Lidless Eye". He boasts "No living man may hinder me", (Note: Tolkien 1955, book 5, ch. 6 "The Battle of the Pelennor Fields") whereupon Éowyn laughs, removes her helmet, and declares:

But no living man am I! You look upon a woman. Éowyn I am, Éomund's daughter. You stand between me and my lord and kin. Begone, if you be not deathless! For living or dark undead, I will smite you, if you touch him.

The Nazgûl is surprised, but injures her with his first blow. Before he can strike again, the Hobbit Merry Brandybuck stabs him behind the knee with his ancient dagger from the Barrow-wight's hoard, made for this exact purpose. As the Nazgûl staggers forwards, Éowyn kills him with her sword. Julaire Andelin, writing in The J. R. R. Tolkien Encyclopedia, states that the Elf-lord Glorfindel's prophecy that "not by the hand of man will [the Lord of the Nazgûl] fall" did not lead the Lord of the Nazgûl to suppose that he would die at the hands of a woman and a Hobbit. (Note: Tolkien 1955, Appendix A, Gondor and the Heirs of Anárion")

Shippey states that the prophecy, and the Witch-king's surprise at finding Dernhelm to be a woman, parallel the witches' statement to Macbeth that he may "laugh to scorn / The power of man, for none of woman born / Shall harm Macbeth" (Act 4, scene 1), and Macbeth's shock at learning that Macduff "was from his mother's womb / Untimely ripp'd" (as Macduff was born by Caesarean section: Act 5, scene 8). Thus, Shippey argues, despite Tolkien's stated dislike of Shakespeare's treatment of myth, he read Macbeth closely.

==== Trees marching to war ====
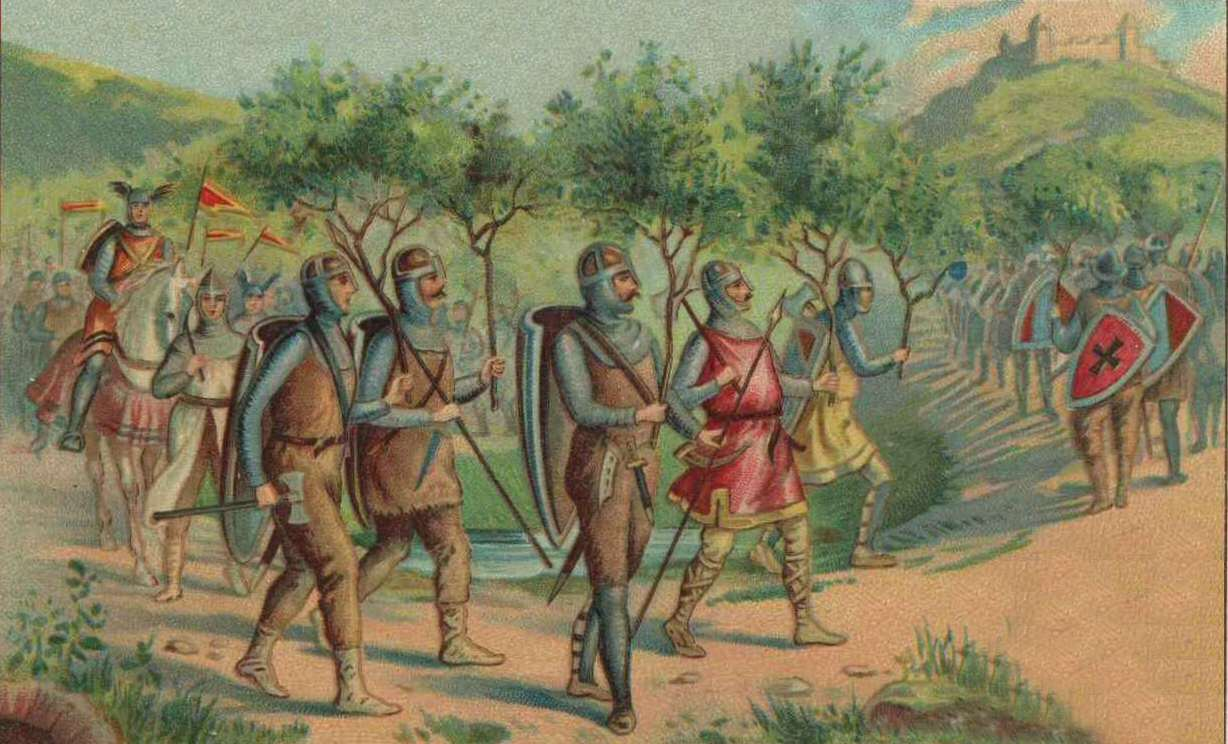
Birnam Wood comes to Dunsinane, in the form of branches carried by the soldiers, as described by Shakespeare. This was a prosaic resolution that Tolkien found deeply disappointing.

Tolkien found Shakespeare's solution to how Birnam Wood could come to Dunsinane to fulfil the prophecy in Macbeth bitterly disappointing: the soldiers cut branches which they carry with them, giving something of the appearance of a wood, with an entirely non-magical explanation. Shippey comments that Tolkien transformed Shakespeare's theme so that trees actually could march to war: he has Ents (tree-giants) and Huorns (partially awakened trees) join the fight against the evil Wizard Saruman. The Ents destroy Saruman's fortress of Isengard; (Note: Tolkien 1954, book 3, ch. 9 "Flotsam and Jetsam") the Huorns march as a forest to Rohan's fortress of Helm's Deep, besieged by Saruman's army of Orcs. The Orcs find themselves trapped between the Men of Rohan and the Huorns: they flee into the vengeful Huorn forest, never to emerge. (Note: Tolkien 1954, book 3, ch. 7 "Helm's Deep")

Tolkien's reworking of Macbeth's use of prophecy
Author	Prophecy	Apparent meaning	Prosaic resolution	Mythic/magical resolution
Shakespeare	No man born of woman shall harm Macbeth.	Macbeth will not die violently.	Macduff, delivered by Caesarean section not born naturally, kills Macbeth.	———
Tolkien	No man living shall hinder the Witch-King.	The Witch-King is immortal.	———	A Hobbit (with a magical dagger made exactly for this purpose) and a woman kill the Witch-King.
Shakespeare	Birnam Wood will come to Dunsinane.	Impossible, the battle will never happen.	Soldiers cut branches and carry them to battle, giving the appearance of a wood.	———
Tolkien	———	———	———	Huorns, partially awakened trees, march to battle and destroy their Orc enemies.

=== A Midsummer Night's Dream ===
==== The Hobbit ====
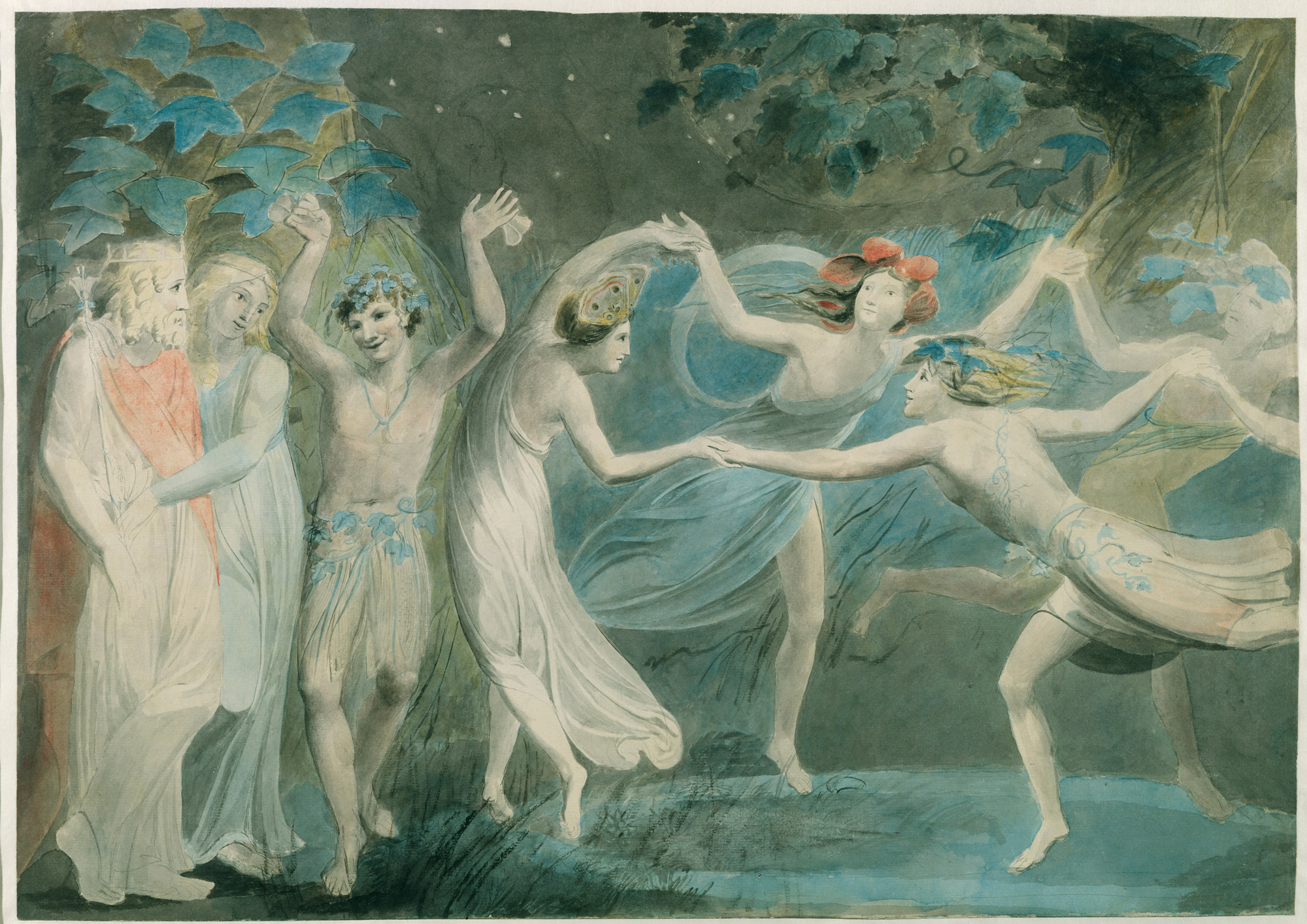
Oberon, Titania and Puck with Fairies Dancing in A Midsummer Night's Dream. William Blake, c.1786

Tolkien made use of A Midsummer Night's Dream repeatedly in The Hobbit. Lisa Hopkins, writing in Mallorn, writes that this contributes to the book's marked Englishness, along with features like the Shire and the character of its protagonist, Bilbo Baggins. Hopkins draws parallels between the way that the Wizard Gandalf acts as a benevolent but powerful guardian to Bilbo, and the way that Oberon watches over the young lovers in the play. Similarly, she likens the way Gandalf rescues Bilbo and the Dwarves from the Trolls by stirring them to argue amongst themselves, just as Shakespeare has Puck stir up an argument between Lysander and Demetrius (Act III, scene 2).

Hopkins further compares the transformations in the two works. Shakespeare's Bottom acquires an ass's head, while the tradition of having actors play multiple roles means that Theseus doubles as Oberon, and Hippolyta doubles as Titania. Tolkien's Beorn explicitly shape-shifts into the body of a bear, while Bilbo changes from being a timid follower to a capable leader.

Tolkien, like Shakespeare, spent his childhood in Warwickshire. The rural county influenced their work. Shippey suggests Tolkien may have felt some fellow-feeling with the playwright for their shared origins.

She compares, too, the play's wild wood, which has been read as symbolising the irrational and unconscious, with Tolkien's Mirkwood, which "surely ... functions on just such a symbolic level". She writes that Shakespeare's lovers find themselves in a hierarchy in the wood, above the six mechanicals but below the fairies; while Bilbo is above the intelligence and morality of the giant spiders, but below the Elves of the forest.

==== The Lord of the Rings ====
Rebecca-Anne Do Rozario suggests that in A Midsummer Night's Dream and The Lord of the Rings, both Shakespeare and Tolkien drew on their personal experience of living in the county of Warwickshire, creating the mechanicals and the Hobbits of the Shire respectively. Both groups are "ostensibly rustic", distinctively English, anachronistic given the eras in which the play and novel are set, and mediate between the magical world and the world of the reader. Shippey adds that the play's enchanted wood is "a model of sorts" for the Ents' Fangorn forest; just as The Tempest's protagonist, the sorcerer Prospero, could be for Gandalf's short temper.

== Poetry ==
Tolkien's "Riddle of Strider", a rhyme about Aragorn, (Note: Tolkien 1954a book 1, ch. 10 "Strider" and book 2, ch. 2 "The Council of Elrond") echoes a line of Shakespeare's from The Merchant of Venice (Act II, scene 7). Judith Kollman writes that Tolkien has inverted Shakespeare's line; she suggests it is a private joke, noting that it was applied to the hero Aragorn:

Parallels identified by Judith Kollman
The Lord of the Rings

All that is gold does not glitter,
Not all those who wander are lost;
The old that is strong does not wither,
Deep roots are not reached by the frost.

From the ashes a fire shall be woken,
A light from the shadows shall spring;
Renewed shall be blade that was broken,
The crownless again shall be king.

("The Riddle of Strider".
Book 1, ch. 10 "Strider")

The Merchant of Venice

All that glisters is not gold

(The Prince of Morocco reads from a scroll.
Act II, scene 7)

Henry IV, Part 1

And like bright metal on a sullen ground,
My reformation, glitt'ring o'er my fault

(Prince Hal reflects.
Act I, scene 2)

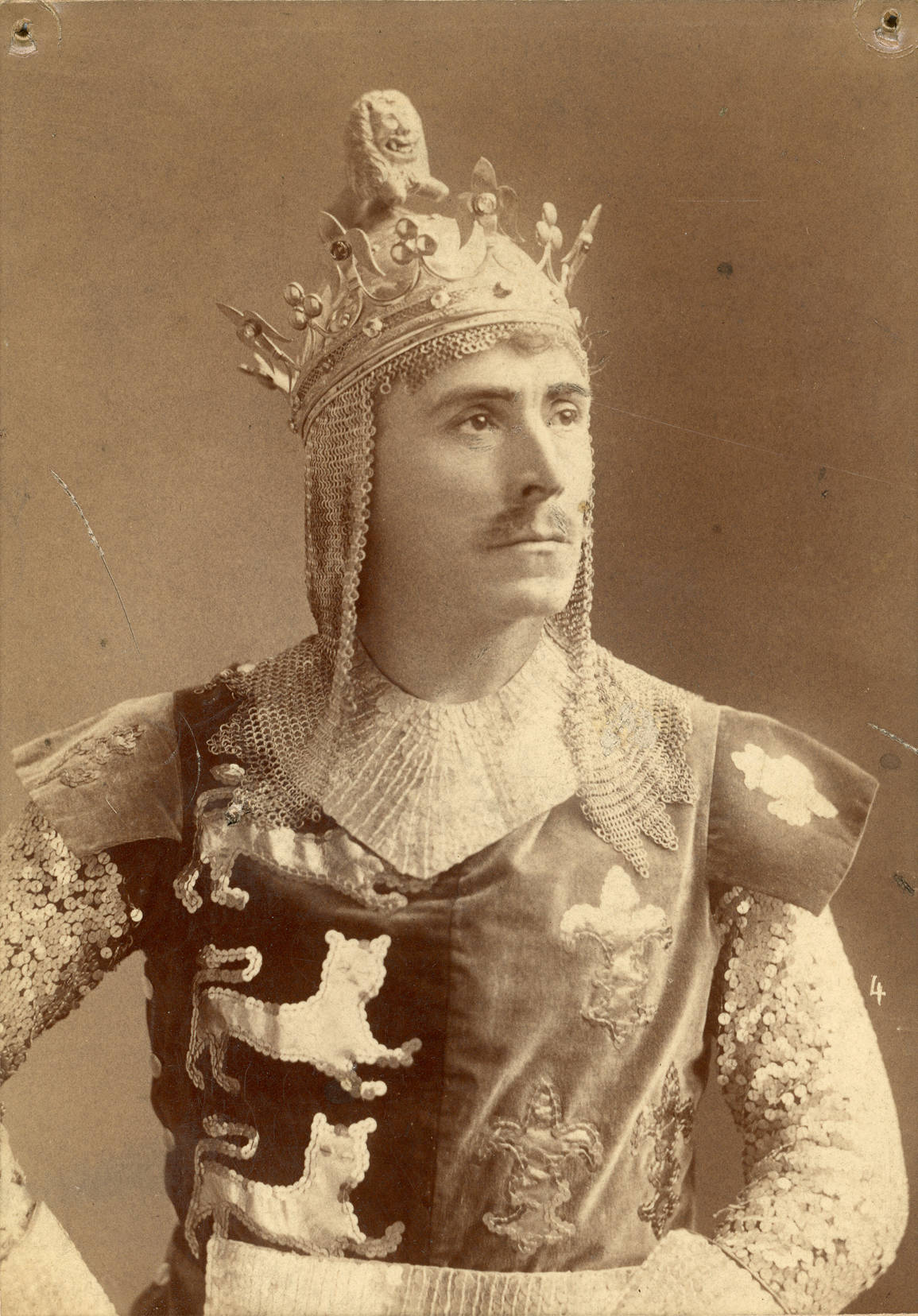
Frederick Warde as Prince Hal in Henry IV, Part 1

Kollman adds that Tolkien used many folk sayings in The Lord of the Rings, as Shakespeare did in his plays, so the echo could be coincidental, but that Tolkien very rarely did anything by accident. She writes that "All that is gold does not glitter" is sufficiently clearly Shakespearean that the reader is invited to look for further influence, in particular that Aragorn, the subject of Tolkien's poem, might be referencing a Shakespearean prince. She suggests that this is Prince Hal (the future King Henry V) of the four Henry plays, writing that "Hal's monologue emphasizes what he seems to be, and perhaps, that he will merely move from mask to mask; Aragorn's explains what he is: ... unquestionably, gold." Kollman further links Aragorn to Prince Hal by contrasting their actions with the symbols of kingly power. As soon as he thinks his father is dead, Prince Hal stretches out his arms and takes the crown: he does not wait for anyone's permission. In contrast, Aragorn says he will take the Palantír of Orthanc, the seeing stone that was once in his ancestor Elendil's royal treasury; but he waits for Gandalf to give it to him. Gandalf lifts the stone, bowing as he presents it to Aragorn, with the words "Receive it, lord!"

Kollman writes that Tolkien "frequently" rewrote Shakespeare, while contradicting the original sentiments. She gives as an example firstly the poem that Bilbo recites to Frodo in Rivendell, (Note: Tolkien 1954a, book 2, ch. 3 "The Ring Goes South") which recalls the final "Song" about winter in Love's Labour's Lost. Shippey calls both Tolkien's and Shakespeare's versions "Shire-poetry". He suggests that Tolkien was "guardedly respectful" of Shakespeare, and that he seems "even to have felt ... a sort of fellow-feeling with him", given that they were "close countrymen", both being from Warwickshire, the county where Tolkien had passed his happiest childhood years, and which he had attempted to "identify with Elfland" in his mythopoeic The Book of Lost Tales at the start of his writing career.

The Lord of the Rings

When winter first begins to bite
and stones crack in the frosty night,
when pools are black and trees are bare,
'tis evil in the Wild to fare.

(Book 2, ch. 3 "The Ring Goes South")

Love's Labour's Lost

When icicles hang by the wall,
And Dick the shepherd blows his nail,
And Tom bears logs into the hall,
And milk comes frozen home in pail,
When blood is nipp’d and ways be foul,
Then nightly sings the staring owl,

("Song", Act V, scene 2)

Kollman gives, too, a section of Antony and Cleopatra:

The Lord of the Rings
"In western lands beneath the Sun"

I will not say the Day is done,
nor bid the Stars farewell.

(Sung by Sam Gamgee in Cirith Ungol
Book 6, ch. 1 "The Tower of Cirith Ungol" )

Antony and Cleopatra

Our bright day is done,
And we are for the dark.

(Spoken by Iras to Cleopatra,
Act 5, scene 2)

Shippey notes in addition that the simple phrase "day is done" must long precede Shakespeare; and that the mention of the stars connects with the Elves' myth of the stars.

== See also ==
- Tolkien and the Celtic
- Tolkien and the classical world
- Tolkien and the Norse
- Tolkien's modern sources
