= Many a true word is spoken in jest =

Adage

Many a true word is spoken in jest is an adage, aphorism or proverb. Its meaning is that a jocular comment may often be accurate.

An early variation appears in The Cook's Tale, written by Geoffrey Chaucer in 1390: "Ful ofte in game a sooth I have herd saye!". Another similar saying is that "Jesters do oft prove prophets", which appears in Shakespeare's King Lear.

== History ==
A version of this appears in the Prologue to The Cook's Tale (written in 1390) by Geoffrey Chaucer: "Ful ofte in game a sooth I have herd saye!".

An early print appearance of the most familiar form of this aphorism was in Volume VII of the Roxburghe Ballads, where it appears in the prologue to The Merry Man's Resolution, or A London Frollick. The ballad purportedly goes back to the 17th century, but the introductory verse was probably written by the editor of the collection, Joseph Woodfall Ebsworth:

He goes a wooing, yet the matter's so,
He cares not much whether he speeds or no;
'Cause City Wives and Wenches are so common,
He thinks it hard to find an honest woman.
Be n't angry with this fellow, I protest
That many a true word hath been spoke in jest.
By degrees he layes a wager, money's scant,
Until five shillings out; then ends his Rant.

James Joyce combined this sentiment with the similar adage of in vino veritas to coin the phrase in risu veritas (in laughter, truth).
