= Edward Zellem =

- Occupations: Author, US Navy Captain, social entrepreneur
- Known for: Award-winning author of 3 books of Afghan Proverbs and Sayings in 15 languages

Edward Zellem is a retired U.S. Navy captain and the 12-time award-winning author of 5 books. He is known for his work inside Afghanistan's Presidential Palace and for authoring three bilingual collections of Afghan Proverbs: Zarbul Masalha: 151 Afghan Dari Proverbs, a book for children entitled Afghan Proverbs Illustrated, and a companion book of Pashto proverbs entitled Mataluna: 151 Afghan Pashto Proverbs. Zellem wrote the books to "show how Afghan proverbs demonstrate our common humanity and the humanity of Afghans, and to share the proverbs' lyricism, richness and deep meanings with the rest of the world". He is a member of the International Association of Paremiology (AIP-IAP), which is based in Tavira, Portugal. It is a nonprofit cultural institution dedicated to the international scientific study of proverbs, and is the only association of its type in the world. He also is an active professional scuba diving instructor with the Professional Association of Diving Instructors (PADI), and holds the PADI rating of Master Instructor.

== Biography ==
Captain Edward Zellem served as a United States Navy officer for 30 years, has lived in six countries and has visited at least 50 others. He can speak Dari and worked in Afghanistan, where for a year and a half he collected and used Dari proverbs every day as a hobby and learning tool. He was a University of Virginia football player, spent time in New Zealand and Thailand, and then joined the Navy to continue to see the world.

== Career ==
Before he joined the Navy, he worked in New Zealand and taught English in a small village in southern Thailand. In 2009, he was selected by the United States Department of Defense for a program called Afghan Hands, which was created in September 2009 to develop military and senior civilian experts specializing in Afghanistan and Pakistan's languages, cultures, processes and challenges. He worked with Afghans in Kandahar and Kabul for a year and a half with the Afghan National Army and the Afghan National Police, respectively, including a year inside Afghanistan's Presidential Palace to help build its "White House Situation Room". The room is known as the Presidential Information Coordination Center (PICC), which Zellem co-founded and co-directed with Afghan Army Brigadier General Sakhi Ahmadzai. It was a key component of the Afghan government's National Security Council Staff under National Security Adviser Dr. Rangin Dadfar Spanta. The PICC was a 24/7 center that directly served the national-level critical information needs of both the President of Afghanistan Hamid Karzai and then-Gen. David Petraeus, the commander of U.S. and NATO forces in Afghanistan.

The Afghanistan-Pakistan Hands Program was conceived in 2009 by then-Chairman of the Joint Chiefs of Staff, Navy Admiral Michael Mullen, as a top-priority program he argued would "change the paradigm" of how the United States employed its forces in Afghanistan. He envisioned an organization of "experts who speak the local language, are culturally attuned, and are focused on the problem for an extended period of time".

The AFPAK Hands program was designed to build trust with the military and local populations. The program creates many experts about particular countries and is based on similar U.S. Navy programs in the 1920s and 1930s that focused on Japan, Germany and China. These experts specialize in intelligence, force protection and governance, as well as language and culture. They work to fight corruption, as a liaison between Afghan organizations and coalition and international groups that can assist them, and may include military advising to organizing sporting events. The first group of "Hands" is composed of more than 500 civilians, officers and enlisted service members from all four services, and Afghan Hands personnel fill 229 in-country billets. Each "Hand" moves through phases of training, deployment and redeployment during a 36- to 45-month tour with the program.

Zellem and a small group of others in the U.S. military have been deployed to serve on the ground as part of the AFPAK Hands program. They underwent extensive training to achieve language proficiency in either Pashto or Dari, the two most common languages spoken in Afghanistan. They sign on for repeated tours of duty and are assigned to Afghan-related positions between deployments.

== Works ==
The purpose of collecting Afghan proverbs was to bridge a cultural and linguistic divide using Social Entrepreneurship as a model. During the time that Zellem spent with young Afghan soldiers who called themselves the "Burnt Generation"—because all they knew in their lifetime was war—he learned that Afghanistan had a rich history of colorful verbal communication, which included communicating through proverbs, though 70 percent of the population can't read. Zellem collected and used proverbs while there and when word of his proverbs list spread, he created about 100 copies of a small bilingual book to give to friends and colleagues.

One of those colleagues was then-Gen. David Petraeus, who liked the book so much that he wrote a foreword, but that planned addition was scrapped after he became Director of the Central Intelligence Agency because the United States Department of State was leery about associating the book with America's spy agency. After his retirement from the military, Petraeus offered his foreword as a cover blurb for the second edition. Zellem also inscribed a copy to give to Gen. John R. Allen, commander of U.S. forces in Afghanistan and the International Security Assistance Force, who then gave it to President Karzai.

Eventually, the faculty of Marefat High School in Kabul—where both boys and girls attend in separate classrooms—heard about the book and wanted to contribute by illustrating, transcribing, typesetting, editing, and distributing the collection. They wanted to use original art by their eighth- and ninth-graders and Aziz Royesh, the high school's cultural officer, edited the content. Eventually, the State Department gave a $66,000 grant to Marefat High School and the book was published by a local Kabul printing house, Afghan-owned and operated Karwan Press. In 2011, 40,000 copies were published and Marefat High School distributed them to other schools and organizations in Afghanistan. The book became part of the reading curriculum in over 200 schools, was accepted in the Kabul University library, and is included in a nationwide village bookmobile program sponsored by Kabul University. He published a second edition of the collection in the United States in order to support literacy programs. In 2015, he published a 3rd edition that contains an additional 50 proverbs obtained by crowdsourcing. Zellem gave a copyright license to Marefat High School to republish and sell the book for profit in Afghanistan.

Like all books in Dari, the Kabul edition of "Zarbul Masalha" opens from right-to-left. The book has a proverb on each page, first written in Dari with the literal translation from Dari, and then the English translation from Zellem.

The second edition of "Zarbul Masalha" was published internationally in May 2012 by CreateSpace. The book was given an award by the Military Writers Society of America in 2013. Edward Zellem's second book, "Afghan Proverbs Illustrated", was published in October 2012 and is designed for children and new readers After readers in many countries asked for bilingual translations in their own languages, the original English-Dari edition of "Afghan Proverbs Illustrated" was published in German-Dari, French-Dari and Russian-Dari editions. Additional translations have also been done, with more in development.

Zellem has said that a number of Afghan American readers told him that his books helped them and their families to practice their Dari and reconnect with their homeland's culture. Others have used the book for Dari/Farsi language studies, to understand Afghans better and general inspiration. One reviewer said that "Zarbul Masalha" is "both a window and a mirror. As a window, it helps readers gain deep insights into Afghan culture and language. And as a mirror, readers can see themselves and their own cultures reflected in the universal messages expressed by Afghan proverbs".

Zellem pioneered the method of collecting proverbs by crowdsourcing, via the Web. This method of collecting proverbs has been shown to be not only efficient at collecting a large number of proverbs, but also at gathering data to assess which proverbs are the most common. In addition, this has been important for involving the community in valuing, discussing, and gathering their proverbs.

== Recognitions ==
In recognition of his books of Afghan proverbs, Zellem was honored by the Afghan diaspora community at the Rumi Awards in October 2013.

Zarbul Masalha earned Zellem an award by the Military Writers Society of America in 2013. Afghan Proverbs Illustrated, proverbs drawn from Zarbul Masalha then printed with color illustrations by Afghan artists, won a bronze medal at the 2014 Independent Publisher Book Awards. As of mid-2017, Zarbul Masalha, Afghan Proverbs Illustrated, and Mataluna have won a total of 12 international book awards.
