= Baba Suwe =

Nigerian actor and comedian (1958–2021)

- Born: Babatunde Omidina; 22 August 1958; Lagos Island, British Nigeria
- Died: 22 November 2021 (aged 63)
- Other name: Baba Suwe
- Citizenship: Nigerian
- Education: Ifeoluwa Grammar School
- Occupations: Actor; comedian
- Years active: 1972–2021

Babatunde Omidina// (22 August 1958 – 22 November 2021) was a Nigerian actor and comedian popularly known as Baba Suwe//.

== Early life ==
Baba Suwe was born on 22 August 1958, in Inabere Street in Lagos Island where he grew up but hailed from the Ikorodu local government area of Lagos State, southwestern Nigeria.

Omidina had his primary education at Jamaitul Islamia Primary School in Lagos and Children Boarding School, Osogbo before he proceeded to Adekanbi Commercial High School in Mile 12, Lagos State, but obtained the West African School Certificate from Ifeoluwa Grammar School in Osogbo, the capital of Osun State, southwestern Nigeria.

== Career ==
Omidina began acting in 1971 but came into the limelight after he featured in a movie titled Omolasan, a film produced by Obalende. He became more popular after he featured in Iru Esin, produced by Olaiya Igwe in 1997. He has featured in and produced several Nigerian movies, such as Baba Jaiye jaiye, a movie that featured Funke Akindele and Femi Adebayo, the son of the veteran actor Adebayo Salami. In 2011, he was accused of cocaine trafficking by the National Drug Law Enforcement Agency, an allegation that was described as false and defamatory by the ruling of the Lagos high court of law. His solicitor was the late Bamidele Aturu, a Nigerian lawyer and human rights activist.

== Death ==
Omidina died on 22 November 2021.

== Filmography ==
- Baoku (1993?) (also writer and producer)
- Idajo-de (1993?)
- Binuseri (1994?)
- Adegbesan (1995?)
- Wind Pipe (Gogongo) (1995)
- Abi-ni-bi (1996)
- Arole (1996)
- Binta My Daughter (1996)
- Ede (Loro Oluwa) (1996)
- The Express Man (Ayarabiasa) (1996)
- Human Feeling (Eleran Ara) (1996?)
- Lady Terror (1996)
- Ha! Obin Rin (1997)
- Kotan Sibe (1997) (also writer and producer)
- Special Guest (Alejo Pataki) (1997)
- Wages of Sin (Ere-Ese) (1997)
- Aiyedun (1998?) (also producer)
- Emi-Kan ₦1000.00 (1998)
- Inestimable Mother (Wura-Omo) (1999?)
- Lagos Girls (Obirin Eko) (1999?)
- Maradona (2003)
- The Treasure (Nkan Elege) (2004)
- Sikiratu Sindodo (2004)
- Afefe Ti Fe... (2005)
- Ayanmo Eda (2005)
- Iwe Aje (2005?)
- Omorewa (2005?)
- Oluweri Magboojo
- Oju Oloju
- Baba Londoner
- Aso Ibora
- Obelomo
- Elebolo
- Larinloodu
- Aimasiko eda (2006)
- O koja ofin (2007)
- Nkan agbara (2008)
- Ikunle kesan (2008)

== See also ==
- List of Yoruba people

== Relevant Studies ==
- Ajayi, Adeola Seleem Olaniyan-Adeola Mercy. "A Comic Wisdom: Taking a Philosophical Interrogation of Baba Suwe’s Postproverbials." POSTPROVERBIALS AT WORK: The Context of Radical Proverb-Making in Nigerian Languages, Aderemi Raji-Oyelade (ed.), 177-202, Online Supplement Series of Proverbium: Yearbook of International Proverb Scholarship. Vol. 4. (2024).
