= MWSA =

MWSA may refer to:

- Military Writers Society of America
- Minnesota Woman Suffrage Association
- Massachusetts Woman Suffrage Association
