= Ian A. O'Connor =

American novelist and U.S. Air Force colonel (1944–2026)

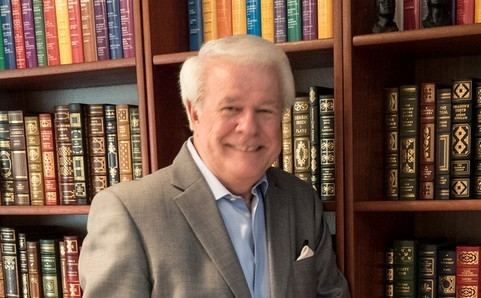
- Born: August 16, 1944; Liverpool, England
- Died: June 5, 2026 (aged 81); Jensen Beach, Florida, U.S.
- Education: Benedictine College (B.A., Political Science)
- Occupations: Author, United States Air Force colonel
- Writing career
- Notable works: The Twilight of the Day, The Seventh Seal, The Barbarossa Covenant, The Wrong Road Home, Point Option, The Pegasus Directive, Scrappy: A Memoir of a Fighter Pilot
- Notable awards: Silver Falchion Award (2022); Bronze Medal, Military Writers Society of America (2018)
- Website: ianaoconnor.com

Ian Andrew O'Connor (August 16, 1944 – June 5, 2026) was an American author and United States Air Force colonel, best known for his military thrillers including The Twilight of the Day and Point Option. His works have earned recognition from the Military Writers Society of America and Killer Nashville Silver Falchion Awards.

== Early life and education ==
O'Connor was born in Liverpool, England, and spent parts of his childhood in London and Dublin before emigrating with his family to Canada and later to the United States. He earned a bachelor’s degree in political science from Benedictine College in Atchison, Kansas.

== Military career ==
After college, O'Connor joined the United States Air Force and served as an intelligence officer in Southeast Asia during his early career. He later held senior leadership positions in national security management while in the Air Force Ready Reserve. He held an FAA commercial pilot’s certificate with single- and multi-engine ratings.

== Post-military career ==
After his active-duty service, O'Connor joined Landmark Insurance of the Palm Beaches. While there, he wrote a professional economics essay: "A Financial Fix That Marks to Market", which was published in TheStreet.com on March 13, 2009. The article offered a solution for jumpstarting the frozen U.S. financial markets during the economic crisis of 2008, drawing extensively on how the insurance industry successfully values its property assets.

O'Connor was awarded United States patent No. 3841513, issued October 15, 1974, for a "Container Having A Safety Closure" to protect children from ingesting dangerous drugs and other toxic household products.

== Writing career ==
O'Connor studied fiction writing in workshops and seminars and in 2000, he released his first military-themed thriller, The Twilight of the Day, which was republished in 2015 and 2025. The Air Force Times book review called it 'clever, original, and intriguing, mixing fiction with real characters and events.'

He followed this with the Justin Scott geopolitical thriller series, beginning with The Seventh Seal in 2006, and The Barbarossa Covenant in 2015. Both were republished in 2025. The Seventh Seal was nominated for the 2006 Edgar Award for best murder mystery. Kirkus Reviews described The Barbarossa Covenant as “fitting nicely into the Tom Clancy–meets–Dan Brown canon.”

In addition to fiction, O'Connor co-authored Scrappy: A Memoir of a Fighter Pilot in Korea and Vietnam (McFarland & Company), recounting the career of Col. Howard "Scrappy" Johnson.

In 2015, O'Connor released The Wrong Road Home, based on the true story of a well respected Miami physician (a friend of O'Connor with shared Irish heritage) who was uncovered as a fraud by the Miami Herald.

O'Connor's final works included Point Option: A Time-Travel Military Thriller (2021), and The Pegasus Directive (2023).

== Personal life and death ==
Prior to his death, O'Connor lived on Florida's Treasure Coast with his wife, Candice. He died June 5, 2026, at the age of 81.

== Reception and awards ==
O'Connor's novels received positive reviews from critics and military literature circles.

His co-authored biography, Scrappy: A Memoir of a U.S. Fighter Pilot in Korea and Vietnam, was noted within the international military aviation community for its detailed account of Howard Johnson’s career, and copies are held in both the U.S. Naval Academy and U.S. Air Force Academy libraries.

Awards further reinforced O'Connor’s critical reception: The Twilight of the Day earned a Bronze Medal from the Military Writers Society of America (2017), and Point Option was awarded the Silver Falchion Award for Best Thriller in 2022.

His last novel, The Pegasus Directive, which portrays an alternative view of the forces behind the Kennedy assassination, was a finalist for The Claymore Award.

== Memberships ==
O'Connor was a member of the Air Commando Association, an associate member of the Red River Valley Fighter Pilots Association, and a member of Mystery Writers of America.

== Bibliography ==
=== Novels ===
- O’Connor, Ian A. (2025). The Twilight of the Day (Revised ed.). Pegasus Publishing. ISBN 9781737422969.
- O’Connor, Ian A. (2025). The Seventh Seal (Revised ed.). Pegasus Publishing. ISBN 9781737422983.
- O’Connor, Ian A. (2015). The Barbarossa Covenant. Pegasus Publishing. ISBN 9780692476369.
- O’Connor, Ian A. (2016). The Wrong Road Home. Pegasus Publishing. ISBN 9780692569658.
- O’Connor, Ian A. (2021). Point Option: A Time-Travel Military Thriller. Pegasus Publishing. ISBN 9781737422907.
- O’Connor, Ian A. (2023). The Pegasus Directive (Hardcover ed.). Pegasus Publishing. ISBN 9781737422921.

=== Non-fiction ===
- Johnson, Howard C. "Scrappy"; O’Connor, Ian A. (2008). Scrappy: A Memoir of a Fighter Pilot in Korea and Vietnam. McFarland & Company. ISBN 9780786432042.
