= Paremiography =

Study of the collection and writing of proverbs

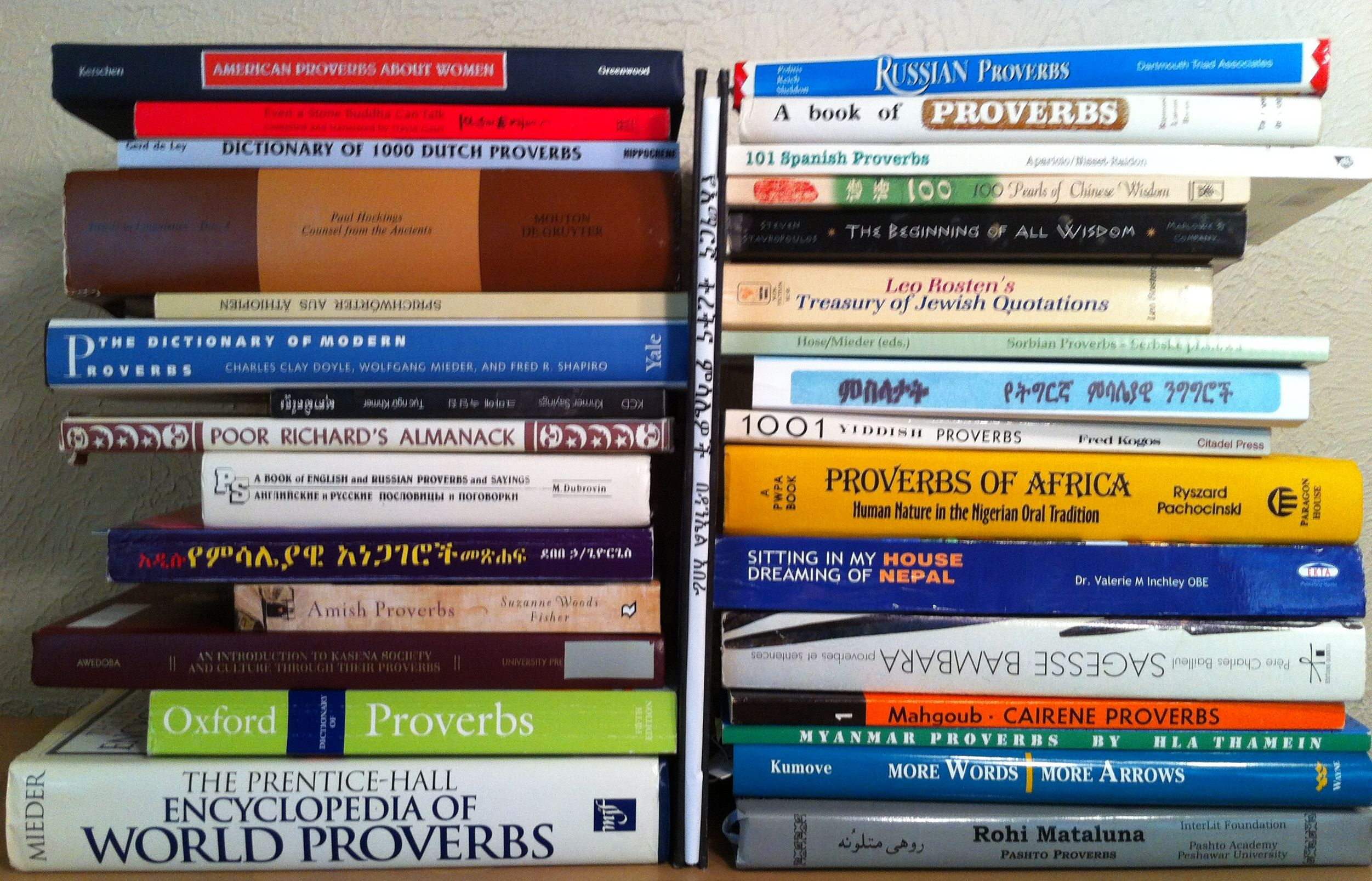
Books of proverb collections, examples of paremiography

Paremiography (from Greek παροιμία - paroimía, "proverb, maxim, saw" and γράφω - grafō, "write, inscribe") is the study of the collection and writing of proverbs. A recent introduction to the field has been written by Tamás Kispál. It is a sub-field of paremiology, the study of proverbs.

There are many published collection of proverbs, ranging from ancient Akkadian clay tablets to internet sites. The proverb collection The Maxims of Ptahhotep has been describe as "the oldest book in the world". Published collections of proverbs are formatted in a variety of ways. Some are simply alphabetized lists, some are arranged by topic (such as laziness, respect for elders), others are arranged by key word (such as dog, rain). Some are from single languages (for example, Russian), others are multilingual but from a single country (for example, Nigeria), while others are collections from around the world. Others are collections of anti-proverbs rather than the more standard proverbs (Reznikov 2009). Some have collected proverbs and sayings of a certain structure, such as wellerisms. Some collections are a combination of these, such as proverbs about women from around the world. The journal Proverbium providers a list of newly published (or newly discovered) collections of proverbs from around the world.

Collecting proverbs in languages with a literate heritage is usually done by looking for examples in the available literature. There are published collections in many languages with long written traditions, Greek, Latin, Russian, French, German, Greek, Chinese, etc. In addition, there are published collections from languages that do not have a long written tradition, such as Temne, Oromo, Bambara, Bassa.

The most famous published collection of proverbs is the Latin Adagia collected by Erasmus, mostly from ancient literature. As people from across Europe read the proverbs it contained, they often translated them into local languages, spreading them across Europe. This is the source of many English proverbs, including "In the land of the blind, the one-eyed man is king" from "In regione caecorum rex est luscus".

There are continuing efforts to collect proverbs not just from published sources, but from the speakers of languages. For example, there has been a project to collect proverbs from multiple generations of French speakers in Belgium.

There has been a call for collecting and documenting the proverbs of undocumented languages, especially those that are endangered (Himmelmann 1998), as part of the broader task of language documentation. However, when scholars collect proverbs from languages without a literate history, it requires different approaches than for languages with a written heritage, such as methods described by Yankah (1989), Unseth (2008), and Tadesse Jaleta Jirata (2009).

Collecting proverbs from speakers is best done in the language community's home area. However, proverbs have also been collected in emigrant communities, such as among the Georgian-speaking community in Israel, the Assyrian community in California. and German speakers in Los Angeles.

Edward Zellem has developed a method for collecting proverbs via social media. In this way, he was able to collect hundreds of proverbs from the Pashto language of Afghanistan and Pakistan, even though he was in the USA. Another advantage of this method was that the members of the community also interacted with each other about their proverbs, tweeting comments and retweeting proverbsback and forth within the Pashto-speaking community.

Many pioneering proverb collections having been collected and published by Christian workers, both from within language communities, such as Aster Ganno of Ethiopia and Samuel Ajayi Crowther of Nigeria, and by those from outside the language communities, such as William Shellabear of Malaysia and others. There is an ongoing series of collections of proverbs gathered from small languages of eastern Africa being published under the inspiration of Joseph Healey, published both in hard copy and on the web.

However, the collection and documentation of proverbs even in languages with a literate history is never completely done, new proverbs are constantly being created and old ones fall into disuse. No collection is either totally complete or up to date (Taylor 1969). An attempt to update the list of recent English proverbs is The Dictionary of Modern Proverbs from 2012, which contains only proverbs documented after 1900, such as "If it ain't broke, don't fix it" and "Stop and smell the roses."

Some scholars collect and list the proverbs used by certain authors or speakers, such as Chaucer, Martin Luther (Cornette 1997), Abraham Lincoln (Mieder 2000), and Agatha Christie (Bryan 1993).

A listing of proverb collections from around the world has been published as International Bibliography of Paremiography (Wolfgang Mieder 2011).
