= Primum viver deinde philosophari =

Latin expression meaning "Live first, then philosophize"

Primum vivere deinde philosophari (read with a caesura after vivere, as Primum vivere, deinde philosophari) is a Latin expression meaning "live first, then philosophize". It is an admonition to lead an active life before engaging in speculative thought, and serves as a warning against theorizing without being grounded.

== History ==
The phrase is sometimes attributed to the English philosopher Thomas Hobbes (1588–1679), although this cannot be confirmed. Similar sentiments have often been expressed earlier.

Although its exact provenance remains uncertain, the maxim reflects a long-standing contrast in Greco-Roman thought between the active life and the otium of speculative leisure. Aristotle already opposes practical action to purely theoretical contemplation (Politics 7.1333a35; 1334a16; 1337b34). Another tradition likewise urges the acquisition of life's necessities before the pursuit of virtue or wisdom. Fragment 9 of the archaic poet Phocylides, quoted by Alexander of Aphrodisias when commenting on Aristotle's Topics, states that

To be a philosopher and to theorize is better than to make money, but it is not preferable for those who are in need and are unable to escape from it. For, in the words of Phocylides: δίζησθαι βιοτήν, ἀρετὴν δ᾿ ὅταν ᾖ βίος ἤδη. ''Seek a livelihood, and when livelihood is secure, seek excellence.''

This was repeated by later paremiographers like Diogenianus 4.39, Gregory of Cyprus 1.95, and Arsenius 6.8a.

Plato alludes to the same sentiment in Republic 3.407a, when he attributes to Phocylides the advice that, after a man has made his living (ἀρετὴν ἀσκεῖν), he ought to practice virtue (ὅταν τῳ ἤδη βίος ᾖ).

In Latin literature, the theme recurs. Horace contrasts a narrowly mercenary ethic with the higher claims of virtue.

Vilius argentum est auro, virtutibus aurum. / ''o cives, cives, quaerenda pecunia primum est; / virtus post nummos!'' haec lanus summus ab imo

Of less worth than gold is silver, than virtue gold. ''O citizens, citizens, money you first must seek; virtue after pelf.'' This rule the Janus arcade proclaims from top to bottom

Cicero repeats the hierarchy of practice over theory when advising his son Cicero Minor: ''Philosophiae quidem praecepta noscenda, vivendum autem esse civiliter'' ''The precepts of philosophy must indeed be learned, but, above all, one must live as a citizen.'' (Epistulae ad Marcum filium fr. 2). Lactantius later cites the line in Institutiones Divinae as part of a polemic against pagan philosophers, faulting them for divorcing doctrine from life.

== Variants ==
A conceptually similar (but formally opposite) expression appears in Miguel de Cervantes's Don Quixote, in the "Dialogue between Babieca and Rocinante". Babieca, the Cid's war‐horse, says "You're metaphysical."; to which Rocinante, Don Quixote's gaunt horse, replies, "From want of food."

In German, there is a conceptually related saying, ''Erst kommt das Fressen, dann kommt die Moral.'' (''First comes the eating, and then comes the morality''), from the 1928 Threepenny Opera by Kurt Weill and Bertolt Brecht. Note that "Fressen" is German for "eating in an animal way".

On the opposite side, one who subordinates needs or even life preservation to high-minded ideals lives by the maxim: Navigare necesse est, vivere non est necesse (''sailing is necessary, life is not''). That maxim is attributed by Plutarch to Pompey, who during a heavy storm ordered sailors to sail from Africa to Rome with a ship full of food. The original is in Greek: "πλεῖν ἀνάγκη, ζῆν οὐκ ἀνάγκη".

=== Grammar ===
Several alternate formulations of the expression exist, each replacing the first element with another basic need:

- Primum manducare, deinde philosophari ( "eat first, then philosophize")
- Primum panem, deinde philosophari ( "bread first, then philosophize")
- Primum bibere, deinde philosophari ( "drink first, then philosophize")

Although the opening word varies—common forms being panem, manducare and vivere—the second element remains philosophari, since it is a deponent verb whose infinitive conveys an active sense.

== See also ==
- Carpe diem
- Navigare necesse est
- List of Latin phrases
