= Bamidele Aturu =

Nigerian lawyer and human rights activist

- Born: 16 October 1964; Ogbagi, Ondo State, Nigeria
- Died: 9 July 2014 (aged 49); Lagos
- Resting place: Ogbagi Akoko, Ondo state
- Education: Adeyemi College of Education, Obafemi Awolowo University, University of Lagos,
- Occupations: Nigerian lawyer and human rights activist

Bamidele Aturu (16 October 1964 – 9 July 2014) was a Nigerian lawyer and human rights activist.

== Life and career ==
Aturu was born on 16 October 1964 in Ogbagi, Ondo State, Nigeria to the family of Aturu. He studied physics at Adeyemi College of Education. He proceeded to Obafemi Awolowo University in 1989 to study law and graduated with LL.B in 1994. He later attended Nigerian Law School and was called to the Bar in 1995. He obtained a master's degree in law (LL.M) from the prestigious, University of Lagos in 1996.

In 2010, he took the Council for Legal Education to court, demanding for the reduction in the fees that increase the chances of indigent Law students to make it to the Law School. Also in 2012, he wrote to the former Governor of the Central Bank of Nigeria, Sanusi Lamido Sanusi, asking him to disclose his salary, allowances and other entitlements. He was committed to representing the oppressed individuals and groups. He was the author of several law books, including A Handbook of Nigerian Labour Laws, Nigerian Labour Laws, Elections and the Law. He turned down his nomination, as a representative of the civil society, in the National Conference on the basis that the conference, could not meet the expectations of Nigerians. He died in Lagos on 9 July 2014, and was buried in his hometown, Ogbagi Akoko, Ondo state, Nigeria. He had two children.

== See also ==
- Babatunde Omidina

== See also ==
- Ondo State
