= Anna T. Litovkina =

Hungarian linguist and psychologist (born 1963)

- Born: 29 July 1963 (age 63); Russian SFSR, Soviet Union
- Education: Moscow State University (M.A., 1985); Hungarian Academy of Sciences (Ph.D., 1994); Eötvös Loránd University (Habilitation, 2007); University of Practical Psychology, Moscow (2017–present)
- Occupations: Linguist, folklorist, author, researcher, psychologist
- Known for: Expert on proverbs and humor

Anna T. Litovkina (born July 29, 1963) is a Russian-born Hungarian linguist and psychologist.

== Life ==
Originally from Russian SFSR, Litovkina lives in Hungary and is Associate Professor in the Department of English Language and Literature at Selye János University, Komárno, Slovakia. Previously she has been employed by University of Pécs (Szekszárd, Hungary), János Kodolányi University College (Székesfehérvár, Hungary), University of Information Technology and Management in Rzeszów (Rzeszów, Poland), Tischner European University (Kraków, Poland), and a number of other European universities and colleges.

Litovkina holds a PhD in ethnography from the Hungarian Academy of Sciences. She is also a habilitated doctor in linguistics and a psychologist. She has taught a great variety of courses on linguistics, folklore, cultural studies, theory of communication at various Hungarian, Slovak, Polish and Kazakh universities. She has also had series of workshops on goal-setting, procrastination, habits, motivation and time-management.

Litovkina has done research at the University of California, Berkeley (with Fulbright Scholarship), and at Oxford University Press. She has lectured at E.A. Buketov Karaganda State University (Kazakhstan); University of Florence (Italy); University of Vic (Spain); Partium Christian University (Romania); Artesis University College Antwerpen (Belgium); Oriel College, Oxford University, University of Edinburgh, University of Sheffield (United Kingdom); University of Houston, University of Vermont, Purdue University (United States); and many other universities abroad.

She has been the organizer and the chair of program committee of five Hungarian national interdisciplinary humor conferences and of two international symposia on humor. Beyond more than one hundred scholarly articles, she is the author or co-author of fifteen books. She is the co-editor of eleven volumes. She is known for her work on anti-proverbs.

== Works ==
=== Selected books ===
- (1999). (co-author with Wolfgang Mieder) Twisted Wisdom: Modern Anti-Proverbs. Burlington: The University of Vermont, 254 pp. New edition: (2002). Twisted Wisdom: Modern Anti-Proverbs. DeProverbio.com: Hobart, Tasmania (Australia), 254 pp.
- (2000). A Proverb a Day Keeps Boredom Away. Szekszárd–Pécs: IPF–Könyvek, 396 pp.
- (2004). Once upon a Proverb: Old and New Tales Shaped by Proverbs. Szekszárd, 108 pp.
- (2005). Magyar közmondástár. Budapest: Tinta Könyvkiadó, 848 pp. {A Dictionary of Hungarian Proverbs} New edition: (2010). Magyar közmondások nagy szótára. {The big dictionary of Hungarian proverbs}. Budapest: Tinta Könyvkiadó, 848 pp.
- (2005). (co-author with Wolfgang Mieder) „A közmondást nem hiába mondják”. Vizsgálatok a proverbiumok természetéről és használatáról. Budapest: Tinta Könyvkiadó, 204 pp. {“A Proverb is not Said in Vain”: A Study of the Nature and Use of Proverbs}
- (2005). (co-author with Katalin Vargha) „Viccében él a nemzet”. Magyar közmondás-paródiák, Budapest, 102 pp. {“The Nation Lives in Its Jokes”: Hungarian Proverb Parodies}
- (2005). (co-author with Katalin Vargha) „Éhes diák pakkal álmodik”. Egyetemisták közmondás-elváltoztatásai, Budapest, 94 pp. {“A Hungry Student Dreams about a Parcel”: Students’ Proverb Variations}
- (2006). (co-author with Katalin Vargha) „Viccében él a nemzet”. Válogatott közmondás-paródiák, Budapest: Nyitott Könyvműhely, 168 pp. {“The Nation Lives in Its Jokes”: Selected Proverb Parodies}
- (2006). (co-author with Wolfgang Mieder) Old Proverbs Never Die, They Just Diversify: A Collection of Anti-Proverbs. Burlington: The University of Vermont – Veszprém: The Pannonian University of Veszprém, 416 pp.
- (2015). Teaching Proverbs and Anti-Proverbs. Komarnó: J. Selye University, 160 pp.
- (2016). “Do You Serve Lawyers and Politicians Here?”: Stereotyped Lawyers and Politicians in Anglo-American Jokes and Anti-Proverbs, Komarnó: J. Selye University Faculty of Education, 190 pp.
- (2017): Aki keres, az talál. Bibliai közmondások szótára. Budapest: Tinta Könyvkiadó, 226 pp.
- (2017). Teaching Proverbs and Anti-Proverbs, Komarnó: J. Selye University Faculty of Education, 260 pp.
- (2018). (co-author with Hrisztalina Hrisztova-Gotthardt, Péter Barta and Katalin Vargha): A közmondásferdítések ma: Öt nyelv antiproverbiumainak nyelvészeti vizsgálata. Budapest: Tinta Könyvkiadó, 158 pp.
- (2019). Women through Anti-Proverbs. London: Palgrave Macmillan, 211 pp.

=== Selected books and journals (edited by) ===
- (2007). (co-editor with Carl Lindahl) Acta Ethnographica Hungarica 52(1) on Anti-Proverbs in Contemporary Societies, 286 pp.
- (2008). (co-editor with Margit Daczi and Péter Barta) Ezerarcú humor. Az I. Magyar Interdiszciplináris Humorkonferencia előadásai. Budapest: Tinta Könyvkiadó, 320 pp.
- (2009). (co-editor with Péter Barta) Special issue of Acta Ethnographica Hungarica on Humor and Folklore, 259 pp.
- (2010). (co-editor with Péter Barta and Judit Hidasi): A humor dimenziói. Tinta Könyvkiadó – BGF, 260 pp.
- (2010). (co-editor with Péter Barta and Margit Daczi) Linguistics Shots at Humour. Kraków: Tertium, 231 pp.
- (2012). (co-editor with Péter Medgyes, Judit Sollosy, and Brzozowska Dorota) Hungarian Humour. Humor and Culture 3, Kraków: Tertium, 384 pp.
- (2013). (co-editor with Katalin Vargha and Zsuzsanna Barta). Sokszínű humor. A III. Magyar Interdiszciplináris Humorkonferencia előadásai. Budapest: Tinta Könyvkiadó – ELTE Bölcsészettudományi Kar – Magyar Szemiotikai Társaság.
- (2014). (co-editor with Peter Zolczer, Peter Barta and Andrea Puskas) special issue of Eruditio–Educatio: Research Journal of the Faculty of Education of J. Selye University 2014/3 (Volume 9) on Humour in Contemporary Societies, 146 pp.
- (2016) (co-editor with Peter Zolczer and Péter Barta, guest editors): The European Journal of Humour Research (2016) 4(1), 125 pp.
- (2016). (co-editor with Judit Boda-Ujlaky, Zsuzsanna Barta and Péter Barta) A humor nagyítón keresztül. Budapest: Tinta Könyvkiadó – Selye János Egyetem – ELTE Bölcsészettudományi Kar, 231 pp.
- (2018). (co-editor with Attila László Nemesi, Zsuzsanna Barta and Péter Barta) Humorstílusok és -stratégiák. Budapest: Tinta Könyvkiadó, 484 pp.
