= Wolfgang Mieder =

Scholar of proverbs (born 1944)

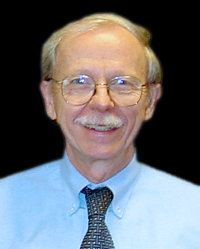
- Born: 17 February 1944 (age 82); Nossen, Saxony, Germany
- Education: Olivet College (B.A.); University of Michigan (M.A.); Michigan State University (PhD)
- Known for: Expert on proverbs
- Scientific career
- Fields: German and folklore
- Workplaces: University of Vermont

Wolfgang Mieder (born 17 February 1944 in Nossen) is a retired professor of German and folklore who taught for 50 years at the University of Vermont, in Burlington, Vermont. He is a graduate of Olivet College (BA), the University of Michigan (MA), and Michigan State University (PhD). He has been a guest speaker at the University of Freiburg in Germany, the country where he was born.

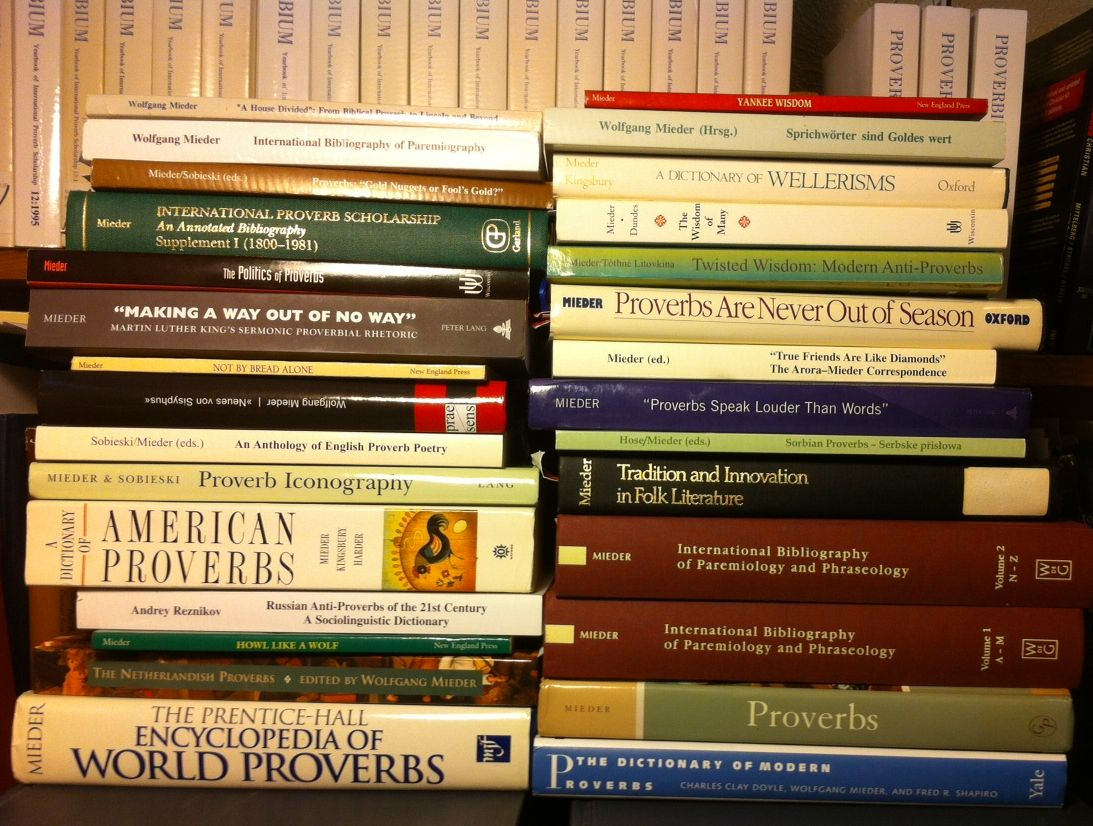
Small sampling of books that Mieder has written or edited, Proverbium on shelf in rear

He is most well known as a scholar of paremiology, the study of proverbs, Alan Dundes labeling him "Magister Proverbium, paremiologist without peer". He also produced many bibliographies, both articles and volumes, on several topics within paremiology. His most complete work in this area is his 2009 International Bibliography of Paremiology and Phraseology, published in two volumes. In 2023, his International Bibliography of Paremiology and Phraseology (2008-2022) was published.

From 1984 through 2021 he was the editor of Proverbium: Yearbook of International Proverb Scholarship, an annual journal published by the University of Vermont. He was also editor of the Supplement Series to Proverbium, a series of book on various facets of proverb studies. Each volume of Proverbium contained his annual list of recent proverb scholarship.

He has published extensively in English and in German. He is the creator of the term anti-proverb, proverbs that are twisted from their original forms. The term became more established with the publication of Twisted Wisdom: Modern Anti-Proverbs by Mieder and Anna T. Litovkina.

His work also includes contributions to paremiography, the collecting and writing of proverbs. He has published a number of collections of proverbs, both topical and international. He has also published a bibliography of paremiography, a list of proverb collections.

Mieder received the American Folklore Society's Lifetime Scholarly Achievement Award in 2012. He was honored by three festschrift publications on his 60th birthday, and another for his 65th birthday. He has been recognized by biographical publications that focused on his scholarship. In 2012, he was awarded a European folklore award, the European Folklore Prize In 2014, he was awarded an honorary doctorate by the University of Athens, and in 2015 "Doctor Honoris Causa" by the University of Bucharest. For his seventieth birthday in 2014 friends and colleagues from around the world contributed sixty-six essays to Gegengabe, an international festschrift volume to honor Wolfgang Mieder for his contributions to world scholarship and his outstanding personality. For his 75th birthday, colleagues honored him with another festschrift: Living by the Golden Rule: Mentor – Scholar – World Citizen: A Festschrift for Wolfgang Mieder’s 75th Birthday. To honor Mieder on his 80th birthday, proverb scholars produced an 828-page festschrift, “STANDING ON THE SHOULDERS OF GIANTS” A Festschrift in honour of Wolfgang Mieder on the occasion of his 80th birthday. In 2024, the University of Vermont awarded him an honorary doctorate. In 2025, the German government awarded him the Order of Merit.

Mieder's work has become the topic of study for other scholars.

Mieder, originally from Germany, has lived in Vermont for more than four decades, teaching at the University of Vermont, and has published four books on proverbs of New England and Vermont. His perspective and contributions from two countries has been the topic of an article.

== Honors ==
- Honorary doctorate

== Selected books written or edited by Mieder ==
Books on paremiology

- 1981. Co-editor with Alan Dundes. The Wisdom of Many: Essays on the Proverb. New York: Garland Publishing. (Paperback edition: Madison, Wisconsin: The University of Wisconsin Press, 1994.)
- 1982. Antisprichwörter. (Anti-Proverbs.) Wiesbaden: Verlag für deutsche Sprache. 2nd ed. 1983.
- 1987. Tradition and Innovation in Folk Literature. Hanover, New Hampshire: University Press of New England.
- 1992. Sprichwort - Wahrwort!? Studien zur Geschichte, Bedeutung und Funktion deutscher Sprichwörter. (Proverb - Truism!? Studies Concerning the History, Meaning, and Function of German Proverbs.) Frankfurt am Main: Peter Lang.
- 1983. Proverbs Are Never Out of Season: Popular Wisdom in the Modern Age. New York: Oxford University Press.
- 1999. Co-author with Anna Tóthné Litovkina. Twisted Wisdom: Modern Anti-Proverbs. Burlington, Vermont: The University of Vermont.
- 2002. "Call a Spade a Spade": From Classical Phrase to Racial Slur. A Case Study. New York: Peter Lang.
- 2004. Proverbs: A Handbook. Westport, Connecticut: Greenwood Press. (Reprint: New York: Peter Lang, 2012.)
- 2004. "The Netherlandish Proverbs". An International Symposium on the Pieter Brueg(h)els. Burlington, Vermont: The University of Vermont.
- 2008. "Proverbs Speak Louder Than Words". Folk Wisdom in Art, Culture, Folklore, History, Literature, and Mass Media. New York: Peter Lang.
- 2014. Behold the Proverbs of a People: Proverbial Wisdom in Culture, Literature, and Politics. Jackson, MS: University of Mississippi Press.

Proverb bibliographies:

- 1977. International Bibliography of Explanatory Essays on Individual Proverbs and Proverbial Expressions. Bern: Peter Lang.
- 1978. Proverbs in Literature: An International Bibliography. Bern: Peter Lang.
- 1984. Investigations of Proverbs, Proverbial Expressions, Quotations and Cliches: A Bibliography of Explanatory Essays which Appeared in "Notes and Queries" (1849–1983). Bern: Peter Lang.
- 1996. with George B. Bryan. Proverbs in World Literature: A Bibliography. New York: Peter Lang.
- 1999. with Janet Sobieski. Proverb Iconography: An International Bibliography. New York: Peter Lang.
- 2003. Proverbs and the Social Sciences: An Annotated International Bibliography. Baltmannsweiler: Schneider Verlag Hohengehren.
- 2009. International Bibliography of Paremiology and Phraseology. 2 vols. Berlin: Walter de Gruyter.

Holocaust and Jewish studies:

- 1995. The Jewish Experience of European Anti-Semitism. Harry H. Kahn Memorial Lectures (1990–1994). Eds. Hazel Kahn Keimowitz and Wolfgang Mieder. Burlington, Vermont: The Center for Holocaust Studies at the University of Vermont.
- 1996. The Holocaust: Introductory Essays. Eds. David Scrase and W. Mieder. Burlington, Vermont: The Center for Holocaust Studies at the University of Vermont.
- 1999. Shifting Paradigms in German-Jewish Relations (1750–2000). Harry H. Kahn Memorial Lectures (1995–1999). Eds. Hazel Kahn Keimowitz and Wolfgang Mieder. Burlington, Vermont: The Center for Holocaust Studies at the University of Vermont.
- 2001. The Holocaust: Personal Accounts. Eds. David Scrase and Wolfgang Mieder. Burlington, Vermont: The Center for Holocaust Studies at the University of Vermont.
- 2001. Reflections on the Holocaust. Festschrift for Raul Hilberg on His Seventy-Fifth Birthday. Eds. Wolfgang Mieder and David Scrase. Burlington, Vermont: The Center for Holocaust Studies at the University of Vermont.
- 2004. Language, Poetry, and Memory. Reflections on National Socialism. Harry H. Kahn Memorial Lectures (2000–2004). Eds. W. Mieder and David Scrase. Burlington, Vermont: Center for Holocaust Studies at the University of Vermont.
- 2004. Making a Difference. Rescue and Assistance During the Holocaust. Essays in Honor of Marion Pritchard. Eds. David Scrase, Wolfgang Mieder, and Katherine Quimby Johnson. Burlington, Vermont: Center for Holocaust Studies at the University of Vermont.

Studies of European folktales

- 2007. The Pied Piper. A Handbook. Westport, Connecticut: Greenwood Press.
- 2007. Hänsel und Gretel: Das Märchen in Kunst, Musik, Literatur, Medien und Karikaturen. (Hänsel and Gretel: The Fairy Tale in Art, Music, Literature, Mass Media, and Caricatures.) Wien: Praesens Verlag.
- 2008. Co-editor with Sabine Wienker-Piepho. Lutz Röhrich. "And They Are Still Living Happily Ever After": Anthropology, Cultural History, and Interpretation of Fairy Tales. Burlington, Vermont: The University of Vermont.
- 2009. "Märchen haben kurze Beine": Moderne Märchenreminiszenzen in Literatur, Medien und Karikaturen. ("Fairy Tales Have Short Legs [i.e., They Lie]": Modern Fairy Tale Reminiscences in Literature, Media, and Caricatures.) Wien: Praesens.
