= Paremiology =

Collection and study of proverbs

Paremiology (from Greek παροιμία (paroimía) 'proverb, maxim, saw') is the collection and study of proverbs (paroemias). It is a subfield of philology, folklore studies, and linguistics.

== History ==
Paremiology can be dated back as far as Aristotle. Paremiography, on the other hand, is the collection of proverbs. The proverb scholar Wolfgang Mieder defines the term proverb as follows:

A proverb is a short, generally known sentence of the folk which contains wisdom, truth, morals, and traditional views in a metaphorical, fixed and memorizable form and which is handed down from generation to generation.

— Mieder 1985:119; also in Mieder 1993:24

== Categorization ==
As well as actual proverbs, the following may be considered proverbial phrases:

- Proverbial comparison, such as "as busy as a bee."
- Proverbial interrogative, such as "Does a chicken have lips?"
- Wellerism, named after Sam Weller from Charles Dickens's The Pickwick Papers (1837), is a triad that consists of a statement (often a proverb), an identification of a speaker (person or animal), and a phrase that places the statement into an unexpected situation. An example: "Every evil is followed by some good," the man said when his wife died the day after he became bankrupt.
- anti-proverb or perverb. This is a misuse or adaptation of a familiar proverb to twist or change its meaning. Examples include: "Nerds of a feather flock together," "Early to bed and early to rise makes a man healthy, wealthy, and likely to talk about it," and "Absence makes the heart grow wander." Anti-proverbs are common on T-shirts, such as "If at first you don't succeed, skydiving is not for you." Even classic Latin proverbs can be remolded as anti-proverbs, such as "Carpe noctem" from "Carpe diem." Anti-proverbs are not new; Aristophanes is credited with creating one over 2,300 years ago.
- Proverbial expression, such as "to bite the dust." This is not strictly a proverb, which should be a fixed unchangeable sentence; a proverbial expression permits alteration to fit the grammar of the context.
- Allusion, which is a reference to a proverb rather than a statement of the proverb. An example: "The new boss will probably fire some of the old staff, you know what they say about a new broom." This allusion refers to the proverb "A new broom sweeps clean."

== Styles ==
Typical stylistic features of proverbs (as Shirley Arora points out in her article, The Perception of Proverbiality (1984)) are:

- Alliteration (Forgive and forget)
- Parallelism (Nothing ventured, nothing gained)
- Rhyme (When the cat is away, the mice will play)
- Ellipsis (Once bitten, twice shy)

== Metaphorical links ==
To make the respective statement more general, most proverbs are based on a metaphor. Further typical features of proverbs are their shortness and the fact that their authors are generally unknown.

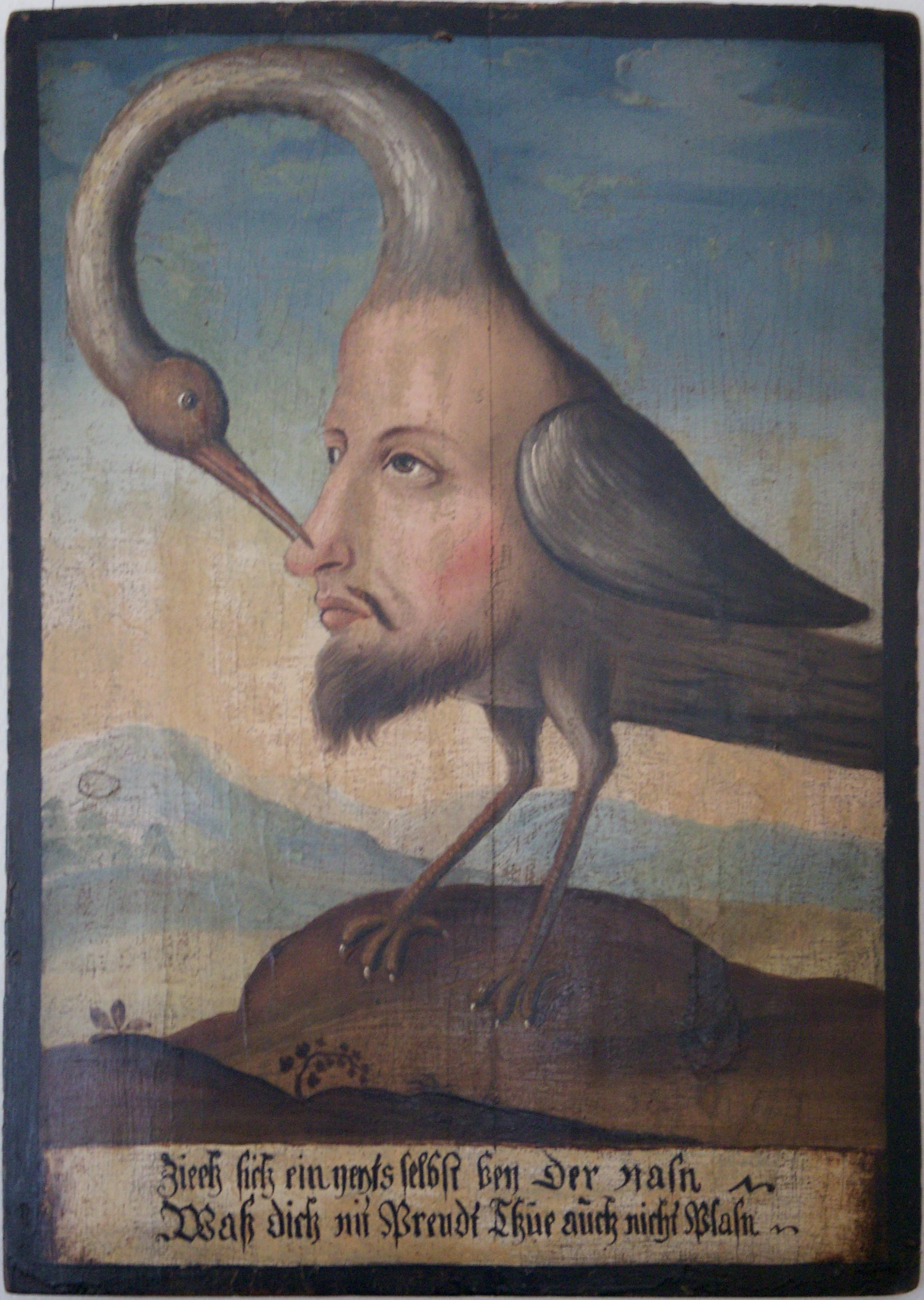
Nimm dich selbst bei der Nase ("take yourself by your nose"). It's also called "Vogel Selbsterkenntnis" (Bird of self-knowledge)

== Interpretations from other languages ==
In the article "Tensions in Proverbs: More Light on International Understanding", Joseph Raymond comments on what common Russian proverbs from the 18th and 19th centuries portray: Potent antiauthoritarian proverbs reflected tensions between the Russian people and the Czar. The rollickingly malicious undertone of these folk verbalizations constitutes what might be labeled a "paremiological revolt". To avoid openly criticizing a given authority or cultural pattern, folk take recourse to proverbial expressions which voice personal tensions in a tone of generalized consent. Proverbs that speak to the political disgruntlement include: "When the Czar spits into the soup dish, it fairly bursts with pride"; "If the Czar be a rhymester, woe be to the poets"; and "The hen of the Czarina herself does not lay swan's eggs". While none of these proverbs state directly, "I hate the Czar and detest my situation" (which would have been incredibly dangerous), they do get their points across.

Proverbs are found in many parts of the world, but some areas seem to have richer stores of proverbs than others (such as West Africa), while others have hardly any (North and South America) (Mieder 2004b:108,109).

== Users of proverbs ==
Proverbs are used by speakers for a variety of purposes. Sometimes they are used as a way of saying something gently, in a veiled way (Obeng 1996). Other times, they are used to carry more weight in a discussion, a weak person is able to enlist the tradition of the ancestors to support his position, or even to argue a legal case. Proverbs can also be used to simply make a conversation/discussion more lively. In many parts of the world, the use of proverbs is a mark of being a good orator.

== Uses of paremiology ==
The study of proverbs has application in a number of fields. Clearly, those who study folklore and literature are interested in them, but scholars from a variety of fields have found ways to profitably incorporate the study of proverbs. For example, they have been used to study abstract reasoning of children, acculturation of immigrants, intelligence, the differing mental processes in mental illness, cultural themes, etc. Proverbs have also been incorporated into the strategies of social workers, teachers, preachers, and even politicians. (For the deliberate use of proverbs as a propaganda tool by Nazis, see Mieder 1982.)

There are collections of sayings that offer instructions on how to play certain games, such as dominoes (Borajo et al. 1990) and the Japanese board game go (Mitchell 2001). However, these are not prototypical proverbs in that their application is limited to one domain.

== Folklore ==
One of the most important developments in the study of proverbs (as in folklore scholarship more generally) was the shift to more ethnographic approaches in the 1960s. This approach attempted to explain proverb use in relation to the context of a speech event, rather than only in terms of the content and meaning of the proverb.

== Cognitive science ==
Another important development in scholarship on proverbs has been applying methods from cognitive science to understand the uses and effects of proverbs and proverbial metaphors in social relations.
