= Proverbium =

Academic journal covering the study of proverbs

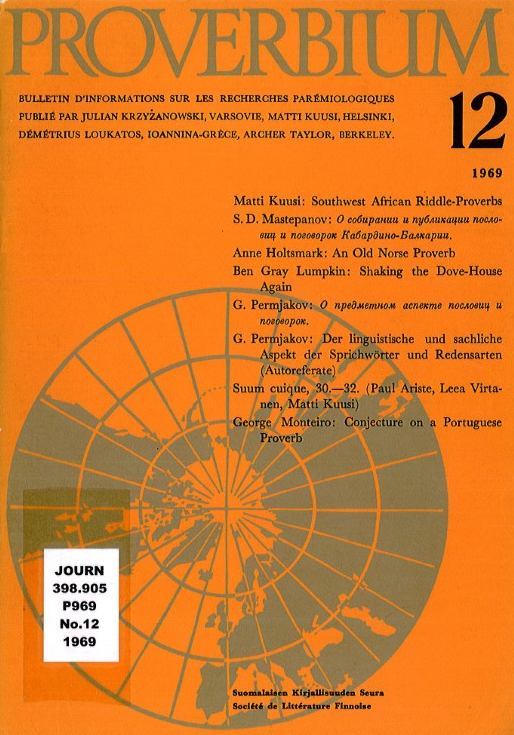
Cover of Proverbium, as published from 1965 to 1975

Cover of Proverbium, as published 1984–2021.

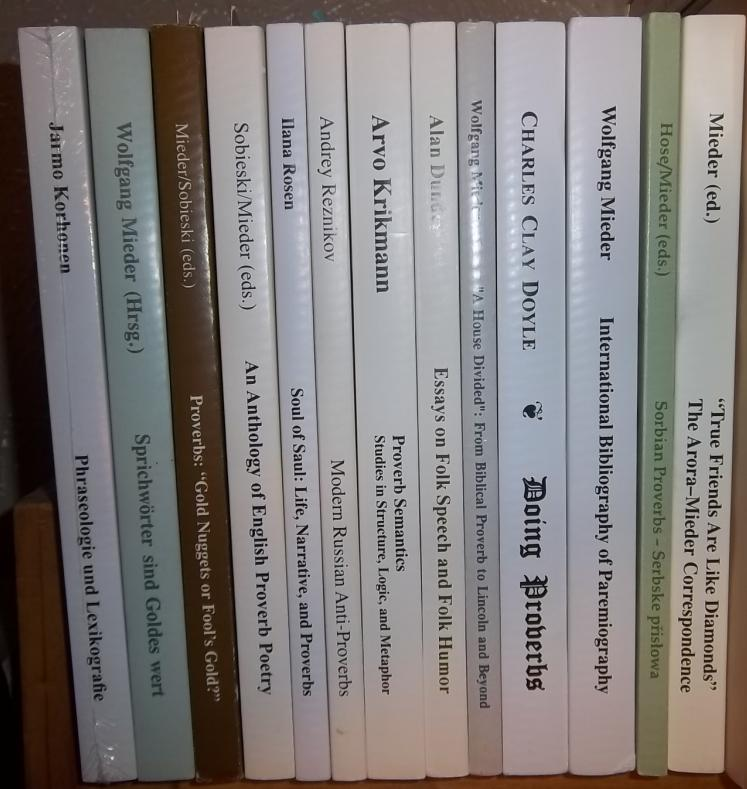
Sample books from the Proverbium Supplement Series, not in consecutive order.

Proverbium: Yearbook of International Proverb Scholarship is an academic journal covering paremiology, the study of proverbs. Each volume includes articles on proverbs and proverbial expressions, book reviews, a bibliography of recent proverb scholarship, and a list of recently (re)published proverb collections.

Volumes 1:1984 to 4:1987 were issued by the Ohio State University, in cooperation with the University of Vermont and The Hebrew University of Jerusalem. Volumes 5:1988 to 38:2021 were published exclusively by the University of Vermont. Volumes 1:1984 to 38:2021 of Proverbium were printed (ISSN 0743-782X). Many of the back issues of Proverbium are freely available online at HathiTrust. All volumes are now available on Proverbium's archive on the journal's website.

Wolfgang Mieder, a distinguished professor of German and folklore at the University of Vermont, is the founding editor of Proverbium: Yearbook of International Scholarship and served as editor-in-chief until 2021.

The annual yearbook series succeeded Proverbium: Bulletin d'Information sur les Recherches Parémiologiques (ISSN 0048-5667), which was established by Matti Kuusi and published occasionally by the Finnish Literature Society between 1965 and 1975. The earlier Finnish series and the succeeding annual volume format have been compared and praised by the Nigerian scholar J.O.J. Nwachukwu-Agbada.

The journal is one of two ongoing proverb journals listed as a significant source for proverb studies in Proverbs: a Handbook (page 258). It is also listed as one of a list of "Proverb Resources" by the Cog Web site. Also, it is the only current journal listed by the University of Chicago's Defining Wisdom project in their Wisdom Literature Review. It is one of only two journals cited by the International Association of Paremiology on their website. Until 2021 Proverbium was indexed by the MLA International Bibliography, RILM Abstracts of Music International, and Russian Academy of Sciences Bibliographies. From 2023 Proverbium is indexed in Scopus, Directory of Open Access Journals (DOAJ), ERIH PLUS, HRČAK and MLA Directory of Periodicals. Julia Sevilla Muñoz, editor of the journal Paremia, has described it saying, "Proverbium est devenu premier point de recontre et d'échange scientifique pour les vrais spécialistes en parémies." Two volumes of Proverbium were seen to be significant enough for a review in the journal Fabula.

In addition to the journal itself, there has been a print "Supplement Series" of volumes published by Proverbium. Forty-four volumes have been published in this book series as of 2020.

From volume 39:2022 Proverbium is published by the Faculty of Humanities and Social Sciences at the Josip Juraj Strossmayer University of Osijek, Croatia (ISSN 2806-7568). New volumes are freely available online. The journal's website gives access to all parts of the journal from 1984 onward. The new chief editors are Melita Aleksa Varga (Osijek, Croatia) and Hrisztalina Hrisztova-Gotthardt (Bottmingen, Switzerland). They also launched the Online Supplement Series of Proverbium: Yearbook of International Proverb Scholarship
