= Paraprosdokian =

Figure of speech

A paraprosdokian (/pærəprɒsˈdoʊkiən/), or par'hyponoian, is a figure of speech in which the latter part of a sentence, phrase, or larger discourse is surprising or unexpected in a way that causes the reader or listener to reframe or reinterpret the first part. It is frequently used for humorous or dramatic effect, sometimes producing an anticlimax. For this reason, it is extremely popular among comedians and satirists, such as Groucho Marx.

== Etymology ==
"Paraprosdokian" derives from Greek παρά "against" and προσδοκία "expectation". The noun prosdokia occurs with the preposition para in Greek rhetorical writers of the 1st century BCE and the 1st and 2nd centuries CE, with the meaning "contrary to expectation" or "unexpectedly."

While the word is now in wide circulation, "paraprosdokian" (or "paraprosdokia") is not a term of classical (or medieval) Greek or Latin rhetoric; it was first attested in 1896.

== Double meaning ==
Some paraprosdokians not only change the meaning of an early phrase, as in a garden-path sentence, but also play on the double meaning of a particular word, creating a form of syllepsis or antanaclasis (a type of pun).

For example, in response to the question "how are you two?", a Modern Hebrew speaker can say בסדר גמור; היא בסדר, אני גמור (be-séder gamúr; hi be-séder, aní gamúr), literally "in-order complete; she in-order, I complete", i.e., "We are very good. She is good, I am finished". Note the ambiguity of the Hebrew lexical item גמור gamúr: it means both "complete" and "finished". A parallel punning paraprosdokian in English is a man's response to a friend's question "Why are you and your wife here?: A workshop; I am working, she is shopping."

== Examples ==
- "If I could just say a few words … I'd be a better public speaker." —Homer Simpson
- "If I am reading this graph correctly—I'd be very surprised." —Stephen Colbert
- "If all the girls attending the Yale prom were laid end to end, I wouldn't be a bit surprised." —Dorothy Parker
- "On his feet he wore … blisters." —Aristotle
- "I've had a perfectly wonderful evening, but this wasn't it." —Groucho Marx
- "My uncle's dying wish was to have me sit in his lap; he was in the electric chair." —Rodney Dangerfield
- "I like going to the park and watching the children run around because they don't know I'm using blanks." —Emo Philips
- "I haven't slept for ten days, because that would be too long." —Mitch Hedberg
- "I sleep eight hours a day and at least ten at night." —Bill Hicks
- "On the other hand, you have different fingers." —Steven Wright
- "To wives and sweethearts! May they never meet." — Traditional toast made by Royal Navy officers.
- "I used to be indecisive. Now I'm not sure." —Tommy Cooper
- "Take my wife—please!" —Henny Youngman

== See also ==
- Anti-proverb
- List of linguistic example sentences
- One-line joke
- Garden-path sentence
