= Wellerism =

Type of witticism

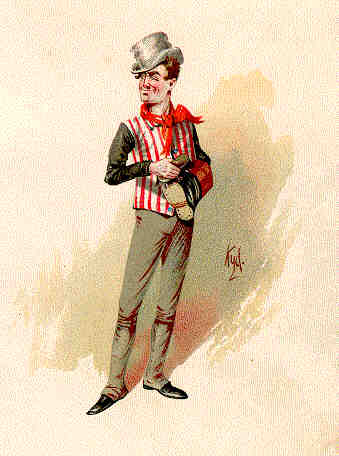
Sam Weller, from a watercolor by 'Kyd' c. 1890

Wellerisms, named after sayings of Sam Weller in Charles Dickens's novel The Pickwick Papers, make fun of established clichés and proverbs by showing that they are wrong in certain situations, often when taken literally. In this sense, Wellerisms that include proverbs are a type of anti-proverb. Typically a Wellerism consists of three parts: a proverb or saying, a speaker, and an often humorously literal explanation.

Some playwrights adapting Dickens' work have coined further examples.

A type of Wellerism called a Tom Swifty incorporates a speaker attribution that puns on the quoted statement.

== Examples from The Pickwick Papers ==
- "Then the next question is, what the devil do you want with me, as the man said, wen he see the ghost?"
- "Out vith it, as the father said to his child, when he swallowed a farden."
- "Wery glad to see you, indeed, and hope our acquaintance may be a long 'un, as the gen'l'm'n said to the fi' pun' note."
- "All good feelin', sir – the wery best intentions, as the gen'l'm'n said ven he run away from his wife 'cos she seemed unhappy with him."
- "There; now we look compact and comfortable, as the father said ven he cut his little boy's head off, to cure him o' squintin'."
- "Vich I call addin' insult to injury, as the parrot said ven they not only took him from his native land, but made him talk the English langwidge arterwards."
- "Sorry to do anythin' as may cause an interruption to such wery pleasant proceedin's, as the king said wen he dissolved the parliament."
- "Avay vith melincholly, as the little boy said ven his schoolmissus died".
- "Oh, quite enough to get, Sir, as the soldier said ven they ordered him three hundred and fifty lashes".

== English examples ==
- "A body can get used to anything, even to being hanged, as the Irishman said." (Lucy Maud Montgomery, Anne of Green Gables)
- "Au contraire, as the man said in the Bay of Biscay when asked if he had dined" (Dorothy L Sayers, The Unpleasantness at the Bellonna Club)

== Examples from other languages ==
Some researchers concentrate on Wellerisms found in English and European languages, but Alan Dundes documented them in the Yoruba language of Nigeria (Dundes 1964), with African scholars confirming and adding to his findings (Ojoade 1980, Opata 1988, 1990). Wellerisms are also common in many Ethiopian languages, including Guji Oromo, (where nine of 310 proverbs in a published collection are Wellerisms) and Alaaba (where about 10% of 418 proverbs were found to be quotations). They are also found in ancient Sumerian: "The fox, having urinated into the sea, said: 'The depths of the sea are my urine!'" Wellerism proverbs have now been documented across Africa, Europe, western and southern Asia, but in almost no languages of eastern Asia.

Antillean Creole French, Martinique:

- "Rabbit says, 'Eat everything, drink everything, but don't tell everything'."

Sumerian

- The horse, after he had thrown off his rider [said], "If my burden is always to be thus, I shall become weak."

== Choice of speaker ==
In a number of languages, especially in Africa, Wellerisms are formed with animals as the speaker. In some cases, the choice of the animal may not carry much significance. However, in some cases, such as in the Chumburung language of Ghana, the choice of the specific animal as speaker is a significant part of some proverbs, "chosen precisely for characteristics that illustrate the proverb... Chameleon says quickly quickly is good and slowly slowly is good." Kasena has a wellerism proverb where the chameleon's color adaptability is important, "The chameleon says, ‘When on a tree, assume the colour of its leaf.’” Similarly, there is an Ewe proverb that quotes an animal that is specifically appropriate to that Wellerism, "The chicken says that, it is because of humility that he bows down before entering its coop." Another example of a speaker being specifically chosen to go with the statement in a Wellerism is "The bat says that there is no difference between standing down and upright", from the Tiv language in Nigeria.

== Dialogue proverbs ==
Wellerisms are similar but not identical to dialogue proverbs, as shown by Kapchits and Unseth. Wellerisms contain the speech of one speaker, but dialogue proverbs contain direct speech from more than one. They are found in a number of languages, including Armenian, French, Georgian, Kasena of Ghana, and Pashto of Afghanistan and Pakistan.

- "They asked the camel, 'Why is your neck crooked?' The camel laughed roaringly, 'What of me is straight?'" Shor/Khakas (SW Siberia)
- "Let me go, Spider!" "How can I let go of my meat?" "Then get on with it, eat me!" "How can I eat a fly?" — Kasena
- "I have caught a bear." "Get rid of him." "I can't, he won't let me go." — Russian, Armenian
- The vulture says, "I'll shriek and the shepherd will forget," [and] the wolf says, "I'll eat the kid's tail." — Luri language of Iran

== See also ==
- Paraprosdokian
- Said the actress to the bishop
