= Anti-proverb =

Transformation of a standard proverb for humorous effect

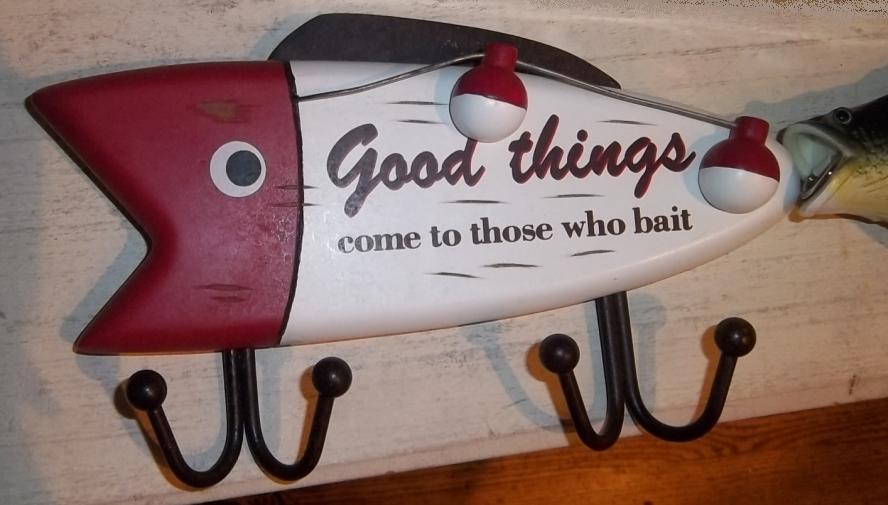
A fishing pun on the proverb "Good things come to those who wait."

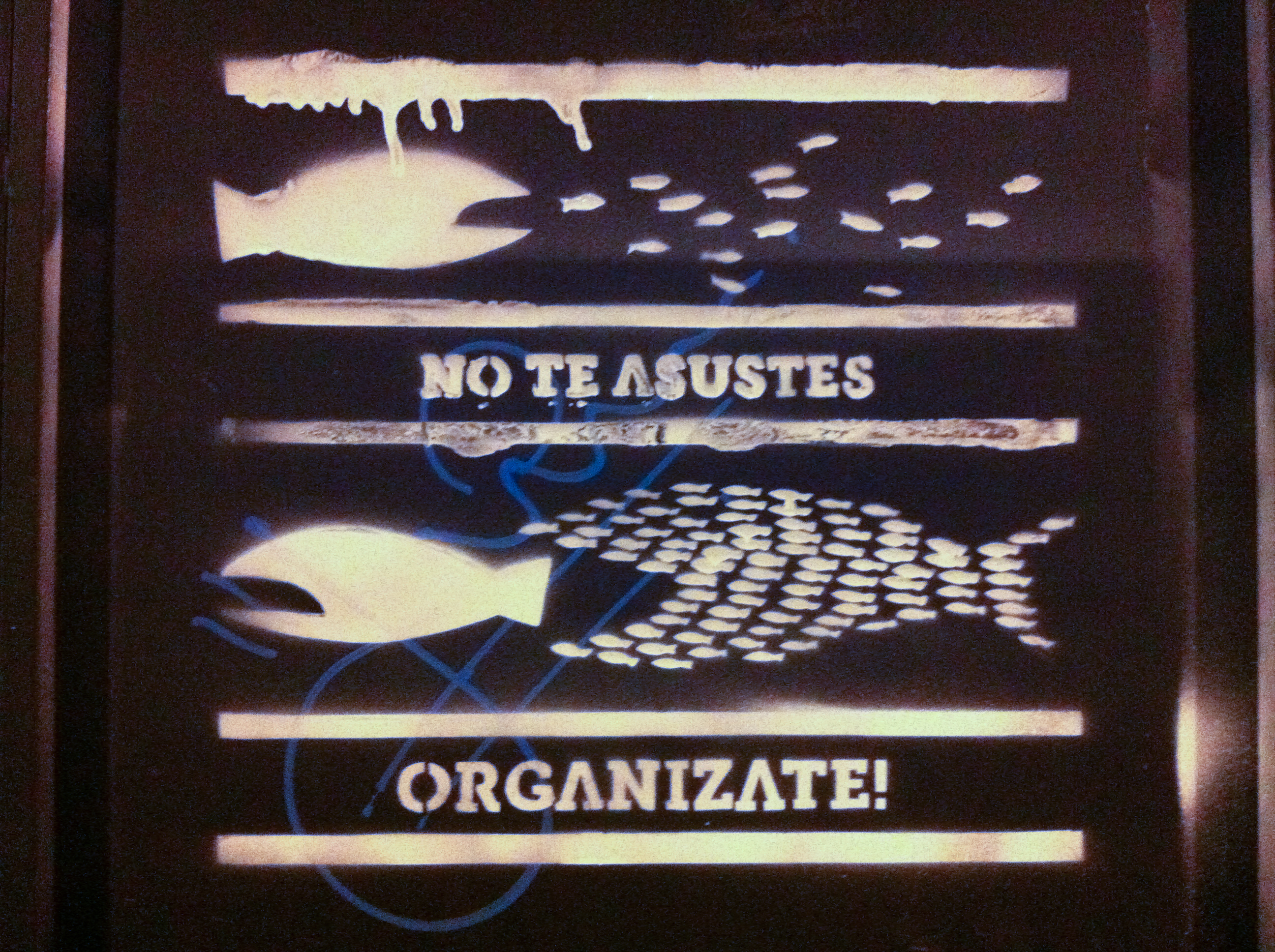
Graphic spoof on the proverbial concept of "big fish eat little fish", from Spanish context. (The text translates as "Don't panic, organize!")

An anti-proverb is the transformation of a standard proverb for humorous effect. Paremiologist Wolfgang Mieder defines them as "parodied, twisted, or fractured proverbs that reveal humorous or satirical speech play with traditional proverbial wisdom". Anti-proverbs are ancient, Aristophanes having used one in his play Peace, substituting κώẟων "bell" (in the unique compound "bellfinch") for κύων "bitch, female dog", twisting the standard and familiar "The hasty bitch gives birth to blind" to "The hasty bellfinch gives birth to blind".

Anti-proverbs have also been defined as "an allusive distortion, parody, misapplication, or unexpected contextualization of a recognized proverb, usually for comic or satiric effect". To have full effect, an anti-proverb must be based on a known proverb. For example, "If at first you don't succeed, quit" is only funny if the hearer knows the standard proverb "If at first you don't succeed, try, try again". Anti-proverbs are used commonly in advertising, such as "Put your burger where your mouth is" from the Red Robin restaurant chain. Anti-proverbs are also common on T-shirts, such as "Taste makes waist" and "If at first you don't succeed, skydiving is not for you".

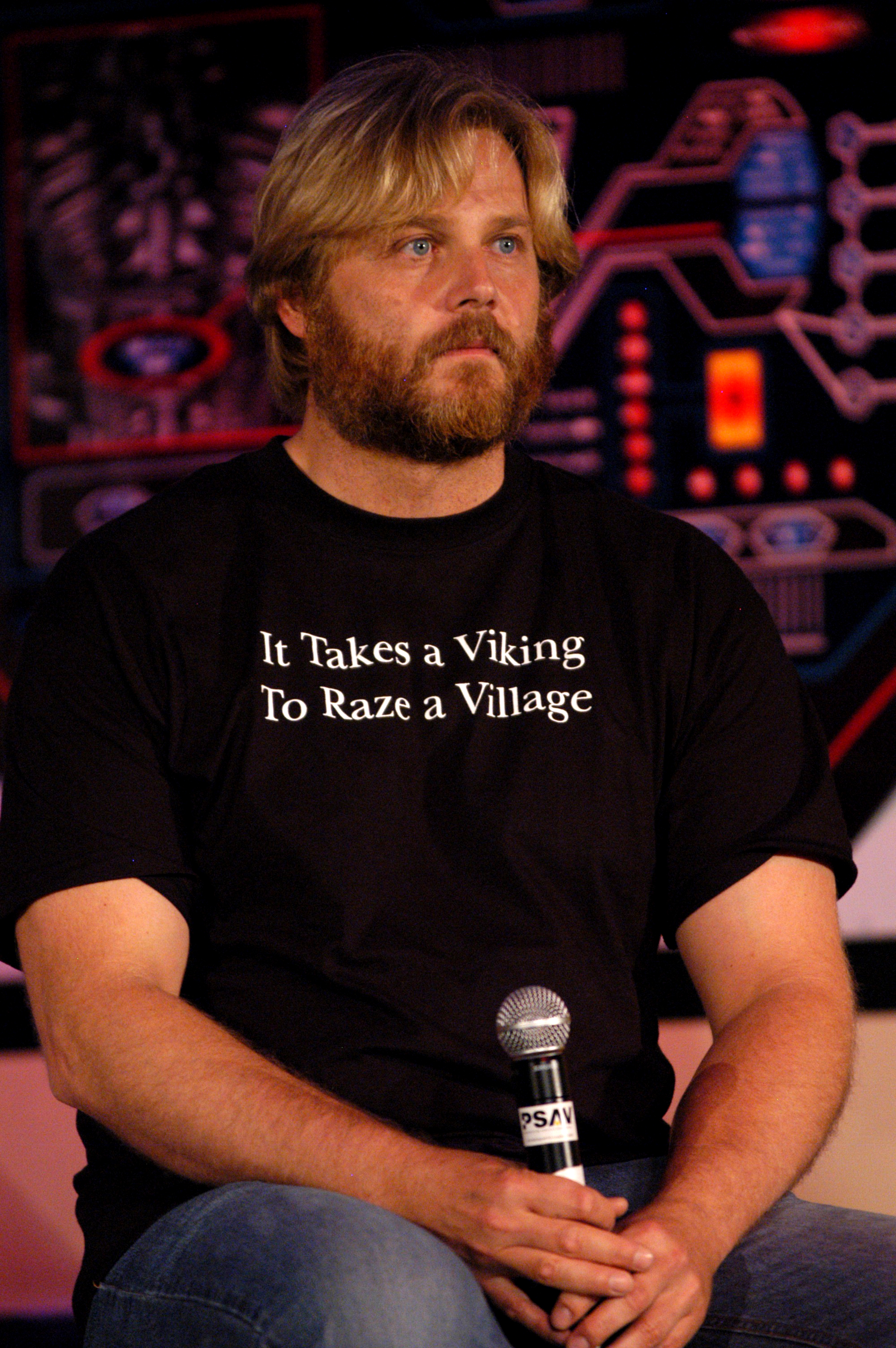
T-shirts are common sites for anti-proverbs

Standard proverbs are essentially defined phrases, well known to many people, as e. g. Don't bite the hand that feeds you. When this sequence is deliberately slightly changed ("Don't bite the hand that looks dirty") it becomes an anti-proverb. The relationship between anti-proverbs and proverbs, and a study of how much a proverb can be changed before the resulting anti-proverb is no longer seen as proverbial, are still open topics for research.

== Classification ==
There have been various attempts at classifying different types of anti-proverbs, based on structure and semantics, including by Mieder, Litovkina, and Valdeva. What follows is somewhat of a synthesis of these.

=== Classification on formal criteria ===
- Association: The similarity to the original sequence is strong enough to identify it, but there is no further connection: The early worm gets picked first.
1. Original phrase: The early bird gets the worm.
- Change of homonyms: A word which has several meanings is interpreted in a new way: Where there's a will, there's a lawsuit.
1. Original phrase: Where there's a will [motivation], there's a way [to accomplish a task].
2. Contrast this with the changed homonym phrase, which implies a highly contentious legal document ("will") that determines the distribution of an individual's possessions to other persons and groups upon the individual's death.
- Combination: Two sequences are combined: One brain washes the other.
1. Original phrases: One hand washes the other. and One [half of one] brain watches [complements, keeps "in check", verifies] the other.
- Permutation: While keeping the syntactic structure, the words are re-organized: A waist is a terrible thing to mind.
1. Original phrase: A mind is a terrible thing to waste, which means one of several things:
  1. "One should not become addicted to bad habits like drugs or losing sleep that destroy the ability to think in reasonable ways."
  2. "One should pursue an academic or intellectual job [such as an engineer, researcher, doctor] if they are smart.".
2. Contrast this with the permuted phrase, which means "One should not waste their time thinking about their body's waist and its shape or diameter".
- Abridgement: The sequence is cut and thus changed completely: All's well that ends.
1. Original phrase: All's well that ends well, meaning "Everything that ends with an okay result will also have the sequence of steps to achieve that end result be okay".
2. Contrast this with the abridged phrase, which means "Everything that ends [regardless of whether the final result is okay, and regardless of whether the intermediate steps taken are okay] is okay".
- Substitution: Parts of the sequence are replaced: Absence makes the heart go wander.
1. Original phrase: Absence makes the heart grow fonder.
2. Contrast this with the substituted phrase, which means "The person who has left causes the heart of the person who has stayed to try to find a new third person to enjoy"
- Supplementation: A sentence with a contrasting meaning is added to the original sequence: A man's home is his castle – let him clean it.
1. Original phrase: A man's home is his castle, meaning the man is a king, and as such, he should not have to do lowly peasant-class duties such as cleaning, cooking, and other chores.
- Syntactic change: The semantic structure of the sentence changes while the sequence of words stays the same: Men think: "God governs." – A good man will think of himself: after, all the others.
1. Original phrase: A good man will think of himself [only] after [thinking of] all [the] others.
2. Contrast this with the syntactically-changed phrase, which means "A good man will [first] think of himself [because he is selfish], and after he does so, he will then think of all the other people."

=== Classification on content criteria ===
- Mitigation: The meaning seems kept, but is qualified by the supplement: Everything has an end, but a sausage has two.
- Apology: The original sequence is defended against attacks: German example, translated: Art (Kunst) comes from 'able' (können), not from 'will' (wollen), or we'd better call it wirt (Wulst or Wunst, fantasy word).
- Conservation: The meaning is similar, with and without the supplement: There is no such thing as a free lunch, but there is always free cheese in a mousetrap.
- Break of metaphor: Metaphors are interpreted literally: Duty is calling? We call back.
- Neogenesis: The meaning of the new sentence is completely independent of the original one: An onion a day keeps everybody away.
- Satire: The meaning of the new sentence displays the original in a gruesome light: Where there is a whip, there is a way.

=== Types of humorous effects ===
- Bisociation: This is a technical term coined by Arthur Koestler. He says that a funny text is situated in two different semantic levels. In the beginning, the hearer or reader is aware of only one of them. The sudden and unexpected punch line is what makes this humorous. For example: I only want your best – your money.
- Destruction: This is where the saying is completely altered and has an opposite meaning, such as: Jesus may love you – but will he respect you in the morning?
- Fictional catastrophe: Catastrophes which are only made up or solved in one's mind might be humorous, as can be seen in the quotation: The light at the end of the tunnel is only muzzle flash. (Alternatives: The light at the end of the tunnel is the headlight of an oncoming train or The light at the end of the tunnel is the burglars' torch)

== History ==
Anti-proverbs have been used and recognized for a long time. The Greek musician Stratonicus of Athens used an anti-proverb to mock a cithara-singer who had been nicknamed "Ox". He twisted the standard Greek proverb "The ass hears the lyre", replacing the first word to produce "The Ox hears the lyre."

However, the term "anti-proverb" was not coined until 1982 by Wolfgang Mieder. The term became more established with the publication of Twisted Wisdom: Modern Anti-Proverbs by Wolfgang Mieder and Anna T. Litovkina.

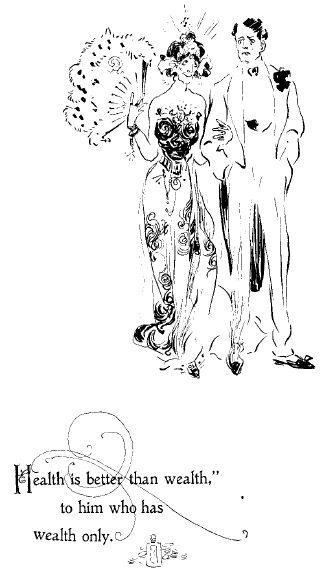
An anti-proverb, formed by adding an unexpected cynical phrase to the end, with an apropos cartoon

They were one of the many experimental styles explored by the French literary movement Oulipo. The synonym perverb is attributed to Maxine Groffsky. The concept was popularised by Oulipo collaborator Harry Mathews in his Selected Declarations of Dependence (1977).

Anti-proverbs have been alternatively named "postproverbials" by Aderemi Raji-Oyelade, (also known by his pen name, Remi Raji). This term has been adopted by some African proverb scholars, seen in a large collection of articles about antiproverbs/postproverbials in the journal Matatu 51,2, edited by Aderemi Raji-Oyelade and Olayinka Oyeleye.

== In literature ==
Some authors have bent and twisted proverbs, creating anti-proverbs, for a variety of literary effects. For example, in the Harry Potter novels, J. K. Rowling reshapes a standard English proverb into "It's no good crying over spilt potion" and Professor Dumbledore advises Harry not to "count [his] owls before they are delivered".

From Nigeria, Adeyemi shows the use of both proverbs and anti-proverbs in Rérẹ́ Rún by Okediji. Adeyemi believes that they add humor, color and beauty to his writing. But on a political plane, he believes "Anti-proverbs were also used to stimulate critical consciousness in the readers to fight for their rights but with wisdom. The conclusion of the paper was that the conscious manipulation of the so-called fixed proverbs could generate new proverbs, encourage creativity in the writers and expose hidden meanings of proverbs."

In a slightly different use of reshaping proverbs, in the Aubrey–Maturin series of historical naval novels by Patrick O'Brian, Capt. Jack Aubrey humorously mangles and mis-splices proverbs, such as "Never count the bear's skin before it is hatched" and "There's a good deal to be said for making hay while the iron is hot." An earlier fictional splicer of proverb is a character found in a novel by Beatrice Grimshaw, producing such combinations as "Make hay while the iron is hot" (very similar to an example from Capt. Aubrey) and "They lock the stable door when the milk is spilt".

Part of G. K. Chesterton’s reputation as the "Prince of Paradoxes" rested on his ability to turn proverbs and clichés on their heads. One example of this facility occurs in his What’s Wrong with the World: Arguing that the education of children is better left to their mothers than to professional educators, he ends his argument with, "... [I]f a thing is worth doing, it is worth doing badly." Commenting on this, Dale Ahlquist in the Society of Gilbert Keith Chesterton blog, argues that there is considerable good sense in this paradoxical anti-proverb. He cites Chesterton’s own remark that "Paradox has been defined as 'Truth standing on her head to get attention'", and notes that Chesterton in the same passage explicitly concedes that there are things, like astronomy, that need to be done very well; whereas when it comes to writing love letters or blowing one’s nose, Chesterton argues that, "These things we want a man to do for himself, even if he does them badly."

== Variations ==
=== Splicing two proverbs ===
In a slightly different pattern of reshaping proverbs humorously, pieces of multiple proverbs can be spliced together, e.g. "Never count the bear's skin before it is hatched" and "There's a good deal to be said for making hay while the iron is hot."

The phrase de gustibus non disputandum est ('In matters of taste, there can be no disputes') is misquoted in Act I of Anton Chekhov's play The Seagull. The character Shamrayev conflates it with the phrase de mortuis nil nisi bonum (in its alternative form: de mortuis, aut bene aut nihil: "of the dead, either [speak] good or [say] nothing"), resulting in de gustibus aut bene, aut nihil ('Let nothing be said of taste but what is good'.

=== Garden path proverbs ===
The term has also been used to describe a garden path sentence based on a proverb; namely, a sentence that starts out like the proverb, but ends in such a way that the listener is forced to back up and re-parse several words in order to get its real sense:

- Time flies like to fly around clocks.
  ("time flies like an arrow" / the habits of "time flies", a fictitious kind of fly.)

Proverbs beginning with Time flies like ... are popular examples in linguistics, e.g. to illustrate concepts related to syntax parsing. These examples are presumably inspired by the quip "Time flies like the wind; fruit flies like a banana", attributed to Groucho Marx.

To be effective in written form, a garden-path proverb must have the same spelling and punctuation as the original proverb, up to the point where the reader is supposed to back up, as in the "time flies" example above. These spelling or punctuation constraints may be relaxed in anti-proverbs that are spoken, rather than written:

- Don't count your chickens will do it for you.
  ("don't count your chickens before they hatch" / "don't count, your chickens will ...")
- Think before you were born you were already loved.
  ("think before you act" / "think: before you were born, you were ...")
- You can't teach an old dog would be better for your students.
  ("you can't teach an old dog new tricks" / "you can't teach; an old dog would be ...")

=== Proverbs with surprising or silly endings ===
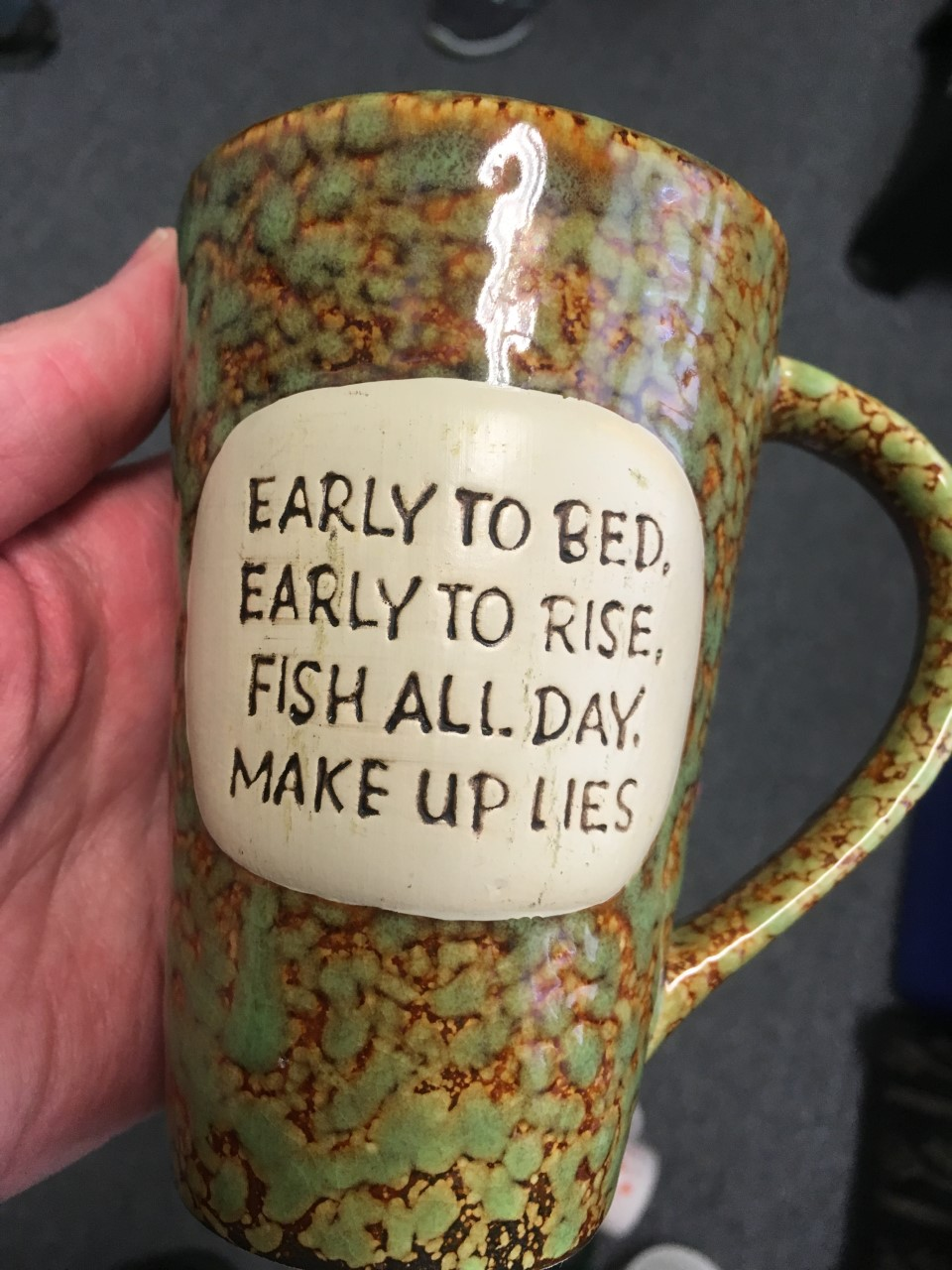
Proverb with twisted ending

The term is also used in the weaker sense of any proverb that was modified to have an unexpected, dumb, amusing, or nonsensical ending—even if the changed version is no harder to parse than the original:

- A rolling stone gathers momentum.
  ("A rolling stone gathers no moss".)
- All that glitters is not dull.
  ("All that glitters is not gold".)
- Don't put the cart before the aardvark.
  ("Don't put the cart before the horse".)
- A penny saved is a penny taxed.
  ("A penny saved is a penny earned".)

=== Puns on a proverb ===
The word has also been used for puns on proverbs:

- Slaughter is the best medicine.
  ("Laughter is the best medicine".)
- What doesn't kill you makes you stranger.
  ("What doesn't kill you makes you stronger".)
- Nothing succeeds like excess.
  ("Nothing succeeds like success".)
- Levity is the soul of wit.
  ("Brevity is the soul of wit".)
- Absinthe makes the heart grow fonder / Absence makes the heart go wander.
  ("Absence makes the heart grow fonder".)

== See also ==
- List of proverbial phrases
- Malapropism
- Paraprosdokian
- Transpositional pun
- Wellerism
