= Military Writers Society of America =

The Military Writers Society of America (MWSA) is a nonprofit, 501(c)(3) organization composed of authors, poets, and artists, including U.S. military veterans and their family members. Membership is open to individuals with an interest in or connection to the military.

The organization provides opportunities for members to connect with other writers and artists, exchange ideas, and develop their knowledge of writing and publishing. Its objectives include improving members' writing skills, promoting writing through outreach to schools, military organizations, and veterans' groups, and recognizing achievements in literature and the communication arts.

MWSA conducts an annual review and awards program recognizing books and other creative works across multiple genres. Award recipients are typically announced during a banquet held in conjunction with the organization's annual membership conference.

The organization's membership includes both emerging and established writers. Notable members have included authors Joe Buff, Gayle Lynds, Dale Dye, and Joseph Badal.

== History ==
The Military Writers Society of America (MWSA) was founded by William H. "Bill" McDonald Jr., a Vietnam War veteran and author who served as the organization's first president. McDonald served as a crew chief and door gunner aboard UH-1D Huey helicopters with the 128th Helicopter Assault Company, based at Phu Loi, South Vietnam, from 1966 to 1967. His military decorations included the Distinguished Flying Cross, Bronze Star, fourteen Air Medals, and Purple Heart.

Following his military service, McDonald began writing about his wartime experiences. His interest in documenting military service led him to connect with other veterans and writers who explored their experiences through fiction, nonfiction, poetry, and art. He established MWSA to provide a community for military-affiliated writers and to support the publication and preservation of their work.

MWSA initially operated as a branch of the American Authors Association (AAA) before becoming an independent organization. The organization subsequently developed an annual awards program recognizing literary and creative works, including books, music, and short films.

Following McDonald's departure from the presidency for health reasons, Tony Lazzarini, a Vietnam War combat veteran, became MWSA's second president. Lazzarini previously worked for IBM as a service technician before establishing an automotive business. He later founded Voyager Publishing and pursued writing, theater, and filmmaking.

Joyce Faulkner also served as president of MWSA. A member since 2006, Faulkner worked as a ghostwriter, editor, and publication designer. Her interest in preserving veterans' accounts was reflected in her book In the Shadow of Suribachi, which recounts her father's experiences as a Marine during the Battle of Iwo Jima.

Other presidents have included Dwight Zimmerman and Bob Doerr.

== Literary awards ==
The Military Writers Society of America presents literary awards in multiple categories. The following tables list medal recipients for selected years.

=== 2018 Award Winners ===
The Military Writers Society of America (MWSA) announced its 2018 literary award recipients during an awards banquet at the Hilton Garden Inn in Mount Pleasant, South Carolina. Recipients are listed below by category, medal, book title, and author.

2018 MWSA Literary Award Winners
Category	Medal	Book	Author
Children & Young Adult—Picture Book	Silver	Eddie and Bingo: Destination Christmas	Kathleen and Katherine Taylor
Children & Young Adult—Picture Book	Silver	My Dad Got Hurt. What Can I Do?	Brunella Costagliola
Children & Young Adult—Picture Book	Silver	my daddy is a sailor	Tahna Desmond Fox
Children & Young Adult—Picture Book	Silver	My Daddy Sleeps Everywhere	Jesse Franklin
Children's Chapter Book	Gold	Jacqueline	Jackie Minniti
Collections—Anthology	Silver	Love, Sweet to Spicy	Corrales Writing Group
Collections—Religious/Spiritual	Silver	Holy in the Moment	Ginger Harrington
Historical Fiction	Bronze	Uncommon Bond	John House
History	Gold	The Shadow Tiger	William C McDonald III & Barbara L. Evenson
History	Gold	Tiger Bravo's War	Rick St John
History	Silver	Air Force One	Nicholas Veronico
History	Silver	Blades of Thunder	W. Larry Dandridge
History	Silver	Chopper Heroes	William Peterson
History	Silver	The Solomons Campaigns	William L. McGee
History	Bronze	Wonderful Flying Machines	Barrett Beard
Horror/Fantasy/Sci Fi	Silver	Tested	Connie Cockrell
How to/Business/Self Help	Silver	Hal Moore on Leadership	Harold G. Moore
Literary Fiction	Gold	Syllables of Rain	D.S. Lliteras
Literary Fiction	Silver	The Perfection of Valor	Bob Mustin
Literary Fiction	Bronze	Flowers from Afghanistan	Suzy Parish
Memoir/Biography	Gold	Marcel's Letters	Carolyn Porter
Memoir/Biography	Gold	Racing Back to Vietnam	John Pendergrass
Memoir/Biography	Silver	Heroes to the End	Jim Smith
Memoir/Biography	Bronze	Kanaga Diary	Estelle Lauer
Memoir/Biography	Bronze	Through Smoke-Teared Eyes	Johnny F. Pugh
Mystery/Thriller	Gold	Land of Wolves	Tj Turner
Mystery/Thriller	Gold	Soft Target	John D Trudel
Mystery/Thriller	Gold	The Consultant	Tj O'Connor
Mystery/Thriller	Silver	Homeland Burning	Brinn Colenda
Mystery/Thriller	Silver	Into a Dark Frontier	John Mangan
Mystery/Thriller	Silver	Sins of the Fathers	Joseph Badal
Pictorial/Coffee Table	Gold	Lighthouses of America	Tom Beard
Poetry—Poetry Book	Gold	War in the Company of Medics	John J. Candelaria
Poetry—Poetry Book	Bronze	Vietnam Voices	Michael Lepore
Reference	Silver	The Wicked Problem of Cultural Heritage and Conflict	Christopher Herndon and Joris Kila
Reference	Bronze	African American Warrant Officers	Farrell Chiles
Reference	Bronze	Bradley vs. BMP	Mike Guardia
Young Adult (Fiction of Non-Fiction)	Silver	Sebastian's Tale	Dylan Weisse

=== 2026 Award Winners ===
The Military Writers Society of America (MWSA) announced its 2026 literary award recipients during an awards banquet in Orlando, Florida. Recipients are listed below by category, medal, book title, and author.

2026 MWSA Literary Award Winners
Category	Medal	Book	Author
Anthology/Collection	Silver	Unbreaking the Circle - Stories of Service	Contributing SouthWest Writers Authors, Dan Wetmore (editor)
Chapter Book	Bronze	Stronger Together	A.L. Zeine
Historical Fiction	Gold	Both Sides of the Pond, My Family's War: 1933-1946	Barbara Kent Lawrence
Historical Fiction	Gold	Codename: Parsifal	Martin Roy Hill
Historical Fiction	Gold	Perilous Shores	Thomas M. Wing
Historical Fiction	Gold	The Mapmaker: A Novel of World War II	Tom Young
Historical Fiction	Gold	When Heroes Flew: Black Thursday	H. W. "Buzz" Bernard
Historical Fiction	Silver	Hatfield 1677	Laura C. Rader
Historical Fiction	Silver	Sheltering Angel of Belleau Wood	Louella Bryant
Historical Fiction	Silver	The Tide Waits for No Woman	Richard K Perkins
Historical Fiction	Bronze	A Gamble on Liberty	Robert W Smith
History	Gold	Hill 119, Defending a Reconnaissance Marines' OP, Vietnam 1969-70	Colonel Michael O Fallon USMC (Ret)
History	Silver	Forged in Fire: Grief, Purpose, and Devotion of a Woman at War	Robert L. Gangwere
History	Silver	Images of America Grand County	Penny Rafferty Hamilton, Ph.D.
History	Silver	On Board the USS Boise in World War II: The Battles and Secret Missions of Light Cruiser CL-47	Ian S. Bertram
History	Bronze	Sirens in the Loop - A History of the City News Bureau of Chicago	Paul Zimbrakos / James Elsener
Horror/Fantasy/Sci Fi	Gold	Guard in the Garden	Z.S. Diamanti
Horror/Fantasy/Sci Fi	Silver	Seeker	Glenn S. Robertson
How to/Business/Self Help	Gold	College Finances for Military Families	Kate Horrell
How to/Business/Self Help	Gold	Disaster and Emergency Preparedness Checklist	Captain Steven J. Craig, USCGR Retired
How to/Business/Self Help	Gold	Helm & Horizon: Daily Leadership Principles for the Motivated Sailor	Steven-Paul Lapid, USN (Ret.)
How to/Business/Self Help	Gold	Leadership is Tough: Skills. Decisions. Disciplines. What Great Leaders Do Differently	Mary Kelly and Peter Stark
How to/Business/Self Help	Gold	New Mission: Your Career Transition	Walter Nowocin
How to/Business/Self Help	Gold	The Four Stars of Leadership: Scientifically-Derived Principles from the Experiences of America's Highest-Ranking Leaders	Tom Collins, MD, MS
How to/Business/Self Help	Bronze	Learning to Live from Those Willing to Die	David E. Grogan
How to/Business/Self Help	Bronze	The Art of Leadership	David Ocheltree
Literary Fiction	Silver	Always On My Mind	Bob Every
Literary Fiction	Silver	The Whispers of War	Sarah L. Peachey
Memoir/Biography	Gold	I'm Alive: A Young Fighter Pilot's Diary of the US Navy Air War in Vietnam, 1964 to 1965	Errol F. Reilly; Kevin Callahan; Christopher P. Callahan
Memoir/Biography	Gold	Scattered, Smothered, and Covered: A Memoir of Resilience	Sandra Tow
Memoir/Biography	Gold	The Legacy of the Twins Platoon	Christy Sauro Jr
Memoir/Biography	Gold	The Resurrected Pirate: The Life, Death, and Subsequent Career of the Notorious George Lowther	Craig S. Chapman
Memoir/Biography	Silver	Broken Destiny: The story of Sergeant William M. O’Loughlin, United States Army Air Force	Mark Verwiel & Mario Acevedo
Memoir/Biography	Silver	Camouflage: How I Emerged from the Shadows of a Military Marriage	Heather Sweeney
Memoir/Biography	Silver	Disgracefully Easy: A B-24 Pilot's Letters Home	William Hanchett with Thomas F. Hanchett
Memoir/Biography	Silver	Fatal Second Helen: A Modern Veteran's Iliad	Josh Cannon
Memoir/Biography	Silver	Fugitive Son	Aramis Calderon
Memoir/Biography	Silver	Grunt 0311 Reflections of a Marine Rifleman	George P Berg
Memoir/Biography	Silver	Kick the Tires and Light the Fires: My Life as a Naval Aviator, FAA Test Pilot & Aviation Consultant	David Paul West with Ron Martz
Memoir/Biography	Silver	Waiting at the Red Gate	Weston Roudebush
Memoir/Biography	Bronze	Colored Pebbles	Del Staecker
Memoir/Biography	Bronze	Crazyhorse: Flying Apache Attack Helicopters with the 1st Cavalry Division in Iraq, 2006–2007	Daniel M McClinton
Memoir/Biography	Bronze	Jungle Ghosts: Walking Point in Vietnam	Ed Mann
Memoir/Biography	Bronze	Knowing My Father: The Collision of the OB Jennings and War Knight	Col. Joseph R. Tedeschi, US Army (Ret)
Memoir/Biography	Bronze	Pig Fat Soup: How I Survived My USS Pueblo Prisoner of War Journey	Steven Woelk, Robert Lofthouse
Memoir/Biography	Bronze	Unlearning What Worked	Matthew West-James
Mystery/Thriller/Crime	Gold	Arctic Red	James Bultema
Mystery/Thriller/Crime	Gold	Assassin's Mace, A Jake Palmer Novel	Ron McManus
Mystery/Thriller/Crime	Gold	Home for the Homicides	Rosalie Spielman
Mystery/Thriller/Crime	Gold	Sacred Plunder	Phillip Daigle
Mystery/Thriller/Crime	Gold	The Vatican Deal	Michael Balter
Mystery/Thriller/Crime	Silver	Jones Point	Sean Hagerty
Mystery/Thriller/Crime	Silver	Project Darkheart: a Black Spear novel	Benjamin Spada
Mystery/Thriller/Crime	Silver	Stealing Stealth	Brian L. Reece
Mystery/Thriller/Crime	Silver	Target Kyiv	J. M. Taylor
Mystery/Thriller/Crime	Silver	Task Force Thunderbolt	Galen D. Peterson
Mystery/Thriller/Crime	Silver	The Big Bad	Brad Huestis
Mystery/Thriller/Crime	Silver	The Gotland Deception	James Rosone
Mystery/Thriller/Crime	Silver	The Organization: Operative Nova	Daniel C. Davis
Mystery/Thriller/Crime	Silver	The Suwalki Crisis	James Rosone
Mystery/Thriller/Crime	Bronze	Dances with Arrows	Steve Stratton
Mystery/Thriller/Crime	Bronze	Invaders of the Heartland	James Bultema
Mystery/Thriller/Crime	Bronze	Savage Remorse	Macklin Grey
Mystery/Thriller/Crime	Bronze	Soulless	Joseph Badal
Pictorial/Coffee Table	Gold	Raiding the Rising Sun: The Doolittle Raid-America Strikes Back; An Illustrated Day-By-Day Account	Dan Steelman
Picture Book	Silver	George Eaton's Odd Granny (Rode a Pig Home Yesterday)	Nancy Panko
Picture Book	Silver	Veteran Adventure Stories: Charlie Plumb	Stephanie Hennessy
Picture Book	Silver	Veteran Adventure Stories: Gregory Gadson	Stephanie Hennessy
Poetry Book	Silver	I Remember You: Between memory and silence, a voice remains	Patrick J Hughes
Religious/Spiritual	Bronze	Coherent Chaos: The Unity Paradox...	A. Quinn Stanley, Ph.D.
Romance	Silver	Into The Mist	L.K. Aldrich
Romance	Silver	Viking	Brilee Scott
Romance	Bronze	Where There's Smoke: A Texas Love Story	Rees Walther
Young Adult (fiction or non-fiction)	Gold	Along the Trail	Kaci Curtis
Young Adult (fiction or non-fiction)	Silver	Hilo Dome	Jack Bartley
