= Shadow and Flame =

- The Lord of the Rings: The Rings of Power episode
- Cover art for the episode's soundtrack album
- Episode no.: Season 2 Episode 8
- Directed by: Charlotte Brändström
- Written by: J. D. Payne; Patrick McKay
- Cinematography by: Alex Disenhof
- Editing by: Andy Morrison
- Original release date: October 3, 2024
- Running time: 74 minutes

Additional cast
- Kevin Eldon as Narvi; Gavi Singh Chera as Merimac; Tanya Moodie as Gundabale Earthauler; Ema Horvath as Eärien; Will Keen as Belzagar; Nia Towle as Estrid; Leon Wadham as Kemen; Sam Hazeldine as Adar; Rory Kinnear as Tom Bombadil; Zates Atour as Brânk; Peter Landi as Marmadas; William Chubb as the High Priest of Númenor; Robert Strange as Glûg; Gabriel Akuwudike as Hagen; Murray McArthur as Ammred; Thomas Gilbey as Drúv; Stuart Bowman as Barduk; Charlie Rix as Vorohil

Episode chronology
← Previous "Doomed to Die"	Next → —
- The Lord of the Rings: The Rings of Power season 2

"Shadow and Flame" is the eighth and final episode of the second season of the American fantasy television series The Lord of the Rings: The Rings of Power, which is based on J. R. R. Tolkien's history of Middle-earth. It was written by showrunners J. D. Payne and Patrick McKay, and directed by Charlotte Brändström.

The series is set thousands of years before Tolkien's novel The Lord of the Rings (1954–55), during the Second Age of Middle-earth. This episode reveals that the Stranger (Daniel Weyman) is actually the Wizard Gandalf from Tolkien's works. Filming for the second season took place in the United Kingdom and on location in the Canary Islands from October 2022 to June 2023.

"Shadow and Flame" premiered on the streaming service Amazon Prime Video on October 3, 2024. It was estimated to have high viewership and received generally positive reviews, with praise for the performances and visuals but mixed thoughts on other aspects, including the Gandalf reveal. The episode received two award nominations.

== Background ==
The Lord of the Rings: The Rings of Power is based on J. R. R. Tolkien's history of Middle-earth. It is set thousands of years before his novels The Hobbit (1937) and The Lord of the Rings (1954–55). While it is contractually not a continuation of Peter Jackson's The Lord of the Rings (2001–2003) and The Hobbit (2012–2014) film trilogies, it is intended to be visually consistent with them. J. D. Payne and Patrick McKay were hired to develop the series and serve as its showrunners. Production moved from New Zealand to the United Kingdom starting with the second season, which was directed by Charlotte Brändström, Sanaa Hamri, and Louise Hooper.

The series covers the major events of Middle-earth's Second Age. Amazon did not acquire the rights to Tolkien's main Second Age writings, so the writers identified references to the period in The Hobbit, The Lord of the Rings, and the latter's appendices, and created a story that bridges those passages. The Second Age begins after the defeat of the "Dark Lord" Morgoth, when his army of Orcs are scattered and his lieutenant Sauron is in hiding. The large cast of characters includes Elves, Dwarves, Men, and Harfoots, the last being precursors to the diminutive Hobbits from The Hobbit and The Lord of the Rings. In the first season, Sauron disguises himself as the human "Halbrand" and deceives the Elves into creating three Rings of Power, while the Orcs use the eruption of Mount Doom to create their own realm, the dark land of Mordor.

== Plot ==
Dwarf prince Durin IV confronts his father, King Durin III, as he opens a large mithril deposit under Khazad-dûm. The Balrog that lives below the mine, awoken by this activity, attacks Durin III. He leaves his Ring of Power to Durin IV and names him the new king before fighting back as the entrance to the cavern collapses.

The Stranger goes to the Stoors' canyon in the eastern land of Rhûn to save his Harfoot friends Nori Brandyfoot and Poppy Proudfellow from the Dark Wizard. When the Stranger rejects his offer to supplant Sauron, the Dark Wizard destroys the canyon. The Stoors, who refer to the Stranger as "Grand Elf", are forced to find a new home and are joined by Nori and Poppy. The Stranger takes a fallen branch as his magic staff and returns to the mysterious Tom Bombadil, now knowing that his name will be "Gandalf".

Ar-Pharazôn, the king of Númenor, learns from the palantír seeing stone that Halbrand was Sauron. He accuses former Queen Regent Míriel of aligning herself with Sauron and has her Faithful followers arrested for treason. Despite following Ar-Pharazôn to this point, Eärien warns her father Elendil and he avoids capture. Míriel refuses to abandon the city, gives Elendil the sword Narsil, and tells him to reclaim his lordship in Númenor's west.

Ar-Pharazôn's son Kemen claims Pelargir as a military outpost for Númenor and tells the Low Men living there that they must cut down the forest in exchange for shelter and supplies. Elendil's son Isildur and Estrid acknowledge their feelings for one another, but Kemen does not allow her to go to Númenor. Isildur leaves Estrid with her betrothed, Hagen.

As Orcs overrun Eregion, Sauron tortures and kills Elf-smith Celebrimbor in search of the nine Rings of Power he created for Men. Galadriel escapes from the city with the rings and finds Orc leader Adar with her own ring, Nenya, which has revealed his original Elf-form. He returns the ring to her before he is killed by disillusioned Orcs. Sauron attacks Galadriel and takes the nine rings, but she steps off a cliff before he can take Nenya. Durin IV sends his army to aid the Elves, allowing survivors to escape to a nearby valley. Elrond and Gil-galad use the Elven rings to heal Galadriel, and the Elves resolve to stand against Sauron's new Orc army.

== Production ==
=== Writing ===
"Shadow and Flame" was written by Payne and McKay. The title is an allusion to a line in Jackson's films that references the Balrog: "The dwarves delved too greedily and too deep. You know what they awoke in the darkness of Khazad-dûm... shadow and flame."

=== Casting ===
The series' cast includes Cynthia Addai-Robinson as Míriel, Robert Aramayo as Elrond, Owain Arthur as Durin IV, Maxim Baldry as Isildur, Morfydd Clark as Galadriel, Ismael Cruz Córdova as Arondir, Charles Edwards as Celebrimbor, Trystan Gravelle as Ar-Pharazôn, Ciarán Hinds as the Dark Wizard, Markella Kavenagh as Elanor "Nori" Brandyfoot, Tyroe Muhafidin as Theo, Peter Mullan as Durin III, Sophia Nomvete as Disa, Lloyd Owen as Elendil, Megan Richards as Poppy Proudfellow, Charlie Vickers as Sauron, Benjamin Walker as Gil-galad, and Daniel Weyman as the Stranger. Also starring in the episode are Kevin Eldon as Narvi, Gavi Singh Chera as Merimac, Tanya Moodie as Gundabale Earthauler, Ema Horvath as Eärien, Will Keen as Belzagar, Nia Towle as Estrid, Leon Wadham as Kemen, Sam Hazeldine as Adar, Rory Kinnear as Tom Bombadil, Zates Atour as Brânk, Peter Landi as Marmadas, William Chubb as the High Priest of Númenor, Robert Strange as Glûg, Gabriel Akuwudike as Hagen, Murray McArthur as Ammred, Thomas Gilbey as Drúv, Stuart Bowman as Barduk, and Charlie Rix as Vorohil. Anthony Skrimshire, John Macdonald, Billy Mansell, Rupert Fawcett, and Jonny James play unnamed Orcs in the episode.

=== Filming ===
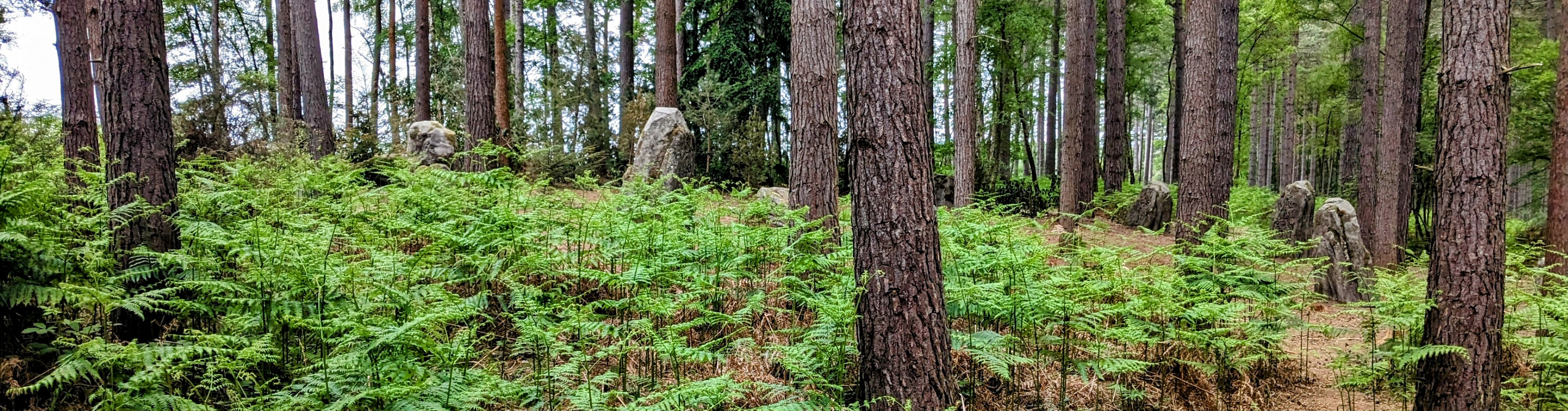
Fake stones were added to Swinley Forest near Ascot, Berkshire, for the climactic fight sequence.

Filming for the season began on October 3, 2022, under the working title LBP. Episodes were shot simultaneously based on the availability of locations and sets. Brändström directed "Shadow and Flame". Alex Disenhof was the cinematographer for her episodes, returning from the first season. The production wrapped in early June 2023.

=== Visual effects ===
Visual effects for the episode were created by Industrial Light & Magic (ILM), DNEG, Outpost VFX, Rodeo FX, The Yard VFX, Midas VFX, Monsters Aliens Robots Zombies, Untold Studios, Atomic Arts, Cantina Creative. The different vendors were overseen by visual effects supervisor Jason Smith.

=== Music ===
The Lord of the Rings: The Rings of Power (Season Two, Episode Eight: Shadow and Flame – Amazon Original Series Soundtrack)

Film score by Bear McCreary
- Released: October 3, 2024
- Genres: Orchestra; choir; world
- Length: 56:00
- Languages: English; Constructed languages
- Labels: Amazon; Mutant

Bear McCreary chronology
Doomed to Die (2024)	Shadow and Flame (2024)	Outlander: Season 7 (2024)

A soundtrack album featuring composer Bear McCreary's score was released digitally on October 3, 2024, containing "virtually every second of score" from the episode. A CD featuring the episode's music is included in a limited edition box set collection for the season from Mutant and McCreary's label Sparks & Shadows. The box set was announced in October 2025, and includes a journal written by McCreary which details the creation of the episode's score. All music was composed by Bear McCreary:

Track listing
No.	Title	Length
1.	"True Wealth of the Mountain"	6:04
2.	"Confronting the Dark Wizard"	3:34
3.	"The White Flame"	6:11
4.	"Sauron and Celebrimbor"	2:30
5.	"No Passage for Low Men"	5:16
6.	"Wounds That Have Endured"	4:18
7.	"The Fall of Galadriel"	12:06
8.	"Shadow and Flame" (featuring Rory Kinnear and Daniel Weyman)	16:01
Total length:		56:00

== Release ==
"Shadow and Flame" premiered on the streaming service Amazon Prime Video on October 3, 2024. It was released at the same time around the world, in more than 240 countries and territories. Ahead of the third season's release in November 2026, a home media release for the first two seasons was announced. Each release features the eight episodes of the respective season along with behind-the-scenes content. They were released on 4K Ultra HD, Blu-ray, and DVD on November 3, and in limited edition 4K UHD SteelBook—with Amazon exclusive collectable art cards—on December 1.

== Reception ==
=== Viewership ===
Luminate, which gathers viewership data from smart TVs, said the series was watched for 358.5 million minutes in the week ending October 3, which included several days of viewership for the seventh episode in addition to the eighth episode's debut. This placed it sixth on the company's chart. Whip Media, which tracks viewership data for the 25 million worldwide users of its TV Time app, again listed the series third—behind Hulu's Only Murders in the Building and Disney+'s Agatha All Along—on its US streaming chart for the week ending October 6. Nielsen Media Research, which records streaming viewership on US television screens, estimated that The Rings of Power had 729 million minutes viewed in the week ending October 6. This made it the fourth biggest original streaming series of the week behind Netflix's Monsters: The Lyle and Erik Menendez Story, Nobody Wants This, and Love Is Blind. Samba TV, which also gathers viewership data from smart TVs, listed the series sixth on its chart of top streaming programs for the week ending October 6.

=== Critical response ===
On review aggregator Rotten Tomatoes, 86% of 14 critics gave the episode a positive review and the average of rated reviews was 7.5 out of 10.

Reviewing the episode for Collider, Arezou Amin gave it 9 out of 10 and praised the confrontation between Galadriel and Sauron. She felt the conclusions of each storyline in the season were satisfying and praised the season for "sustain[ing] narrative tension even though we already know how the story ends". Samantha Nelson at IGN gave the episode 8 out of 10, calling it an "overall great finale" with specific praise for the opening scene between Durin III and the Balrog, Edwards's final scene as Celebrimbor, Galadriel's scenes with Adar and Sauron, and the final scene of the episode. However, Nelson felt the episode showed problems that had been seen throughout the season in the storylines that were less relevant to the major plotlines. Writing for Vulture, Keith Phipps gave the episode three stars out of five and said it was the end of a "pretty good season", with praise for the visuals and production design. He said the episode left its characters in compelling places, though he agreed with Nelson that some of the season's storylines worked better than others. He highlighted the death of Adar, who he said was one of the series' most complicated characters. Matt Schimkowitz of The A.V. Club graded the episode a "B" and said the series' strength was in its characters and performances, particularly highlighting Vickers, Edwards, Walker, Owen, and Mullan. He praised the visual effects of the Balrog sequence but wished more of it had been shown, and was critical of the pacing of the season as a whole with some plotlines being rushed and shortcuts taken.

James Whitbrook at Gizmodo said the episode was a messy ending to the season with some strong scenes—particularly the Balrog scene—that did not work well together. He criticized the endings for most of the characters and storylines, such as the series killing Adar and then moving on from its sympathetic Orc storyline or having Celebrimbor's last line be calling Sauron "the Lord of the Rings". Whitbrook felt the series had crossed over into relying more on references to the familiar Third Age stories by Tolkien and Jackson than its own unique take on the Second Age, and said the series would need to prove moving forward that it could put more focus on emotion and characters. Leon Miller of Polygon had similar thoughts to Whitbrook, finding the episode to be underwhelming and saying the negatives outweighed the positives. He praised the production values and the work of Brändström and Disenhof, as well as the performances—particularly those of Vickers and Edwards—but criticized the need to focus on so many storylines, especially the season's less interesting ones, and felt some had been rushed while the reveal of the Stranger being Gandalf had taken too long across the series. Whitbrook and Miller both criticized the similarities between the scene where Elendil is given Narsil and the scene in Jackson's The Lord of the Rings: The Return of the King (2003) where Elendil's descendant Aragorn is given the same sword, reforged and renamed Andúril. Both critics felt the series' version was hollow in comparison to the film's.

Amin was not surprised by the Stranger being Gandalf but said "it's nice to have the suspicions confirmed all the same". Others were less positive, criticizing the series for taking so long to confirm what had been "clear since season one". Nelson said the Stoors' "Grand Elf" label was "far too cutesy and meta", while Phipps said it might be as silly as the origin of Han Solo's name in the film Solo: A Star Wars Story (2018).

=== Accolades ===
Accolades received by the The Lord of the Rings: The Rings of Power episode "Shadow and Flame"
Award	Date of ceremony	Category	Recipient(s)	Result	Ref.
Art Directors Guild Awards	February 15, 2025	Excellence in Production Design for a One-Hour Fantasy Single-Camera Series	Kristian Milsted	Nominated	
Visual Effects Society Awards	February 11, 2025	Outstanding Effects Simulations in an Episode, Commercial, or Real-Time Project	Koenraad Hofmeester, Miguel Perez Senent, Miguel Santana Da Silva, and Billy Copley (for Balrog Fire and Collapsing Cliff)	Nominated	

== Companion media ==
An episode of the aftershow Inside The Rings of Power for "Shadow and Flame" was released on October 4, 2024. It features actress Felicia Day, the host of The Official The Lord of the Rings: The Rings of Power Podcast, interviewing the showrunners and cast members Vickers and Edwards about the making of the episode, with some behind-the-scenes footage.
