= Doomed to Die =

Doomed to Die may refer to:

- Doomed to Die (film), a 1940 mystery film
- "Doomed to Die" (The Lord of the Rings: The Rings of Power), a 2024 television episode
