= Doomed to Die (The Lord of the Rings: The Rings of Power) =

- The Lord of the Rings: The Rings of Power episode
- Cover art for the episode's soundtrack album
- Episode no.: Season 2 Episode 7
- Directed by: Charlotte Brändström
- Written by: J. D. Payne; Patrick McKay; Justin Doble
- Cinematography by: Alex Disenhof
- Editing by: Joel Skinner
- Original release date: September 26, 2024
- Running time: 72 minutes

Additional cast
- Amelia Kenworthy as Mirdania; Kevin Eldon as Narvi; Sam Hazeldine as Adar; Kai Martin as Zhor; Simon Haines as Malendol; Selina Lo as Rían; Robert Strange as Glûg; Charlie Rix as Vorohil; Jason Smith as the voice of Damrod

Episode chronology
← Previous "Where Is He?"	Next → "Shadow and Flame"
- The Lord of the Rings: The Rings of Power season 2

"Doomed to Die" is the seventh episode of the second season of the American fantasy television series The Lord of the Rings: The Rings of Power, which is based on J. R. R. Tolkien's history of Middle-earth. It was written by showrunners J. D. Payne and Patrick McKay with Justin Doble, and directed by Charlotte Brändström.

The series is set thousands of years before Tolkien's novel The Lord of the Rings (1954–55), during the Second Age of Middle-earth. This episode is dedicated to the Siege of Eregion. Filming for the second season took place in the United Kingdom and on location in the Canary Islands from October 2022 to June 2023.

"Doomed to Die" premiered on the streaming service Amazon Prime Video on September 26, 2024. It was estimated to have high viewership and received positive reviews, with praise for the character development, narrative focus, and action sequences. Multiple critics called it the best episode of the season and some listed it as one of the best episodes of the year. It was also nominated for several awards. The cast and crew defended a controversial kiss between the characters Elrond and Galadriel.

== Background ==
The Lord of the Rings: The Rings of Power is based on J. R. R. Tolkien's history of Middle-earth. It is set thousands of years before his novels The Hobbit (1937) and The Lord of the Rings (1954–55). While it is contractually not a continuation of Peter Jackson's The Lord of the Rings (2001–2003) and The Hobbit (2012–2014) film trilogies, it is intended to be visually consistent with them. J. D. Payne and Patrick McKay were hired to develop the series and serve as its showrunners. Production moved from New Zealand to the United Kingdom starting with the second season, which was directed by Charlotte Brändström, Sanaa Hamri, and Louise Hooper.

The series covers the major events of Middle-earth's Second Age. Amazon did not acquire the rights to Tolkien's main Second Age writings, so the writers identified references to the period in The Hobbit, The Lord of the Rings, and the latter's appendices, and created a story that bridges those passages. The Second Age begins after the defeat of the "Dark Lord" Morgoth, when his army of Orcs are scattered and his lieutenant Sauron is in hiding. The large cast of characters includes Elves, Dwarves, Men, and Harfoots, the last being precursors to the diminutive Hobbits from The Hobbit and The Lord of the Rings. In the first season, Sauron disguises himself as the human "Halbrand" and deceives the Elves into creating three Rings of Power, while the Orcs use the eruption of Mount Doom to create their own realm, the dark land of Mordor.

== Plot ==
Trapped in an illusion by Sauron—posing as Annatar the "Lord of Gifts"—and unaware that Eregion is under attack from across the river, Elf-smith Celebrimbor works on nine Rings of Power for Men. Orc leader Adar orders his forces to aim their trebuchets at the mountains beyond the city, causing a rockslide that blocks the river upstream and allows the Orcs to assault the city's walls.

The Elf Elrond goes to the nearby Dwarven realm of Khazad-dûm and asks Prince Durin IV to send aid to Eregion. Driven mad by his Ring of Power, King Durin III attacks other Dwarves in an attempt to mine more of the powerful ore mithril. Concerned that his father could awaken an evil that lives beneath the mines, Durin IV prioritizes stopping him over sending their army to Eregion.

Celebrimbor notices signs that he is trapped in an illusion and confronts Annatar, who drops it to reveal the battle. Celebrimbor sees that he has been making the nine rings using black blood instead of mithril, and realizes that Annatar is Sauron. He tries to warn the Elven soldiers, but Sauron has convinced them that Celebrimbor is unwell and makes it look like Celebrimbor pushes the Elf-smith Mirdania from the city walls to her death.

Elrond, High King Gil-galad, and the Elven forces of Lindon arrive at Eregion to find the Orcs holding Galadriel hostage. Elrond attempts to negotiate her release, but refuses to hand over her ring, Nenya, to Adar. Elrond kisses Galadriel as cover to give her a pin that she can use to escape her shackles. That night, Galadriel escapes while Adar is mourning his dead, and is saved from some Orcs by the Elf Arondir.

Celebrimbor is imprisoned in his forge, where Sauron promises to spare the city if the nine rings are completed. He finishes the rings and attempts to escape with them, but is caught by his soldiers. Galadriel stops them and Celebrimbor gives her the nine rings. Adar sends Damrod, a Hill-troll, to attack the walls despite knowing he will kill Orcs as well as Elves, angering his follower Glûg. Elrond, Arondir, and Gil-galad kill Damrod. As the sun rises, a small number of Elves are faced with a new wave of Orcs. Elrond holds out hope for the Dwarves' arrival, but they do not come. Adar bests Arondir and takes Nenya from Elrond.

== Production ==
=== Writing ===
"Doomed to Die" was written by Payne, McKay, and Justin Doble. The title references a line from Tolkien's Ring Verse poem: "Nine [Rings] for mortal Men doomed to die".

Elrond star Robert Aramayo said he was initially against the kiss between his character and Morfydd Clark's Galadriel, but came around to the idea after discussing the scene with Clark. He explained that it is not romantic and is primarily a strategic move to give her the pin so she can escape, but that it is also an emotional goodbye. Clark suggested that kissing would not mean the same thing for Elves as it does for humans. McKay reiterated these thoughts, saying they thought the kiss was "a delightful way to show that [Elrond] was sorry that he mistrusted [Galadriel] for so long, and he loved her, and he was going to have to leave her to her own fate. He needed to distract the room so that he could slip her a hope that maybe she could get out of there. A kiss means a different thing between Elves. Thousands of years of friendship mean a different thing to Elves."

=== Casting ===
The season's cast includes Robert Aramayo as Elrond, Owain Arthur as Durin IV, Morfydd Clark as Galadriel, Ismael Cruz Córdova as Arondir, Charles Edwards as Celebrimbor, Peter Mullan as Durin III, Sophia Nomvete as Disa, Charlie Vickers as Sauron, and Benjamin Walker as Gil-galad. Also starring in the episode are Amelia Kenworthy as Mirdania, Kevin Eldon as Narvi, Sam Hazeldine as Adar, Kai Martin as Zhor, Simon Haines as Malendol, Selina Lo as Rían, Robert Strange as Glûg, Charlie Rix as Vorohil, and Jason Smith as the voice of Damrod. Mark Archer, Bridie Sisson, and Stephen Shanly play unnamed Orcs in the episode.

=== Filming ===
Filming for the season began on October 3, 2022, under the working title LBP. Episodes were shot simultaneously based on the availability of locations and sets. Brändström directed "Doomed to Die". Alex Disenhof was the cinematographer for her episodes, returning from the first season. Vic Armstrong was the stunt coordinator and second unit director for the season. The production wrapped in early June 2023.

=== Visual effects ===
Visual effects for the episode were created by DNEG, Outpost VFX, The Yard VFX, Midas VFX, Monsters Aliens Robots Zombies, Untold Studios, Atomic Arts, and Cantina Creative. The different vendors were overseen by visual effects supervisor Jason Smith.

=== Music ===
The Lord of the Rings: The Rings of Power (Season Two, Episode Seven: Doomed to Die – Amazon Original Series Soundtrack)

Film score by Bear McCreary
- Released: September 26, 2024
- Genres: Orchestra; choir; world
- Length: 45:07
- Languages: English; Constructed languages
- Labels: Amazon; Mutant

Bear McCreary chronology
Where Is He? (2024)	Doomed to Die (2024)	Shadow and Flame (2024)

A soundtrack album featuring composer Bear McCreary's score for the episode was released digitally on the streaming service Amazon Music on September 26, 2024. McCreary said the series' episodic albums contained "virtually every second of score" from their respective episodes. It was added to other music streaming services after the full second season was released. A CD featuring the episode's music is included in a limited edition box set collection for the season from Mutant and McCreary's label Sparks & Shadows. The box set was announced in October 2025, and includes a journal written by McCreary which details the creation of the episode's score. All music was composed by Bear McCreary:

Track listing
No.	Title	Length
1.	"Nine for Mortal Men"	6:00
2.	"Shattered Illusion"	2:39
3.	"The Battle for Eregion Begins"	7:22
4.	"Dwarven Loyalty"	5:19
5.	"The Orc Camp"	5:07
6.	"The Light of Celebrimbor"	5:26
7.	"War at the Wall"	3:57
8.	"Damrod" (featuring Jens Kidman)	3:46
9.	"Never Make War in Anger"	5:31
Total length:		45:07

== Release ==
"Doomed to Die" premiered on the streaming service Amazon Prime Video on September 26, 2024. It was released at the same time around the world, in more than 240 countries and territories. Ahead of the third season's release in November 2026, a home media release for the first two seasons was announced. Each release features the eight episodes of the respective season along with behind-the-scenes content. They were released on 4K Ultra HD, Blu-ray, and DVD on November 3, and in limited edition 4K UHD SteelBook—with Amazon exclusive collectable art cards—on December 1.

== Reception ==
=== Viewership ===
Luminate, which gathers viewership data from smart TVs, said the series was watched for 398.3 million minutes in the week ending September 26, which included several days of viewership for the sixth episode in addition to the seventh episode's debut. It tied for fourth place with Netflix's Emily in Paris. Whip Media, which tracks viewership data for the 25 million worldwide users of its TV Time app, again listed the series third—behind Hulu's Only Murders in the Building and Disney+'s Agatha All Along—on its US streaming chart for the week ending September 29. Nielsen Media Research, which records streaming viewership on US television screens, estimated that The Rings of Power had 733 million minutes viewed in the week ending September 29. This made it the fourth biggest original streaming series of the week behind Netflix's Monsters: The Lyle and Erik Menendez Story, Nobody Wants This, and Mr. McMahon. Samba TV, which also gathers viewership data from smart TVs, listed the series ninth on its chart of top streaming programs for the week ending September 29.

=== Critical response ===
On review aggregator Rotten Tomatoes, 100% of 12 critics gave the episode a positive review and the average of rated reviews was 8.4 out of 10.

Matt Schimkowitz of The A.V. Club graded the episode an "A-" and said it "raises the show to exhilarating new heights". He specifically praised Brändström's direction, the use of the series' large budget to realize the battle sequences, and Edwards's performance as Celebrimbor. Reviewing the episode for Polygon, Leon Miller praised it as the best of the season and possibly the series, specifically for its thematic clarity and character development which he felt was allowed by the focus on just the Siege of Eregion and related scenes in Khazad-dûm. Miller lamented that the rest of the season could not be so focused due to the number of different storylines. He also praised the work done by Armstrong and the writers in designing unique action moments that allowed the episode to stand out from previous The Lord of the Rings battle sequences. Samantha Nelson at IGN gave the episode 8 out of 10 and called it the best of the season, though she did not think it bested the "dramatic twists of fortune" in the first season's "Udûn". Similar to Miller, Nelson attributed the episode's success to its focus on Eregion and expressed concern that the season finale would not be able to match this with the number of storylines needed to be resolved by the end of the season. She praised the episode's action and character moments.

Vulture's Keith Phipps gave the episode four stars out of five and agreed that it was the best of the season, praising the pacing and saying "every piece here fits together" unlike some episodes of the series. He felt the Siege of Eregion did not reach the heights of the Battle of Helm's Deep depicted in Jackson's The Lord of the Rings: The Two Towers (2002) but said it was "an impressive piece of work in its own right, establishing a clear sense of space and then letting all hell break loose within it". James Whitbrook at Gizmodo was positive about the action sequences, calling them "the most sumptuous and grandly scaled fight material" of the series so far, but was even more positive about the character moments. He highlighted the agency that is given to Celebrimbor after he learns about Sauron's deception, saying it brought "Lord of the Rings-ian sincerity and hope" along with dramatic weight. He also praised the scenes in Khazad-dûm, the fight with Damrod, and the cliffhanger ending. Writing for Collider, Arezou Amin gave the episode 7 out of 10. She praised the revelation of Sauron's deception to Celebrimbor and the reunion between Elrond and Durin, but felt the scene between Galadriel and Celebrimbor highlighted the lack of development for Galadriel's relationship with Sauron in the season.

=== Audience response ===
The kiss between Elrond and Galadriel was controversial among viewers and commentators, particularly because Elrond goes on to marry Galadriel's daughter Celebrían in Tolkien's history. In his review, Whitbrook criticized the scene as poorly timed during the battle and said the kiss was "an odd twist" to the characters' relationship despite the justification that it is done as a distraction. The showrunners were surprised by these responses and said they had not added the kiss to be controversial, "stir up the fan base", or as "shipping bait", though Payne acknowledged that it was "slightly eyebrow-raising". McKay compared the kiss to those shared by Luke Skywalker and Leia Organa in the Star Wars films before those two characters are revealed to be siblings, saying it "came out of [Elrond and Galadriel's] friendship, and it came out of the needs of that moment".

=== Accolades ===
Charles Edwards was named an honorable mention for TVLine's "Performer of the Week" for the week of September 23, 2024, for his performance in this episode. The site said Edwards had been "sublime" throughout the season and highlighted the scenes where Celebrimbor learns the truth about Sauron in "Doomed to Die", saying: "Even as he fell apart, Celebrimbor retained the pride and pompousness that facilitated all of this... [and Edwards] kept his performance anchored in this truth." "Doomed to Die" was listed as one of the best episodes of 2024 by Total Film (1st), Mashable (20th), IndieWire (27th), and Entertainment Weekly (unranked).

Accolades received by The Lord of the Rings: The Rings of Power episode "Doomed to Die"
Award	Date of ceremony	Category	Recipient(s)	Result	Ref.
Costume Designers Guild Awards	February 6, 2025	Excellence in Sci-Fi/Fantasy Television	Luca Mosca, Katherine Burchill, and Libby Dempster	Nominated	
Golden Reel Awards	February 23, 2025	Outstanding Achievement in Sound Editing – Broadcast Long Form Effects / Foley	Ben Barker, Glenn Freemantle, Emilie O'Connor, Paolo Pavesi, Zoe Freed, and Rebecca Heathcote	Nominated	
Golden Reel Awards	February 23, 2025	Outstanding Achievement in Music Editing – Broadcast Long Form	Jason Smith	Nominated	
Visual Effects Society Awards	February 11, 2025	Outstanding Environment in an Episode, Commercial, or Real-Time Project	Yordan Petrov, Bertrand Cabrol, Lea Desrozier, and Karan Dhandha (for Eregion)	Nominated	

== Companion media ==
An episode of the aftershow Inside The Rings of Power for "Doomed to Die" was released on September 26, 2024. It features actress Felicia Day, the host of The Official The Lord of the Rings: The Rings of Power Podcast, interviewing the showrunners, crew members Brändström, Armstrong, and Smith, and cast members Clark, Aramayo, and Hazeldine about the making of the episode, with some behind-the-scenes footage.
