= The Lord of the Rings: The Rings of Power season 2 =

2024 television season

The Lord of the Rings: The Rings of Power
- Season 2
- Home media cover art
- Showrunners: J. D. Payne; Patrick McKay
- No. of episodes: 8

Release
- Original network: Amazon Prime Video
- Original release: August 29 – October 3, 2024

Season chronology
- ← Previous; Season 1 Next → Season 3

The second season of the American fantasy television series The Lord of the Rings: The Rings of Power is based on J. R. R. Tolkien's history of Middle-earth, primarily material from the appendices of the novel The Lord of the Rings (1954–55). Set thousands of years before the novel in Middle-earth's Second Age, the season depicts the rise of the Dark Lord Sauron and his plan to deceive the Elves into creating more Rings of Power that he can use to dominate the free peoples of Middle-earth. The story builds up to the climactic Siege of Eregion. The season was produced by Amazon MGM Studios in association with New Line Cinema and with J. D. Payne and Patrick McKay as showrunners.

Amazon acquired the television rights to The Lord of the Rings in November 2017 and made a multi-season commitment for a new series. A second season was ordered in November 2019, and writing began during an extended first-season production break that started due to the COVID-19 pandemic. Amazon announced in August 2021 that filming for the series would move from New Zealand to the United Kingdom starting with the second season. Filming began in October 2022, with Charlotte Brändström, Sanaa Hamri, and Louise Hooper directing. Much of the series' large international cast returned from the first season, as did composer Bear McCreary who started work when production began. Location filming took place around Surrey and Berkshire as well as in the Canary Islands, and filming was completed in early June 2023 amid the 2023 Writers Guild of America strike.

The season premiered on the streaming service Amazon Prime Video on August 29, 2024, with its first three episodes. The other five episodes were released weekly until October 3. Third-party analytics companies estimated viewership to be high, despite a significant drop from the first season, and Amazon said it was the most-watched returning season on Prime Video. Reviews were generally positive, with praise for the visuals and McCreary's score but mixed thoughts on whether the writing and pacing had improved. Audience responses were deemed to be more positive than for the first season. The second season received various accolades including a Primetime Creative Arts Emmy Award nomination.

== Episodes ==
| No. overall | No. in season | Title | Directed by | Written by | Original release date |
|---|---|---|---|---|---|
| 9 | 1 | "Elven Kings Under the Sky" | Charlotte Brändström | Gennifer Hutchison | August 29, 2024 |
At the dawn of the Second Age, the Dark Lord Sauron is seemingly killed by an army of Orcs and their leader, Adar, but his spirit endures and forms a new body over thousands of years. Taking the name "Halbrand", he helps the Elves forge three Rings of Power before his identity is revealed. High King Gil-galad believes they have no choice but to use the rings against Sauron while his herald, Elrond, objects. Elrond escapes with the rings and takes them to Círdan, the oldest and wisest Elf in Middle-earth, who agrees to help until he sees the rings and believes them to be true perfection. Círdan, Galadriel, and Gil-galad put them on and the power of the Elves is restored. The Stranger—a Wizard who is regaining his memories—and the Harfoot Nori Brandyfoot get lost on their way to the land of Rhûn. They are followed by Nori's friend Poppy Proudfellow, who brings Harfoot maps to help them find their way. In Mordor, Halbrand is brought to Adar and reveals that Sauron has returned. He offers to go to Eregion—the Elven realm where the rings were forged—while Adar raises his army to attack Sauron.
| 10 | 2 | "Where the Stars are Strange" | Charlotte Brändström; Louise Hooper | Jason Cahill | August 29, 2024 |
The ongoing eruption of Mount Doom causes an earthquake in the Dwarven realm of Khazad-dûm that destroys their infrastructure and leads to the withering of their crops. King Durin III and his son, Prince Durin IV, refuse to reconcile despite the crisis. Galadriel has a vision of Celebrimbor's death and asks to go to Eregion. Gil-galad agrees if Elrond leads her company, and Círdan convinces the reluctant Elrond that it would be better for him to guide his friends rather than abandon them. In Rhûn, a Dark Wizard sends a group of riders to capture the Stranger. Using a staff that he finds, the Stranger summons a sandstorm which drives the riders off. He loses control, the staff disintegrates, and the storm sweeps Nori and Poppy away. Sauron poses as Halbrand at the gates of Eregion and refuses to leave. Though he promised Galadriel he would never talk to Halbrand again, Celebrimbor does not know he is Sauron and eventually approaches him. Halbrand convinces Celebrimbor that he is Annatar, the "Lord of Gifts", an emissary from the Valar who has come to help make Rings of Power for Dwarves and Men.
| 11 | 3 | "The Eagle and the Sceptre" | Louise Hooper; Charlotte Brändström | Helen Shang | August 29, 2024 |
Though Isildur is presumed dead in the eruption of Mount Doom, his horse Berek finds him alive in a nest of giant spiders and helps him escape. On his way to Pelargir, an old Númenórean colony, Isildur comes across a young woman named Estrid who secretly bears Adar's brand. They are attacked by Wild Men who steal Berek, and are saved by the Elf Arondir who is grieving the loss of Bronwyn, the woman he loved. Bronwyn's son, Theo, dismisses Arondir's attempts to comfort him and offers to help Isildur steal Berek back. As they are doing this, Theo and the Wild Men are captured by something unknown. In Númenor, Isildur's sister Eärien causes outrage when she reveals that Queen Regent Míriel has been using an Elvish palantír seeing stone. A Great Eagle arrives at Míriel's coronation—following the death of her father, King Tar-Palantir—and Lord Belzagar, a supporter of Míriel's cousin Pharazôn, claims that this is a sign of support for Pharazôn. Celebrimbor and Annatar ask the Dwarves for mithril so they can make more Rings of Power. Durin III provides it, despite Durin IV's distrust of Annatar.
| 12 | 4 | "Eldest" | Louise Hooper; Sanaa Hamri | Glenise Mullins | September 5, 2024 |
Elrond and Galadriel set out for Eregion. They come to a bridge that has been destroyed by lightning and are forced to take a more dangerous path. The Stranger meets a mysterious man named Tom Bombadil while Nori and Poppy find a community of halflings called Stoors living in a desert canyon. The Harfoots are descended from a Stoor who left Rhûn in search of the Sûzat, a place of green hills that he dreamed could be the home of halflings. Arondir deduces that Estrid is one of the Wild Men. She earns back Isildur's trust when he and Arondir are sucked into a mud pit inhabited by a nameless creature and she helps free them. They are confronted by two Ents who captured Theo and the Wild Men in retribution for the felling of trees by Wild Men and by Adar's army. Arondir promises to protect the forest and the Ents free their prisoners; one of the Wild Men is Hagen, Estrid's betrothed. After fighting off Barrow-wights, Elrond and Galadriel find Adar's army. Galadriel gives her ring, Nenya, to Elrond and tells him to warn Gil-galad. Galadriel stays to hold off the Orcs and is captured by Adar.
| 13 | 5 | "Halls of Stone" | Louise Hooper; Sanaa Hamri | Nicholas Adams | September 12, 2024 |
Durin III uses one of the new Rings of Power to help rebuild the Dwarves' infrastructure and bring sunlight back to Khazad-dûm. The ring also makes the king greedy, and he dismisses a warning from Disa that they could be awakening something evil that lives beneath the mines. In Eregion, Annatar insists that they start work on Rings of Power for Men but Celebrimbor refuses to be involved. When Durin IV expresses his concerns about the Dwarven rings to Celebrimbor, Annatar suggests that the negative impacts are being caused by Celebrimbor lying to Gil-galad about making more rings. Celebrimbor agrees to help make rings for Men in an attempt to redeem his work on the Dwarven rings. The new king of Númenor, Ar-Pharazôn, tasks his son Kemen with cracking down on members of the Faithful who remain loyal to Míriel. Kemen interrupts a memorial service that members of the Faithful are holding, leading to a fight with Isildur's friend Valandil that ends with Kemen killing Valandil. Isildur's father Elendil is blamed for starting a riot and arrested. Elrond arrives in Lindon and warns Gil-galad.
| 14 | 6 | "Where Is He?" | Sanaa Hamri | Justin Doble | September 19, 2024 |
Celebrimbor focuses on making rings for Men. Annatar offers to take care of Eregion's administration and gives him a container which he claims to hold mithril. Outside the city, Adar tells Galadriel that the crown of Sauron's master, Morgoth, was able to destroy Sauron's previous physical form. He believes that together, the crown and the Elven Rings of Power could destroy Sauron for good. Elendil refuses to pledge his loyalty to Ar-Pharazôn and is sentenced to trial by abyss, in which he would be thrown into the sea to face a sea monster called the Sea Worm. Míriel claims the right to be tried in Elendil's stead; the Sea Worm spares her life and the Faithful hail her as the "Queen of the Sea". Tom takes the Stranger to a forest of dead trees where he is meant to find a magic staff. The Stranger has a vision of Nori and Poppy being threatened by the Dark Wizard and must decide between helping his friends and fulfilling his destiny. Galadriel realizes that Sauron has lured Adar's army to Eregion because he does not have one of his own. Adar ignores her concerns and begins besieging Eregion.
| 15 | 7 | "Doomed to Die" | Charlotte Brändström | J. D. Payne & Patrick McKay and Justin Doble | September 26, 2024 |
The Orcs aim their trebuchets at the mountains beyond the city, causing a rockslide that blocks the river upstream and allows them to assault the city's walls on foot. Elrond comes to Khazad-dûm and asks Durin IV to send aid to Eregion. Durin IV decides not to when Durin III attempts to mine more mithril, which could awaken the evil that lives beneath the mine. As Celebrimbor creates nine Rings of Power for Men, he notices signs that he is trapped in an illusion. He confronts Annatar, who ends the illusion and reveals that Celebrimbor has made the nine rings using Sauron's blood rather than mithril. Elrond, Gil-galad, and the forces of Lindon arrive and attack the Orcs. That night, Galadriel escapes with the help of Arondir, who followed the Orcs' trail. The pair sneak into Eregion. Celebrimbor attempts to escape with the nine rings and finds Galadriel, who takes them while Celebrimbor stays to delay Sauron. As the sun rises, a small number of Elves are faced with a new wave of Orcs led by Adar. Elrond is disappointed when Durin IV does not arrive. Adar stabs Arondir and takes Nenya from Elrond.
| 16 | 8 | "Shadow and Flame" | Charlotte Brändström | J. D. Payne & Patrick McKay | October 3, 2024 |
Durin III is attacked by the Balrog that lives below the mithril mine. He names Durin IV king before fighting back as the cavern collapses. The Stranger confronts the Dark Wizard and rejects his offer to supplant Sauron. The Dark Wizard destroys the canyon, forcing the Stoors to migrate; Nori and Poppy join them. The Stranger finds a staff in the canyon and believes he will come to be known as "Gandalf". Ar-Pharazôn learns from the palantír that Halbrand is Sauron and accuses Míriel of aligning herself with him, discrediting the results of her trial. All of the Faithful are arrested except Elendil, who escapes to the island's west with the sword Narsil. Kemen claims Pelargir as a military outpost. Isildur asks Estrid to return to Númenor with him, but Kemen does not allow this and Isildur leaves Estrid with Hagen. In Eregion, Sauron kills Celebrimbor and takes the nine rings from Galadriel while Adar is killed by disillusioned Orcs. Durin IV sends his army to aid the Elves, allowing Gil-galad, Elrond, Arondir, Galadriel, and other survivors to escape to a valley north of the city where they resolve to stand against Sauron.

== Cast and characters ==
=== Starring ===
- Charlie Vickers as Sauron
- Morfydd Clark as Galadriel
- Robert Aramayo as Elrond
- Benjamin Walker as Gil-galad
- Daniel Weyman as the Stranger
- Ciarán Hinds as the Dark Wizard
- Markella Kavenagh as Elanor "Nori" Brandyfoot
- Megan Richards as Poppy Proudfellow
- Charles Edwards as Celebrimbor
- Sophia Nomvete as Disa
- Owain Arthur as Durin IV
- Peter Mullan as Durin III
- Lloyd Owen as Elendil
- Maxim Baldry as Isildur
- Trystan Gravelle as Pharazôn
- Cynthia Addai-Robinson as Míriel
- Ismael Cruz Córdova as Arondir
- Tyroe Muhafidin as Theo

=== Supporting ===
- Jack Lowden as Forodwaith Sauron
- Ben Daniels as Círdan
- Sam Hazeldine as Adar
- Nicholas Woodeson as Diarmid
- Geoff Morrell as Waldreg
- Amelia Kenworthy as Mirdania
- Kevin Eldon as Narvi
- Alex Tarrant as Valandil
- Ema Horvath as Eärien
- Leon Wadham as Kemen
- Will Keen as Belzagar
- Nia Towle as Estrid
- Rory Kinnear as Tom Bombadil
- Jim Broadbent as the voice of Snaggleroot
- Olivia Williams as the voice of Winterbloom
- Calam Lynch as Camnir
- Gavi Singh Chera as Merimac
- Tanya Moodie as Gundabale Earthauler

=== Other ===
- Robert Strange as Glûg
- Zates Atour as Brânk
- Arkie Reece as Kilta
- Bridie Sisson as the Dweller
- Stuart Bowman as Barduk
- William Chubb as the High Priest of Númenor
- Benjamin Walker and Jason Smith as the voice of Damrod
- Gabriel Akuwudike as Hagen
- Charlie Rix as Vorohil
- Selina Lo as Rían
- Oliver Alvin-Wilson as Daemor
- Raya Yarbrough as the voice of Goldberry

== Production ==
=== Development ===
Amazon acquired the television rights for J. R. R. Tolkien's The Lord of the Rings (1954–55) in November 2017. The company's streaming service, Amazon Prime Video, gave a multi-season commitment to a series based on the novel and its appendices that was believed to be for five seasons, to be produced by Amazon MGM Studios in association with New Line Cinema and in consultation with the Tolkien Estate. The budget was expected to be around US$100–150 million per season, and the streaming service had to give a formal greenlight to future seasons before work could begin on them. J. D. Payne and Patrick McKay were hired to develop the series in July 2018, and were named showrunners a year later. Prime Video ordered an eight-episode second season in November 2019, and announced the series' title, The Lord of the Rings: The Rings of Power, in January 2022.

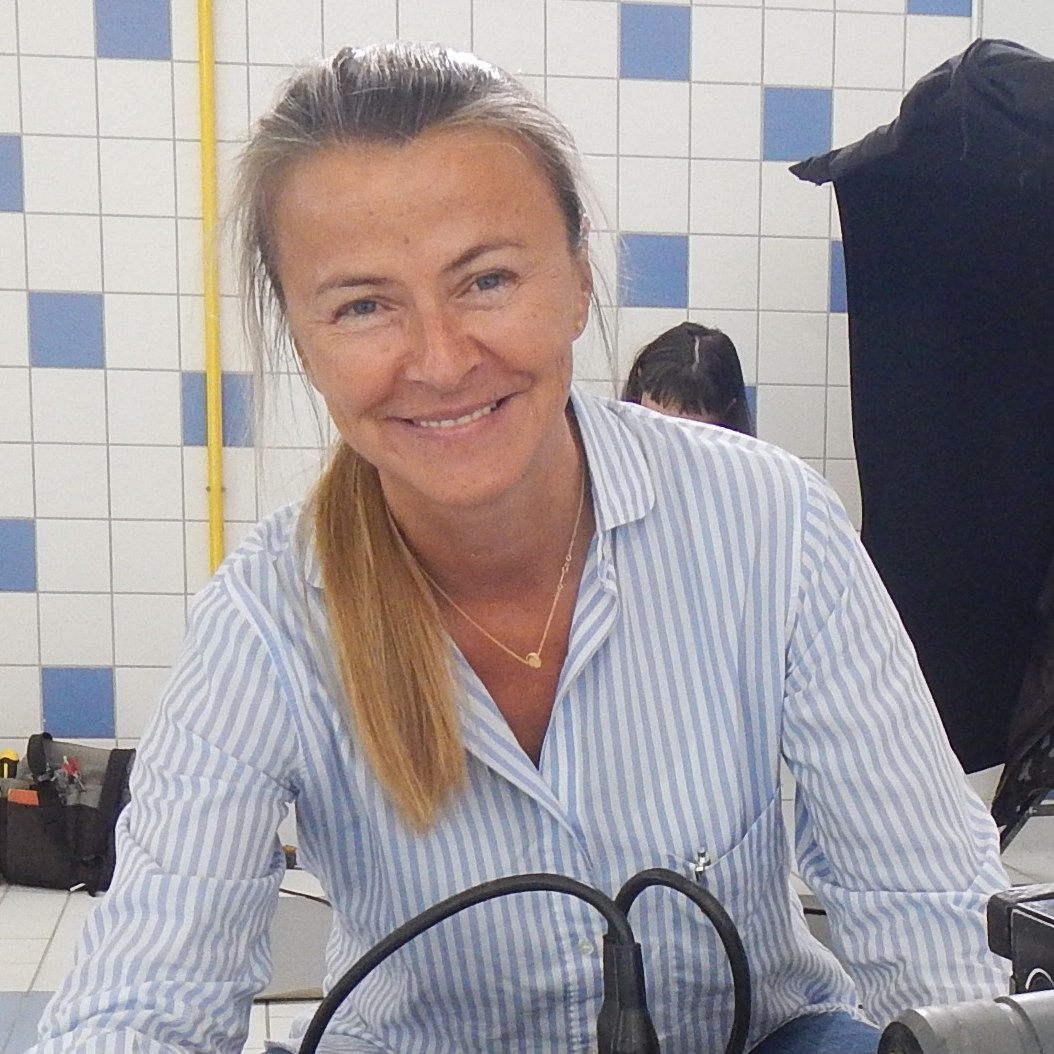
Charlotte Brändström directed four episodes of the season and served as co-executive producer

In August 2022, Amazon explained that the deal with Tolkien's estate required the company to keep the series distinct from Peter Jackson's The Lord of the Rings (2001–2003) and The Hobbit (2012–2014) film adaptations. Despite this, the showrunners intended for it to be visually consistent with the films. In December, the second season's directing team was revealed: Charlotte Brändström returned from the first season to direct four episodes, with Sanaa Hamri and Louise Hooper set to direct two episodes each. Brändström was also made a co-executive producer for the season, which was executive produced by Payne, McKay, Lindsey Weber, Callum Greene, Justin Doble, Jason Cahill, and Gennifer Hutchison. Several key creatives did not return from the first season, including producer Ron Ames, costume designer Kate Hawley, and production designer Ramsey Avery.

=== Writing ===
The series' writers' room was disbanded once production on the first season began in February 2020, but a longer-than-usual four- or five-month production break was planned following the filming of the first two episodes to allow the writers to reconvene, review the early footage, map out the second season, and write the majority of its scripts. This break began earlier than expected due to the COVID-19 pandemic, taking place from mid-March to the end of September. Writing for the second season was expected to be completed concurrently with post-production on the first between August 2021 and June 2022. The showrunners said most of the second season was written before the first was released. The writers' room for the second season included Payne, McKay, Doble, Hutchison, Cahill, Helen Shang, Glenise Mullins, and Nicholas Adams.

After introducing the Second Age of Middle-earth and its heroic characters in the first season, the showrunners said the second season would focus on the villains and go deeper into the "lore and the stories people have been waiting to hear". Following the reveal that the Dark Lord Sauron was posing as the human Halbrand, he disguises himself as an Elf named Annatar in the second season. The story involves him deceiving the people of Middle-earth into creating Rings of Power that he can use to control them, leading to a three-episode battle between the Orcs and the armies of the Elves led by Galadriel, Elrond, and Gil-galad. The showrunners said the Elf-smith Celebrimbor was the "principal protagonist" of the season and his relationship with Sauron is central to its story. McKay felt the season would be more impactful because of the time Sauron spent with other characters posing as Halbrand, compared to if they started the series with Sauron as a prominent antagonist. The showrunners added that Sauron would be exploiting "serious cracks" within the societies that the first season introduced, including the Dwarves. Expanding on Tolkien's explanation that the Rings of Power stoked the Dwarves' greed, they decided to explore King Durin III going mad and becoming a villain after receiving a ring.

The showrunners wanted to explore locations and characters from Tolkien's novels that had not been seen onscreen before, including the eastern land of Rhûn, and the Númenórean colony of Pelargir. The season also features the whimsical character Tom Bombadil and the wraith-like Barrow-wight creatures from The Lord of the Rings. Both were omitted from Jackson's films but were previously adapted in the Soviet television miniseries Khraniteli (1991). Because Tolkien kept Tom's origins and intentions mysterious, the showrunners interpreted his descriptions to create a reason for the character's inclusion. The showrunners saw Tom as a rare light for the season, and felt it was important to embrace the hope and earnestness in Tolkien's works rather than let the season's darker story become nihilistic and cynical. Rhûn is visited by the Stranger and the Harfoots Nori and Poppy, where they encounter a tribe of Harfoot-like Stoors, Tom Bombadil, and a Dark Wizard. The season confirms that the Stranger is the Wizard Gandalf following speculation about his true identity. The showrunners wanted this reveal to be a journey of self-discovery for the character rather than a surprise for the audience, with hints throughout the season allowing most viewers to be "several episodes ahead of him".

=== Location ===
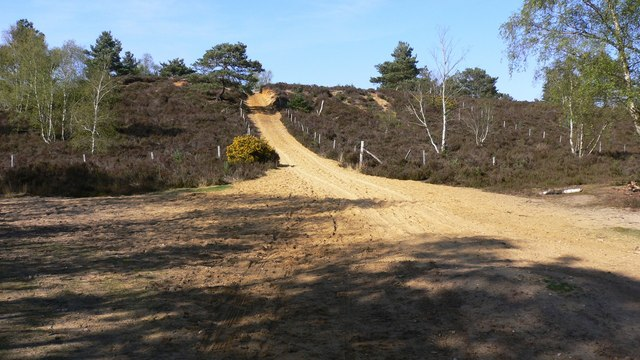
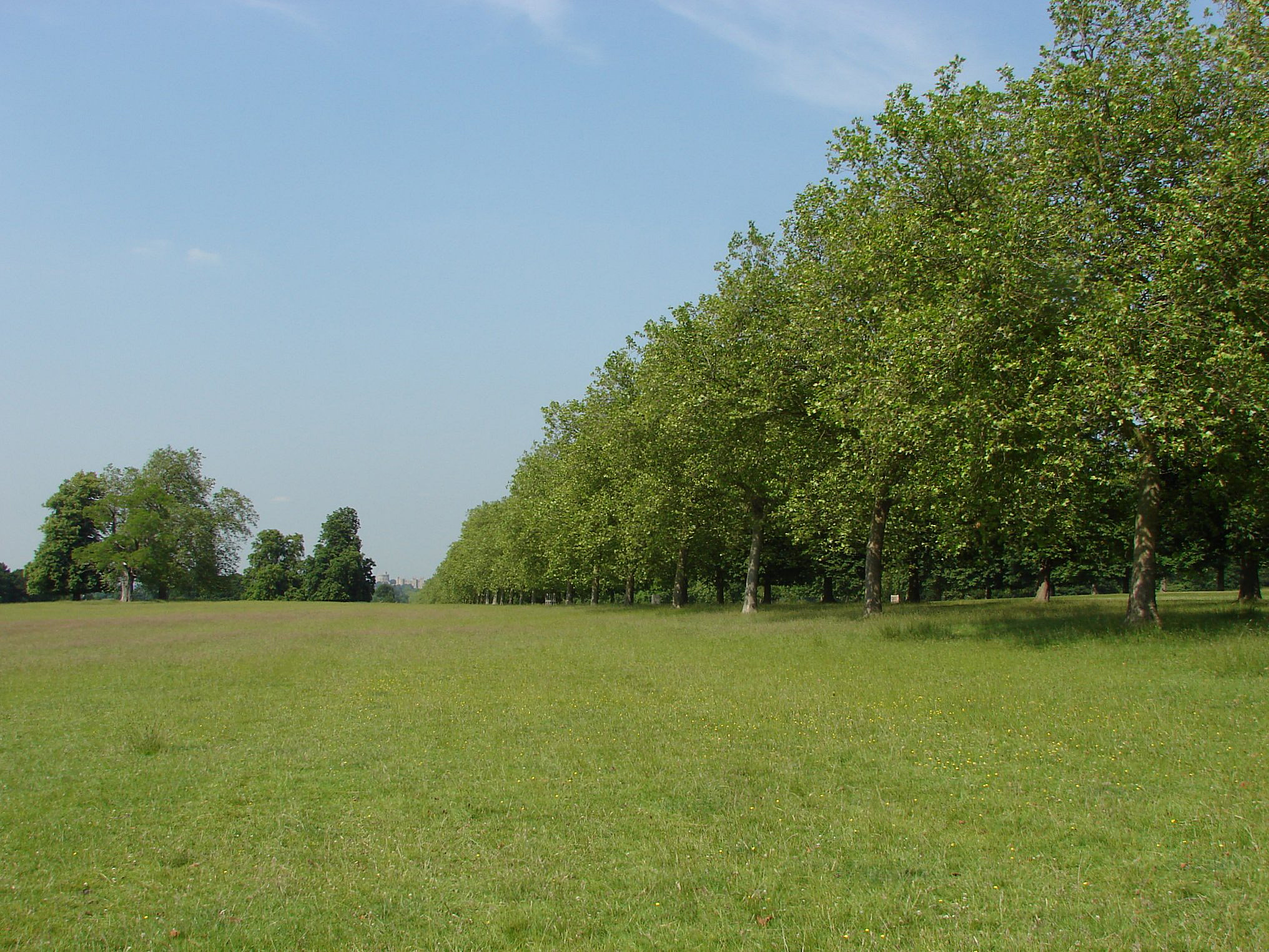
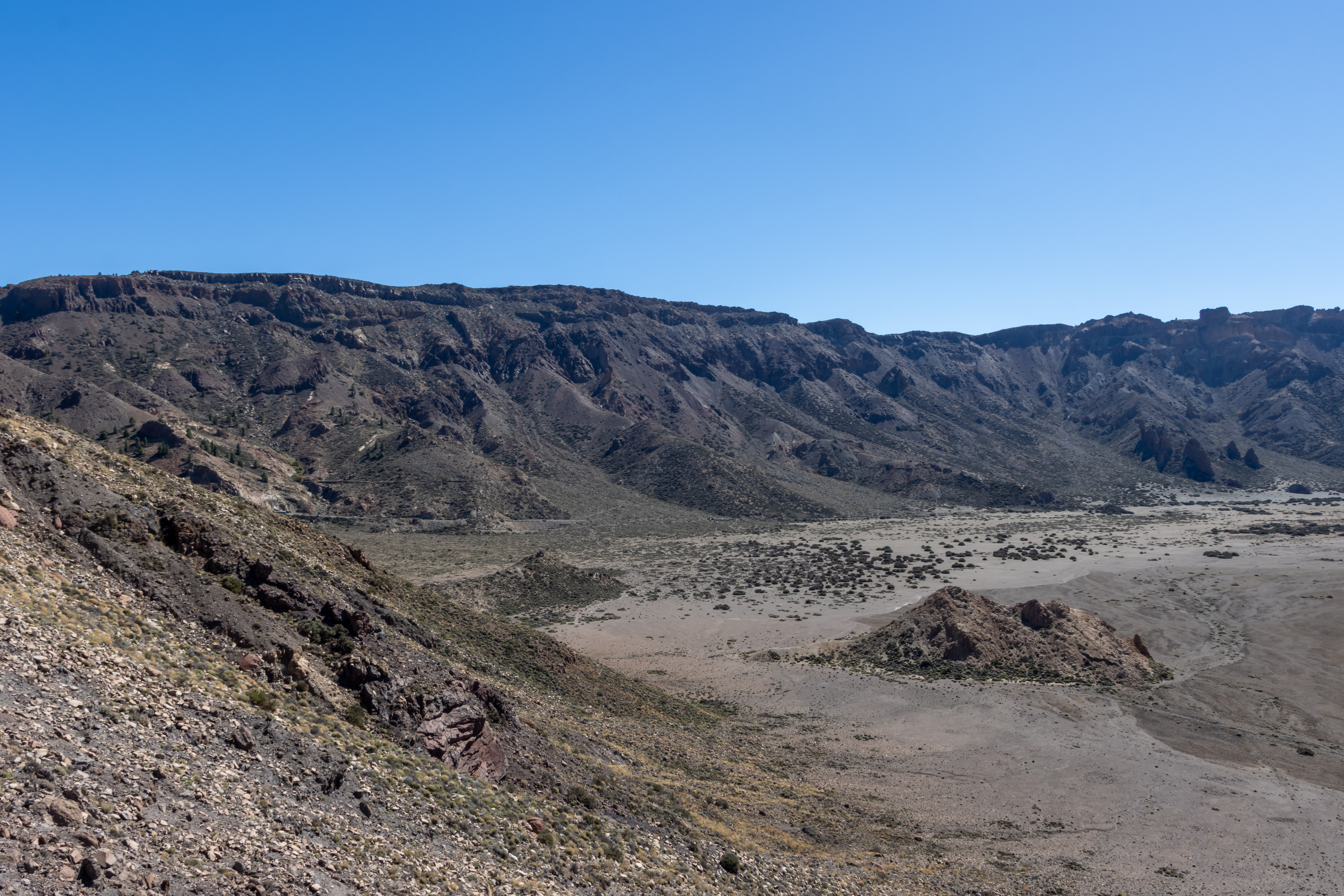
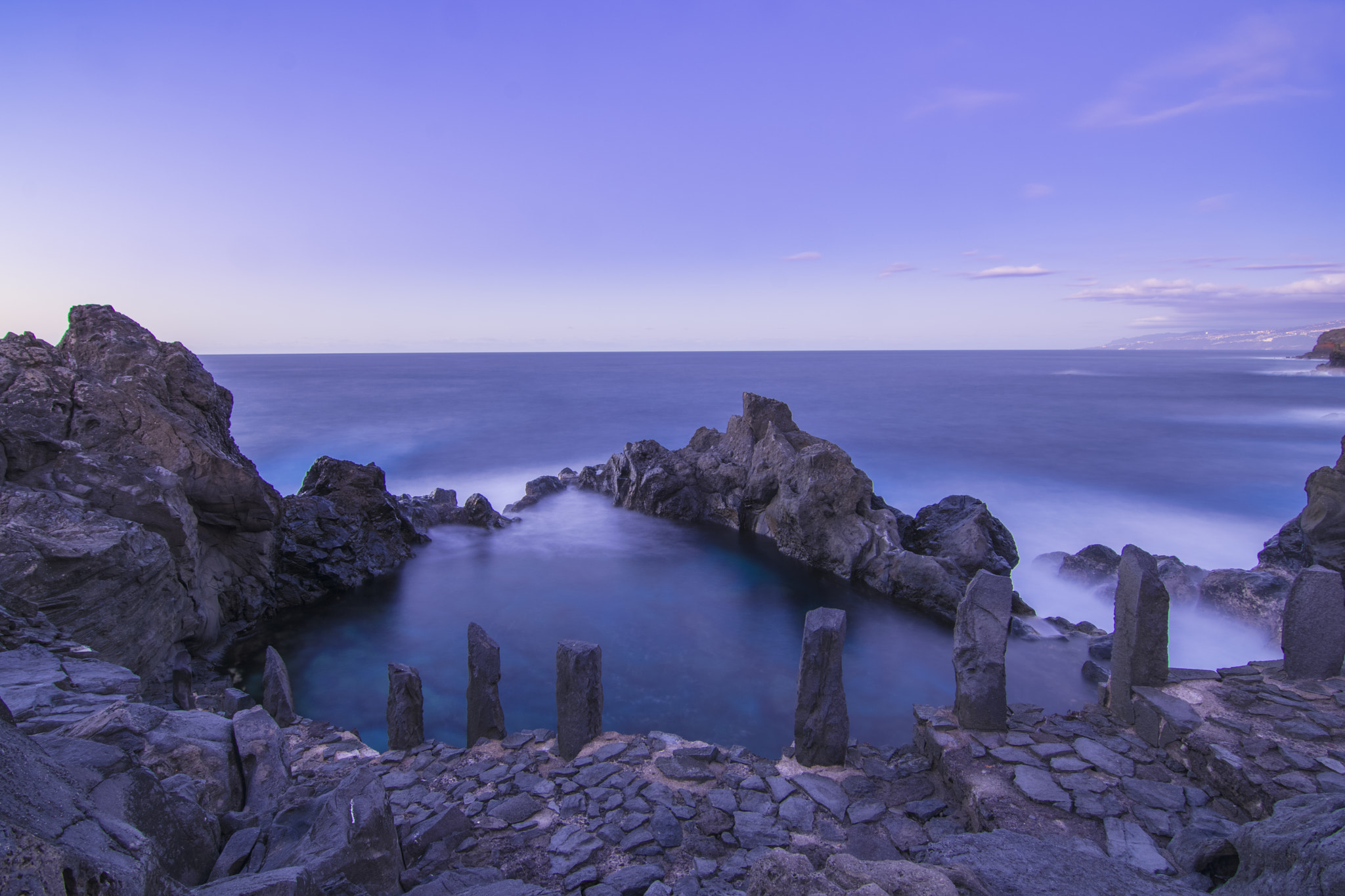
Production was moved from New Zealand to the United Kingdom for the second season, with additional filming in the Canary Islands. Filming locations included (top, left-to-right) Hankley Common and Windsor Great Park in England, and (bottom, left-to-right) the Teide National Park and San Juan de la Rambla in Tenerife.

Amazon Studios head Jennifer Salke said in June 2018 that the series could be produced in New Zealand, where Jackson's films were made, but Amazon was open to shooting in other countries; Scotland was also considered. Amazon confirmed in September 2019 that filming would take place in New Zealand. Production for the first season ended on August 2, 2021, at which point the New Zealand crew were unsure when filming for the second season would begin. Amazon considered filming the two seasons back-to-back, as was done for the films, but there was now expected to be a hiatus of at least a year. This was to allow post-production on the first season and writing for the second to be completed. Amazon retained its lease on the series' Auckland film studios so the sets could remain there for the duration of the hiatus.

The week after filming wrapped for the first season, Amazon announced that it was moving production to the United Kingdom starting with the second. The company was in the process of booking studio space in the UK, and Scotland was reported to be the frontrunner for new shooting locations. Amazon planned to ship the first season's sets from New Zealand to the UK and hire a new UK-based crew since the majority of the first season's crew was New Zealand-based. Factors that played a role in the change included Amazon already heavily investing in UK studio space for other productions; a belief that the UK would be a more economical choice following the high cost of producing the first season in New Zealand; the opportunity to film in European countries near the UK as was done for the series Game of Thrones (2011–2019); Tolkien's estate wanting the series to be filmed in the UK since Tolkien was inspired by locations there; and New Zealand's restrictive pandemic-era border policies which prevented Amazon executives from visiting and monitoring the production and forced many international cast members—more than half of whom are British—to stay in the country for nearly two years during filming for the first season. Amazon had offered in August 2020 to pay for the use of hotels and rental properties as private quarantine facilities to give the production more flexibility with travel, but this idea was rejected by the New Zealand government due to the supposed need for additional services related to quarantining.

The cast and crew expressed regret that they were not returning to New Zealand for the second season. Weber said it was difficult to leave and they would not have been able to make the first season without the New Zealand crew, many of whom previously worked on the films. In contrast, McKay felt they would be "bring[ing] the property home" to the UK. He added that the new lands being visited within Tolkien's world would justify new filming locations, and Amazon's television head Vernon Sanders confirmed that the second season would take advantage of the new locations available in the UK and across Europe. Pre-production was expected to begin in the second quarter of 2022. Production was set to be primarily based at Bray Film Studios and Bovingdon Airfield Studios outside of London, and the showrunners were scouting for additional locations in June 2022.

In September 2024, a retracted social media post from Bovingdon said the season had an estimated cost of £533 million (US$700 million). A year later, production costs for the season were reported to have been "dramatically reduced" from the first season's US$465 million budget due to the UK's tax incentives, which include up to 25.5 percent reimbursed through the high-end television tax relief program. Financial statements through the end of filming in June 2023 revealed a UK spend of £364 million (US$458.2 million) and rebate of £72.8 million (US$91.9 million), giving a net cost of £291.2 million (US$366.3 million) to that point.

=== Casting ===
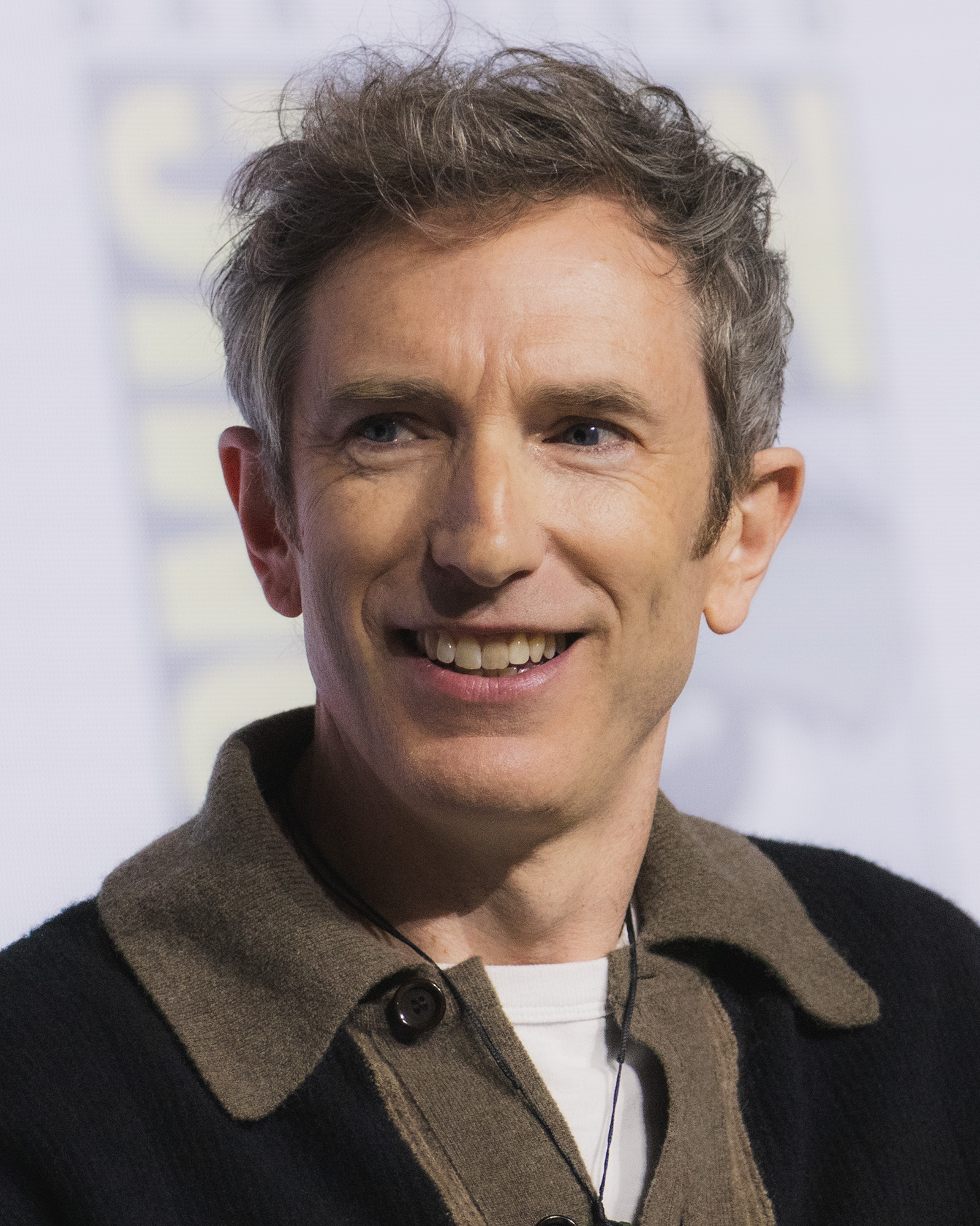
Daniel Weyman portrays the Stranger, who is revealed in the season finale to be the Wizard Gandalf. This came after speculation about the character's true identity since the series began.

Cast members who returned from the first season include Cynthia Addai-Robinson as Míriel, Robert Aramayo as Elrond, Owain Arthur as Durin IV, Maxim Baldry as Isildur, Morfydd Clark as Galadriel, Ismael Cruz Córdova as Arondir, Charles Edwards as Celebrimbor, Trystan Gravelle as Pharazôn, Ema Horvath as Eärien, Markella Kavenagh as Elanor "Nori" Brandyfoot, Geoff Morrell as Waldreg, Tyroe Muhafidin as Theo, Peter Mullan as Durin III, Sophia Nomvete as Disa, Lloyd Owen as Elendil, Megan Richards as Poppy Proudfellow, Alex Tarrant as Valandil, Charlie Vickers as Sauron, Leon Wadham as Kemen, Benjamin Walker as Gil-galad, and Daniel Weyman as the Stranger. Walker also provided the voice for the Hill-troll Damrod, alongside visual effects supervisor Jason Smith. Nazanin Boniadi chose not to return for the season and her character, Bronwyn, is revealed to have died offscreen.

In August 2022, the showrunners said the Tolkien character Círdan would be introduced in the second season. The character briefly appeared in the Lord of the Rings films portrayed by Michael Elsworth. On December 1, Sam Hazeldine was revealed to have replaced Joseph Mawle in the role of Adar for the second season. The decision had been made several months earlier and Mawle did not participate in promotion for the first season. Amazon also announced the casting of Gabriel Akuwudike, Yasen "Zates" Atour, Ben Daniels, newcomer Amelia Kenworthy, Nia Towle, and Nicholas Woodeson in recurring roles. On December 7, Amazon further announced the casting of Oliver Alvin-Wilson, Stuart Bowman, Gavi Singh Chera, William Chubb, Kevin Eldon, Will Keen, Selina Lo, and Calam Lynch in recurring roles. After the diversity of the first season's cast received backlash online, Sanders was asked about the casting approach for the second season and said, "The series continues to be cast from all around the world. We think that represents the show that we created in season one... we are trying to find the best actor for the role."

Amazon announced in March 2023 that Ciarán Hinds, Rory Kinnear, and Tanya Moodie would also have recurring roles in the season. The roles for several new cast members were announced in mid-2024, including Kinnear as Tom Bombadil, Daniels as Círdan, and Jim Broadbent and Olivia Williams as the voices of Ents. The showrunners revealed in July that one of Sauron's forms would be portrayed by an actor other than Vickers; Jack Lowden portrays Sauron's previous form for a flashback in the season premiere. The finale confirms that the Stranger is an earlier version of Gandalf, who was portrayed by Ian McKellen in Jackson's films. Other Tolkien characters that were adapted for the season include the Dwarf Narvi (Eldon), Tom Bombadil's wife Goldberry (voiced by singer Raya Yarbrough, the wife of composer Bear McCreary), and another of Tolkien's Wizards (Hinds) whose identity is not confirmed during the season.

=== Design ===
Kristian Milsted and Luca Mosca took over as production designer and costume designer, respectively, for the second season. Mosca had joined as an additional costume designer late in the first season. 70 shipping containers were used to move physical elements that were built for the first season from New Zealand to the UK. 120 physical sets were used for the second season, with two thirds of those being completely new builds. The other third of sets were re-used from the first season and were updated and expanded by the design team. Barrie and Sarah Gower's BGFX took over as the prosthetics house for the season.

=== Filming ===
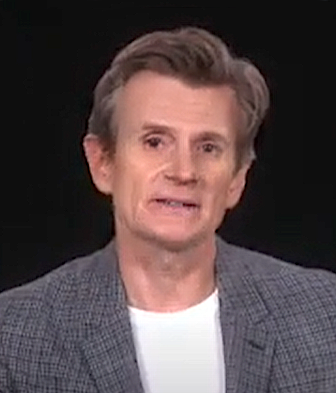
Charles Edwards had a central role in the season as Celebrimbor, and received praise for his performance.

The cast was preparing to travel to the UK in August 2022. Filming began on October 3, under the working title LBP, and was set to continue for around eight months. Brändström, Hamri, and Hooper were directing their episodes simultaneously based on the availability of locations and sets, with three first units filming independently. Alex Disenhof returned from the first season to work with Brändström as cinematographer, with Laurie Rose and Jean-Philippe Gossart as the other cinematographers. Vic Armstrong supervised the series' action sequences and was the lead second unit director, with Ben Cooke as stunt coordinator. Vickers and Edwards filmed their scenes in chronological order, allowing them to build the relationship between Sauron and Celebrimbor throughout the season.

Milsted noted that many productions in the UK film from April to October to avoid poor weather, but he felt the opposite schedule worked well for the season because the "snow and the sleet and the rain and the wind" were appropriate for its darker tone. A key location was Buttersteep Rise in Windsor Great Park, where 12 sets were built including a castle and trebuchets. Buttersteep was chosen for its combination of woods and open fields. By late October, filming was taking place on Hankley Common in Surrey. A set for a ruined village was built on the reserve's "barren black landscape" which resulted from two wildfires earlier in 2022. This led to speculation that the common was being used to portray the dark land Mordor. Location filming in Tenerife, Canary Islands, began in early March, specifically in the Teide National Park. The production used Tenerife to capture the desert landscapes of Rhûn. By March 17, filming was taking place at the Tenerife town of San Juan de la Rambla, including at the Charco de la Laja coastal pool. McKay said the production spent five weeks filming in a "far-flung overseas location".

On March 21, a horse died of cardiac arrest during rehearsals on the season's UK set. It was one of around 30 horses provided for the scene by film industry horse outfitter the Devil's Horsemen. This was the first on-set death in the company's 50-year history, and the horse had been standing among 20 other horses when it died. Animal rights organization PETA called for the production to use visual effects and other techniques rather than risk the lives of real horses. Filming at Bray Studios was interrupted for about an hour on April 3 when a fire broke out in a warehouse. Filming for the season's large battle between Orcs and Elves took place in Windsor Great Park throughout April. Clark said on April 15 that she was in the middle of four weeks of night shoots. The next week, Nicole McBride at Bracknell News reported on the concerns of local residents regarding damage done to the environment by the production. In response, the Crown Estate said they would work with the production to "fully restore the area of woodland... includ[ing] the creation of new habitats". Supervising location manager Finlay Bradbury said Windsor Great Park would be improved once this work was complete, which he said would take a year or two.

After the 2023 Writers Guild of America strike started in May, the showrunners and other writer-producers were no longer able to be on set. The season reportedly had 19 filming days left as of May 4, when the production was revealed to be continuing under the supervision of Brändström and Weber. This approach had been planned ahead of the strike confirmation. The production officially wrapped in early June.

=== Visual effects ===
Studio The Yard VFX worked on the visual effects of the season, along with the show's visual effects supervisor Jason Smith.

=== Music ===
Composer Bear McCreary received scripts for the second season the day after he completed work on the first season's music, in October 2022. He was asked to compose several songs that were needed during filming, and also began planning new themes or leitmotifs to represent the season's new locations and characters, including Rhûn, Eregion, Estrid, Tom Bombadil, Shelob, the Ents, and the Barrow-wights.

McCreary initially expressed hope that he could pace out his work better than he did on the first season, but the writers strike led to a change in schedule, with McCreary needing to compose much of the second season's score before recording and mixing began near the end of post-production. He composed eight hours of music from September 2023 to April 2024, even less time than he had on the first season. Recording began while McCreary was composing the seventh episode, and took two months. Orchestral recording took place at Abbey Road Studios and AIR Studios in London. Several choirs were recorded for the season: the Synchron Stage Choir at Synchron Stage in Vienna; the Trinity Boys Choir at Trinity School in London; the Mystery of the Bulgarian Voices, a Bulgarian women's choir, at Sofia Session Studio in Sofia; and Mieskuoro Huutajat, a screaming men's choir, at Wolfbeat Studios in Kempele, Finland. Soloist singers and performers on various specialty instruments were also recorded around the world.

The Lord of the Rings: The Rings of Power (Season Two: Amazon Original Series Soundtrack)

Film score by Bear McCreary
- Released: August 23, 2024
- Recorded: March – May 2024
- Studios: Abbey Road; AIR; Synchron Stage Vienna; Trinity School; Sofia Session; Wolfbeat; Miscellaneous
- Genres: Orchestra; choir; world
- Length: 100:50
- Languages: English; Constructed languages
- Labels: Amazon; Mutant

Bear McCreary chronology
| The Singularity (2024) | The Lord of the Rings: The Rings of Power (Season Two) (2024) | Elven Kings Under the Sky (2024) |

Singles from The Lord of the Rings: The Rings of Power (Season Two)
- 1. "The Last Ballad of Damrod" Released: August 8, 2024; 2. "Old Tom Bombadil" Released: August 15, 2024

Two songs from the season were released as digital singles: "The Last Ballad of Damrod" featuring Jens Kidman was released by Roadrunner Records on August 8, 2024; and "Old Tom Bombadil" featuring Rufus Wainwright was released by Amazon Music on August 15. A soundtrack album featuring selections from McCreary's score for the season was released digitally by Amazon Music on August 23, and physically by Mutant for CD and vinyl on November 29. Additional albums featuring the full score for each episode were also released, as was a box set collecting the season album and all eight episode albums. All music for the season album was composed by Bear McCreary:

Track listing
| No. | Title | Length |
|---|---|---|
| 1. | "Old Tom Bombadil" (featuring Rufus Wainwright) | 3:10 |
| 2. | "Rhûn" (featuring the Mystery of the Bulgarian Voices) | 2:35 |
| 3. | "Concerning Stoors" | 3:32 |
| 4. | "Golden Leaves" (featuring Benjamin Walker) | 3:19 |
| 5. | "Cirdan's Perfection" | 6:30 |
| 6. | "Stone Singers" (featuring Sophia Nomvete) | 1:15 |
| 7. | "Sandstorm at the Well" | 3:46 |
| 8. | "Eregion" | 3:42 |
| 9. | "Emissary at the Forge" | 6:36 |
| 10. | "Shelob" | 1:49 |
| 11. | "The Pyre" (featuring Raya Yarbrough) | 2:29 |
| 12. | "Estrid" | 3:13 |
| 13. | "The Great Eagle" | 2:57 |
| 14. | "The River-daughter" (featuring Raya Yarbrough) | 1:09 |
| 15. | "Barrow-wights" | 2:24 |
| 16. | "Forgiveness Takes an Age" | 2:40 |
| 17. | "Candles on the Tide" (featuring Clydene Jackson) | 3:40 |
| 18. | "Army of Orcs" | 4:11 |
| 19. | "The Last Ballad of Damrod" (featuring Jens Kidman) | 3:18 |
| 20. | "Battle for Eregion" | 11:33 |
| 21. | "Durin's Bane" | 8:38 |
| 22. | "Last Temptation" | 7:12 |
| 23. | "The Staff" | 4:17 |
| 24. | "Old Tom Bombadil Reprise" (featuring Rory Kinnear and Daniel Weyman) | 2:20 |
| 25. | "The Sun Yet Shines" | 4:35 |
| Total length: | | 100:50 |

== Marketing ==
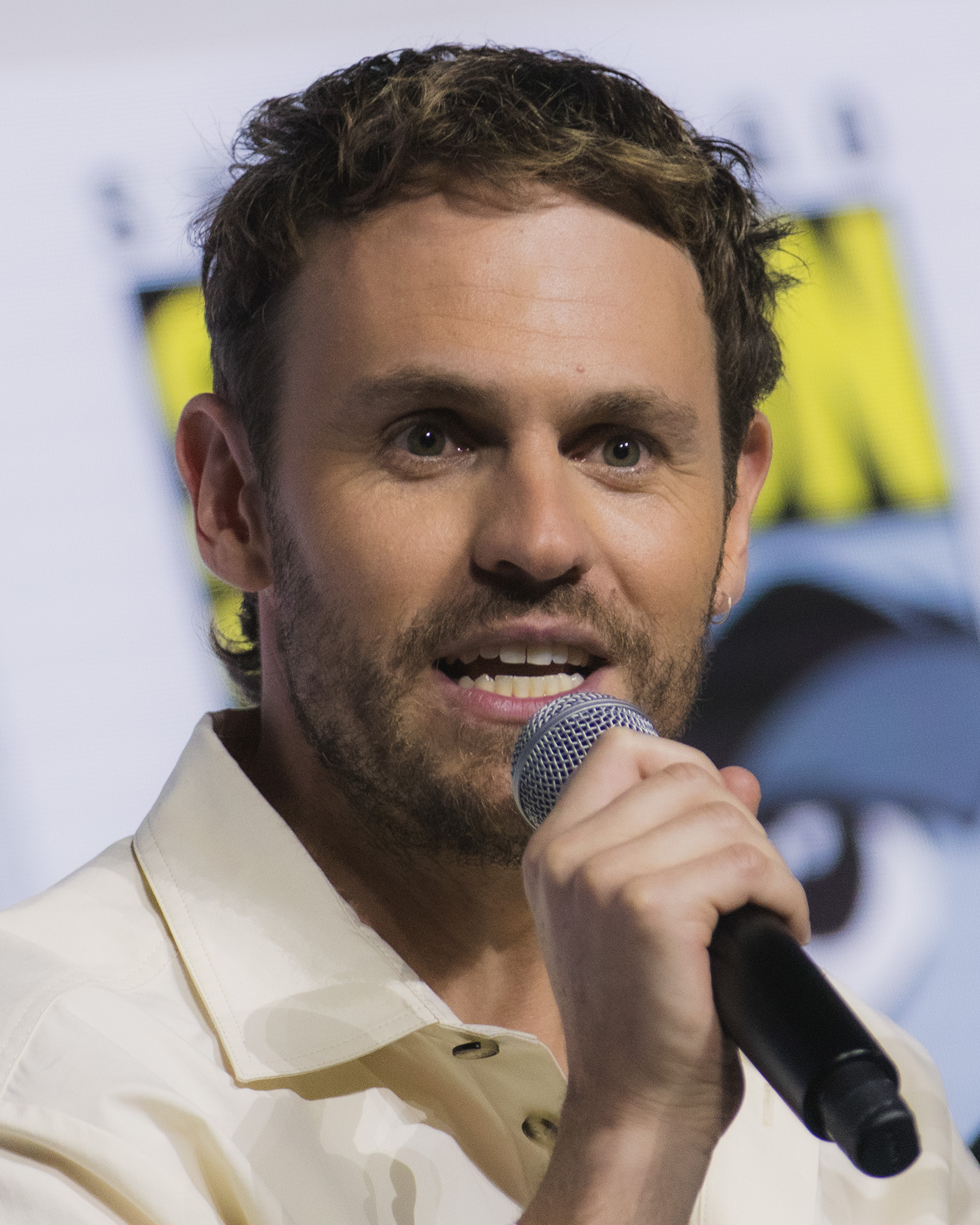
Charlie Vickers's Sauron was featured prominently in the season's marketing.

Amazon announced the season's premiere date and released the first teaser trailer and poster at its upfront presentation in May 2024. The teaser and poster both prominently feature Vickers's Sauron in his new Annatar disguise. Valerie Wu and Adam B. Vary of Variety described the teaser as "action-packed", which Martin Miller at The Playlist felt was in response to criticisms of the first season's lack of action. Writing for Deadline Hollywood, Dominic Patten said the teaser was "grittier and darker" than the first season. James Dyer at Empire said it was a reminder of the series' large scope, showing many of its characters and various creatures, although James Whitbrook of Gizmodo and Susana Polo of Polygon both noted that the teaser mostly focuses on Sauron and the Rings of Power, showing only brief glimpses of other storylines. Polo added that the teaser was "light on specific plot details".

The series was promoted at San Diego Comic-Con in July 2024 with a "press and influencer reception", a panel featuring the showrunners and cast, and a fan meet-and-greet with the cast held in conjunction with Tolkien fan website TheOneRing.net. The latter featured costumes and props from the season. The panel was moderated by Yvette Nicole Brown and opened with McCreary leading a performance of his Sauron and Orc themes arranged for male choir and drummers. The showrunners and members of the cast discussed the season, showed behind-the-scenes footage, and debuted a new trailer that was also released online. During the panel, Robert Strange "stormed on stage screaming his support of Adar" in full prosthetics and costume as his Orc character Glûg. Whitbrook said the trailer showed much more of the season's storylines than the teaser and felt the season was responding to fan concerns of the first season regarding the lack of action and key events. Zosha Millman at Polygon said the trailer looked like "the Lord of the Rings show we were promised" and highlighted the various Tolkien characters and creatures that appear in it. Leon Miller at The Escapist called the trailer "undeniably impressive" while Jennifer Ouellette of Ars Technica said it was one of the highlights of the convention. Gizmodo listed the series as one of ten "winners" at Comic-Con 2024, praising the panel for getting fans excited for the season and finding the trailer to be one of the convention's best.

A final trailer was released in mid-August ahead of the season's premiere. Whitbrook and Polo both said the trailer continued the marketing approach of focusing on Sauron's deception of Celebrimbor and the escalating conflicts in the season. Polo felt the large amount of action in the trailer was because the producers wanted to tell audiences that the first season was "just a preamble". Whitbrook was intrigued by the suggestion that Galadriel could join forces with Adar in the season, as was Rebekah Valentine at IGN who said the trailer was a "doozy" but wished that it showed more of the Stranger and Tom Bombadil. Fay Watson at Total Film described the trailer as epic, dark, and moody. She highlighted the reveal that there would be a confrontation between Galadriel and Sauron in the season. The next week, IGN released a featurette focused on Sauron which revealed Lowden's role as the character's previous form. This was also available to people who watched eight other character featurettes on Prime Video's explore page.

== Release ==
The season's world premiere was held at BFI Southbank in London on August 20, 2024. It premiered on Prime Video in the United States on August 29 with its first three episodes. The other five episodes were released weekly from September 5 to October 3. Episodes were released on the streaming service around the world at the same time as the US release, in more than 240 countries and territories.

Ahead of the third season's release in November 2026, a home media release for the first two seasons was announced. Each release features the eight episodes of the respective season along with behind-the-scenes content. They were released on 4K Ultra HD, Blu-ray, and DVD on November 3, and in limited edition 4K UHD SteelBook—with Amazon exclusive collectable art cards—on December 1.

== Reception ==
=== Viewership ===
Analytics company Samba TV—which gathers viewership data from three million smart TVs, weighted based on the US census—calculated that the first episode was viewed by 902,000 US households in its first four days. Katie Campione at Deadline Hollywood said this data "doesn't tell the whole viewing story" but did indicate a significant drop in interest from the premiere episode of the first season, which Samba found to be viewed by 1.8 million US households in its first three days. Luminate, which also gathers viewership data from US smart TVs, said the first three episodes were watched for 63.2 million minutes on their first day of release, less than the premiere of the fourth season of Prime Video's The Boys (79.9 million minutes viewed), and for 553.5 million minutes over the following four-day Labor Day weekend. The analytics company said the first season was watched for 1.2 billion minutes over its Labor Day weekend opening, and contrasted this drop with that of HBO's House of the Dragon which it found to have 10 million viewers for its first season premiere and 7.8 million for its second.

Before the season premiered, Amazon's television head Vernon Sanders said the company would only be releasing official viewership data for it "if there are things that feel like they really stand out". He added that, in addition to viewership, the company measured the series' success based on new signups to Prime Video and impacts on other areas of their business such as retail sales and music streaming. In an internal memo weeks later, Amazon Studios head Jennifer Salke said the season had been watched by 40 million viewers globally in its first 11 days of release, making it one of the top five most watched television seasons on Prime Video in that timeframe, with particular success in markets outside of the US. Campione characterized the season as "picking up steam" based on this data. Variety's Selome Hailu described it as "lagging behind" the first season, which Amazon said had 25 million viewers in its first day. James Hibberd of The Hollywood Reporter said Amazon's "spin" on the initial viewership was that a drop was inevitable due to how high the first season's numbers were.

Luminate said the series was watched for 764.7 million minutes during the week ending September 5, putting it second on the company's weekly streaming chart. It remained on the chart for the next four weeks, through the season finale's release day, with an average of 370 million minutes viewed each week. The series was also included on Samba TV's list of top streaming programs for each week of its release. Whip Media, which tracks viewership data for the 25 million worldwide users of its TV Time app, listed the series in the top three of its weekly US streaming chart for each week of release. It dropped to seventh place in the week after the season ended. Nielsen Media Research, which records streaming viewership on US television screens, estimated that The Rings of Power was the most-watched original streaming series for the week of its premiere with 1.02 billion minutes viewed in its first four days. This was below Nielsen's estimation for the first season's initial four days (1.25 billion) and included rewatches of first-season episodes. Nielsen listed the series in the top five of its most-watched original streaming series for the rest of the season, with an average of 845 million minutes viewed each week. It was in sixth-place with another 466 million minutes viewed for the week after the finale was released.

Ahead of the season finale's release, Salke said 55 million viewers had watched the season globally and the company expected more "growth and momentum" for it over time. When the third season was officially confirmed in February 2025, Amazon said the series was one of the strongest drivers for new Prime Video signups and the second season had become its most-watched returning season by number of hours watched. Lesley Goldberg of The Ankler reported in October that the season was finished by 10 percent more viewers than the first season, which was finished by 37 percent of its initial US viewers and 45 percent of international viewers.

=== Critical response ===
The Lord of the Rings: The Rings of Power season 2: Critical reception by episode
Percentage of positive critics' reviews tracked by the website Rotten Tomatoes

Review aggregator website Rotten Tomatoes calculated that 85% of 173 critics reviews for the season were positive, and the average of rated reviews was 7.25 out of 10. The website's critics consensus reads, "The Rings of Power's sophomore season discovers new virtues while retaining some of its predecessor's vices, overall making for a more kinetic journey through Tolkien's world." Metacritic assigned a weighted average score of 67 out of 100 based on 25 reviews, indicating a "generally favorable" response. Critics broadly felt that the series' production value remained high, with praise for the visuals, design work, and McCreary's score. The season was also seen to be more confident in its storytelling than the first, though some critics said it still had pacing issues and too many storylines—including multiple new characters and creatures.

Empire's Helen O'Hara praised the season and awarded it five stars out of five, saying every element was designed to "transport us to Middle-earth and carry us through its most horrifying, inspiring and sentimental moments... if you're a Tolkien fan, it's hard to imagine what more you could possibly ask for." Nick Schager at The Daily Beast called the season "suspenseful, graceful, and frequently breathtaking", and particularly praised Vickers's performance. He considered it to be better than the second season of fellow fantasy series House of the Dragon, with no "stagnant placeholder" episodes. Similarly, Melanie McFarland of Salon said the producers of House of the Dragon could learn from The Rings of Power's second season about pacing and ending a season leaving the audience anticipating the next. Kaiya Shunyata, reviewing the season for RogerEbert.com, found it to be a "major leap forward" for the series, with a tighter narrative, and called it "the most striking fantasy show of the year". She said Edwards and Vickers gave the best performances. Ben Travers of IndieWire graded the season a "B+", praising its themes, the time taken to develop key characters, and the ending, but finding the storylines focused on Men and the Stranger to be less interesting. Chase Hutchinson reviewed the season for The Seattle Times and called it a "welcome step up" from the first season, but said the series still struggled to balance all of its storylines and found the Stranger's story to be particularly extraneous. Keith Phipps, writing for TV Guide, said the season was "sometimes frustrating but just as often rewarding", praising the visuals in all storylines even though some are more interesting than others. He was particularly positive about Edwards, the Dwarves, and the Rhûn storyline. Several critics praised the depiction of the Siege of Eregion in the final episodes.

Angie Han of The Hollywood Reporter described the season as "too epic for its own good", praising the visuals but saying there were too many storylines and not enough focus on endearing the characters to the audience. Of critics who scored the season three stars out of five, The Guardian's Jack Seale said Sauron's manipulations provided drama in what is otherwise mostly lore; James Jackson at The Times also said Sauron's deception of Celebrimbor was the best part of the season, with particular praise for Edwards, while the other storylines were "hopelessly overcooked, thrilling and even scary at times, a real slog at others"; and Maddy Mussen of The Standard said there were too many storylines and the season had similar pacing issues to the first, criticizing the approach of "one battle for every eight hours of television" but praising Vickers's performance. For The Washington Post, Lili Loofbourow said the series "improves in its second season. But not enough". Bob Strauss at TheWrap found the season to be boring despite the "sumptuous" visuals. He criticized the characters and dialogue, but praised Edwards and Mullan. While Strauss found House of the Dragon to be superior, he said The Rings of Power delivered on its climactic battle where the second season of that series did not. Other negative responses include Nick Hilton's two star review for The Independent, in which he called the season a "mirthless rollercoaster ride, rarely fraught with any tension", and Alison Herman's review for Variety which called the season a "boring slog" made only for people interested in Tolkien's lore. Herman was unable to follow most of the storylines and locations, other than Sauron's scenes which she said were the most compelling.

=== Audience response ===
The day after the season premiered, its audience rating on Rotten Tomatoes was nearly double that of the first season. Hibberd noted that the first season's low rating had been partially attributed to review bombing amid a backlash to its diverse cast and other elements that were deemed to be "woke". He questioned whether the second season was considered "less woke" than the first and this had resulted in the improved rating. He also considered whether viewers were becoming more accepting of the series' take on the source material, or if people who disliked the first season had simply chosen not to watch and rate the second. Two weeks later, Hibberd described the second season's audience rating as "disappointing" despite the improved response. He said some of the viewers who gave the series negative reviews were "angrily determined to watch every episode while simultaneously insisting the show is unwatchable". Showrunner J. D. Payne said these were "trolls" and the creatives were focused on the "millions of people [who] are watching this and responding so positively to it". Sanders said the second season had not faced the same "racist hostility" as the first and Amazon found the majority of viewers to be open minded, engaged with the series, and not following an "agenda that's separate from the show itself".

=== Accolades ===
Vickers and Edwards were named honorable mentions for TVLine's "Performer of the Week", respectively for their performances in "Where the Stars are Strange" and "Doomed to Die". Edwards was also included on TV Insider's list of the best television performances of 2024 for his role in the season. The Rings of Power was named on multiple lists of best television series for 2024, including by Total Film (1st), Empire (4th), Inverse (9th), Time Out (13th), TV Insider (13th), /Film (14th), and Radio Times (46th), as well as by Gizmodo, Nerdist, and TechRadar on unranked lists. Additionally, "Doomed to Die" was listed as one of the best television episodes of the year by Total Film (1st), Mashable (20th), and IndieWire (27th), as well as by Entertainment Weekly on an unranked list. The season was one of 45 television series from the top 100 scripted series on industry database IMDbPro that received the ReFrame Stamp for the 2024 to 2025 television season. The stamp is awarded to productions that have gender-balanced hiring.

Accolades received by the second season of The Lord of the Rings: The Rings of Power
| Award | Date of ceremony | Category | Recipient(s) | Result | Ref. |
|---|---|---|---|---|---|
| Art Directors Guild Awards | February 15, 2025 | Excellence in Production Design for a One-Hour Fantasy Single-Camera Series | Kristian Milsted (for "Shadow and Flame") | Nominated | |
| Astra TV Awards | June 10, 2025 | Best Cast Ensemble in a Streaming Drama Series | The Lord of the Rings: The Rings of Power | Nominated | |
| British Academy Television Craft Awards | April 27, 2025 | Best Special, Visual & Graphic Effects | Jason Smith, Richard Bain, Ryan Conder, and Chris Rodgers | Won | |
| Costume Designers Guild Awards | February 6, 2025 | Excellence in Sci-Fi/Fantasy Television | Luca Mosca, Katherine Burchill, and Libby Dempster (for "Doomed to Die") | Nominated | |
| Golden Reel Awards | February 23, 2025 | Outstanding Achievement in Sound Editing – Broadcast Long Form Effects / Foley | Ben Barker, Glenn Freemantle, Emilie O'Connor, Paolo Pavesi, Zoe Freed, and Rebecca Heathcote (for "Doomed to Die") | Nominated | |
| Golden Reel Awards | February 23, 2025 | Outstanding Achievement in Music Editing – Broadcast Long Form | Jason Smith (for "Doomed to Die") | Nominated | |
| Golden Trailer Awards | May 29, 2025 | Best Fantasy Adventure (Trailer/Teaser) – TV/Streaming Series | Major Major (for "Dark Lord") | Nominated | |
| Golden Trailer Awards | May 29, 2025 | Best Fantasy Adventure (Trailer/Teaser) – TV/Streaming Series | AV Squad (for "Shadow") | Nominated | |
| Golden Trailer Awards | May 29, 2025 | Best Graphics in a (Trailer/Teaser) – TV/Streaming Series | BOND | Won | |
| Golden Trailer Awards | May 29, 2025 | Best BTS/EPK for a TV/Streaming Series (Under 2 minutes) | SunnyBoy Entertainment (for "On Set With Morfydd and Charlie") | Nominated | |
| Golden Trailer Awards | May 29, 2025 | Best BTS/EPK for a TV/Streaming Series (Over 2 minutes) | SunnyBoy Entertainment (for "A Look Inside Season 2") | Nominated | |
| International Film Music Critics Association Awards | February 27, 2025 | Score of the Year | Bear McCreary | Won | |
| International Film Music Critics Association Awards | February 27, 2025 | Composer of the Year | Bear McCreary | Won | |
| International Film Music Critics Association Awards | February 27, 2025 | Composition of the Year | Bear McCreary (for "Battle for Eregion") | Nominated | |
| International Film Music Critics Association Awards | February 27, 2025 | Composition of the Year | Bear McCreary (for "The Sun Yet Shines") | Nominated | |
| International Film Music Critics Association Awards | February 27, 2025 | Best Original Score for Television | Bear McCreary | Won | |
| Kids' Choice Awards | June 21, 2025 | Favorite Family TV Show | The Lord of the Rings: The Rings of Power | Nominated | |
| Make-Up Artists & Hair Stylists Guild Awards | February 15, 2025 | Best Special Make-Up Effects | Barrie Gower, Sarah Gower, Paul Spateri, and Emma Faulks | Nominated | |
| Primetime Creative Arts Emmy Awards | September 7, 2025 | Outstanding Special Visual Effects in a Season or a Movie | Jason Smith, Tim Keene, Ann Podlozny, James Yeoman, Daniele Bigi, Greg Butler, Ara Khanikian, Laurens Ehrmann, and Ryan Conder | Nominated | |
| Saturn Awards | February 2, 2025 | Best Fantasy Television Series | The Lord of the Rings: The Rings of Power | Nominated | |
| Set Decorators Society of America Awards | August 10, 2025 | Best Achievement in Décor/Design of a One Hour Fantasy or Science Fiction Series | Tina Jones and Kristian Milsted | Nominated | |
| Society of Composers & Lyricists Awards | February 12, 2025 | Outstanding Original Score for a Television Production | Bear McCreary | Nominated | |
| Society of Composers & Lyricists Awards | February 12, 2025 | Outstanding Original Song for a Dramatic or Documentary Visual Media Production | Bear McCreary (for "Old Tom Bombadil") | Nominated | |
| Visual Effects Society Awards | February 11, 2025 | Outstanding Visual Effects in a Photoreal Episode | Jason Smith, Tim Keene, Ann Podlozny, Ara Khanikian, and Ryan Conder (for "Eldest") | Nominated | |
| Visual Effects Society Awards | February 11, 2025 | Outstanding Environment in an Episode, Commercial, or Real-Time Project | Yordan Petrov, Bertrand Cabrol, Lea Desrozier, and Karan Dhandha (for Eregion in "Doomed to Die") | Nominated | |
| Visual Effects Society Awards | February 11, 2025 | Outstanding Effects Simulations in an Episode, Commercial, or Real-Time Project | Koenraad Hofmeester, Miguel Perez Senent, Miguel Santana Da Silva, and Billy Copley (for Balrog Fire and Collapsing Cliff in "Shadow and Flame") | Nominated | |
| World Soundtrack Awards | October 15, 2025 | Television Composer of the Year | Bear McCreary | Nominated | |

== Companion media ==
An episode of the official aftershow Inside The Rings of Power, featuring actress Felicia Day who is the host of The Official The Lord of the Rings: The Rings of Power Podcast, was released on Prime Video and YouTube following the debut of each episode of the season. The aftershow features interviews with cast and crew as well as behind-the-scenes footage for each episode.
