= The Lord of the Rings: The Rings of Power season 3 =

2026 television season

The Lord of the Rings: The Rings of Power
- Season 3
- Promotional poster
- Showrunners: J. D. Payne; Patrick McKay
- No. of episodes: 6

Release
- Original network: Amazon Prime Video
- Original release: November 11, 2026 – present

Season chronology
- ← Previous; Season 2 Next → Season 4

The third season of the American fantasy television series The Lord of the Rings: The Rings of Power is based on J. R. R. Tolkien's history of Middle-earth, primarily material from the appendices of the novel The Lord of the Rings (1954–55). Set thousands of years before the novel in Middle-earth's Second Age, the season takes place five years after the second at the height of a war between the Elves and the Dark Lord Sauron. It depicts the latter's efforts to create the One Ring, which could give him the power to win the war and conquer all of Middle-earth. The season is produced by Amazon MGM Studios in association with New Line Cinema and with J. D. Payne and Patrick McKay as showrunners.

Amazon acquired the television rights to The Lord of the Rings in November 2017 and made a multi-season commitment for a new series. Despite speculation about the series' future, a third season was expected to be made following the second season's release in October 2024. Writing had begun by then, and the season was officially confirmed in February 2025. Filming began in the United Kingdom in May, with Charlotte Brändström, Sanaa Hamri, and Stefan Schwartz directing episodes. Much of the series' large international cast returned from the previous seasons, as did composer Bear McCreary. Location filming took place around the UK, and filming wrapped in October 2025.

The season premiered on the streaming service Amazon Prime Video on November 11, 2026, with its first four episodes. The next two episodes were released on November 18 and the final two will be released on November 24. Reviews were generally positive, with critics highlighting the visuals and the performances of the cast, and finding the season to be more focused than the previous two, but some still criticized the pacing and the large amount of lore.

== Episodes ==
No. overall	No. in season	Title	Directed by	Written by	Original release date
17	1	"Marnûkh"	Charlotte Brändström	J. D. Payne & Patrick McKay	November 11, 2026
Five years following the fall of Eregion, Sauron has conquered much of western Middle-earth. The Elves resist at the borders of Lindon and Rivendell using the uncorrupted Elven rings, but suffer heavy casualties. Sauron recruits Men to serve as his Nazgnagôl or 'Ring-Servants', corrupting them with the rings of Men. Galadriel is troubled by visions of Sauron and loneliness due to her lost husband Celeborn. King Durin IV of Khazad-dûm opposes Sauron but cannot join war without his people's support, while Númenor and Rhûn have yet to declare for a side. Durin IV's estranged brother Thrain and lords of the other Dwarven realms arrive to Khazad-dûm with the lords asking for the Dwarven rings, which Durin IV refuses. An Orc named Marnûkh surrenders at Khazad-dûm with information for Galadriel. Sauron tries forging his master ring at Barad-dûr in Mordor but keeps failing without Celebrimbor's knowledge. Easterlings arrive from Rhûn bearing an alliance offer from the Dark Wizard, but Sauron convinces them into betrayal to reclaim their land, having them fight for a ring, with Khamûl victorious. At Pelargir, the Númenorean colony continues to expand while oppressing Theo and his people. Theo goes with a party to Mordor, seeking a ring for themselves.
18	2	"The Gift of Men"	Charlotte Brändström	Justin Doble	November 11, 2026
King Pharazôn survives an assassination attempt by the Faithful in Númenor. Eärien warns the deposed Queen Míriel and her Faithful followers, including Isildur, that Pharazôn is aware of their plans to flee to a western enclave. Pharazôn is growing concerned over the rising power of Sauron. While Isildur uses a Palantir to warn his father Elendil about Pharazôn's plan, Eärien is exposed as a Faithful double agent and escapes capture by committing suicide. In Middle-earth, Elrond and Arondir bring Marnûkh to Galadriel in Rivendell. Marnûkh tells of Sauron's designs on Rhûn and his attempts to forge a master ring, revealing he still believes in Adar. When Eregion fell, Marnûkh secreted a surviving apprentice of Celebrimbor named Maitalle to the Orc stronghold at Mount Gundabad in the Misty Mountains. At Barad-dûr, Theo survives fighting his own people for a ring, and Sauron seduces him by claiming that his late father was a Mordorian noble whom his mother Bronwyn murdered. Lossoth and Haradrim Nazgnagôl travel to Khazad-dûm, seeking information from King Durin IV on Marnûkh. While Durin IV refuses them, Thrain secretly meets the Nazgnagôl, with whom he is in league, revealing that the Elves have taken Marnûkh.
19	3	"The Secret Fire"	Sanaa Hamri	J. D. Payne & Patrick McKay	November 11, 2026
In Rhûn, Khamûl uses his ring to overcome the Dark Wizard's magic, blackmailing him for his authority over the Easterlings. Gandalf and Tom Bombadil infiltrate the Dark Wizard's fortress but disagree on fighting him. After releasing a corrupted oliphaunt from the Dark Wizard's spell, Gandalf experiences a vision of the Secret Fire. He learns that the Dark Wizard is the Istari Pallando, who murdered his companion Alatar and turned Rhûn into a desert. Realizing he is to try and redeem Pallando, Gandalf returns to Tom's cottage but finds that he has left Rhûn. Elsewhere, Galadriel travels with Arondir and Marnûkh towards Mount Gundabad to rescue Maitalle. Nazgnagôl look for them but are thrown off by distractions Galadriel creates with her ring. Arondir mistrusts Marnûkh and is sent away by Galadriel, yet realizing Marnûkh's sincerity he rejoins them as they reach Mount Gundabad. At Barad-dûr, Sauron learns from two Elven captives that Marnûkh took Maitalle to Mount Gundabad. At the Faithful haven in western Númenor, Elendil and his son Anárion hunt for an apparent spy. However, Elendil is captured in a sting operation by Kemen. Anárion fights Pharazôn's soldiers but is unable to stop them from capturing his father.
20	4	"Gundabad"	Sanaa Hamri	Justin Doble	November 11, 2026
Marnûkh brings Galadriel and Arondir into Mount Gundabad, disguised as his prisoners. Marnûkh and Arondir find Maitalle dead, but discover Galadriel's lost husband Celeborn and free him. Before they can escape with Galadriel, Sauron arrives on a fell beast accompanied by Nazgnagôl. Marnûkh is incapacitated by Theo who has become a Nazgnagôl. Arondir tries reasoning with Theo, who initially hesitates but then kills his former friend. Galadriel and Celeborn are rescued by a great eagle. In Khazad-dûm, Thrain challenges Durin IV's kingship asserting that Durin III was of unsound mind when naming him heir while wearing a ring. Disa tells Durin IV about a one-night fling with Thrain before their marriage lest Thrain provoke him with it. But Durin IV's son Gamli later tells his father of seeing Disa and Thrain together when Thrain had failed to coax Disa for support, Gamli mistakenly thinking they were having an affair, which provokes Durin IV into starting the trial by combat unprepared. Thrain wins and is proclaimed the new king. In Lindon, Elrond and Círdan convince the High King Gil-galad to seek Pharazôn's help, and Elrond accompanies him to Númenor. In Númenor, Anárion and Faithful soldiers rescue Elendil and capture Kemen.
21	5	"The Lady of Lórien"	Sanaa Hamri	J. D. Payne & Patrick McKay	November 18, 2026
At Barad-dûr, Sauron tortures Marnûkh into revealing where the great eagle went. Galadriel and Celeborn are dropped on the edge of Greenwood, continuing on foot towards Arondir's ancestral home of Eryn Galen, the realm of the Wood Elves. Galadriel hesitates telling everything that has happened since Celeborn was lost, but he soothes her fears and shares how his memories and dreams of her kept him going. While Sauron's forces search for them through the forest, they take refuge atop a tree and kiss for the first time in thousands of years. During the night, Galadriel has a vision of Sauron and falls down in danger of being discovered. Celeborn gives himself up claiming that he is alone, and Sauron orders he be brought to Mordor. Elrond arrives in Númenor with Gil-galad to treat with Pharazôn for aid against Sauron's forces. Pharazôn is open to toppling Sauron but insists that the Elves help him deal with the Faithful first. In Rhûn, Gandalf attempts to sway the fallen Pallando back to the side of goodness, but fearful of Sauron, Pallando refuses and incapacitates Gandalf, with Khamûl intending to offer him to Sauron as a gift.
22	6	"From Valinor"	Stefan Schwartz	Justin Doble	November 18, 2026
Theo finds Galadriel and asks for her help in removing his ring, unable to do it himself. As Theo starts to recover from corruption, he and Galadriel travel towards Mordor to rescue Celeborn. Sauron tortures Celeborn, believing Maitalle told him of Celebrimbor's craft. Sauron taunts Celeborn by claiming to have had Galadriel for himself, but Celeborn spurns Sauron, knowing he has an eternal bond with Galadriel that Sauron will never have. Sauron disguises himself as Galadriel and tricks Celeborn into revealing the secret of the Elven rings is gold and silver from Valinor. In Khazad-dûm, Thrain blackmails Disa to search for the Dwarven rings Durin IV hid by threatening their children. Feigning compliance and guiding Thrain's supporters, Disa knocks them out with the help of Durin IV, whom she freed from his prison cave with her stone-singing power. Durin IV vows to reclaim his kingdom. In Númenor, Gil-Galad and Elrond mediate the conflict between the King's Men and the Faithful, Elrond reminding them of his twin brother Elros who chose the mortal life of Men becoming Númenor's first ruler. Gil-Galad uses his ring to restore Míriel's sight. Míriel parleys with Pharazôn who proposes marriage to reunite Númenor under his rule.
23	7	TBA	Stefan Schwartz	J. D. Payne & Patrick McKay & Justin Doble	November 24, 2026
24	8	TBA	Charlotte Brändström	J. D. Payne & Patrick McKay	November 24, 2026

== Cast and characters ==
=== Starring ===
- Morfydd Clark as Galadriel
- Charlie Vickers as Sauron
- Jamie Campbell Bower as Celeborn
- Ismael Cruz Córdova as Arondir
- Tyroe Muhafidin as Theo
- Robert Aramayo as Elrond and Elros
- Owain Arthur as Durin IV
- Sophia Nomvete as Disa
- Benjamin Walker as Gil-galad
- Daniel Weyman as Gandalf
- Trystan Gravelle as Pharazôn
- Maxim Baldry as Isildur
- Cynthia Addai-Robinson as Míriel
- Lloyd Owen as Elendil
- Ciarán Hinds as the Dark Wizard
- Andrew Richardson as Anárion
- Rory Kinnear as Tom Bombadil

=== Supporting ===
- Adam Young as Marnûkh
- Leon Wadham as Kemen
- Eddie Marsan as Thrain
- Ben Daniels as Círdan
- Kevin Eldon as Narvi
- Lee Braithwaite as Gamli
- Amber Mendez-Martin as Gerda
- Will Keen as Belzagar
- Ema Horvath as Eärien

=== Other ===
- Daniel Scott-Smith as Shâgad
- Paul Hickey as the Lossoth Nazgnagôl
- Charles Edwards as Celebrimbor
- Zubin Varla as Khamûl
- Cyril Nri as the Harad Nazgnagôl
- Allan Corduner as the voice of the Secret Fire
- Rachel Payne as Brenna
- Charlotte Keith as Hilda
- Ross Hatt as Balbur
- John Cummins as Frór
- Emily Lloyd-Saini as Freyja
- Simon Pegg as the voice of the Balrog

== Production ==
=== Development ===
Amazon acquired the television rights for J. R. R. Tolkien's The Lord of the Rings (1954–55) in November 2017. The company's streaming service, Amazon Prime Video, gave a multi-season commitment to a series based on the novel and its appendices that was believed to be for five seasons, to be produced by Amazon MGM Studios in association with New Line Cinema and in consultation with the Tolkien Estate. The budget was expected to be around US$100–150 million per season, and the streaming service had to give a formal greenlight to future seasons before work could begin on them. J. D. Payne and Patrick McKay were hired to develop the series in July 2018, and were named showrunners a year later. The series' title, The Lord of the Rings: The Rings of Power, was announced in January 2022. In August, Amazon explained that the deal with Tolkien's estate required the company to keep the series distinct from Peter Jackson's The Lord of the Rings (2001–2003) and The Hobbit (2012–2014) film adaptations. Despite this, the showrunners intended for it to be visually consistent with the films.

Amazon's television head Vernon Sanders said in December 2022 that the company was committed to Payne and McKay's five-season plan and work had already been done on the third season. He said there had not been any official announcements due to their focus on the in-production second season, but he expected the renewal to be announced in "the new year". In August 2023, the third season was included in a report of in-development projects. By February 2024, when Payne and McKay extended their overall deal with Amazon MGM Studios, the pair had started outlining the season's story. It had not yet been officially ordered and a writers' room had not been opened. The lack of official announcements led to speculation about the series' future among fans, especially considering the second season was ordered years before the first was released. Around the second season's premiere in August 2024, Payne and McKay said they were working on the third season, and they did not have any contingency plans should Amazon choose to end the series earlier than five seasons.

Stefan Schwartz joined the series to direct episodes of the third season.

In early September 2024, Amazon was reported to be committed to the five-season plan after seeing the second season's initial viewership. This was despite a significant drop in viewership from the first season and ongoing concerns about the series' quality from some critics and viewers. By early October, when the second season finished airing, a writers' room had been opened for the third season and the showrunners said they were "deep in the writing process". Amazon Studios head Jennifer Salke said there was "no debate about whether or not the show will continue", and an official renewal was reported to be coming by the end of the month. Prime Video officially confirmed the third season in February 2025. Charlotte Brändström, Sanaa Hamri, and Stefan Schwartz were each set to direct multiple episodes. After being elevated to producing director for the second season, Brändström was made an executive producer for the third. Hamri also returned from the second season, while Schwartz was newly hired for the third. Payne, McKay, Lindsey Weber, Justin Doble, and Kate Hazell were also executive producers.

=== Writing ===
The writers' room for the season included Payne, McKay, Doble, Ben Tagoe, Ava Wong Davies, Constance Cheng, Jonathan Wilson, Griff Jones, and Sarah Anson. Their work was underway by October 2024. The showrunners structured the series so each season would be built around several "major tentpole moments" from Tolkien's history of the Second Age of Middle-earth; the third season takes place at the height of the "War of the Elves and Sauron", and depicts the Dark Lord Sauron creating the One Ring. The writers took two sections of Tolkien's history for the "War of the Elves and Sauron", the Battle of the Gwathló and the end of the war, and "braided them into one narrative" with a compressed timeline. They wanted the season to be more focused than the "sprawl" of the first two, with the different characters and storylines being unified by Sauron and the forging of the One Ring.

The season begins after a five-year time jump. The showrunners hoped this, and the opening prologue which recaps the events of the war so far, would start the third season with momentum and entice new viewers. During the time jump, the Elven realm of Rivendell and Sauron's tower Barad-dûr are constructed, and Sauron's Orcs spread across Middle-earth leaving only "a few pockets of resistance": the Elven realms of Lindon and Rivendell that are protected by the Elvish Rings of Power, and the Dwarven realm of Khazad-dûm. After the build up of the first two seasons, this season depict key characters as fully formed, including Sauron, who the showrunners described as a "full-on villain" in the season; and Gandalf, who has become "the wizard we all love from Tolkien's writings". Key characters from Tolkien's writings are introduced, such as Galadriel's husband Celeborn, and the Men who receive nine Rings of Power from Sauron. The latter are called "Nazgûl", which means "Ringwraiths" in Tolkien's constructed language of Black Speech, and the season shows their transition into wraiths. Before that happens, they are called "Nazgnagôl" which the writers derived from Black Speech as a translation for "Ring-servants".

While Galadriel and Celeborn are together during the Second Age in Tolkien's writings, in the series Celeborn has been missing since the First Age and is believed to be dead. The showrunners explained that the appendices, which the series is primarily based on, do not include many "interesting" details about what Celeborn was doing during the Second Age. They decided to create a new story where he is imprisoned by Orcs during that time. They said the reunion between Galadriel and Celeborn in the third season was the first true love story that the series had told, and was placed during this season's war story because that felt like "the most surprising moment" for him to return. The season includes a flashback that shows when Galadriel and Celeborn first met and how his loss impacted her, before exploring how his return brings out new sides of her character.

=== Location ===
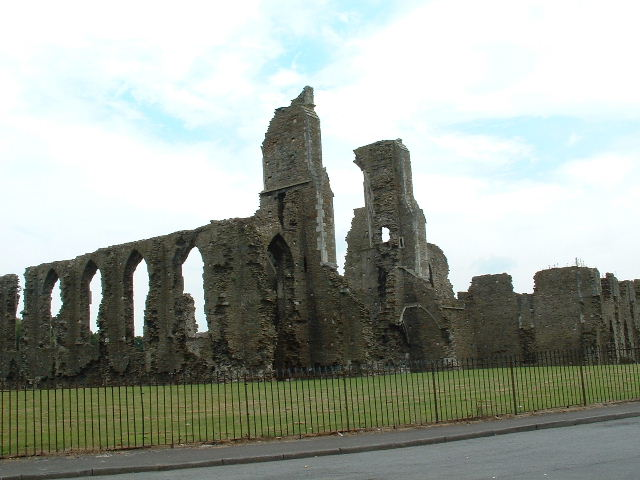
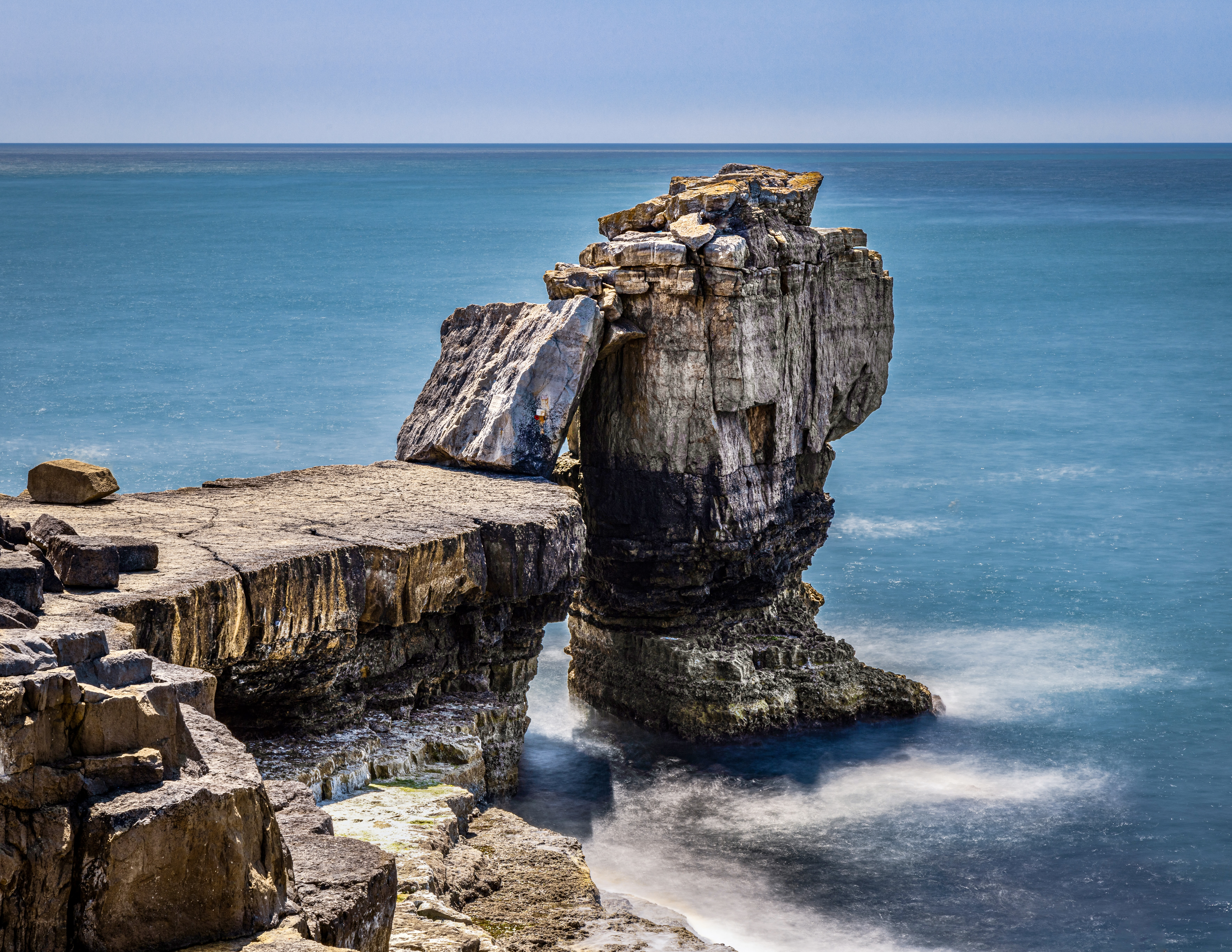
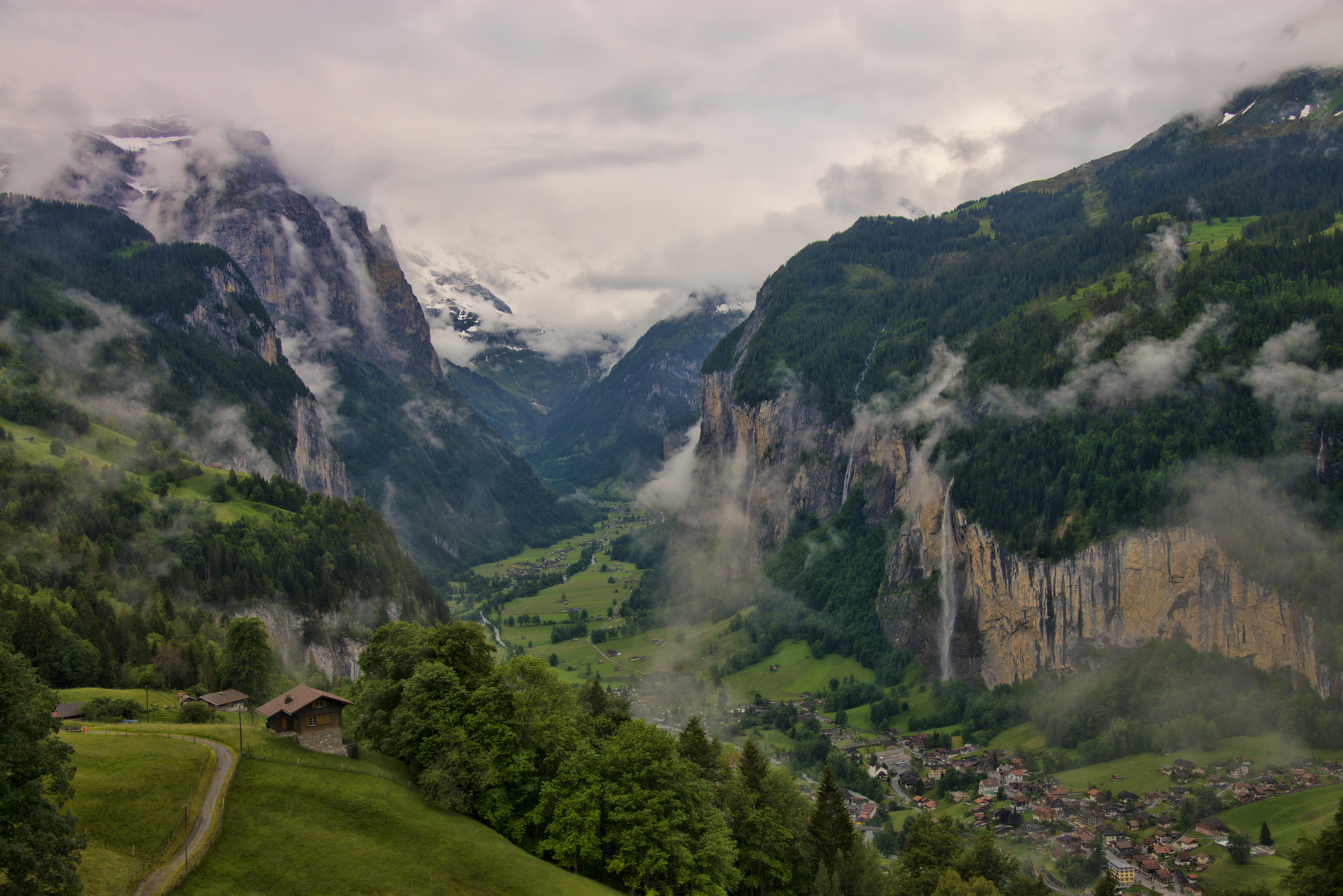
14 filming locations were used for the season, including (left-to-right) Windsor Great Park, Neath Abbey, and Portland Bill in the UK, and the valley of Lauterbrunnen in Switzerland.

In August 2022, Amazon announced that it was moving production of the series from New Zealand, where Jackson's films and the first season were made, to the United Kingdom starting with the second season. In February 2024, production for the third season was expected to be moved from Bray Film Studios in Berkshire, where the second season was filmed, to Shepperton Studios in Surrey, after Amazon signed a long-term deal for exclusive use of new facilities at Shepperton in February 2022. The second season was originally intended to be made at Shepperton but the expanded facilities were not ready on time. Amazon acquired Bray Film Studios in July 2024, and Salke indicated in October that the series could continue to be produced there. However, production was confirmed to have moved to Shepperton Studios in February 2025, with pre-production underway.

Finlay Bradbury was the supervising location manager for the season. 14 filming locations were used, primarily on private estates and in Windsor Great Park on the border of Berkshire and Surrey. Other locations included Neath Abbey in South Wales, which is the ruins of a 12th century abbey and the only existing building used by the production; and Portland Bill, a promontory on the coast of the Isle of Portland in Dorset. Additionally, the visual effects team scanned the valley of Lauterbrunnen in Switzerland, which Tolkien was inspired by when creating Rivendell, to recreate it for the season's depiction of Rivendell.

=== Casting ===
Cast members who returned from the previous seasons include Cynthia Addai-Robinson as Míriel, Robert Aramayo as Elrond, Owain Arthur as Durin IV, Maxim Baldry as Isildur, Morfydd Clark as Galadriel, Ismael Cruz Córdova as Arondir, Ben Daniels as Círdan, Charles Edwards as Celebrimbor, Kevin Eldon as Narvi, Trystan Gravelle as Pharazôn, Ciarán Hinds as the Dark Wizard, Ema Horvath as Eärien, Will Keen as Belzagar, Rory Kinnear as Tom Bombadil, Tyroe Muhafidin as Theo, Sophia Nomvete as Disa, Lloyd Owen as Elendil, Charlie Vickers as Sauron, Leon Wadham as Kemen, Benjamin Walker as Gil-galad, and Daniel Weyman as Gandalf. Aramayo also portrays Elrond's brother Elros in a flashback.

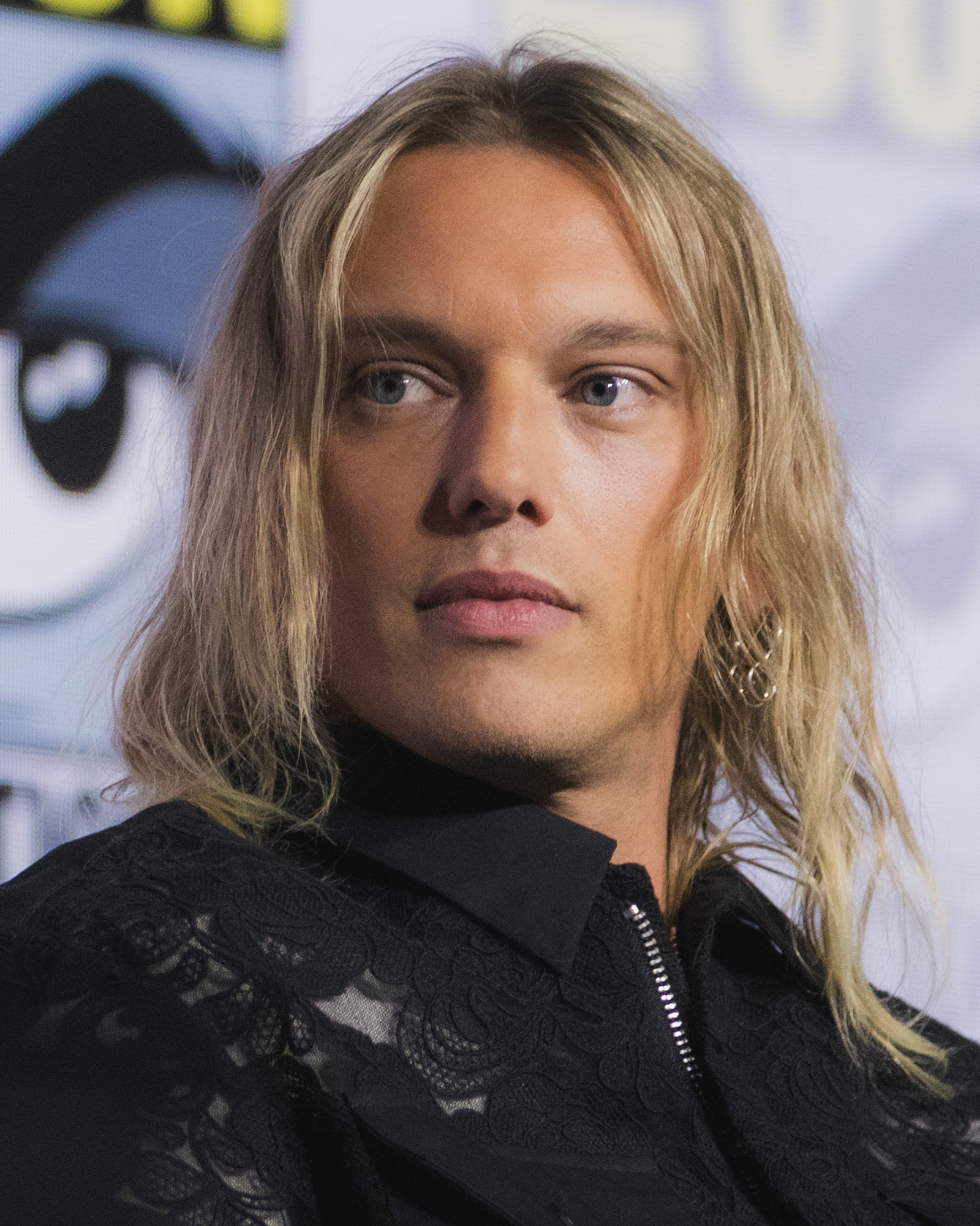
Jamie Campbell Bower joined the season's cast in the major role of Celeborn, husband to Galadriel.

In February 2025, Amazon announced the casting of Jamie Campbell Bower as a series regular and Eddie Marsan in a recurring role. Bower's character was reported to be the biggest addition for the season, described as a "handsome high-born knight" with the code name "Arlen" who was potentially a new love interest for Galadriel. There was speculation that he could be portraying Celeborn, who was played by Marton Csokas in Jackson's films. Marsan's role, code named "Dromm", reportedly required a Scottish accent like the series' Dwarves and was said to have a brother, leading to speculation that he could be playing the brother of Durin IV that was mentioned at the end of the second season. Further casting was announced in June 2025 after filming began: Andrew Richardson as a series regular, with Zubin Varla and Adam Young in recurring roles. This announcement came following reports of casting for a "sea captain in his 20s" who would be a series regular for the season. Varla provided additional voice work for three episodes of the second season; it was unclear whether his new role was related to that voice work.

Roles for the previously announced cast members were revealed in July 2026, with Bower confirmed to be portraying Celeborn. Payne said they received hundreds of audition tapes for the role and chose Bower due to his "rich and hypnotic" voice as well as his chemistry with Clark, which felt "so natural, and so organic". Richardson was revealed to be portraying Anárion, the younger son of Elendil and Isildur's brother from Tolkien's writings. Marsan was confirmed to be playing Durin's brother, Thrain, and Young was cast as a mysterious Orc named Marnûkh. Varla was revealed to be portraying Khamûl the Easterling, one of the Nazgnagôl; Khamûl is the one Nazgûl whose name was revealed by Tolkien. Also in July 2026, the showrunners revealed that the Balrog would return from previous seasons and would have a speaking role for the first time. They announced that Simon Pegg had been cast to provide the creature's voice. The next month, Amber Mendez-Martin and Lee Braithwaite were announced in the roles of Gerda and Gamli, respectively, the teenage children of Durin and Disa.

=== Design ===
Kristian Milsted returned as production designer from the second season, with Libby Dempster serving as costume designer for the third. The production had use of nine soundstages and a backlot at Shepperton, with an emphasis on creating practical sets for the actors to work in rather than relying on blue screens. Barrie and Sarah Gower's BGFX were the prosthetics house for the season.

=== Filming ===
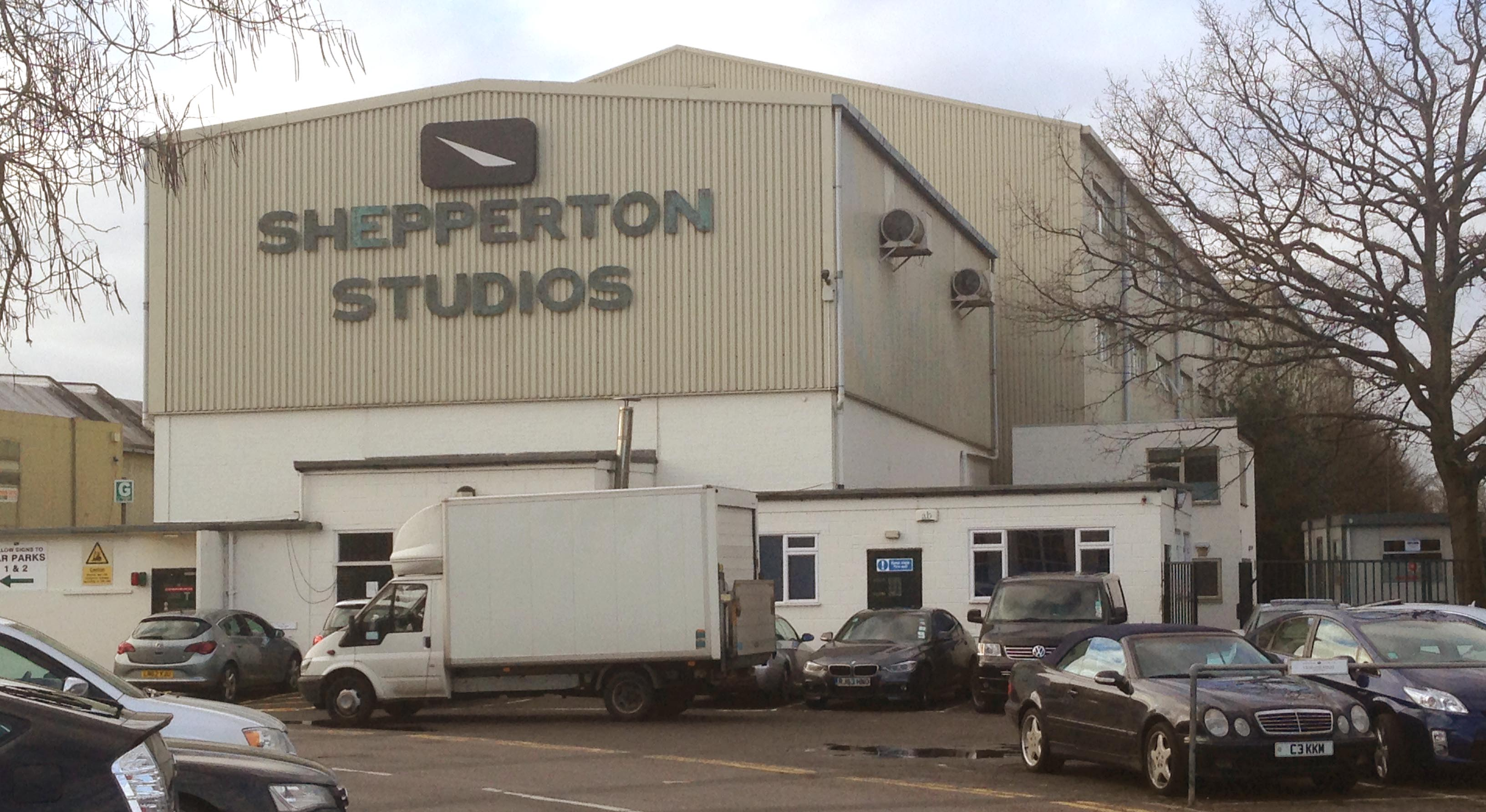
Filming for the season was based at Shepperton Studios.

Filming began in May 2025, under the working title MKT, and was set to continue for around seven months. Brändström, Hamri, and Schwartz directed the episodes, with up to four production units filming simultaneously. Alex Disenhof returned as Brändström's cinematographer from the previous seasons, with Gavin Struthers and Gavin Finney the cinematographers for Hamri and Schwartz, respectively. Vic Armstrong supervised the series' action sequences and was the lead second unit director, with Roy Taylor as stunt coordinator. A wrap party was held for the season at the end of October, and the end of production was officially confirmed in December.

Two weeks of location filming took place on Tilsey Farm, a private estate in Surrey, for the first episode's battle between Elves and Orcs. The sequence features 16 stunt performers and 10 extras playing Orcs, 8 stunt performers and 42 extras playing Wild Men, and 12 horses. The sequence where Sauron forges the One Ring took two weeks to film and was described by the showrunners as the most ambitious and technically challenging sequence in the series. Filming at Portland Bill took place at the start of October 2025 for a meeting between Elrond, Gil-galad, and Pharazôn. Filming specifically took place around Pulpit Rock and with a boat.

=== Visual effects ===
Visual effects were created by DNEG, Industrial Light & Magic (ILM), Rodeo FX, The Yard VFX, Untold Studios, Monsters Aliens Robots Zombies (MARZ), Lola VFX, Atomic Arts, Cantina Creative, Digikore, Cheap Shot, and Proof Inc. The different vendors were overseen by visual effects supervisor Jason Smith. Creatures that are depicted in the season include the Balrog, flying Fell beasts, and the Mûmakil war elephants.

=== Music ===
Composer Bear McCreary was "gearing up" for the season by early May 2025. McCreary said he was "bring[ing] everything back" from the previous seasons along with some new sounds for the franchise.

The Lord of the Rings: The Rings of Power (Season Three: Prime Original Series Soundtrack)

Film score by Bear McCreary
- Released: November 13, 2026
- Studios: Abbey Road; AIR; Synchron Stage Vienna; Trinity School; Sofia Session; Wolfbeat; Miscellaneous
- Genres: Orchestra; choir; world
- Languages: English; Constructed languages
- Labels: Amazon; Mutant

Bear McCreary chronology
Outlander: Blood of My Blood (Season 2) (2026)	The Lord of the Rings: The Rings of Power (Season Three) (2026)

Singles from The Lord of the Rings: The Rings of Power (Season Three)
- 1. "Morning Shall Come" Released: November 6, 2026

"Morning Shall Come", an original song by McCreary and Aurora, was released as a digital single by Fontana Records on November 6, 2026. A soundtrack album featuring selections from McCreary's score for the season will be released digitally by Amazon Music on November 13, and physically by Mutant for CD and vinyl on a later date. An expanded digital collector's edition of the soundtrack will also be released. All music for the season album was composed by Bear McCreary:

Track listing
No.	Title	Length
1.	"Morning Shall Come" (featuring Aurora)
2.	"Nazgnagôl" (featuring Jens Kidman and Morgan Sorne)
3.	"Hold Back the Shadow"
4.	"Thrain"
5.	"Insurrection in Númenor"
6.	"The Most Devoted" (featuring Katrine Stenbekk)
7.	"Crown of Khazad-dûm"
8.	"Celeborn"
9.	"Battle at Gundabad"
10.	"Fell Beast"
11.	"Mûmakil on the March"
12.	"Under Sun and Star"
13.	"Searching in Stone" (featuring Sophia Nomvete)
14.	"For Gerda and Gamli"
15.	"The Balrog"
16.	"Sammath Naur"
17.	"One for the Dark Lord"
18.	"Embarking from Barad-dûr"
19.	"Echoes of Ancient Music" (featuring Morfydd Clark)
20.	"Gandalf and the Dark Wizard"
21.	"The Doom of Men"
22.	"Where the Shadows Lie (for Children's Choir)"

== Marketing ==
Amazon released short behind-the-scenes teasers during filming for the season, including a teaser focused on Morgoth's crown which was released in July 2025, one focused on the sword Narsil which was released in September, and one focused on Gandalf's staff which was released in October. Jordan King at Empire said Amazon was using the item-based teasers to "whet the appetite of fans" during production.

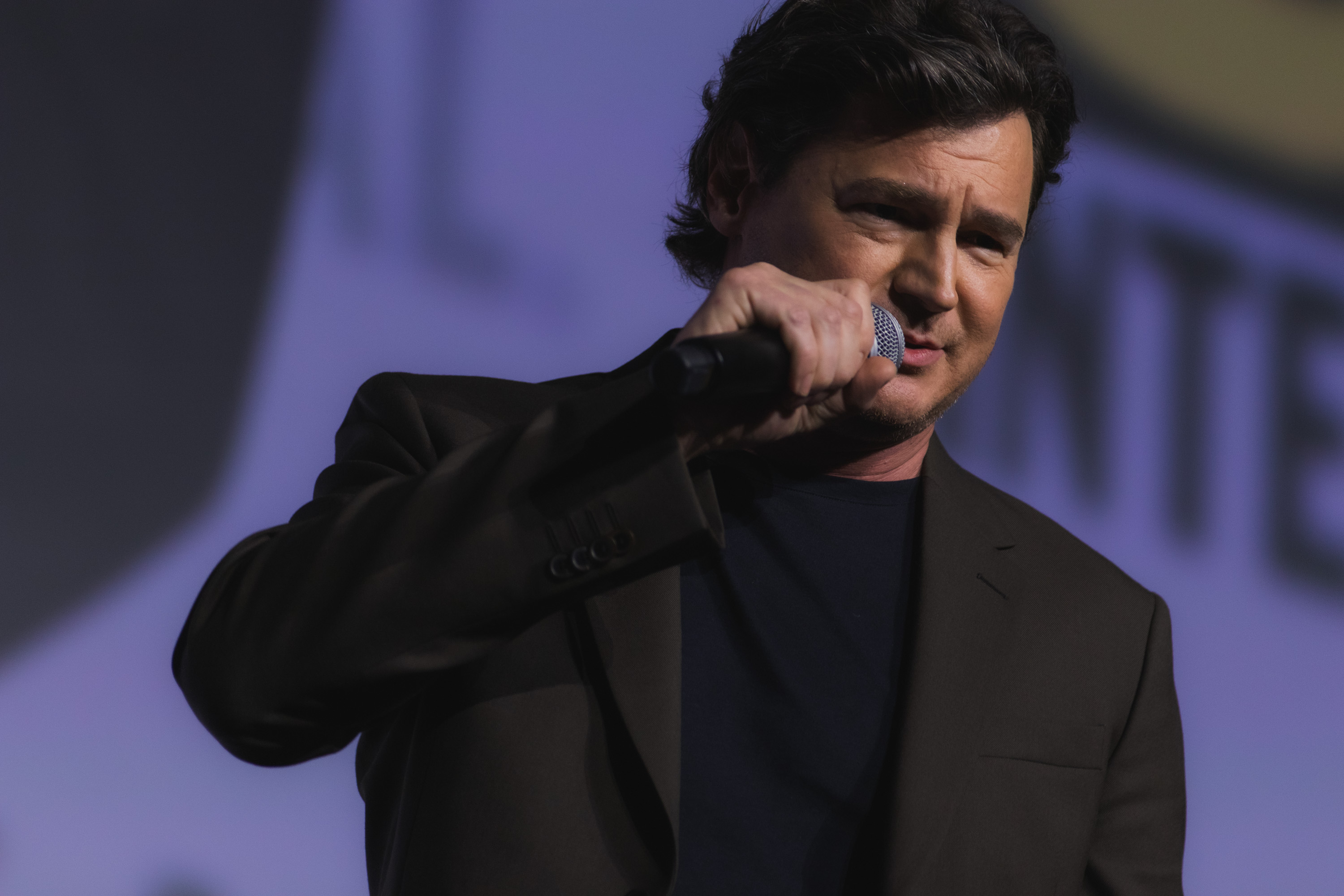
Star Benjamin Walker (Gil-galad) moderating the series' panel at San Diego Comic-Con in July 2026

The season was promoted at San Diego Comic-Con in July 2026 with a panel featuring the showrunners and cast, moderated by Walker. Several casting announcements were made, a teaser trailer and a behind-the-scenes featurette about the season's creatures were shown, and the panel was briefly interrupted by four performers who appeared on stage in costume as Nazgnagôl. The teaser was released online at the end of the panel, and was described as "action-packed" by multiple commentators. Matthew Byrd at Reactor said it was generous with the amount of footage included, especially considering how little had been seen of the season at that point, and said the teaser showed off the series' continued high production value. He felt it also showed a strong narrative drive that indicated continued momentum following the second season's improved pacing. Writing for Polygon, Sam Nelson said the series was "finally getting to the good stuff" after the slow pacing of the first two seasons, highlighting the forging of the One Ring and the appearance of future Nazgûl riding on Fell beasts. Lucas Manfredi of TheWrap said first looks at Celeborn and the forging of the One Ring were notable highlights of the teaser. The creature featurette was later released online as well. The announcement that the Balrog would speak in the season and the casting of Pegg as the voice were highlighted by multiple commentators. Discussing the properties that got the most "buzz" out of the convention, James Hibberd at The Hollywood Reporter noted The Rings of Power alongside its fellow Prime Video series Blade Runner 2099 (2026), which was promoted during the same panel. He said the "Harfoots-free" trailer for this season made it look like it could be the best season of the series so far.

The official trailer for the season was released in October 2026. As with the teaser, the full trailer was described as "action-packed" by multiple commentators. Several highlighted the forging of the One Ring and Sauron putting it on, with Kofi Outlaw at ComicBook.com believing the entire series "may well hinge on just how well [the forging sequence] is adapted for the screen". Ryan Britt of Inverse noted that the forging of the ring was briefly seen in Jacksons's films, and the series was moving closer to Tolkien lore that more casual audiences would be familiar with. King, writing for Empire, said it was "a whole lot of trailer" with many creatures, characters, and key moments, and he could not wait for the season to premiere. He also noted the unlikely "love triangle" that was being hinted at between Galadriel, Celeborn, and Sauron. /Film's Jeremy Mathai felt, based on the trailer, that the season was bringing together all of the narrative threads from the first two seasons and could be the "main course" that the series had been building to. At TwitchCon San Diego in November, a one-off tabletop adventure game will be held featuring members of the Critical Role and Rings of Power casts.

== Release ==
The season's world premiere was held at Queen Elizabeth Hall in London on November 10, 2026. It premiered on Prime Video in the United States on November 11 with its first four episodes, followed by the next two episodes on November 18. The final two episodes were originally set to be released on November 25. Episodes were released on the streaming service around the world at the same time as the US release, in more than 240 countries and territories. The seventh episode is set to debut in theatrical screenings on November 23 and 24, and the Prime Video release of the seventh and eighth episodes was moved up to November 24.

The block release schedule for the season was deemed unusual and confusing by some commentators, especially when the previous seasons had primarily weekly release schedules. Rotem Rusak at Nerdist questioned the approach, noting that four hour-long episodes would be released in a single week and the entire season would be finished in less than three weeks. He wondered if the story was specifically suited to this schedule, and acknowledged that finishing right before Thanksgiving would allow US viewers to watch the whole season during the holiday period. The showrunners stated that they advocated for more episodes to be released at once, as they believe the series' serialized storytelling lends itself to a binge model. They confirmed that they wanted families to be able to binge the entire season over the holiday period.

== Reception ==
=== Critical response ===
The Lord of the Rings: The Rings of Power season 3: Critical reception by episode
Percentage of positive critics' reviews tracked by the website Rotten Tomatoes

On review aggregator Rotten Tomatoes, 86% of 72 critics gave the season a positive review and the average of rated reviews was 7.35 out of 10. The critics consensus reads, "The Rings of Power refreshes its journey through Middle-earth, refining its focus and shifting power into the hands of its most compelling characters while solidifying its place as a worthy prequel to The Lord of the Rings." Metacritic assigned a weighted average score of 65 out of 100 based on 16 reviews, indicating a "generally favorable" response. Critics continued to highlight the series' visuals and the performances of the cast, and found the season to be more focused than the previous two. Some still criticized the pacing and the large amount of lore.

=== Accolades ===
Accolades received by the third season of The Lord of the Rings: The Rings of Power
Award	Date of ceremony	Category	Recipient(s)	Result	Ref.
Hollywood Music in Media Awards	November 18, 2026	Original Song — TV Show/Limited Series	Bear McCreary, Aurora, and J. D. Payne (for "Morning Shall Come")	Nominated	
Hollywood Music in Media Awards	November 18, 2026	Original Score — TV Show/Limited Series	Bear McCreary	Nominated	
