= Jason Smith (visual effects) =

- Occupation: Visual effects supervisor
- Years active: 1997–present

Jason Smith is an American visual effects supervisor, who graduated from BYU's Computer Science program and Hartford Art School MFA in illustration. Best known for his work on various blockbuster feature film projects such as Star Wars: Episode III – Revenge of the Sith (2005), Harry Potter and the Goblet of Fire (2005), The Avengers (2012), and The Revenant (2015).

Jason Smith was nominated at the 88th Academy Awards for his work on the film The Revenant in the category of Best visual effects. His nomination was shared with Cameron Waldbauer, Matt Shumway and Richard McBride.
