= Alloyed (The Lord of the Rings: The Rings of Power) =

- The Lord of the Rings: The Rings of Power episode
- Cover art for the episode's soundtrack album
- Episode no.: Season 1 Episode 8
- Directed by: Wayne Che Yip
- Written by: Gennifer Hutchison; J. D. Payne; Patrick McKay
- Cinematography by: Aaron Morton
- Editing by: Stefan Grube; Cheryl Potter
- Original release date: October 14, 2022
- Running time: 72 minutes

Additional cast
- Ken Blackburn as Tar-Palantir; Alex Tarrant as Valandil; Will Fletcher as Finrod; Thusitha Jayasundera as Malva; Maxine Cunliffe as Vilma; Beau Cassidy as Dilly Brandyfoot; Bridie Sisson as the Dweller; Edith Poor as the Nomad; Kali Kopae as the Ascetic

Episode chronology
← Previous "The Eye"	Next → "Elven Kings Under the Sky"
- The Lord of the Rings: The Rings of Power season 1

"Alloyed" is the eighth and final episode of the first season of the American fantasy television series The Lord of the Rings: The Rings of Power, which is based on J. R. R. Tolkien's history of Middle-earth. It was written by Gennifer Hutchison and showrunners J. D. Payne and Patrick McKay, and directed by Wayne Che Yip.

The series is set thousands of years before Tolkien's novel The Lord of the Rings (1954–55), during the Second Age of Middle-earth. This episode reveals that Halbrand (Charlie Vickers) is the Dark Lord Sauron in disguise, and that the Stranger (Daniel Weyman) is a Wizard. It also introduces the first Rings of Power, represented in composer Bear McCreary's score by the song "Where the Shadows Lie" which is sung by Fiona Apple during the end credits. Filming for the first season took place in New Zealand, and work on episodes beyond the first two began in January 2021. Production wrapped for the season in August 2021.

"Alloyed" premiered on the streaming service Amazon Prime Video on October 14, 2022. It was estimated to have high viewership and received generally positive reviews. The episode received several awards and nominations.

== Background ==
The Lord of the Rings: The Rings of Power is based on J. R. R. Tolkien's history of Middle-earth. It is set thousands of years before his novels The Hobbit (1937) and The Lord of the Rings (1954–55). While it is contractually not a continuation of Peter Jackson's The Lord of the Rings (2001–2003) and The Hobbit (2012–2014) film trilogies, it is intended to be visually consistent with them, and the first season was produced in New Zealand like Jackson's films were. J. D. Payne and Patrick McKay were hired to develop the series and serve as its showrunners, with Wayne Che Yip set to direct four episodes of the first season.

The series covers the major events of Middle-earth's Second Age. Amazon did not acquire the rights to Tolkien's main Second Age writings, so the writers identified references to the period in The Hobbit, The Lord of the Rings, and the latter's appendices, and created a story that bridges those passages. The Second Age begins after the defeat of the "Dark Lord" Morgoth, when his army of Orcs are scattered and his lieutenant Sauron is in hiding. The large cast of characters includes Elves, Dwarves, Men, and Harfoots, the last being precursors to the diminutive Hobbits from The Hobbit and The Lord of the Rings.

== Plot ==
Harfoots Nori Brandyfoot, Poppy Proudfellow, Marigold Brandyfoot, and Sadoc Burrows search for the Stranger in the Greenwood, but he is first found by the three mysterious women known as the Dweller, the Nomad, and the Ascetic. They tell him that he is their Lord Sauron, and plan to restore his memories and power.

The Elf Galadriel travels to Eregion with her gravely injured human companion Halbrand, just as Celebrimbor decides that they do not have enough mithril to prevent the fading power of the Elves. As Halbrand recovers, he grows interested in Celebrimbor's work and suggests they combine the mithril with other elements to create a small object with power over the seen and unseen worlds. High King Gil-galad is against this, but Galadriel convinces him that it is worth trying. Still, she grows suspicious of Halbrand and asks for records on his lineage.

With Númenórean King Tar-Palantir growing ill, Chancellor Pharazôn asks members of the Builders' Guild to design his tomb. Eärien is given an hour by the king's bed to plan a design, during which the king awakes and mistakes her for his daughter, Queen Regent Míriel. He leads Eärien to the palantír seeing stone and warns her not to look for too long at the visions it shows. The king dies soon afterward, before Míriel and Eärien's father Elendil return from Middle-earth.

The Harfoots attempt to rescue the Stranger from the women and Sadoc is killed. The Stranger regains some of his memories and uses the Dweller's magic staff to banish the women to the unseen world. Before they go, they realize that he is an Istar. The Stranger explains to Nori, Marigold, and Poppy that Istar means Wizard, and he needs to travel east to the land of Rhûn to learn more about his powers and purpose. Nori decides to go with him.

Halbrand and Celebrimbor plan to create two small, circular objects. Galadriel receives records on the Kings of the Southlands and realizes that Halbrand has been lying to her. She confronts him and he reveals himself to be Sauron. He asks her to rule Middle-earth at his side, but she refuses and he flees to Mordor. Galadriel keeps this secret and encourages Celebrimbor to move forward with three objects instead of two. Elrond finds the records and deduces what happened, but too late: three Rings of Power are forged.

== Production ==
=== Writing ===
"Alloyed" was written by Gennifer Hutchison, Payne, and McKay. It reveals that Halbrand is actually Sauron in disguise, and also that the Stranger is an Istar (Wizard). For the latter, dialogue references a line spoken by the Wizard Gandalf in The Lord of the Rings, but the episode does not confirm which Wizard the character is. When asked whether they wanted the revelations about Sauron and the Stranger to be surprise twists for the audience or inevitable reveals, the showrunners said they were more interested in the character dynamics than the specific reveal of who each of those characters are. They hoped audiences would re-watch the season and feel that it is clear who each character is through their interactions with other characters. Alternate scripts were written, and the real finale script was given to the actors with large sections redacted, to hide the big reveals.

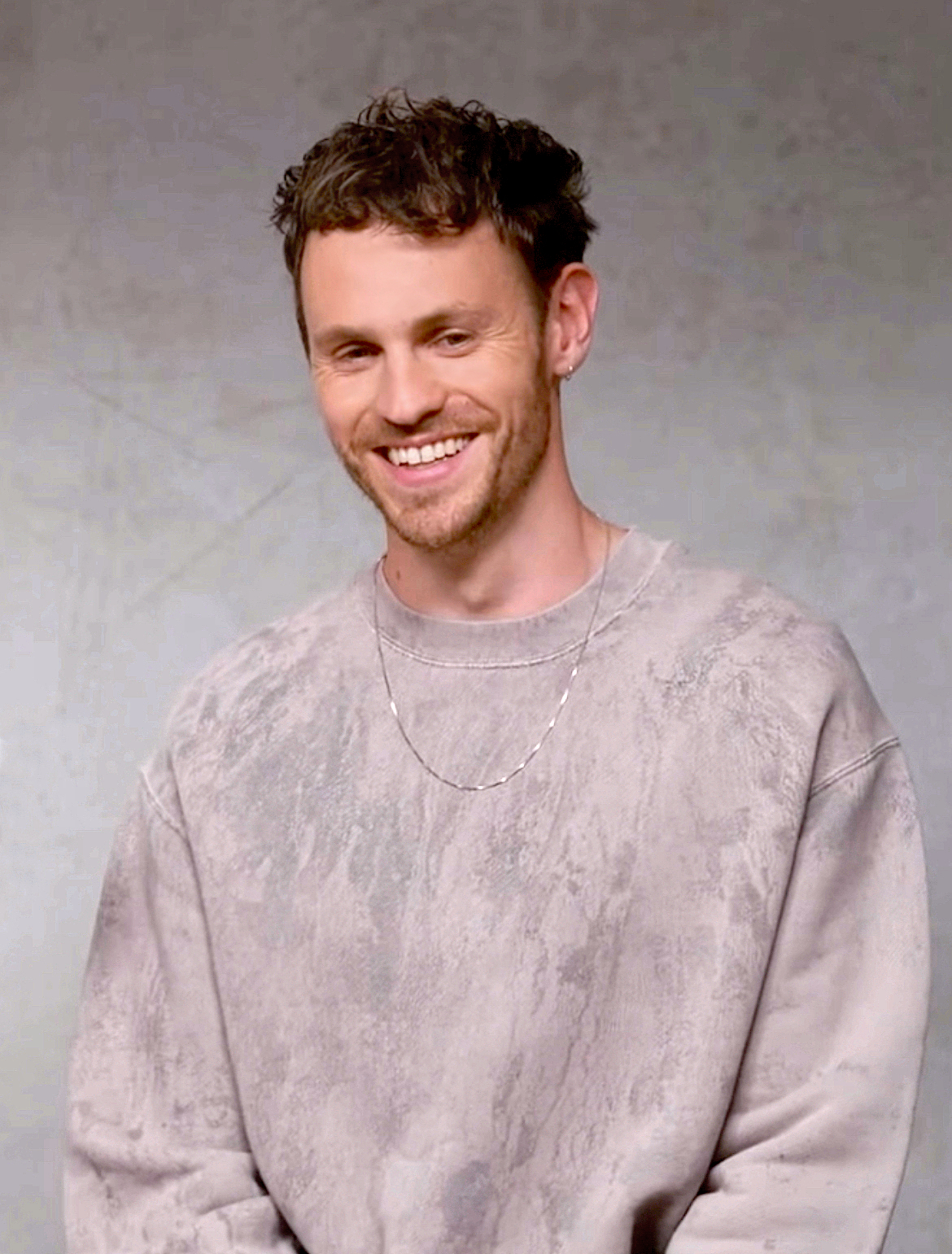
Charlie Vickers's Halbrand is revealed to be the Dark Lord Sauron in disguise during this episode.

Based on a line of dialogue from The Lord of the Rings where Galadriel says "I know [Sauron's] mind, and he gropes ever to know mine", the writers inferred that the two characters could have met before and wanted to explore that idea by having Sauron appear in disguise throughout the season. "Halbrand", the lost king of the Southlands who can unite his people against the Orcs, was designed to be the exact person that Galadriel needs to achieve her goals. Some of his dialogue is repurposed lines that Tolkien wrote for Galadriel, including "the tides of fate are flowing" which is his first line in the series. The rest of his dialoge has double meaning to be "true to a certain extent" for Sauron. In "The Great Wave", Halbrand tells Galadriel that "the way you beat your enemies is to figure out what they need and figure out how to give it to them" which is what he does to her in the season. Actor Charlie Vickers acknowledged that the one time Halbrand is alone in the season, during "Partings", he appears to be truly conflicted about going with Galadriel to Middle-earth. However, the actor considered an alternative explanation when filming that scene: the Valar could be watching and Sauron is trying to deceive them as well. The final confrontation between Galadriel and Sauron in this episode repeats more dialogue that Galadriel says in The Lord of the Rings when she is tempted by Sauron's One Ring. Sauron discusses wanting to bring order to Middle-earth, which is how Tolkien described the character's motivations during the Second Age. Vickers felt Sauron's offer to make Galadriel his queen was not a romantic proposal and came from a place of wanting to use her.

Though the Rings of Power for Elves were made after those for Men and Dwarves in Tolkien's history, the writers chose to follow the order used in the Ring Verse poem which starts with those for the Elves. They wanted the season to justify the "Faustian deal" that the Elves accept when they make the rings. Galadriel and Elrond go on separate journeys throughout the season: Elrond attempts to reverse the Elves' fading power in Middle-earth with mithril while Galadriel gathers an army to fight the forces of evil. When they both fail, they turn to the creation of the Rings of Power out of desperation. The showrunners noted that when the two characters come together in this episode, they reflect on their interactions in the premiere, "A Shadow of the Past", where Elrond encouraged Galadriel to leave Middle-earth. A piece of mithril from Elrond's storyline and metal from Galadriel's dagger—representing her brother and her hunt for Sauron—are both used in the creation of the three Elven rings. McKay said these two elements added an emotional grounding to the rings and symbolized the end of those two character arcs.

The showrunners believed the series would not feel like Middle-earth without Wizards, and wanted to have a "Tolkienian relationship" between a Wizard and a halfling similar to Gandalf and Frodo Baggins in The Lord of the Rings. One version of Tolkien's history has the two Blue Wizards arrive in Middle-earth during the Second Age, so the showrunners used that as the basis to include the Stranger. One of the central themes for the series that the showrunners set early in the writing process was the idea that being good is a choice. They noted that there is precedence for Wizards to turn to evil in Tolkien's stories and so it was a big moment for them in the finale to have the Stranger declare "I am good". This scene was inspired by the end of the film The Iron Giant (1999). The episode is the first time that the Stranger is able to speak clearly in the common tongue. Star Daniel Weyman worked with dialect coach Leith McPherson to settle on an accent for the character that felt appropriate for a powerful Maiar being, but also included "a little twinge of the Irish lilt" that the Harfoots speak with.

=== Casting ===
The season's cast includes Cynthia Addai-Robinson as Míriel, Robert Aramayo as Elrond, Morfydd Clark as Galadriel, Charles Edwards as Celebrimbor, Trystan Gravelle as Pharazôn, Lenny Henry as Sadoc Burrows, Ema Horvath as Eärien, Markella Kavenagh as Elanor "Nori" Brandyfoot, Lloyd Owen as Elendil, Megan Richards as Poppy Proudfellow, Dylan Smith as Largo Brandyfoot, Charlie Vickers as Halbrand, Leon Wadham as Kemen, Benjamin Walker as Gil-galad, Daniel Weyman as the Stranger, and Sara Zwangobani as Marigold Brandyfoot. Also starring in the episode are Ken Blackburn as Tar-Palantir, Alex Tarrant as Valandil, Will Fletcher as Finrod, Thusitha Jayasundera as Malva, Maxine Cunliffe as Vilma, Beau Cassidy as Dilly Brandyfoot, Bridie Sisson as the Dweller, Edith Poor as the Nomad, and Kali Kopae as the Ascetic.

=== Design ===
Due to the COVID-19 pandemic, the design team was unable to bring in extra help and resources from outside New Zealand once production was underway. This forced them to cut back on some plans for later episodes, including Celebrimbor's forge which production designer Ramsey Avery originally intended to be a full new set. He and his team instead repurposed an existing set that had been used for the Númenórean dungeon and Hall of Lore in earlier episodes. Avery said they did this "kind of at the last minute". He and the design team talked to real ring makers in Auckland and took lessons on how rings are created in real life. Avery noted that this is usually done by casting the ring from a mold, which is different from illustrations of how the rings are forged in Tolkien's works that tend to show someone hammering the metal into shape. The designers worked to come up with a compromise between Tolkien's descriptions and the reality of creating rings, plus the showrunners still wanted the sequence to feel magical in some ways. The triskelion-shaped prop that is used in the creation of the rings was inspired by traditional Celtic designs. There was not enough time to make the forge set and props fire-proof, so the fire seen in the sequence was either filmed separately or created by the visual effects team.

=== Filming ===
Production on episodes beyond the first two began in January 2021, under the working title Untitled Amazon Project or simply UAP, following an extended filming break that began due to the COVID-19 pandemic. Yip directed the episode, and confirmed that he had begun filming his episodes by March. Aaron Morton was the cinematographer for Yip's episodes. Clark and Vickers had many discussions about the scene where Halbrand is revealed to be Sauron, but it was not until they started filming that Clark saw Vickers's Sauron performance. Clark compared the scene to Shakespearean performance. It was filmed over three weeks, including two days for Galadriel confronting Halbrand by a stream. Around 3,000 plants were added by the greens team for those days, many of which were grown out of season. Filming for the season wrapped on August 2.

=== Visual effects ===
Visual effects for the episode were created by Industrial Light & Magic (ILM), Wētā FX, Method Studios, Rodeo FX, DNEG, Outpost VFX, Cause and FX, Atomic Arts, and Cantina Creative. The different vendors were overseen by visual effects supervisor Jason Smith. Rodeo handled much of the Harfoot storyline, including environment augmentation, scale work, and fire and magic effects. When the Stranger vanquishes the three Mystics, they briefly appear to be "skeletal, spectral figures" similar to how the Nazgûl appear in the unseen world in Jackson's Lord of the Rings films. Payne confirmed that this is how the Mystics appear in the unseen world and McKay added, "We're riffing on the visual language of that". Cause and FX contributed to various effects throughout the season, and were entrusted with the final scene in which Sauron enters Mordor. The company created a digital matte painting of the Mordor environment, added effects for the erupting Mount Doom and general atmosphere, and then combined those with the live-action elements to complete the sequence.

Outpost VFX was responsible for the forging of the rings, and looked at a lot of references for molten metal and different liquids combining. They were able to see the series' title announcement video, which features macro photography of real molten metal being poured, before it was officially released. For shots where the camera movement was motivated by the pouring of molten metal, the actors had been filmed pouring shampoo. Other shots were filmed with no reference liquid. Outpost visual effects supervisor Richard Clegg said a challenge of making digital molten metal look realistic was getting the interaction of light correct, because the metal is a light source itself but also forms a crust that other light interacts with. He also said the addition of mithril to the molten metal was difficult to make realistic due to it being a magical process. They noticed that when it is first added, the mithril forms a shape similar to the Eye of Sauron. There were discussions about how much to lean into this imagery versus keeping it subtle. The company augmented the scene with coals and flames, and adjusted the practical lighting to more correctly show the high exposure on the camera that the molten metal would create. Three artists worked on the 20-shot sequence for two months, which Clegg said was not much time for such complex work. Physical rings were made for the end of the sequence but these were enhanced with visual effects. Producer Ron Ames explained, "No ring that we could have built practically would have been special enough".

=== Music ===
==== "Where the Shadows Lie" ====
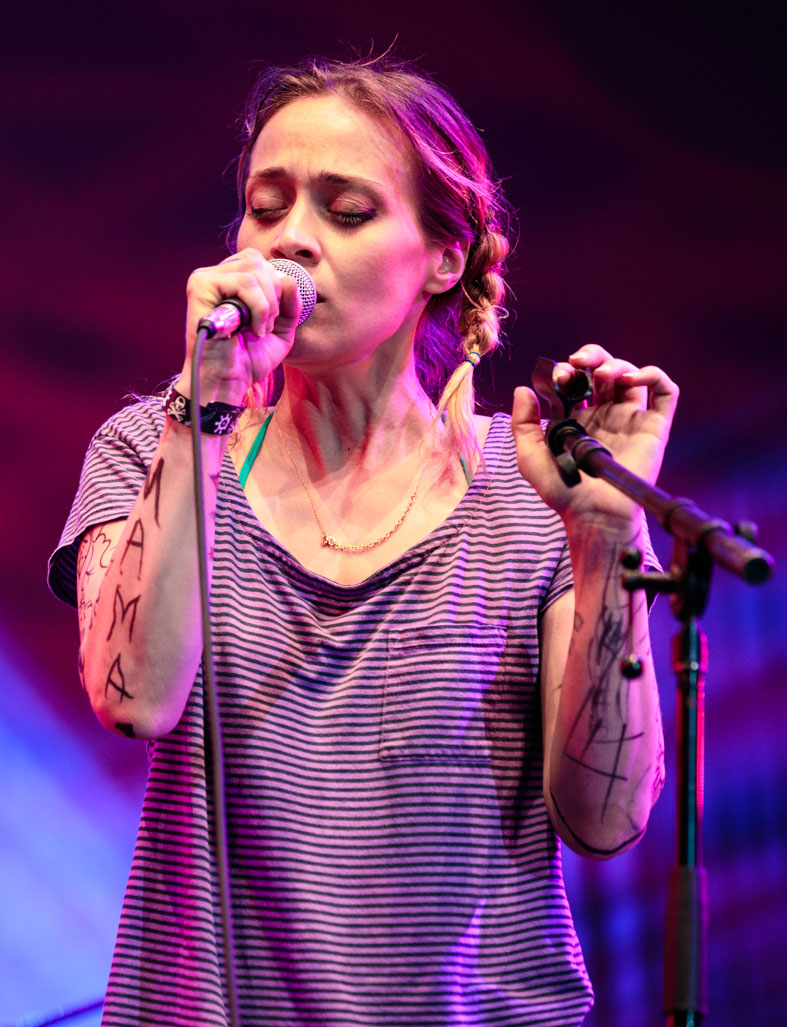
Fiona Apple sings the end credits song "Where the Shadows Lie", which is based on J. R. R. Tolkien's Ring Verse poem from The Lord of the Rings.

A theme titled "Where the Shadows Lie" was introduced during the end credits of the first episode, and composer Bear McCreary used a chord progression from it to represent Celebrimbor and mithril during the season. This episode reveals that "Where the Shadows Lie" is McCreary's theme for the Rings of Power and it is actually a song, featuring Tolkien's Ring Verse poem as lyrics:

Three Rings for the Elven-kings under the sky,
Seven for the Dwarf-lords in their halls of stone,
Nine for Mortal Men doomed to die,
One for the Dark Lord on his dark throne
In the Land of Mordor where the Shadows lie.
One Ring to rule them all, One Ring to find them,
One Ring to bring them all, and in the darkness bind them
In the Land of Mordor where the Shadows lie.

McCreary wanted to compose a similar song to those heard during the credits of Jackson's films, and settled on the idea of creating a "haunting melody" for the Ring Verse poem that could be used during the finale's end credits. He described this as a "side project" that he kept secret from the showrunners for months. They and Amazon were enthusiastic about the song after hearing a demo, featuring McCreary's wife and frequent collaborator Raya Yarbrough, and they wanted to get a "world-class artist" to sing the final version. McCreary and the showrunners said they were longtime fans of Fiona Apple, who was hired to sing the song, and praised her performance. McCreary felt she "brought new depths and narrative intention to the song". Apple's version of "Where the Shadows Lie" was announced on October 7, 2022, when it was added to the digital version of the previously released soundtrack album for the first season by Amazon Music.

==== Episode score ====
McCreary began work on the series in July 2021, and started by composing the main themes for the series. He wrote an "anthem" for each culture and then created individual character themes that relate to their culture's music in different ways. McCreary asked the showrunners to tell him Sauron's true identity so he could plan the music accordingly. They allowed him to read the finale's script early and he was able to compose the themes for Sauron and Halbrand with the reveal in mind. McCreary wrote Halbrand's theme so playing it backwards or inverting the musical notes would turn it into Sauron's theme. To hide the connection, the two themes are not heard together until this episode. McCreary also asked the showrunners whether the Stranger would turn out to be a hero or a villain, which allowed him to make that character's theme more ominous at the beginning of the season before becoming more heroic in this episode. Additionally, the episode introduces a "swirling" string ostinato which McCreary called the "Forging Theme". It can be heard in scenes related to forging the rings.

The Lord of the Rings: The Rings of Power (Season One, Episode Eight: Alloyed – Amazon Original Series Soundtrack)

Film score by Bear McCreary
- Released: October 14, 2022
- Genres: Orchestra; choir; world
- Length: 59:46
- Languages: English; Constructed languages
- Labels: Amazon; Mondo

Bear McCreary chronology
The Eye (2022)	Alloyed (2022)	The Serpent Queen (2022)

A soundtrack album featuring McCreary's score was released digitally on October 14, 2022, containing "virtually every second of score" from the episode. A CD featuring the episode's music is included in a limited edition box set collection for the season from Mondo, Amazon Music, and McCreary's label Sparks & Shadows. The box set was released on April 26, 2024, and includes a journal written by McCreary which details the creation of the episode's score. All music was composed by Bear McCreary:

Track listing
No.	Title	Length
1.	"Encountering Servants"	2:29
2.	"An Intriguing Suggestion"	8:44
3.	"Power Over Flesh"	7:44
4.	"Confronting the Mystics"	11:12
5.	"Black Flags"	3:30
6.	"The Broken Line and Broken Silence"	11:31
7.	"Wise One"	8:45
8.	"True Creation Requires Sacrifice"	5:51
Total length:		59:46

== Release ==
"Alloyed" premiered on the streaming service Amazon Prime Video on October 14, 2022. It was released at the same time around the world, in more than 240 countries and territories. For two weeks leading up to the second season's premiere on August 29, 2024, the first season was made available for free on the streaming service Samsung TV Plus in the US, Canada, Brazil, the United Kingdom, and Germany.

Ahead of the third season's release in November 2026, a home media release for the first two seasons was announced. Each release features the eight episodes of the respective season along with behind-the-scenes content. They were released on 4K Ultra HD, Blu-ray, and DVD on November 3, and in limited edition 4K UHD SteelBook—with Amazon exclusive collectable art cards—on December 1.

== Reception ==
=== Viewership ===
Whip Media, which tracks viewership data for the 21 million worldwide users of its TV Time app, calculated that for the week ending October 16, two days after the episode's debut, The Rings of Power remained the second-highest original streaming series for US viewership, behind Disney+'s She-Hulk: Attorney at Law. JustWatch, a guide to streaming content with access to data from more than 20 million users around the world, placed the series third on its list of top 10 streaming series in the US for the week ending October 16. Nielsen Media Research, which records streaming viewership on US television screens, estimated that the series was watched for 1.1 billion minutes during the week ending October 16. This was an increase with the finale's release, moving the series up to second-place on the company's list of top streaming series and films, behind only Netflix's The Watcher. Parrot Analytics determines audience "demand expressions" based on various data sources, including social media activity and comments on rating platforms. During the week ending October 21, the company calculated that The Rings of Power was 43.4 times more in demand than the average US streaming series, a 10 percent increase that moved it up to second on the company's top 10 list for the week.

=== Critical response ===
On review aggregator Rotten Tomatoes, 85% of 26 critics gave the episode a positive review and the average of rated reviews was 8 out of 10. The critics consensus reads, "The Rings of Power's central mystery is finally answered in 'Alloyed', a finale that is by turns sumptuous and staid while hinting at a more propulsive story to come."

=== Accolades ===
Accolades received by the The Lord of the Rings: The Rings of Power episode "Alloyed"
Award	Date of ceremony	Category	Recipient(s)	Result	Ref.
Golden Reel Awards	February 26, 2023	Outstanding Achievement in Music Editing – Broadcast Long Form	Jason Smith and Michael Baber	Nominated	
Golden Trailer Awards	June 29, 2023	Best BTS/EPK for a TV/Streaming Series (Over 2 minutes)	SunnyBoy Entertainment (for Behind the Scenes of "Alloyed")	Nominated	
Movieguide Awards	February 26, 2023	Best Mature Audience Television	"Alloyed"	Won	
Movieguide Awards	February 26, 2023	Epiphany Prize Television	"Alloyed"	Nominated	
Movieguide Awards	February 26, 2023	Faith & Freedom Award Television	"Alloyed"	Nominated	

== Companion media ==
An episode of the official aftershow Deadline's Inside the Ring: LOTR: The Rings of Power for "Alloyed" was released on October 15, 2022. Hosted by Deadline Hollywood's Dominic Patten and Anthony D'Alessandro, it features exclusive "footage and insights" for the episode, plus interviews with Vickers, Payne, McKay, executive producer Lindsey Weber, Yip, and McCreary. On October 14, The Official The Lord of the Rings: The Rings of Power Podcast was released on Amazon Music. Hosted by actress Felicia Day, the eighth episode is dedicated to "Alloyed" and features Payne and McKay. On November 21, a bonus segment featuring behind-the-scenes footage from the episode was added to Prime Video's X-Ray feature as part of a series titled "The Making of The Rings of Power".
