= The Eye (The Lord of the Rings: The Rings of Power) =

- The Lord of the Rings: The Rings of Power episode
- Cover art for the episode's soundtrack album
- Episode no.: Season 1 Episode 7
- Directed by: Charlotte Brändström
- Written by: Jason Cahill
- Cinematography by: Alex Disenhof
- Editing by: Jochen FitzHerbert
- Original release date: October 7, 2022
- Running time: 72 minutes

Additional cast
- Alex Tarrant as Valandil; Anthony Crum as Ontamo; Beau Cassidy as Dilly Brandyfoot; Thusitha Jayasundera as Malva; Maxine Cunliffe as Vilma; Peter Mullan as Durin III; Joseph Mawle as Adar; Geoff Morrell as Waldreg; Edith Poor as the Nomad; Kali Kopae as the Ascetic; Bridie Sisson as the Dweller

Episode chronology
← Previous "Udûn"	Next → "Alloyed"
- The Lord of the Rings: The Rings of Power season 1

"The Eye" is the seventh episode of the first season of the American fantasy television series The Lord of the Rings: The Rings of Power, which is based on J. R. R. Tolkien's history of Middle-earth. It was written by Jason Cahill and directed by Charlotte Brändström.

The series is set thousands of years before Tolkien's novel The Lord of the Rings (1954–55), during the Second Age of Middle-earth. Filming for the first season took place in New Zealand, and work on episodes beyond the first two began in January 2021. Production wrapped for the season in August 2021. This episode explores the aftermath of the volcanic eruption from the end of the previous episode, "Udûn", and shows characters facing the consequences of their actions. The look of the post-eruption setting was designed by cinematographer Alex Disenhof based on reference pictures from wildfires, including some he took of the 2020 Oregon wildfires.

"The Eye" premiered on the streaming service Amazon Prime Video on October 7, 2022. It was estimated to have high viewership and received generally positive reviews, with praise for the visuals and the focus on characters and consequences, but criticism for the ending scenes which show a Balrog and a "Mordor" title card.

== Background ==
The Lord of the Rings: The Rings of Power is based on J. R. R. Tolkien's history of Middle-earth. It is set thousands of years before his novels The Hobbit (1937) and The Lord of the Rings (1954–55). While it is contractually not a continuation of Peter Jackson's The Lord of the Rings (2001–2003) and The Hobbit (2012–2014) film trilogies, it is intended to be visually consistent with them, and the first season was produced in New Zealand like Jackson's films were. J. D. Payne and Patrick McKay were hired to develop the series and serve as its showrunners, with Charlotte Brändström set to direct two episodes of the first season.

The series covers the major events of Middle-earth's Second Age. Amazon did not acquire the rights to Tolkien's main Second Age writings, so the writers identified references to the period in The Hobbit, The Lord of the Rings, and the latter's appendices, and created a story that bridges those passages. The Second Age begins after the defeat of the "Dark Lord" Morgoth, when his army of Orcs are scattered and his lieutenant Sauron is in hiding. The large cast of characters includes Elves, Dwarves, Men, and Harfoots, the last being precursors to the diminutive Hobbits from The Hobbit and The Lord of the Rings.

== Plot ==
Following the eruption of Orodruin, the village of Tirharad is covered in ash and fire. The Elf Galadriel finds the young human Theo and they bond over their shared guilt regarding the events leading to the eruption. Galadriel discusses her husband Celeborn, whom she believes to be dead. Númenórean soldiers Isildur and Valandil find their friend Ontamo dead. They help Queen Regent Míriel rescue survivors from a burning building, but it collapses. Míriel loses her eyesight and Isildur is presumed dead.

The Harfoots finish their migration to the Grove, an orchard that has been destroyed by the nearby volcano. They ask the Stranger to fix it with his magic, but his attempts lead to a large tree branch landing on young Harfoots Nori and Dilly Brandyfoot. Scared, the Harfoots send him away. The next day they awake to find the orchard regrown. When three mysterious women arrive in search of the Stranger, Nori attempts to send them in the wrong direction. They retaliate by using magic to burn the Harfoot wagons. Nori leaves to find the Stranger and warn him of the danger, accompanied by her friend Poppy Proudfellow, her mother Marigold, and Harfoot elder Sadoc Burrows.

Galadriel and Theo reach a Númenórean camp outside of the Southlands where Theo is reunited with his mother Bronwyn and the Elf Arondir. Isildur's father Elendil learns of his loss and lets Isildur's horse, who cannot be calmed, gallop away. Before the Númenóreans depart Middle-earth, Míriel promises to return for vengeance. Galadriel is reunited with her gravely wounded human companion Halbrand and helps him ride north to receive Elvish medicine. The other human survivors seek refuge in nearby Pelargir, an old Númenórean colony.

In the Dwarven realm of Khazad-dûm, Prince Durin IV and his Elf friend Elrond are denied permission to mine the powerful ore mithril by King Durin III. When they see proof that mithril can reverse the fading power of the Elves, the pair begin mining it in secret. They are caught by Durin III and Elrond is banished, taking a small piece of mithril with him. Durin IV is stripped of his royal status and Durin III orders the mithril mine be sealed. Deep below it, a Balrog secretly lives. The Orcs and their human allies proclaim their leader, Adar, "Lord of the Southlands". He says that place no longer exists: it is now the land of Mordor.

== Production ==
=== Writing ===
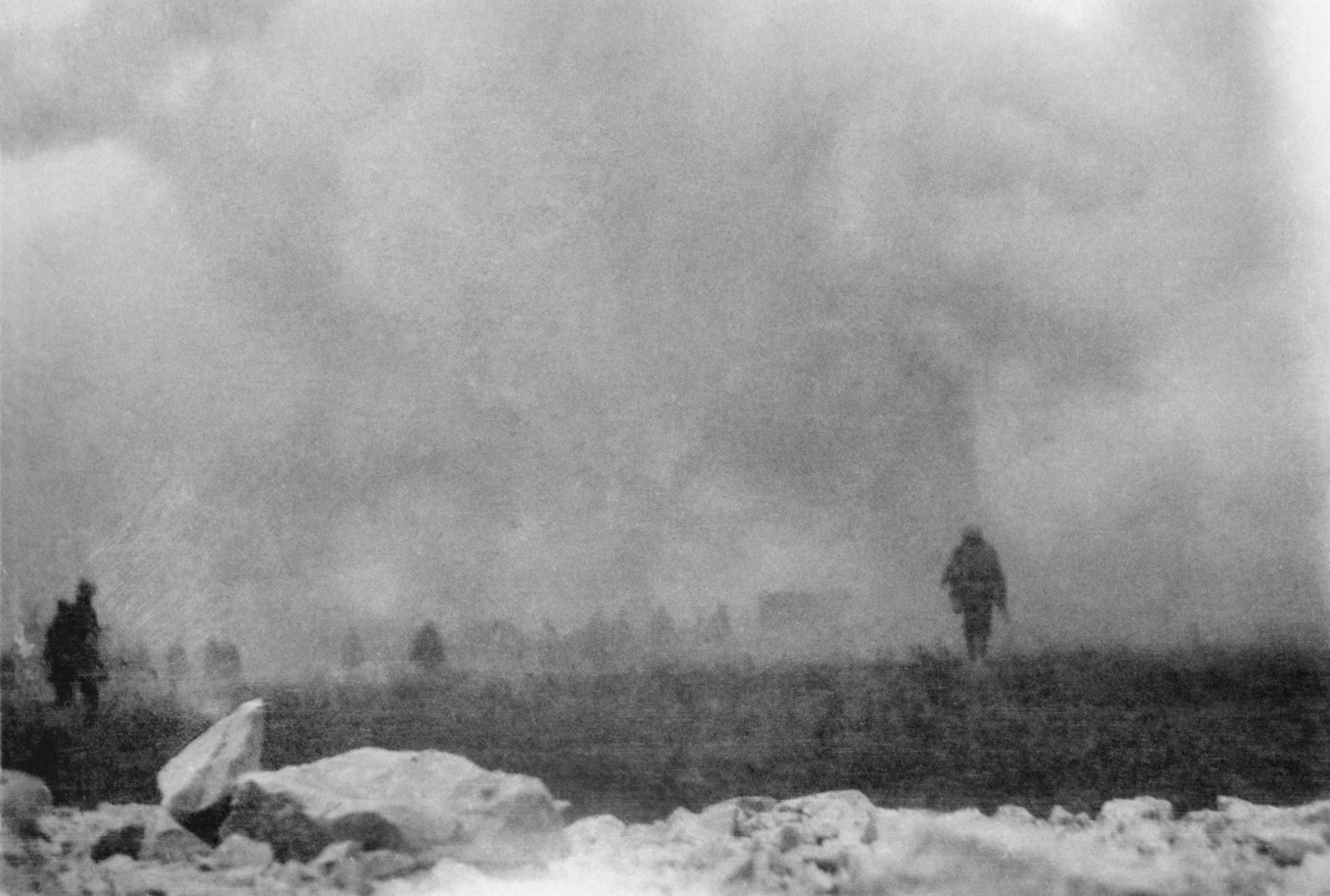
Chemical weapons used during World War I inspired the decision to have Míriel lose her sight in the episode. Pictured are British soldiers advancing into a chemical gas cloud during the Battle of Loos in 1915.

"The Eye" was written by Jason Cahill. Brändström said it was an opportunity to slow down and focus on the characters following the action-heavy episode "Udûn". The showrunners said it was about characters facing the consequences of their actions. After taking inspiration from World War I for the Orc tunnels earlier in the season, the writers noticed a parallel between the smoke, ash, and fire of this episode's post-eruption setting and chemical weapons used in that war. This led to a suggestion that a character should be blinded, and multiple writers simultaneously suggested that it should be Míriel. They thought it was a tragic irony that the person who has been having visions of the future of Númenor now cannot see at all. A line of dialogue was added to the fifth episode, "Partings", to foreshadow this development, when Míriel's father tells her that darkness awaits her in Middle-earth.

The showrunners said the episode would bring together unlikely character pairings among the survivors of the eruption, including Galadriel and Theo. Galadriel actress Morfydd Clark said the episode was the first glimpse in the series of who her character would have been if she was not hunting for Sauron, and said there is an element of the character feeling at peace despite her overall feelings of "shame and devastation". When Galadriel tells Theo not to take on the burden of guilt, Brändström felt Galadriel is seeing herself in him and is really giving that advice to herself. The director added that Theo is awestruck of Galadriel when he sees her fighting in the sixth episode, and the fact that she gives him advice and her sword in this episode makes him want to be a good person and live up to her example. The episode includes the series' first mention of Galadriel's husband Celeborn when she tells Theo that she believes him to be dead. This is a change from Tolkien's history, where the two are not separated in this way. The showrunners liked the idea that people sometimes talk about things to a new friend or stranger that they are not willing to discuss with their closest friends, and McKay added, "Maybe Theo's confessions are provoking confessions from her." The change from Tolkien's history was made because the showrunners were approaching the series as a "long-term creative project" with plans to introduce different Tolkien characters each season. They also wanted to explore Galadriel as an individual and in terms of her relationship to Halbrand before introducing Celeborn to the story. The showrunners thought fans would be excited to meet Celeborn in an unexpected way and build towards the relationship that he has with Galadriel in the Third Age. They were surprised when some Tolkien fans took issue with the change to established lore.

In the climactic scene between Prince Durin IV and his father King Durin III, the latter opens up about the former's difficult birth. When Prince Durin says Elrond is like a brother to him, an outraged King Durin rips a collar from his son's neck and tells him to leave it on the ground. Durin IV actor Owain Arthur explained that this act signifies that Durin IV has been disowned by the king, and said it is "quite a big, vulnerable moment for Prince Durin to be left alone in the lurch and not knowing what's around the corner". The episode reveals that Durin IV has a different name which distinguishes him from his father, a name that is only known to his Dwarven family. This name was originally going to be revealed, but the moment was cut during the editing process. Payne revealed that the name sounds something like "Kheled-Tug", but McKay stopped him from discussing it further.

=== Casting ===
The season's cast includes Cynthia Addai-Robinson as Míriel, Robert Aramayo as Elrond, Owain Arthur as Durin IV, Maxim Baldry as Isildur, Nazanin Boniadi as Bronwyn, Morfydd Clark as Galadriel, Ismael Cruz Córdova as Arondir, Lenny Henry as Sadoc Burrows, Markella Kavenagh as Elanor "Nori" Brandyfoot, Tyroe Muhafidin as Theo, Sophia Nomvete as Disa, Lloyd Owen as Elendil, Megan Richards as Poppy Proudfellow, Dylan Smith as Largo Brandyfoot, Charlie Vickers as Halbrand, Daniel Weyman as the Stranger, and Sara Zwangobani as Marigold Brandyfoot. Also starring in the episode are Alex Tarrant as Valandil, Anthony Crum as Ontamo, Beau Cassidy as Dilly Brandyfoot, Thusitha Jayasundera as Malva, Maxine Cunliffe as Vilma, Peter Mullan as Durin III, Joseph Mawle as Adar, Geoff Morrell as Waldreg, Edith Poor as the Nomad, Kali Kopae as the Ascetic, and Bridie Sisson as the Dweller. Jed Brophy and Robert Strange play unnamed Orcs in the episode.

=== Filming and design ===
Production on episodes beyond the first two began in January 2021, under the working title Untitled Amazon Project or simply UAP, following an extended filming break that began due to the COVID-19 pandemic. Brändström first began discussing plans for the sixth and seventh episodes while she was in COVID-19 quarantine on her way into New Zealand. Virtual production allowed Brändström and cinematographer Alex Disenhof to plan the two episodes within a digital environment. They had two months of pre-production before filming started. Brändström and Disenhof were inspired more by production designer Ramsey Avery's sets and artwork than what the other directors and cinematographers had done so far, believing they could bring a fresh perspective to the series because of their episodes' unique story elements and greater focus on location shooting. Brändström felt the episodes were more like one long film, with the sixth episode being the set-up for dramatic payoffs in the seventh. They chose to play into this by focusing on Galadriel's perspective at the end of the sixth episode and again at the start of the seventh. Brändström was confirmed to be in New Zealand for production in May 2021, and her episodes were filmed across 80 first unit shooting days and 30 second unit shooting days. The first two days were on location at Mount Kidd in the South Island, for the scene where Galadriel meets with a wounded Míriel. They only had one day to prepare on location due to how remote it is, but had been able to plan ahead with virtual production. The Númenórean encampment was built near Auckland, with visual effects used to place it at Mount Kidd. Filming for the season wrapped on August 2.

Concept art for the episode's Khazad-dûm scenes reminded Disenhof of Baroque paintings and inspired him to use practical, single-source lighting on those sets where possible. Putting lanterns close to the actors achieved the look that he wanted, but this made the lanterns blow-out on camera. The visual effects team restored some of the lantern details for these shots. For the scene where Disa and Durin discuss mithril and their future as rulers, Brändström wanted to focus on Disa's ambitions and the aspects of her character that are comparable to Lady Macbeth from William Shakespeare's play Macbeth. Because the Harfoots are supposed to be much smaller than the orchard that they arrive at in the episode, the production portrayed apple trees using pear trees with large, artificial apples added to them. When the Harfoots first arrive at the orchard and see it has been destroyed by the volcano, Brändström chose to focus on their reactions first before revealing the damage to the audience. This was a way to keep the focus on the character's feelings.

==== Post-eruption setting ====
The episode begins in a post-volcanic eruption version of the series' village set that was built in a studio (top). Cinematographer Alex Disenhof used a specific lighting set-up (bottom) to match reference images he took of real wildfires. Some visual effects were used to complete these scenes.

Disenhof took pictures during the 2020 Oregon wildfires which inspired the combination of red, orange, and yellow colors that he wanted to replicate for the episode's post-eruption scenes. He also compiled reference images from the 2018 California wildfires. He planned with Avery and Brändström to show a progression of color throughout the episode as the characters make their way from the village to the top of the mountain. In the village the main color is red, but this moves to orange and then yellow as the characters get further out, and completely clears once they reach the top of the mountain. To achieve the initial look, a destroyed version of the village was built in Kelly Park Film Studios, a former equestrian center where they could dig into the dirt floor, based on the full village set that had been built on a farm outside of Auckland. The new set was dressed with a layer of artificial ash, which was made from the same style of paper that artificial snow is made from for film productions. Disenhof surrounded the set with muslin fabric which, combined with practical smoke, created a hazy background to hide the studio's walls. Avery added "impressionistic shapes of buildings" on the outside of the set that looked like more village buildings when filmed with the correct on-set atmosphere and camera perspective. Arri SkyPanels, LED screens used to simulate outdoor lighting, were put on the ceiling and Disenhof spent several weeks testing different lighting designs to achieve his desired look. The red color was achieved completely in camera. Visual effects were used to add embers and falling ash.

A week or two was spent filming the episode's village scenes. The first shot of the episode is a close-up of Galadriel's eye opening, covered in ash. Clark was covered in the artificial ash while her eyes were closed and then had to open her eye for the shot. Disenhof wanted a circular reflection in her eye to avoid the look of film lighting, which he achieved with a white circle of cardboard that light was reflected off. The second shot starts upside down on her hand and rotates as it pulls back to reveal her body. Disenhof did this to create a feeling of disorientation and show that "her world has been turned upside down". The first shots were filmed at 38 or 46 frames per second to create a more ethereal feeling. Brändström combined this with muffled sound design, similar to what might be used for the aftermath of an explosion. A real explosion was used for the building that collapses on Isildur. Avery felt there was a beauty to the post-eruption land that aligned with the fact that Adar had used the volcano to create a home for the Orcs. The episode's final shot, which reveals a "Mordor" title card, was filmed with a crane. Brändström started the shot by focusing on Adar's perspective and his satisfaction with having created a home for his "children".

Once the characters leave the village, filming took place on location and Disenhof was unable to control the lighting as he did on set. Instead, he achieved his desired color palette for each scene using filters on the cameras and color correction in post-production. He was able to test this on set while they were filming. Different levels of Tobacco-colored filters were used for these scenes, the only time lens filters were used in the season. The atmosphere was augmented with visual effects after on-set attempts to do this were impacted by wind. For scenes after Míriel is blinded, Brändström used her experience working with a blind actor on a previous project. When Brändström was guiding that actor around set, he asked to put his hand on her to feel like he was taking control rather than have Brändström put her hand on him and move him around. This inspired Brändström to direct Addai-Robinson to be more stoic and to take control of her new situation. They filmed a version of the scene where Míriel realizes that she is blind in which she cries, but Brändström felt this was melodramatic and did not want the character to come across as feeling sorry for herself.

=== Visual effects ===
Visual effects for the episode were created by Industrial Light & Magic (ILM), Wētā FX, Method Studios, Rodeo FX, Cause and FX, Atomic Arts, and Cantina Creative. The different vendors were overseen by visual effects supervisor Jason Smith. Rodeo handled much of the Harfoot storyline, including environment augmentation, scale work, and fire and magic effects. Brandstrom storyboarded the Balrog sequence for the visual effects team to follow. Wētā created the Balrog, which was redesigned from the version that is seen in Jackson's films as part of the "Song of the Roots of Hithaeglir" sequence in the fifth episode.

=== Music ===
Composer Bear McCreary expected the episode to be easier to score than the previous one, joking that he felt composing for the sixth episode's large amount of action scenes nearly killed him, but he said the seventh episode was still difficult due to the nuance required in combining his existing main themes in new ways. For example, this is the first episode where he used the theme for Elendil and his family to score tragic scenes. This can be heard when Elendil gains hope that Isildur is alive only to realize that he is seeing someone else, which is a scene that made McCreary cry. He hoped his music for it could convey the same emotions.

McCreary used his Orc theme to represent the post-eruption setting, but still retained his Southlands theme for key moments to show that the people of the Southlands are not completely defeated. His Southlands theme also represents Halbrand, which he thought worked out particularly well for the end of the episode where the Southlanders cheer on Halbrand. When Theo arrives in the infirmary and believes that his mother is dead, McCreary used a choral line from Raya Yarbrough—his wife and frequent collaborator—just as he did for key Bronwyn scenes in the previous episode. He hoped the audience would remember those moments and believe this to be confirmation of her death before she is revealed to be alive. The Mordor title card is accompanied by Sauron's theme with the choir singing "Mordor, where the shadows lie" in Black Speech, one of Tolkien's constructed languages.

The Lord of the Rings: The Rings of Power (Season One, Episode Seven: The Eye – Amazon Original Series Soundtrack)

Film score by Bear McCreary
- Released: October 6, 2022
- Genres: Orchestra; choir; world
- Length: 54:57
- Languages: English; Constructed languages
- Labels: Amazon; Mondo

Bear McCreary chronology
Udûn (2022)	The Eye (2022)	Alloyed (2022)

A soundtrack album featuring McCreary's score for the episode was released digitally on the streaming service Amazon Music on October 6, 2022. McCreary said the album contained "virtually every second of score" from the episode. It was added to other music streaming services after the full first season was released. A CD featuring the episode's music is included in a limited edition box set collection for the season from Mondo, Amazon Music, and McCreary's label Sparks & Shadows. The box set was released on April 26, 2024, and includes a journal written by McCreary which details the creation of the episode's score. All music was composed by Bear McCreary:

Track listing
No.	Title	Length
1.	"Crimson Aftermath"	3:03
2.	"The Grove"	3:44
3.	"Fire and Rock"	6:31
4.	"Only Grey"	4:51
5.	"The Apple"	4:12
6.	"Memories of Dancing"	3:48
7.	"The Vein"	7:50
8.	"The Extinguished Torch"	4:32
9.	"Infirmary"	6:33
10.	"A Leaf Burns"	9:53
Total length:		54:57

== Release ==
"The Eye" premiered on the streaming service Amazon Prime Video on October 7, 2022. It was released at the same time around the world, in more than 240 countries and territories. For two weeks leading up to the second season's premiere on August 29, 2024, the first season was made available for free on the streaming service Samsung TV Plus in the US, Canada, Brazil, the United Kingdom, and Germany.

Ahead of the third season's release in November 2026, a home media release for the first two seasons was announced. Each release features the eight episodes of the respective season along with behind-the-scenes content. They were released on 4K Ultra HD, Blu-ray, and DVD on November 3, and in limited edition 4K UHD SteelBook—with Amazon exclusive collectable art cards—on December 1.

== Reception ==
=== Viewership ===
Whip Media, which tracks viewership data for the 21 million worldwide users of its TV Time app, calculated that for the week ending October 9, two days after the episode's debut, The Rings of Power remained the second-highest original streaming series for US viewership, behind Disney+'s She-Hulk: Attorney at Law. Nielsen Media Research, which records streaming viewership on US television screens, estimated that the series was watched for 988 million minutes during the week ending October 9. This kept the series in third-place on the company's list of top streaming series and films, behind only Netflix's Dahmer – Monster: The Jeffrey Dahmer Story and Disney+'s Hocus Pocus 2. Parrot Analytics determines audience "demand expressions" based on various data sources, including social media activity and comments on rating platforms. During the week ending October 14, the company calculated that The Rings of Power was 38.7 times more in demand than the average US streaming series, a 25 percent increase that moved it up to third on the company's top 10 list for the week.

=== Critical response ===
On review aggregator Rotten Tomatoes, 83% of 23 critics gave the episode a positive review and the average of rated reviews was 7.6 out of 10. The critics consensus reads, "'The Eye' blinks when it comes to fully capitalizing on the momentum that its predecessor's volcanic climax promised, but it succeeds admirably in dovetailing plotlines and teeing up a cohesive finale."

Matt Schimkowitz at The A. V. Club graded the episode "A-" and said it was the best of the season so far, believing the themes explored and the style of dialogue were true to Tolkien's writings and what the franchise is really about, rather than the action and spectacle of the previous episode. Total Film's Jack Shepherd said "The Eye" was another brilliant episode after "Udûn", successfully moving the story forward by dealing with the aftermath of that episode and going deeper into the characters. He scored it four-and-a-half stars out of five. Leon Miller of Polygon also thought it was sensible to have an episode with less action that explores the consequences of the characters' choices. He felt the episode brought clarity for where the story was going moving forward, and said changes from Tolkien's lore were taking the series from an "unsure adaptation to a confident story in its own right". Tom Power at TechRadar gave the episode four stars out of five and said it was as dramatically tense, if not more so, than the previous episode despite not being as narratively focused or action-packed.

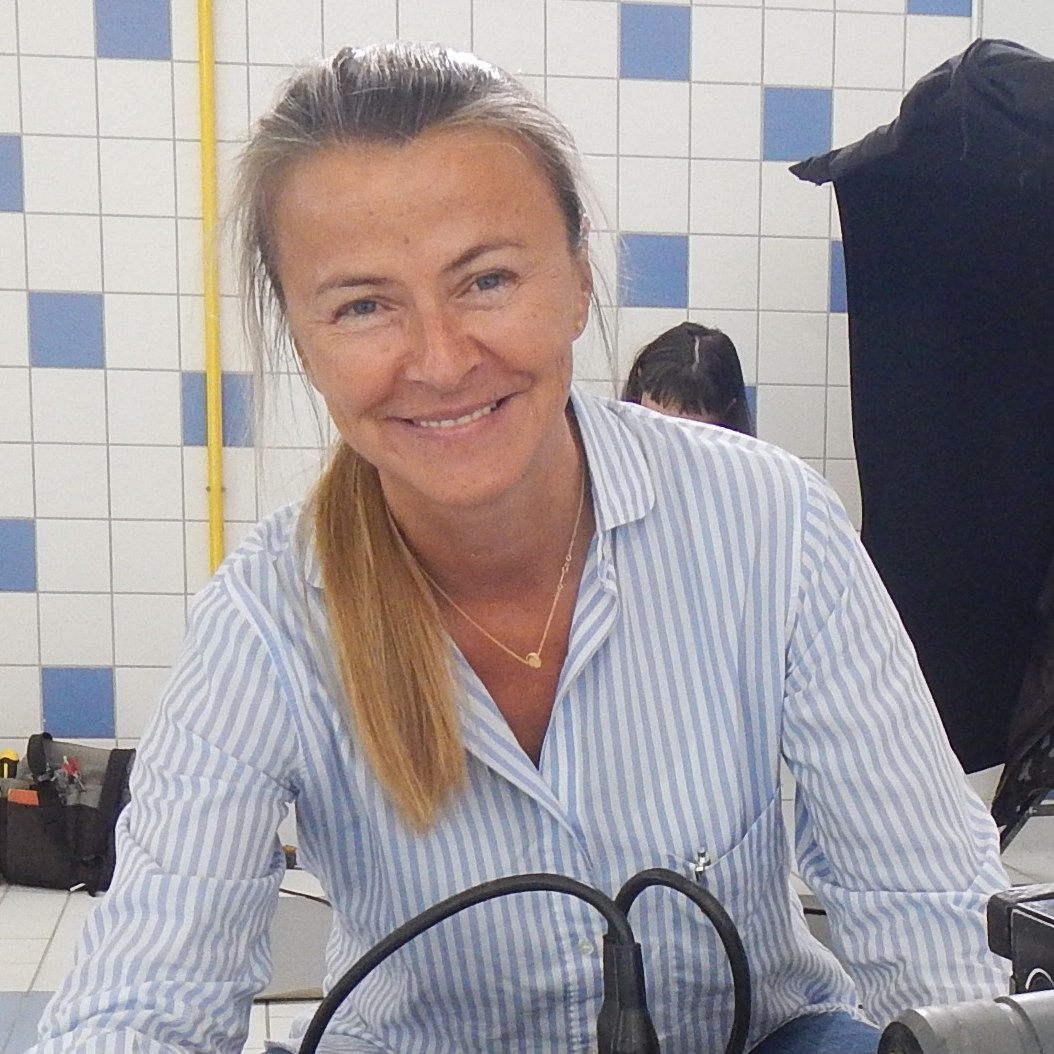
The episode received praise for Charlotte Brändström's direction and the visuals of the post-eruption setting.

Michael Nordine at Variety said the series had always been "visually arresting... but never has that beauty been as haunting" as in this episode's post-eruption setting. Power praised Brändström's direction, particularly for the opening sequence, as did Keith Phipps in his review for Vulture in which he gave the episode four stars out of five. Schimkowitz said the episode was "visually striking". Writing for The Escapist, Darren Mooney compared the episode's depiction of a post-eruption setting to the atomic bombings of Hiroshima and Nagasaki and discussed the relevance of such comparisons to Tolkien's history and writings. A scene where Galadriel and Theo hide from Orcs under a tree was compared to a similar moment when the Hobbits in The Lord of the Rings hide from a Nazgûl. Disenhof said that scene from the films was not a conscious reference for himself and Brändström.

Schimkowitz praised the performances of Aramayo and Arthur, while Power described Arthur as an "emotional powerhouse" in the episode. Phipps said the scenes with Elrond, Durin, and Disa showed how The Rings of Power was able to take meaningful breaks from action to develop its characters and relationships. Christian Holub, who graded the episode "B-" for Entertainment Weekly, thought this storyline would be stronger if the series had been more clear on the plight of the Elves and why they need mithril. He was also confused about how the series was handling Celeborn, while other reviewers felt it was clear that he would be introduced in a later season. Multiple reviewers noted the surprising pairing of Galadriel and Theo, and the episode's unified focus on themes of responsibility and consequences. Den of Geek's Juliette Harrisson said the episode was the "dark night of the soul" for the main characters and gave it three-and-a-half stars out of five. She thought some of the emotion was undermined by the audience knowing the fates of key characters, such as Isildur.

Writing for IGN, Samantha Nelson scored the episode 7 out of 10 and said it was good but did not reach the heights of the previous episode. She criticized the final two scenes, feeling the Balrog moment was unnecessary and the Mordor title card reveal was clumsy and out of character for the series. Other reviewers also criticized these two moments, including Holub who felt both were too on the nose. James Whitbrook at Gizmodo said the Balrog scene was "egregious", and questioned the title card reveal considering the whole episode was already exploring the ramifications of the Southlands being turned into Mordor. Phipps thought the title card reveal worked, but still described it as cheesy and jarring since the series had not used onscreen titles before. Harrison was more positive about the Balrog moment, calling it a "chilling image" and the series' best use of nostalgia for Jackson's films. She wished the episode ended with that image rather than the title card reveal, agreeing that it was unnecessary.

== Companion media ==
An episode of the official aftershow Deadline's Inside the Ring: LOTR: The Rings of Power for "The Eye" was released on October 8, 2022. Hosted by Deadline Hollywood's Dominic Patten and Anthony D'Alessandro, it features exclusive "footage and insights" for the episode, plus interviews with cast members Aramayo, Arthur, Addai-Robinson, Clark, Vickers, Muhafidin, Baldry, and Gravelle as well as Brändström and McCreary. On October 14, The Official The Lord of the Rings: The Rings of Power Podcast was released on Amazon Music. Hosted by actress Felicia Day, the seventh episode is dedicated to "The Eye" and features Brändström, Payne, and McKay. On November 21, a bonus segment featuring behind-the-scenes footage from the episode was added to Prime Video's X-Ray feature as part of a series titled "The Making of The Rings of Power".
