= Udûn (The Lord of the Rings: The Rings of Power) =

- The Lord of the Rings: The Rings of Power episode
- Cover art for the episode's soundtrack album
- Episode no.: Season 1 Episode 6
- Directed by: Charlotte Brändström
- Written by: Nicholas Adams; Justin Doble; J. D. Payne; Patrick McKay
- Cinematography by: Alex Disenhof
- Editing by: Jochen FitzHerbert
- Original release date: September 30, 2022
- Running time: 69 minutes

Additional cast
- Joseph Mawle as Adar; Geoff Morrell as Waldreg; Peter Tait as Tredwill; Anthony Crum as Ontamo; Alex Tarrant as Valandil; Phil Grieve as Bazur

Episode chronology
← Previous "Partings"	Next → "The Eye"
- The Lord of the Rings: The Rings of Power season 1

"Udûn" is the sixth episode of the first season of the American fantasy television series The Lord of the Rings: The Rings of Power, which is based on J. R. R. Tolkien's history of Middle-earth. It was written by Nicholas Adams, Justin Doble, and showrunners J. D. Payne and Patrick McKay, and directed by Charlotte Brändström.

The series is set thousands of years before Tolkien's novel The Lord of the Rings (1954–55), during the Second Age of Middle-earth. Filming for the first season took place in New Zealand, and work on episodes beyond the first two began in January 2021. Production wrapped for the season in August 2021. The episode-long battle for the Southlands is the culmination of several character arcs, bringing key characters together and featuring them in multiple action sequences that include archery, hand-to-hand combat, and horse stunts. The episode ends with the eruption of Mount Doom, created through visual effects, which turns the Southlands into the dark land of Mordor.

"Udûn" premiered on the streaming service Amazon Prime Video on September 30, 2022. It was estimated to have high viewership and received positive reviews, with praise for its narrative focus and the execution of the action sequences. Multiple critics found it to be the best episode of the season. "Udûn" received several awards and nominations, including a Primetime Creative Arts Emmy Award nomination for its sound editing and two wins at the 21st Visual Effects Society Awards.

== Background ==
The Lord of the Rings: The Rings of Power is based on J. R. R. Tolkien's history of Middle-earth. It is set thousands of years before his novels The Hobbit (1937) and The Lord of the Rings (1954–55). While it is contractually not a continuation of Peter Jackson's The Lord of the Rings (2001–2003) and The Hobbit (2012–2014) film trilogies, it is intended to be visually consistent with them, and the first season was produced in New Zealand like Jackson's films were. J. D. Payne and Patrick McKay were hired to develop the series and serve as its showrunners, with Charlotte Brändström set to direct two episodes of the first season.

The series covers the major events of Middle-earth's Second Age. Amazon did not acquire the rights to Tolkien's main Second Age writings, so the writers identified references to the period in The Hobbit, The Lord of the Rings, and the latter's appendices, and created a story that bridges those passages. The Second Age begins after the defeat of the "Dark Lord" Morgoth, when his army of Orcs are scattered and his lieutenant Sauron is in hiding. The large cast of characters includes Elves, Dwarves, Men, and Harfoots, the last being precursors to the diminutive Hobbits from The Hobbit and The Lord of the Rings.

== Plot ==
An army of Orcs and their leader, Adar, march on the tower of Ostirith searching for humans from the village of Tirharad. They find the tower abandoned, and the Elf Arondir triggers a booby-trap that collapses it on many of the Orcs. The humans, who already returned to Tirharad, celebrate. Meanwhile, the Elf Galadriel and her human companion Halbrand make their way towards the Southlands by ship with Queen Regent Míriel of Númenor and her soldiers. Galadriel meets Isildur and learns from his father, Elendil, that Isildur's mother drowned.

Arondir attempts to destroy the broken sword that the Orcs are seeking, but is unable to with conventional tools. He tells the human healer Bronwyn that he is going to hide it; her son, Theo, watches on. Arondir helps the town prepare for the next Orc attack. He professes his love to Bronwyn and promises a life together with her and Theo after the battle. That night, the Southlanders trap and kill several enemy soldiers who enter the village, but soon realize that many of the enemies they just killed were actually humans who joined Adar. Orc archers shoot at the Southlanders, killing and wounding many.

The surviving Southlanders retreat inside the Tirharad tavern, where Theo and Arondir cauterize a serious wound on Bronwyn's shoulder. Adar and the Orcs enter the tavern and demand the broken sword, killing more people and threatening Bronwyn. Theo reveals that he knows where Arondir hid the sword and gives it to Adar. The latter orders the rest of the humans to be killed, but is interrupted when the Númenóreans arrive on horseback. Adar gives Waldreg a task before attempting to flee; he is chased down and captured by Galadriel and Halbrand. The Númenóreans kill or capture the remaining Orcs.

Galadriel interrogates Adar, discovering that he is an Elf who was corrupted by Morgoth and turned into one of the first Orcs. He claims to have killed Sauron and is now focused on creating a home for all Orcs. A celebration is held where Halbrand is hailed as the King of the Southlands. Theo realizes that the broken sword is missing: Waldreg has it, and uses it to unlock the dam beside Ostirith. Water rushes through the Orcs' tunnels to the mountain Orodruin, entering a magma chamber beneath the mountain. The resulting pressure causes an eruption that covers the Southlands in lava, ash, and smoke.

== Production ==
=== Writing ===
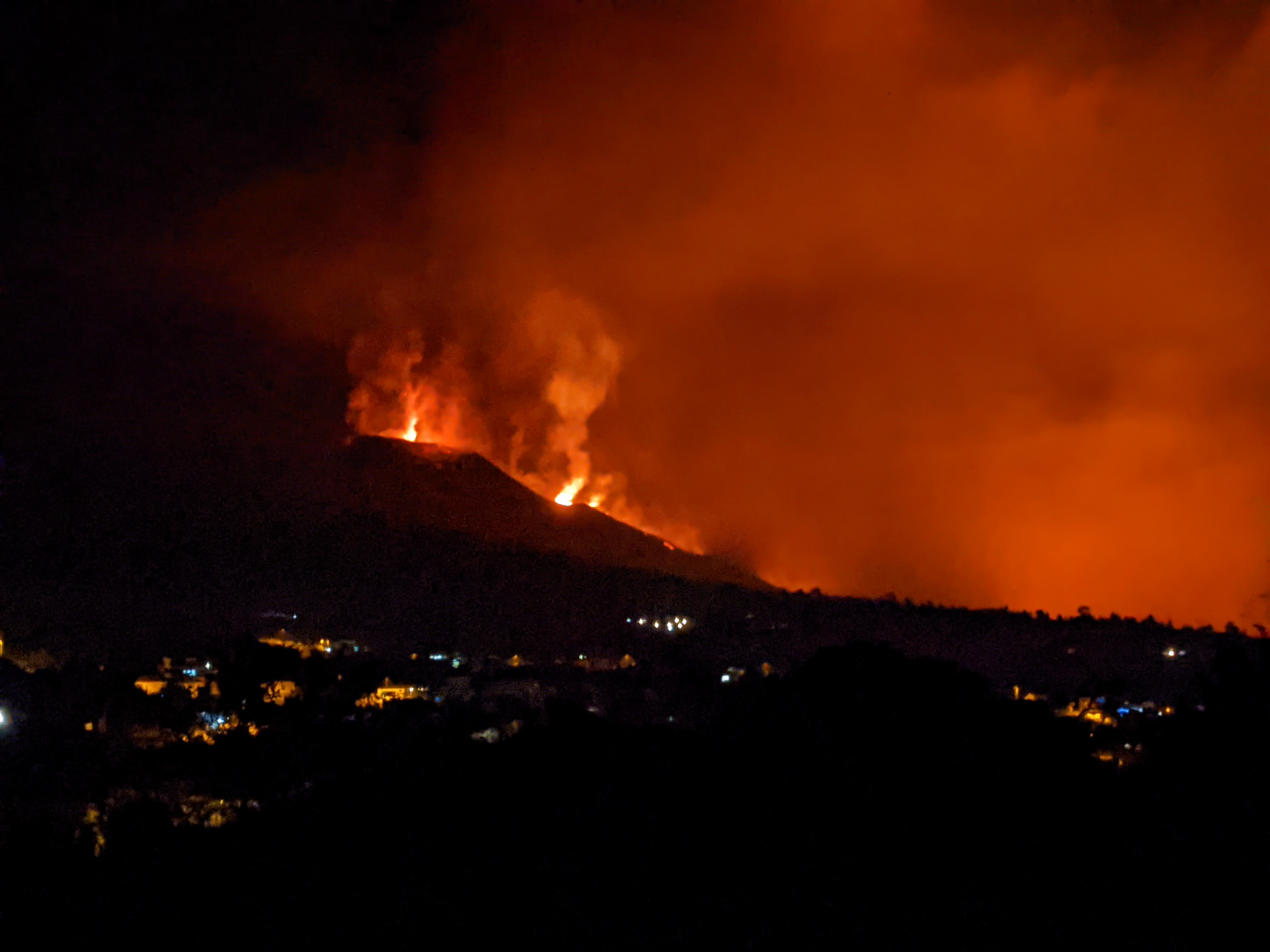
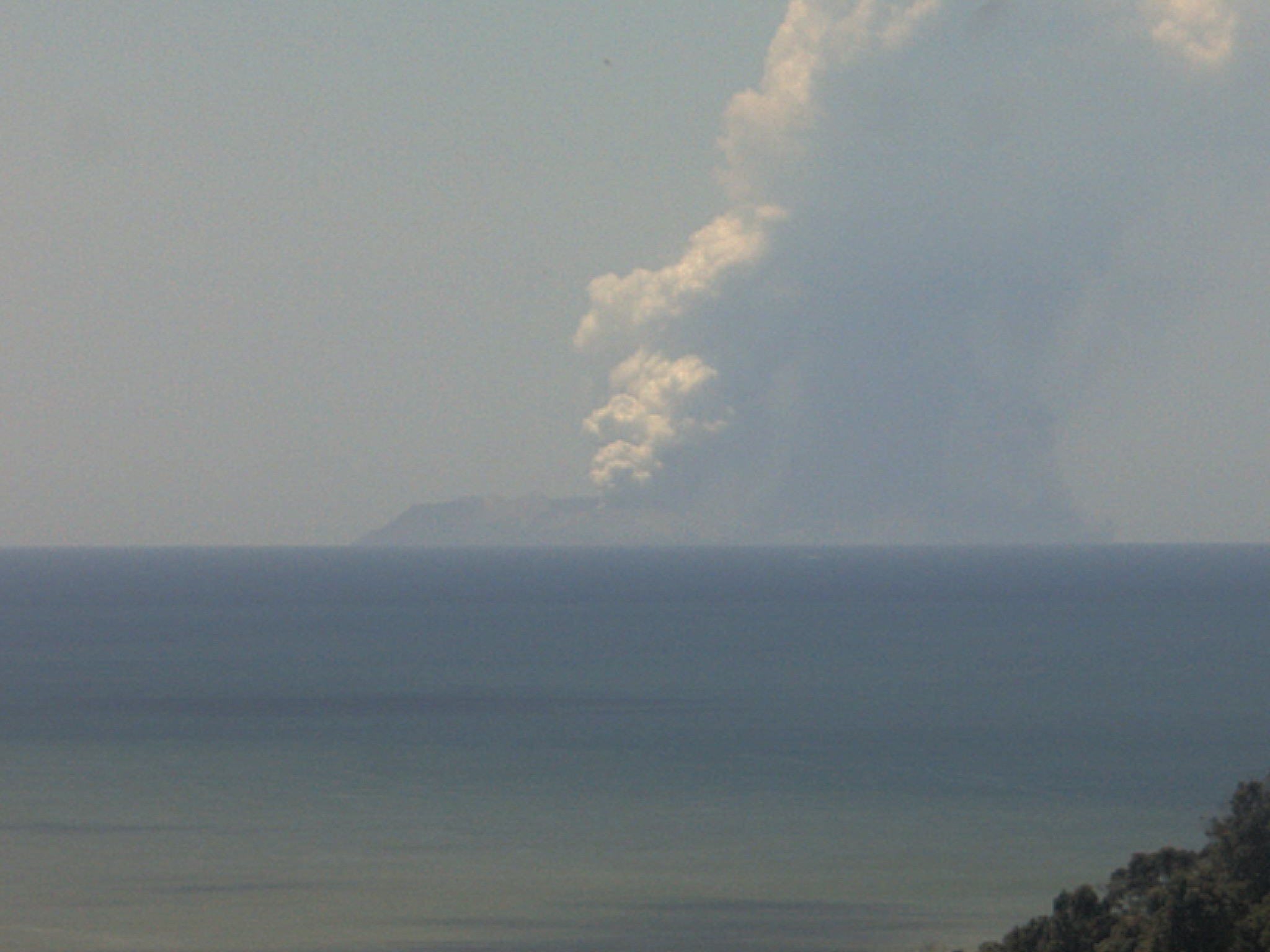
The eruption of Mount Doom in the episode was intended to be a "major centerpiece moment" for the series and a turning point for many character arcs. The visuals for the sequence were based on real eruptions, including the 2021 Cumbre Vieja volcanic eruption (top) and the 2019 Whakaari / White Island eruption (bottom).

The episode was written by Nicholas Adams, Justin Doble, Payne, and McKay. The showrunners wanted to introduce elements from The Lord of the Rings in surprising ways and evolve them to their original depiction, such as Mordor being introduced as the beautiful Southlands and being transformed by the eruption of Mount Doom. McKay said they wanted a "major centerpiece moment that... brand[s] the show", and said the eruption was supported by references in Tolkien's writings to the volcano reawakening after being dormant for centuries. Environmentalism was a key theme for Tolkien, and they felt it was appropriate that Mordor be a corruption of a beautiful land just as the Orcs are corrupted Elves.

The episode depicts a plan by the Orcs and their leader, Adar, to unlock a dam and send water rushing through tunnels to set off the volcanic eruption. The mechanics of this are "loosely based" on the real world physics of what would happen if a large amount of water entered the magma chamber under a volcano, as explained by series writer Gennifer Hutchison's father who is a geologist. The showrunners said the plan to ignite the volcano was put together by Sauron on the orders of the first Dark Lord, Morgoth, to create a land where their forces could retreat to in the event of defeat. Adar has co-opted that plan for his own purposes, which is to give his "children"—the Orcs—a home of their own. This aligns with Tolkien's idea that evil can only corrupt, not create, with Morgoth intending to corrupt an existing land for his forces, Sauron cruelly enlisting the Southlanders to build the dam that will one day lead to their home's destruction, and Adar "corrupting" their plans into one of his own. The writers considered beginning the episode with a cold open that showed Adar's backstory with Sauron, but they decided that there was not enough time to do the sequence justice; it was used as the cold open of the second-season premiere, "Elven Kings Under the Sky", instead. Adar prefers the term "Uruk" instead of "Orc" when referring to himself and his followers. "Uruk" is the name for Orcs in Black Speech, one of Tolkien's constructed languages. The character's preference was inspired by Adar actor Joseph Mawle, who personally disliked the word "Orc" being used on set even outside of filming. The episode's title, "Udûn", is the word for "hell" in Sindarin, one of Tolkien's constructed languages for the Elves. "Udûn" later becomes the name of a valley in northwest Mordor, where this episode takes place.

Since early writing work in 2018, the writers knew that the sixth episode would be the culmination of key character arcs for the first season, including those of Galadriel, Elendil, Isildur, Arondir, and Bronwyn. The writers' room had a board tracking the season's major characters and many of them had a pink card with a volcano on it, reflecting that the eruption is the major event of the season that impacts many lives. Despite the episode being very action-heavy, the showrunners liked the quieter character scenes that it includes such as Galadriel's discussions with Isildur and Elendil, and the scene where Arondir and Bronwyn plant seeds before the battle begins. The latter is reflected by Adar doing the same at the start of the episode, showing that he still follows some Elvish customs. The seeds that Arondir and Bronwyn plant are the same seeds that Bronwyn gave to Arondir in the first episode, "A Shadow of the Past", and Arondir uses some of them later in this episode to help heal Bronwyn after she is wounded. It was important to the showrunners that the episode have strong emotional stakes rather than just be about action sequences and special effects. They felt the audience would care about the fighting if they already cared about the family of Bronwyn, Theo, and Arondir.

The showrunners acknowledged that the scene between Galadriel and Halbrand late in the episode, where they discuss how they feel fighting together, could be perceived as romantic. However, they hoped by the end of the season that audiences would interpret it more as an acknowledgement that the two characters feel they are at their best when they work together. Earlier in the episode, Bronwyn comforts Theo by telling him that "this shadow is but a small and passing thing". This line is based on a similar one from The Lord of the Rings when the characters Frodo Baggins and Samwise Gamgee are making their way through Mordor. That is McKay's favorite Tolkien moment and he felt it was "fair game" to use because it was not directly adapted in Jackson's films.

=== Casting ===
The season's cast includes Cynthia Addai-Robinson as Míriel, Maxim Baldry as Isildur, Nazanin Boniadi as Bronwyn, Morfydd Clark as Galadriel, Ismael Cruz Córdova as Arondir, Tyroe Muhafidin as Theo, Lloyd Owen as Elendil, and Charlie Vickers as Halbrand. Also starring in the episode are Joseph Mawle as Adar, Geoff Morrell as Waldreg, Peter Tait as Tredwill, Anthony Crum as Ontamo, Alex Tarrant as Valandil, and Phil Grieve as Bazur. Jesse Turner, Mike Homick, Robert Strange, Jed Brophy, Edward Clendon, Luke Hawker, Ellyce Bisson, Rob Mackinnon, Hori Ahipene, and Tim McLachlan play unnamed Orcs in the episode.

=== Filming and design ===
Production on episodes beyond the first two began in January 2021, under the working title Untitled Amazon Project or simply UAP, following an extended filming break that began due to the COVID-19 pandemic. Brändström first began discussing plans for the sixth and seventh episodes while she was in COVID-19 quarantine on her way into New Zealand. Virtual production allowed Brändström and cinematographer Alex Disenhof to plan the two episodes within a digital environment. They had two months of pre-production before filming started. Brändström and Disenhof were inspired more by production designer Ramsey Avery's sets and artwork than what the other directors and cinematographers had done so far, believing they could bring a fresh perspective to the series because of their episodes' unique story elements and greater focus on location shooting. Brändström felt the episodes were more like one long film, with the sixth episode being the set-up for dramatic payoffs in the seventh. They chose to play into this by focusing on Galadriel's perspective at the end of the sixth episode and again at the start of the seventh. Brändström was confirmed to be in New Zealand for production in May 2021, and her episodes were filmed across 80 first unit shooting days and 30 second unit shooting days. Much of this episode is set at night, and seven weeks of night shoots took place during New Zealand's cold, muddy winter. Filming for the season wrapped on August 2.

Night filming for the episode underway on the Tirharad village set, which was built on a farm outside Auckland. A truss grid was hung from a crane to light the set from above.

The Tirharad village was built on a farm near Auckland, and was exposed to the weather for several months due to the extended production break. Avery said this gave the set natural aging, including real moss. The Ostirith tower set was built on a backlot at Kelly Park Film Studios, up to 40 feet (12 m). The rest of the tower was created through visual effects. Disenhof wanted to use real fire to light the episode, including a lot of torches, and designed the moonlight to be visible but to not overpower the torch light. The torches only lasted a minute each, giving limited time for each shot to be filmed. Disenhof used overhead lighting for the moonlight and underexposed the cameras to get the right look for the night scenes. He was careful to ensure that the characters and actions were still visible in the night scenes after some high-profile examples of television series being too dark to see. To counter the effects of wind during the night shoots, lights were added to a truss grid that was hung from a construction crane over the village set. This allowed wind to pass through the grid and not move the lights, which would not be possible with traditional filmmaking lights. Brändström said the episode uses more hand-held cameras and Dutch angles than others in the season because of the focus on action and dramatic moments. Bronwyn wears a red cloak during the battle scenes to make her stand out and to indicate that she is a healer.

The episode begins with Adar giving a speech to the Orcs. Disenhof found a tree that he wanted to frame the character beside, and Brändström directed Mawle to start behind the tree with a more intimate moment before emerging to make the speech. Arondir's speech later in the episode starts with the camera focused on an Orc's head before changing focus to Arondir. This shot was planned after Brändström and Disenhof saw the design team place an Orc head on a spike. One of the most challenging scenes for Disenhof was when the Númenórean ship is sailing at dawn, because the ship had to be filmed outside during the day. He used fabric covers, including a silk cover that was 150 feet (46 m) long by 50 feet (15 m) wide, to block the sunlight so he could create a "soft ambience" and a rising Sun effect. Brändström used Dutch angles for Galadriel's interrogation of Adar to show that she is losing balance and becoming destabilized. Short lenses differentiated this scene from the action sequences. The celebration scenes at the end of the episode take place in bright sunlight, contrasting with the nighttime battle scenes. Disenhof felt this would make the volcanic eruption more surprising. Practical explosions and water geysers were filmed in the village for the eruption, creating more natural reactions from the actors. The village was filmed with wide angles to show the practical effects, and the visual effects that were added later. The episode ends with Galadriel frozen in disbelief as the volcano erupts in front of her. Disenhof designed a shot that starts with her centered in a wide frame and then pushes in to a close-up, reflecting that the world is collapsing around her. The eruption shots were filmed later in the day, when the Sun was no longer on the village set, since the volcano's ash is meant to be blocking out the Sun.

==== Action and stunts ====
Vic Armstrong supervised the action sequences and was lead second unit director. A year-and-a-half of pre-visualization went into planning the episode's battle sequences, using virtual production, filming with the stunt team, storyboards, and practical models of the sets. Brändström reviewed the sets with Avery to determine where action beats could take place. They felt audiences would get tired of continuous sword fighting and instead approached the episode's battles as a series of individual skirmishes and moments for each main character. Brändström took inspiration from the action films Braveheart (1995) and Gladiator (2000), and the art of John Bauer. First and second units handled different parts of the fight sequences, and there were days where Brändström was directing in the village while Armstrong was on a nearby hill directing horses. Three cameras were used for the battle scenes: the main "A" camera, the "B" camera at a complementary angle, and the "C" camera looking for other interesting angles. Two technocranes, a camera dolly, limited steadicam, and hand-held cameras were all used. Disenhof used the Phantom Flex4K camera to film the Númenóreans riding towards the Southlands at 500 frames per second (FPS), capturing them in slow motion. Armstrong suggested that some action shots be filmed at 22 FPS, lower than the usual 24, to create a faster action style that Disenhof said gave "an extra bit of oomph". Some shots were sped up in post-production.

In the opening scene, Arondir fires an arrow to bring down the tower, jumps down from the rampart, kicks the door closed, and continues firing. Cordova filmed the entire sequence in one go, including the jump down which used a wire rig. Armstrong got the idea to pit the quick and agile Arondir against a big, brutal Orc from a scene in the film Raiders of the Lost Ark (1981) where Harrison Ford's Indiana Jones fights a large German mechanic played by Pat Roach. Armstrong was Ford's stunt double on that film. The fight took several weeks to film, and begins with Arondir falling off a roof before being thrown through a fence by the Orc. It appears to be one continuous shot but was filmed in multiple stages, including wire-work stunts when Cordova's stunt double Paddy Church falls off the roof and when Cordova is thrown through the fence. Cordova did most of the hand-to-hand fighting himself. Arondir's fighting style was inspired by martial arts such as Wushu and Capoeira, to differentiate him from the Númenórean military. Cordova trained for the episode's fight scenes for eight months, including three months focused on the fight with the large Orc. He initially tried to show that Arondir is a near-invincible Elf throughout the fight, but the creative team felt it would be more interesting to show him struggling more. A "mixture of gooey chocolate, gelatin and food coloring" was used when Arondir stabs the Orc in its eye and black Orc blood drops onto Arondir's mouth.

When Arondir is shooting arrows, Cordova was either filmed miming the action with no arrow or with a practical arrow which he would drop as he released the bow string, with the visual effects team adding the firing arrows. Cordova struggled to keep his fingers the correct distance apart when firing without a practical arrow, which was needed so the visual effects team could put the arrow between his fingers. To solve this, Cordova designed a double-fingered ring with a circle in the middle that was the circumference of an arrow. This was 3D-printed and allowed him to always have the right amount of space between his fingers.

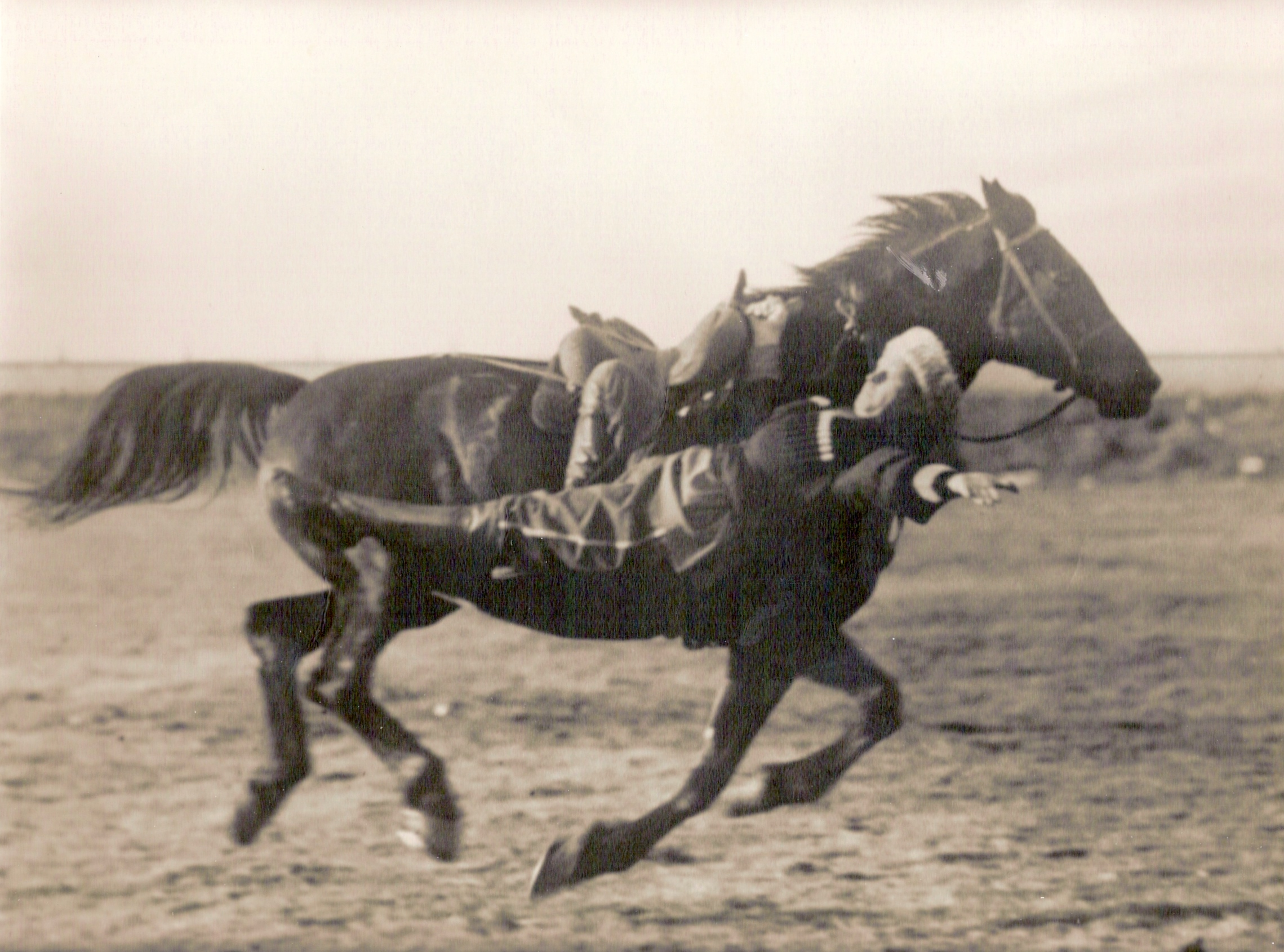
The episode includes horse riding tricks inspired by those used by the Cossacks. Pictured is a Cossack doing a riding trick called "wing".

Horsemaster Adrian Stent provided 45 horses as well as wranglers, coordinators, and trainers. The most horses on set for any one day was 28. Brändström hoped to have more but was limited by the pandemic. To make up for this, she filmed the same horses and riders coming from different directions and then used visual effects to expand on the number in each shot. Armstrong selected the horses for the main chase sequence. The actors who ride horses spent four months training before filming began. This was especially useful for Clark, who had never ridden a horse before and had to portray Galadriel as a skilled rider. Her horse, Titan, was one of the best trained horses available to the production.

Brändström studied ancient battles in preparation for the episode and took specific inspiration from the cavalry of the Cossacks, who used unique tricks to avoid enemy fire while on horse back. Brändström wanted to use these for the Númenóreans to show their special skills as horse riders. The stunt riders were not prepared to do tricks while riding the horses and had to do specific training to achieve Brändström's vision. A stunt where Galadriel slides off her saddle to one side to avoid attacking Orcs was performed by a stunt rider rather than Clark. Halbrand ends the chase sequence by leaning down and tripping Adar's horse as the pair ride towards each other. This was inspired by a scene that Armstrong doubled Ford for in the film Indiana Jones and the Last Crusade (1989), where Indiana Jones reaches down to pick up a rock while riding a horse. Other horse stunts that were filmed for the episode include riders falling off their horses, multiple riders pulling a chain between them to take out a group of Orcs, and a horse jumping over a group of Orcs. For the latter, the jumping horse was filmed separately from the Orc actors for safety reasons. A motion control camera was used so the footage of the Orcs and of the jumping horse could be combined in post-production. Armstrong wanted the Númenóreans to arrive at the village just as the Sun was rising, so the production only had a short window at the end of each night to capture those shots.

=== Visual effects ===
Visual effects for the episode were created by Industrial Light & Magic (ILM), Wētā FX, Method Studios, Rodeo FX, DNEG, Rising Sun Pictures, Cause and FX, Atomic Arts, and Cantina Creative. The different vendors were overseen by visual effects supervisor Jason Smith. DNEG was responsible for augmenting the action scenes, adding additional Orcs, horses, and Númenóreans to make the scenes feel more "dense". These were all based on scans of real horses and people rather than being created from scratch by the visual effects team. A shot of the Orcs crossing a bridge to the tower of Ostirith with their torches reflecting in the water was designed by Disenhof and Brändström in virtual production. They filmed the camera movement as best they could in the backlot where the tower set was built and handed that to the visual effects team to complete.

Wētā, ILM, and Rising Sun all contributed to the water and volcano effects at the end of the episode. Wētā created Ostirith and handled shots of water flowing from the dam into the Orcs' tunnels; ILM was responsible for the water inside the tunnels, using scans of the real tunnel sets, and the initial eruption; and Rising Sun created the ash cloud and falling lava in the village. The visual effects team studied real-life volcanic eruptions as reference for the sequence, including the eruption of Mount Vesuvius in 79 AD and the 1980 eruption of Mount St. Helens, as well as the more recent 2021 Cumbre Vieja volcanic eruption and the 2019 Whakaari / White Island eruption. They also looked at films that feature volcanic eruptions. Producer Ron Ames compared the episode's version to an atomic bomb. Based on their research, Smith wanted to have a clear timeline of the characters seeing the eruption, hearing it, and being hit with a shockwave. The design of Mount Doom was influenced by its depiction in Jackson's films as well as Tolkien's illustrations and descriptions.

=== Music ===
Composer Bear McCreary began work in July 2021, and started by composing the main themes for the series. He wrote an "anthem" for each culture and then created individual character themes that relate to their culture's music in different ways. The sixth episode's score brings together several of those themes for the first time, including those for Bronwyn and Arondir; Númenor in general and the Faithful Númenóreans specifically; Halbrand, which also represents the Southlands; and Galadriel. For the episode's many action sequences, McCreary said he "pushed the limits of my action music composition, employing every technique I have ever learned." He took inspiration from John Williams's music for the Indiana Jones films for Arondir's fight with the large Orc, and did an orchestral version of John Carpenter's synth music for the scene where Bronwyn is wounded.

Raya Yarbrough, McCreary's wife and frequent collaborator, contributed vocals for Bronwyn and Arondir's theme—singing in Sindarin—for when Bronwyn comforts Theo before the battle and when she is hit by an arrow during it. McCreary enjoyed the dramatic irony of having Yarbrough's voice return as a "musical ghost" for the arrow scene. For Galadriel and Halbrand chasing down Adar on horseback, McCreary wanted to underline the moment's importance by composing a new piece of music rather than using his existing character themes. This piece is called "Nolwa Mahtar", which means "Brave Warrior" in Quenya, another of Tolkien's Elvish constructed languages. It includes a choir singing in Quenya. McCreary originally intended this to be a one-off track, but he started looking for an opportunity to use it again in future episodes. When Galadriel interrogates Adar and the latter claims to have killed Sauron, McCreary chose to underline the moment with a "huge swell in the orchestra". The showrunners asked him to change this to a more subdued moment to keep the focus on Mawle's performance. In the following scene, where Galadriel and Halbrand talk, the sound mixing team found that Halbrand's theme was overpowering Vickers's dialogue. McCreary solved this by changing the scene's key instrument from a fiddle to a cello, and his team organized a last minute session to record the change. To end the episode's score, McCreary composed a "symphonic finale" with a choir singing in Quenya that accompanies the volcanic eruption.

The Lord of the Rings: The Rings of Power (Season One, Episode Six: Udûn – Amazon Original Series Soundtrack)

Film score by Bear McCreary
- Released: September 29, 2022
- Genres: Orchestra; choir; world
- Length: 48:56
- Languages: English; Constructed languages
- Labels: Amazon; Mondo

Bear McCreary chronology
Partings (2022)	Udûn (2022)	The Eye (2022)

A soundtrack album featuring McCreary's score for the episode was released digitally on the streaming service Amazon Music on September 29, 2022. McCreary said the album contained "virtually every second of score" from the episode. It was added to other music streaming services after the full first season was released. A CD featuring the episode's music is included in a limited edition box set collection for the season from Mondo, Amazon Music, and McCreary's label Sparks & Shadows. The box set was released on April 26, 2024, and includes a journal written by McCreary which details the creation of the episode's score. All music was composed by Bear McCreary:

Track listing
No.	Title	Length
1.	"March of Orcs"	5:13
2.	"The Coming of Night"	3:28
3.	"In Defiance of Death"	5:32
4.	"The Siege in the Southlands"	20:08
5.	"Transformed by Darkness"	8:23
6.	"Sorrow, Water and Flame"	6:12
Total length:		48:56

== Release ==
"Udûn" premiered on the streaming service Amazon Prime Video on September 30, 2022. It was released at the same time around the world, in more than 240 countries and territories. For two weeks leading up to the second season's premiere on August 29, 2024, the first season was made available for free on the streaming service Samsung TV Plus in the US, Canada, Brazil, the United Kingdom, and Germany.

Ahead of the third season's release in November 2026, a home media release for the first two seasons was announced. Each release features the eight episodes of the respective season along with behind-the-scenes content. They were released on 4K Ultra HD, Blu-ray, and DVD on November 3, and in limited edition 4K UHD SteelBook—with Amazon exclusive collectable art cards—on December 1.

== Reception ==
=== Viewership ===
Whip Media, which tracks viewership data for the 21 million worldwide users of its TV Time app, calculated that for the week ending October 2, two days after the episode's debut, The Rings of Power was the second-highest original streaming series for US viewership behind Disney+'s She-Hulk: Attorney at Law. This was a move up from being fifth-place the week before. Nielsen Media Research, which records streaming viewership on US television screens, estimated that the series was watched for 966 million minutes during the week ending October 2. This put the series in third-place on the company's list of top streaming series and films for the week, behind only Netflix's Cobra Kai and Disney+'s Hocus Pocus 2. Parrot Analytics determines audience "demand expressions" based on various data sources, including social media activity and comments on rating platforms. During the week ending October 7, the company calculated that The Rings of Power was 30.3 times more in demand than the average US streaming series, moving it up to seventh on the company's top 10 list for the week.

=== Critical response ===
On review aggregator Rotten Tomatoes, 87% of 30 critics gave the episode a positive review and the average of rated reviews was 8.3 out of 10. The critics consensus reads, "Focusing on a battle for the Southlands, 'Udûn' features some of the most rollicking action ever witnessed on television and delivers The Rings of Power's most conventionally satisfying episode yet."

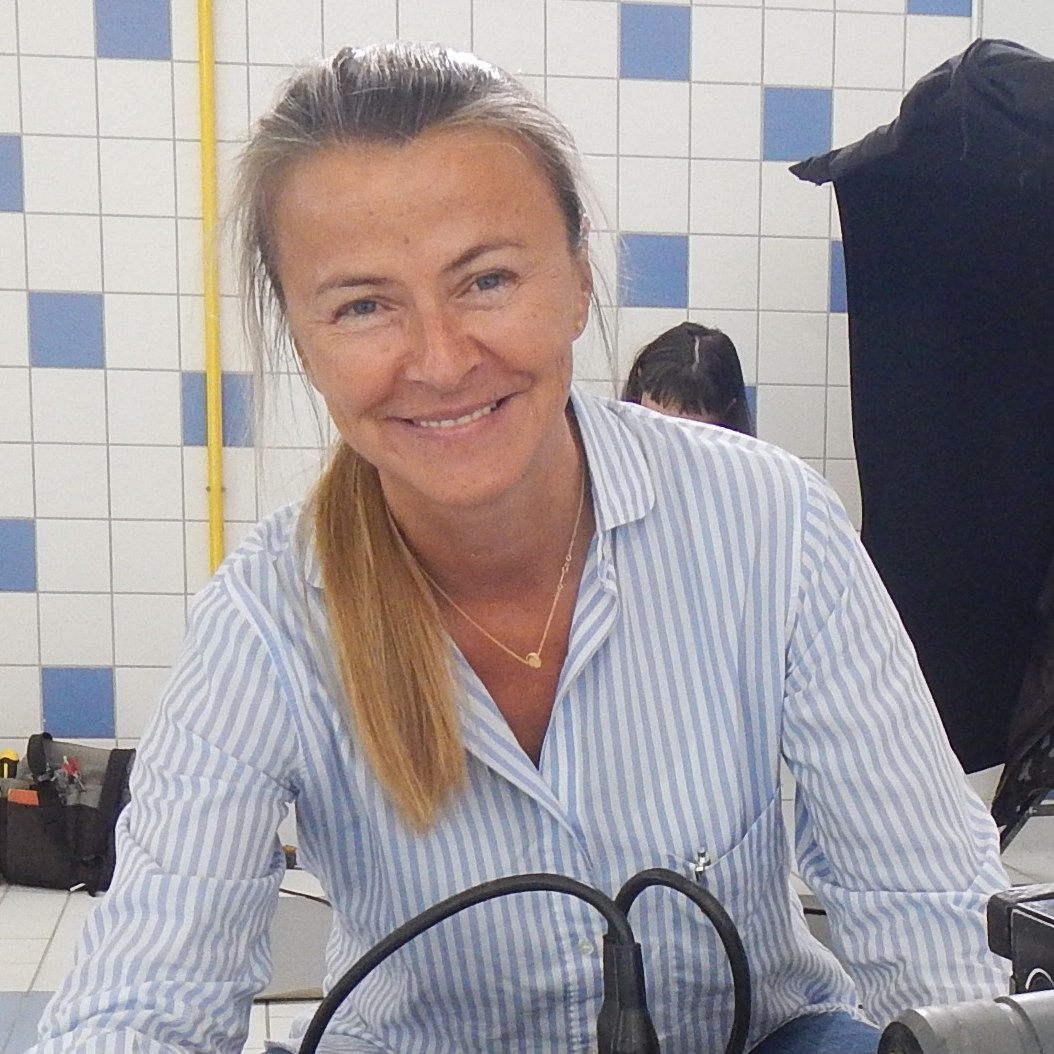
The episode's direction and action sequences were praised. Pictured is director Charlotte Brändström.

Samantha Nelson at IGN scored the episode 10 out of 10, calling it "an absolutely extraordinary hour of television" that she compared to Jackson's The Lord of the Rings: The Two Towers (2002) and the battle episodes of the series Game of Thrones (2011–2019) and The Witcher (2019–present). Vulture's Keith Phipps gave the episode five stars out of five and said it was the most exciting episode of the series so far, while Jack Shepherd of Total Film also praised the episode as the best of the series so far and gave it four-and-a-half stars out of five. Shepherd and TechRadar's Tom Power both described "Udûn" as a series-defining episode. Power gave it five stars out of five and called it "the most thrilling, triumphant, and torturous installment" of the series yet. Andy Welch, writing for The Guardian, praised the episode and said the patience of fans had been rewarded after the slow pace of previous episodes. The narrative and character focus was highlighted by multiple critics. Juliette Harrisson at Den of Geek felt there were still pacing issues with the episode, and thought the effectiveness of the action was hampered by the characters not being better established in earlier episodes, but said the series was "finally starting to really kick into gear" and gave the episode three-and-a-half stars out of five.

Phipps said the episode could not live up to the "impossibly high bar" of the Battle of Helm's Deep in The Two Towers, but said the episode's action was still impressive. He praised Brändström's staging of the battle scenes and key moments, particularly when Arondir is almost stabbed in the eye. Shepherd said the episode's production value matched that of a feature film and the battle scenes would not seem out of place in Jackson's films. Nelson praised the direction and choreography of the action scenes. Christian Holub graded the episode an "A-" for Entertainment Weekly and said the action worked because of the constant changes in momentum throughout the episode. Key moments that were highlighted by multiple critics include Galadriel's saddle tricks while riding her horse, the fight where Arondir is covered with an Orc's blood, the reveal that the humans have been killing other humans, and the arrival of the Númenórean riders which was compared to the arrival of the Rohan riders in The Two Towers. The brutal, graphic violence in some scenes was also noted. James Whitbrook at Gizmodo said the episode featured "grand action" and he would have considered it to be a "pretty solid episode" if it ended with a victory for the heroes, but was made better by the eruption at the end. Power thought the eruption would be controversial with Tolkien fans but said it worked well as a "momentous event" for the series. Welch felt the visual effects for the eruption were the most impressive put to screen.

Shepherd thought Galadriel's interrogation of Adar gave her more nuance than the rest of the series so far, and highlighted the use of Dutch angles in the scene. Matt Schimkowitz of The A. V. Club, who graded the episode an "A-", praised Mawle's layered performance as Adar and discussed how the series was giving added depth to the Orcs when compared to Tolkien's writings, believing this to be a critique of the author. Other critics also discussed the interrogation scene and the series' approach to the Orcs. Holub said it was the slowest part of the episode but one of the most interesting. Leon Miller at Polygon said it was the episode's most memorable scene, despite all the action and spectacle. He questioned whether the Orcs were being shown too much sympathy considering Tolkien's heroic characters continue to kill large numbers of them in this series and other stories.

=== Accolades ===
"Udûn" was listed as one of the best episodes of 2022 by Entertainment Weekly and Mashable.

Accolades received by the The Lord of the Rings: The Rings of Power episode "Udûn"
Award	Date of ceremony	Category	Recipient(s)	Result	Ref.
Golden Reel Awards	February 26, 2023	Outstanding Achievement in Sound Editing – Broadcast Long Form Dialogue / ADR	Robby Stambler, Damian Del Borrello, Stefanie Ng, Ailene Roberts, Ray Beentjes, and Gareth Van Niekirk	Nominated	
Golden Reel Awards	February 26, 2023	Outstanding Achievement in Sound Editing – Broadcast Long Form Effects / Foley	Damian Del Borrello, Robby Stambler, Paula Fairfield, James Miller, Chris Terhune, Gareth Van Niekerk, Ryan A. Sullivan, Goeun Everett, Richard Wills, Jonathan Bruce, and Amy Barber	Nominated	
Primetime Creative Arts Emmy Awards	January 7, 2024	Outstanding Sound Editing for a Comedy or Drama Series (One-Hour)	Robert Stambler, Damian Del Borrello, Ailene Roberts, Stefanie Ng, Paula Fairfield, Chris Terhune, James Miller, Michael Baber, Jason Smith, Amy Barber, and Jonathan Bruce	Nominated	
Visual Effects Society Awards	February 15, 2023	Outstanding Visual Effects in a Photoreal Episode	Jason Smith, Ron Ames, Nigel Sumner, Tom Proctor, and Dean Clarke	Won	
Visual Effects Society Awards	February 15, 2023	Outstanding Effects Simulations in an Episode, Commercial, or Real-Time Project	Kurt Debens, Hamish Bell, Robert Kelly, and Gabriel Roccisano (for Volcano Destruction)	Won	
Visual Effects Society Awards	February 15, 2023	Outstanding Effects Simulations in an Episode, Commercial, or Real-Time Project	Rick Hankins, Aron Bonar, Branko Grujcic, and Laurent Kermel (for Water and Magma)	Nominated	
Visual Effects Society Awards	February 15, 2023	Outstanding Compositing and Lighting in an Episode	Sornalingam P, Ian Copeland, Nessa Mingfang Zhang, and Yuvaraj S (for Tirharad Cavalry Charge)	Nominated	

== Companion media ==
An episode of the official aftershow Deadline's Inside the Ring: LOTR: The Rings of Power for "Udûn" was released on October 1, 2022. Hosted by Deadline Hollywood's Dominic Patten and Anthony D'Alessandro, it features exclusive "footage and insights" for the episode, plus interviews with cast members Owen, Cordova, Clark, Vickers, Muhafidin, Baldry, and Boniadi as well as Brändström, Doble, and McCreary. On October 14, The Official The Lord of the Rings: The Rings of Power Podcast was released on Amazon Music. Hosted by actress Felicia Day, the sixth episode is dedicated to "Udûn" and features Córdova, Payne, and McKay. On November 21, a bonus segment featuring behind-the-scenes footage from the episode was added to Prime Video's X-Ray feature as part of a series titled "The Making of The Rings of Power".
