= Partings (The Lord of the Rings: The Rings of Power) =

- The Lord of the Rings: The Rings of Power episode
- Cover art for the episode's soundtrack album
- Episode no.: Season 1 Episode 5
- Directed by: Wayne Che Yip
- Written by: Justin Doble
- Cinematography by: Aaron Morton
- Editing by: Stefan Grube; Cheryl Potter
- Original release date: September 23, 2022
- Running time: 72 minutes

Additional cast
- Beau Cassidy as Dilly Brandyfoot; Joseph Mawle as Adar; Ian Blackburn as Rowan; Geoff Morrell as Waldreg; Peter Tait as Tredwill; Thusitha Jayasundera as Malva; Maxine Cuncliffe as Vilma; Anthony Crum as Ontamo; Alex Tarrant as Valandil; Ken Blackburn as Tar-Palantir; Edith Poor as the Nomad; Kali Kopae as the Ascetic; Bridie Sisson as the Dweller; Edward Clendon as Grugzûk; Phil Vaughan as the smithy; Ella Hope-Higginson as Mairen

Episode chronology
← Previous "The Great Wave"	Next → "Udûn"
- The Lord of the Rings: The Rings of Power season 1

"Partings" is the fifth episode of the first season of the American fantasy television series The Lord of the Rings: The Rings of Power, which is based on J. R. R. Tolkien's history of Middle-earth. It was written by Justin Doble and directed by Wayne Che Yip.

The series is set thousands of years before Tolkien's novel The Lord of the Rings (1954–55), during the Second Age of Middle-earth. Filming for the first season took place in New Zealand, and work on episodes beyond the first two began in January 2021. Production wrapped for the season in August 2021. This episode includes a legend called "The Song of the Roots of Hithaeglir" that connects the ore mithril to the powerful Silmarils; Wētā FX created the visual effects for the sequence. It also includes an original song, "This Wandering Day", which is sung by actress Megan Richards with lyrics written by Payne.

"Partings" premiered on the streaming service Amazon Prime Video on September 23, 2022. It was estimated to have high viewership and received generally positive reviews.

== Background ==
The Lord of the Rings: The Rings of Power is based on J. R. R. Tolkien's history of Middle-earth. It is set thousands of years before his novels The Hobbit (1937) and The Lord of the Rings (1954–55). While it is contractually not a continuation of Peter Jackson's The Lord of the Rings (2001–2003) and The Hobbit (2012–2014) film trilogies, it is intended to be visually consistent with them, and the first season was produced in New Zealand like Jackson's films were. J. D. Payne and Patrick McKay were hired to develop the series and serve as its showrunners, with Wayne Che Yip set to direct four episodes of the first season.

The series covers the major events of Middle-earth's Second Age. Amazon did not acquire the rights to Tolkien's main Second Age writings, so the writers identified references to the period in The Hobbit, The Lord of the Rings, and the latter's appendices, and created a story that bridges those passages. The Second Age begins after the defeat of the "Dark Lord" Morgoth, when his army of Orcs are scattered and his lieutenant Sauron is in hiding. The large cast of characters includes Elves, Dwarves, Men, and Harfoots, the last being precursors to the diminutive Hobbits from The Hobbit and The Lord of the Rings.

== Plot ==
Young Harfoots Nori Brandyfoot and Poppy Proudfellow are attacked by a pack of wolves. The Stranger uses magic to scare the wolves off, but injures his arm in the process. He uses more magic to heal himself and nearly hurts Nori, frightening her. Three mysterious women find the location where the Stranger fell from the sky in a meteor.

At the tower of Ostirith in the Southlands, human healer Bronwyn prepares for an attack from the Orcs. Waldreg convinces some other humans to join the Orcs but is disappointed to learn that the Orcs' leader, Adar, is not Sauron. Waldreg chooses to serve Adar, who orders him to kill another human, Rowan, to prove his loyalty. At the tower, Bronwyn's son Theo shows the broken sword he secretly carries to the Elf Arondir, who says it is a key designed to enslave the Southlanders.

Númenórean captain Elendil denies his son Isildur's request to join Númenor's expedition to the Southlands. The Elf Galadriel tells Queen Regent Míriel that her human companion Halbrand will be accompanying them to claim the throne of the Southlands, but he never agreed to that and says he wants to remain in Númenor. Halbrand accuses Galadriel of using him. Kemen, the son of Míriel's cousin Chancellor Pharazôn, tries to convince his father to cancel the expedition, but Pharazôn sees potential in turning the Southlands into a tributary state. King Tar-Palantir warns Míriel not to go to Middle-earth.

Elven High-King Gil-galad reveals to Elrond that he knows of the existence of mithril, an ore that seemingly contains the light from a lost Silmaril. Gil-galad believes the ore can counteract the fading power of the Elves in Middle-earth. Out of loyalty to Prince Durin IV, Elrond refuses to confirm if the Dwarves have found the ore and Gil-galad accuses him of putting the Dwarves before his own race. Elrond discusses the issue with Durin IV and the latter agrees to help. The pair return to Khazad-dûm to try convince King Durin III.

Kemen attempts to destroy the expedition ships and discovers Isildur stowing away. Isildur prevents the destruction of three of the five ships and saves Kemen's life. Isildur subsequently receives a spot on the expedition crew as a stable sweep. Galadriel apologizes for using Halbrand and opens up to him. He decides to go with the expeditionary force, and the remaining ships depart for Middle-earth.

== Production ==
=== Writing ===
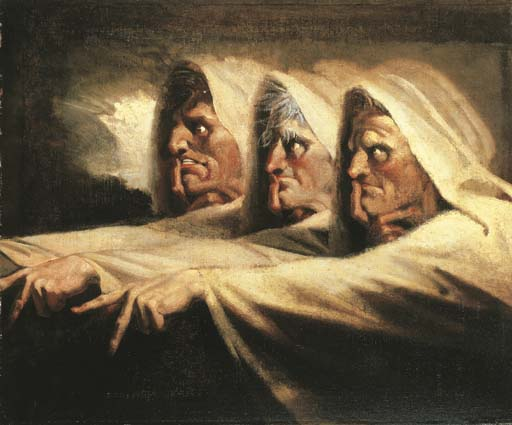
The three "Mystics" were inspired by the Three Witches from William Shakespeare's play Macbeth. Pictured is The Three Witches by Henry Fuseli.

"Partings" was written by Justin Doble. It introduces three mysterious women referred to as "The Mystics", who are from the land of Rhûn in the east of Middle-earth. The women have been awaiting the arrival of the Stranger and believe he is someone important to them. The showrunners were inspired by the Three Witches from William Shakespeare's play Macbeth when creating the characters. Before the series' release, there was speculation that one of these characters was Sauron in disguise.

Payne felt the scene where Nori Brandyfoot and the Stranger discuss whether he is good or evil was an example of the season balancing smaller character moments with wider stakes. The showrunners felt they did not always get this balance right and wanted to improve on that in future seasons. Yip noted that Nori has been defending the Stranger since meeting him at the start of the series, and this episode shows him becoming a surrogate member of the Brandyfoot family as he spends several weeks migrating with the Harfoots and defending them from wolves. Nori believes the latter is final proof that the Stranger is good, a notion that is challenged when she is accidentally hurt by his magic later in the episode.

The episode includes a legend called "The Song of the Roots of Hithaeglir" that Elrond recites to Gil-galad. It tells of an Elf warrior who fought a Balrog, an ancient demon from the First Age, over a tree at the top of the Misty Mountains because the tree contained one of the lost Silmarils—powerful jewels from the First Age. During their battle, the tree was struck by lightning and the power of the Silmaril created a new ore within the mountains. This legend was invented for the series as part of a "grand unification theory" that the writers wanted to tell, which connects the Silmarils to the powerful ore mithril and eventually to the Rings of Power. Elrond notes that the legend is generally seen to be "apocryphal", which is a line that the writers added to give themselves "a little bit of wiggle room" with Tolkien fans who disagreed with these changes from the established lore.

=== Casting ===
The season's cast includes Cynthia Addai-Robinson as Míriel, Robert Aramayo as Elrond, Owain Arthur as Durin IV, Maxim Baldry as Isildur, Nazanin Boniadi as Bronwyn, Morfydd Clark as Galadriel, Ismael Cruz Córdova as Arondir, Charles Edwards as Celebrimbor, Trystan Gravelle as Pharazôn, Lenny Henry as Sadoc Burrows, Ema Horvath as Eärien, Markella Kavenagh as Elanor "Nori" Brandyfoot, Tyroe Muhafidin as Theo, Lloyd Owen as Elendil, Megan Richards as Poppy Proudfellow, Dylan Smith as Largo Brandyfoot, Charlie Vickers as Halbrand, Leon Wadham as Kemen, Benjamin Walker as Gil-galad, Daniel Weyman as the Stranger, and Sara Zwangobani as Marigold Brandyfoot. Also starring in the episode are Beau Cassidy as Dilly Brandyfoot, Joseph Mawle as Adar, Ian Blackburn as Rowan, Geoff Morrell as Waldreg, Peter Tait as Tredwill, Thusitha Jayasundera as Malva, Maxine Cuncliffe as Vilma, Anthony Crum as Ontamo, Alex Tarrant as Valandil, Ken Blackburn as Tar-Palantir, Edith Poor as the Nomad, Kali Kopae as the Ascetic, Bridie Sisson as the Dweller, Edward Clendon as Grugzûk, Phil Vaughan as the smithy, and Ella Hope-Higginson as Mairen. Jed Brophy, Luke Hawker, Phil Grieve, and Robert Strange play unnamed Orcs in the episode.

=== Filming ===
Production on episodes beyond the first two began in January 2021, under the working title Untitled Amazon Project or simply UAP, following an extended filming break that began due to the COVID-19 pandemic. Yip directed the episode, and confirmed that he had begun filming his episodes by March. Aaron Morton was the cinematographer for Yip's episodes. Filming for the season wrapped on August 2.

Vic Armstrong supervised the action sequences and was lead second unit director. He ensured there were foreground elements when the wolves chase the Harfoots through a forest, to help establish what speed the creatures are moving at. Some tree pieces were attached with magnets so they could be moved in shots where the wolves pass by. The sword fight between Galadriel and several Númenórean cadets required Clark to fight with two swords and make 60 different movements. She was concerned about being "uncoordinated", but picked up the choreography quickly after starting with simple duel wielding movements. Yip hoped the scene would be a "source of joy" for the audience, especially since it was the first chance to show Galadriel sword fighting since the first episode, "A Shadow of the Past". He said the choreography was complicated but straightforward to film because no stunt doubles were required. This meant they did not have to hide any stunt double faces and could just move the camera with the choreography. It took one day to film.

Vickers trained in blacksmith techniques to prepare for the scene where Halbrand does some smithy work in the episode. He, Yip, and Clark considered the forge scene between Halbrand and Galadriel to be pivotal for the characters. They spent a day filming it, working through different variations. Doble said there was an "emotional truth" that each character had to face about themselves in the scene before their stories could progress. Yip and Morton aimed to use specific shots to create the feeling that Galadriel has cornered Halbrand at the beginning of the scene, and to show that Halbrand gains the upper hand later on. When their discussion becomes more intense, the camera angles move from wide shots to closer shots where the actors are almost staring directly into the camera. Yip intended this to represent the characters "staring directly into each other's souls".

=== Visual effects ===
Visual effects for the episode were created by Industrial Light & Magic (ILM), Wētā FX, Method Studios, Rodeo FX, Cause and FX, Atomic Arts, and Cantina Creative. The different vendors were overseen by visual effects supervisor Jason Smith. Rodeo handled much of the Harfoot storyline, including environment augmentation, scale work, and fire and magic effects. The wolves in the episode were created by ILM, and were referred to as "Predators" by the production. They were intended to be more naturalistic than the Warg that is seen in the third episode, "Adar", because they are "hungry and threatening but they are not bred to be evil". Smith said their design "sits somewhere between dog and pig" and was influenced by prehistoric warthogs. When the Númenóreans are preparing to leave for Middle-earth, a horse can be seen in the background being loaded onto a ship by crane. This was added by the visual effects team after they had discussions about how the horses would get onto the ships and decided to add a crane to the harbor so they could show this happening.

"The Song of the Roots of Hithaeglir" is a legend told in the episode where an Elf fights a Balrog, with visual effects by Wētā FX.

The Balrog previously appeared in Jackson's films, created through visual effects by Wētā. That company returned to work on the Balrog and the wider "The Song of the Roots of Hithaeglir" sequence. By the time Wētā was involved in the episode, the series' design team had considered different approaches to the Balrog before deciding that it should "at least rhyme if not end up fairly close" to the design that was used in the films. The Balrog is a creature of smoke and flame which is sometimes depicted with wings, though there are debates among Tolkien fans about whether it should be. Wētā concept artist Nick Keller pitched versions of the character that had no wings and were more humanoid, but these were rejected in favor of consistency with the film version, which has wings. Despite this, some changes were still made to the Balrog and Smith said it was important that his team "feel that we have [done] our own take" on the character. A new head was designed by concept artist Allen Williams that is sharper, more elongated, and has the horns pointing in a more downward direction than the film version. Other changes include more ethereal smoke-like extremities to the wings, and having its hardened lava-like skin form into an armor shape inspired by Gothic plate armor. The latter was suggested by Keller. Smith noted that Balrogs are Maiar, which have the ability to change forms, so that could be used to explain the differences between the designs.

=== Music ===
==== "This Wandering Day" ====
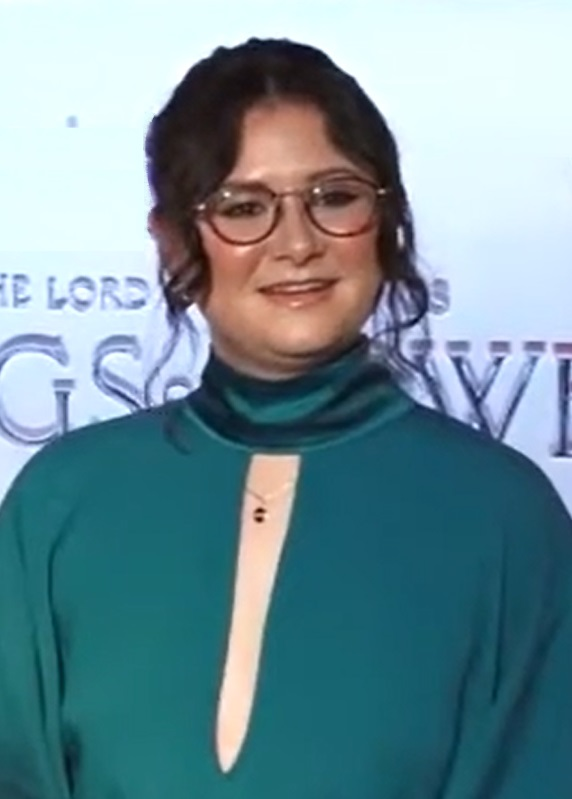
Megan Richards sings the original song "This Wandering Day"

At a karaoke night in Auckland during the production's extended filming break, Megan Richards sang with director J. A. Bayona. Impressed by her singing, the producers decided to add a song for her to sing in character as Poppy. The showrunners felt it was important to include music and songs in the series since the world was created by music in Tolkien's history, and because his characters often sing in the books. Payne wrote the lyrics for the song and was inspired by the lullaby "Black Swan" in the short opera The Medium (1946), which he said was both haunting and beautiful. He felt this combination of qualities was often found in Tolkien's works and aligned with the idea of the nomadic Harfoots who are always migrating and leaving things behind. The lyrics include references to replacing what you have known with the unknown ahead, and future locations calling to you on your journey. The song, titled "This Wandering Day", also includes the line "not all who wonder or wander are lost", which is a reference to a similar line that the Wizard Gandalf says in The Lord of the Rings.

Musicians Janet Roddick, David Donaldson, and Steve Roche, who form the group Plan 9, and their collaborator David Long returned from the films to provide music during filming. They wrote the melody for the song and recorded a demo version sung by Roddick. Richards was filmed singing the song several months before composer Bear McCreary joined the series. He was pleased to see that songs were being included for the same reasons that the showrunners wanted to add them, and praised the work done on the song so far. McCreary produced the final version using an orchestra, harp, and Celtic instruments, plus he had Richards record her vocals in a studio so the song could transition from her on-set vocals to a more polished version as the scene becomes a montage of the Harfoots migrating. Finally, McCreary and the showrunners felt the episode would not be complete without Roddick's demo version of the song, which they had become used to hearing during the production process. McCreary produced a polished version of her rendition that is heard during the episode's end credits. Because the in-universe explanation is that Poppy learned the song from her mother before the latter died, McCreary imagined that Roddick's version was the "angelic voice" of Poppy's mother singing to her daughter.

==== Episode score ====
McCreary began work in July 2021, and started by composing the main themes for the series. He wrote an "anthem" for each culture and then created individual character themes that relate to their culture's music in different ways. The fifth episode is the first to use all of McCreary's themes, including a new one that represents the Mystics. Additionally, a Japanese shakuhachi flute is used to represent the wolves.

For Galadriel's sword fight, McCreary had an idea for a unique musical moment where every movement of her body and sword is accompanied by an impossible-sounding violin performance. The approach of matching the score to each beat of action on screen is sometimes called "Mickey Mousing", a term that is generally considered to be derogatory in film composition. Despite this, McCreary felt it made this scene delightful and exciting. The track is performed by violinist Sandy Cameron who McCreary said was a "true virtuoso", and he wanted to challenge her with the difficulty of the music. During recording, Cameron added more notes to make it easier for her to go as high and fast as McCreary wanted. A solo cello is added when Galadriel begins sparring with two cadets at once. McCreary noted that the cue is an outlier for the series in that it mostly does not use any of his main themes, except for a short quote of Galadriel's theme at the end of the piece. He usually expects to compose the music for a two-minute scene like this in one day, but took nearly a week for this one which put extra pressure on himself for the rest of the episode's score. Though he did not think this was the most important scene in the episode, he was "unable to resist the temptation to compose something really special for it".

The Lord of the Rings: The Rings of Power (Season One, Episode Five: Partings – Amazon Original Series Soundtrack)

Film score by Bear McCreary
- Released: September 22, 2022
- Genres: Orchestra; choir; world
- Length: 55:08
- Languages: English; Constructed languages
- Labels: Amazon; Mondo

Bear McCreary chronology
The Great Wave (2022)	Partings (2022)	Udûn (2022)

A soundtrack album featuring McCreary's score for the episode was released digitally on the streaming service Amazon Music on September 22, 2022. McCreary said the album contained "virtually every second of score" from the episode. It was added to other music streaming services after the full first season was released. A CD featuring the episode's music is included in a limited edition box set collection for the season from Mondo, Amazon Music, and McCreary's label Sparks & Shadows. The box set was released on April 26, 2024, and includes a journal written by McCreary which details the creation of the episode's score. All music was composed by Bear McCreary:

Track listing
No.	Title	Length
1.	"This Wandering Day" (featuring Megan Richards)	2:09
2.	"The Perils of Migration"	6:19
3.	"Númenor Prepares"	7:18
4.	"Wolves"	5:29
5.	"The Fading Light"	8:13
6.	"The Saboteur"	7:22
7.	"Only Blood Can Bind"	4:03
8.	"Destined for the Darkness"	4:42
9.	"The Confession and Sailing Into the Dawn"	7:14
10.	"This Wandering Day" (featuring Janet Roddick)	2:19
Total length:		55:08

== Release ==
"Partings" premiered on the streaming service Amazon Prime Video on September 23, 2022. It was released at the same time around the world, in more than 240 countries and territories. For two weeks leading up to the second season's premiere on August 29, 2024, the first season was made available for free on the streaming service Samsung TV Plus in the US, Canada, Brazil, the United Kingdom, and Germany.

Ahead of the third season's release in November 2026, a home media release for the first two seasons was announced. Each release features the eight episodes of the respective season along with behind-the-scenes content. They were released on 4K Ultra HD, Blu-ray, and DVD on November 3, and in limited edition 4K UHD SteelBook—with Amazon exclusive collectable art cards—on December 1.

== Reception ==
=== Viewership ===
Whip Media, which tracks viewership data for the 21 million worldwide users of its TV Time app, calculated that for the week ending September 25, two days after the episode's debut, The Rings of Power was the fifth-highest original streaming series for US viewership. Nielsen Media Research, which records streaming viewership on US television screens, estimated that the series was watched for 977 million minutes during the week ending September 25. This placed it fourth on the company's list of top streaming series and films. Fellow fantasy series House of the Dragon was third for the week, the first time it was ahead of The Rings of Power on the chart. Parrot Analytics determines audience "demand expressions" based on various data sources, including social media activity and comments on rating platforms. During the week ending September 30, the company calculated that The Rings of Power was 29.3 times more in demand than the average US streaming series, placing it ninth on the company's top 10 list for the week.

=== Critical response ===
On review aggregator Rotten Tomatoes, 73% of 30 critics gave the episode a positive review and the average of rated reviews was 7.1 out of 10. The critics consensus reads, "The scenery is gorgeous as ever and the nods to Tolkien lore still dense, but The Rings of Power's momentum feels stuck as a Harfoot's caravan in the mud."

== Companion media ==
An episode of the official aftershow Deadline's Inside the Ring: LOTR: The Rings of Power for "Partings" was released on September 24, 2022. Hosted by Deadline Hollywood's Dominic Patten and Anthony D'Alessandro, it features exclusive "footage and insights" for the episode, plus interviews with cast members Clark, Vickers, Addai-Robinson, Gravelle, Horvath, and Wadham, as well as Yip, Doble, and McCreary. On October 14, The Official The Lord of the Rings: The Rings of Power Podcast was released on Amazon Music. Hosted by actress Felicia Day, the fifth episode is dedicated to "Partings" and features McCreary, Payne, and McKay. On November 21, a bonus segment featuring behind-the-scenes footage from the episode was added to Prime Video's X-Ray feature as part of a series titled "The Making of The Rings of Power".
