= Udûn =

Udûn may refer to:

- Udûn, Iron Mountains, also called Utumno, the underground fortress of Morgoth in the Age of the Lamps, before the First Age of Middle-earth in the writings of J. R. R. Tolkien
- Udûn, Mordor, the plain by the Black Gate at the northwestern point of Mordor in the Third Age in the writings of J. R. R. Tolkien
- Udûn (The Lord of the Rings: The Rings of Power), an episode of the television series, named after the plain in Mordor
