= List of The Lord of the Rings: The Rings of Power features =

The Lord of the Rings: The Rings of Power is an American fantasy television series developed by J. D. Payne and Patrick McKay for the streaming service Amazon Prime Video. It is based on J. R. R. Tolkien's history of Middle-earth, primarily material from the appendices of the novel The Lord of the Rings (1954–55). The series is set thousands of years before the novel and depicts the major events of Middle-earth's Second Age. It is produced by Amazon MGM Studios in association with New Line Cinema. The series features adaptations of various locations and objects from Tolkien's writings as well as original creations for the series.

== Background ==
Amazon acquired the global television rights for J. R. R. Tolkien's The Lord of the Rings (1954–55) in November 2017. The company's streaming service, Amazon Prime Video, gave a multi-season commitment to a series based on the novel and its appendices, to be produced by Amazon Studios in association with New Line Cinema and in consultation with the Tolkien Estate. J. D. Payne and Patrick McKay were set as showrunners of the series, titled The Lord of the Rings: The Rings of Power, which is set in the Second Age of Middle-earth, thousands of years before Tolkien's The Hobbit (1937) and The Lord of the Rings.

Illustrator John Howe, one of the main conceptual designers on Peter Jackson's The Lord of the Rings (2001–2003) and The Hobbit (2012–2014) film trilogies, returned to work on the series. He said it would remain faithful to the films' designs. Amazon later clarified that the deal with Tolkien's estate required the company to keep the series distinct from Jackson's films, though the showrunners still intended for it to be visually consistent with them. Amazon confirmed in September 2019 that filming for the first season would take place in New Zealand, where Jackson's films were made. Special effects company Wētā Workshop returned from the films to provide props, weapons, and prosthetics for the first season. In August 2021, Amazon announced that it was moving production of future seasons to the United Kingdom, and other locations in Europe.

== Timeline ==
=== Ages ===
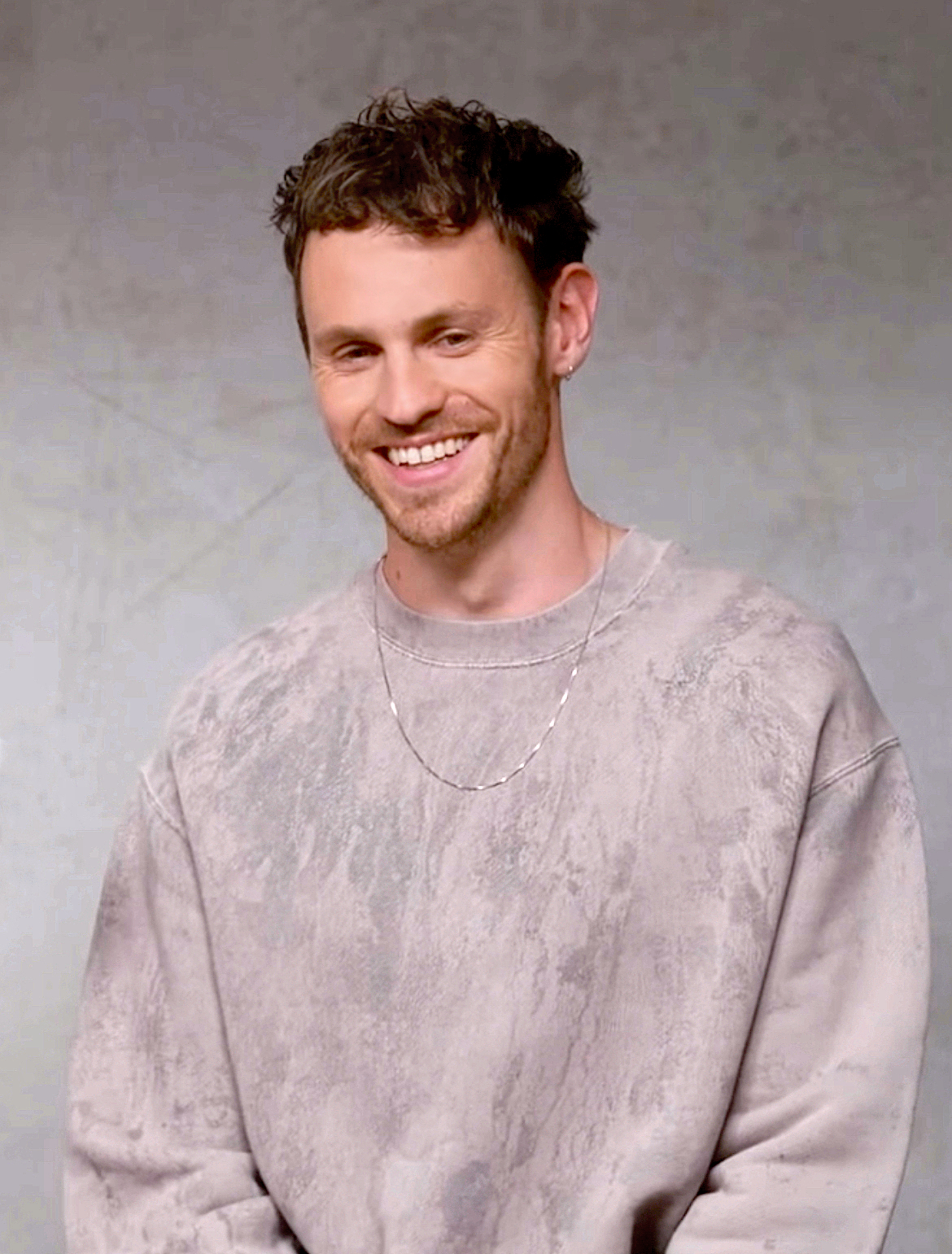
Charlie Vickers stars in the series as Sauron, who emerges as the new Dark Lord during the Second Age.

Tolkien's fictional history is divided into time periods called "Ages", which include:

- The First Age:
  Also known as the "Elder Days", this period is primarily chronicled in the novel The Silmarillion (1977). It begins with the creation of the world of Arda, the appearance of races like Elves and Men, and their struggles against the Dark Lord Morgoth. His servant Sauron is also introduced. The First Age ends with the War of Wrath, in which Morgoth is defeated. The series begins with a recap of the First Age which the showrunners called a high-level summary. They felt Tolkien fans would be able to fill in the gaps with their own knowledge.
- The Second Age:
  The series' primary setting, which begins after the War of Wrath and shows Sauron becoming the new Dark Lord. The Second Age is more than three thousand years long in Tolkien's writings, but the showrunners decided to condense this so all of the key events take place around the same time. This was due to concerns that human characters would be frequently dying due to their relatively short lifespans, and that key humans from the end of the Second Age would not be introduced until late in the series. The Tolkien estate approved this change.
- The Third Age: The events of The Hobbit and The Lord of the Rings take place around three thousand years into the Third Age, and end with the beginning of the Fourth Age.

=== Major events ===
The showrunners structured the series so each season would be built around several "major tentpole moments" from Tolkien's history of the Second Age:

- The first season ends with Sauron's emergence and the first Rings of Power, for the Elves, being forged.
- Rings for Dwarves and Men are forged in the second season, which ends with the Siege of Eregion.
- The third season takes place during the "War of the Elves and Sauron", and includes the forging of the ruling One Ring.
- The fall of the island kingdom of Númenor and the last alliance between Elves and Men will also be covered by the series.

== Peoples and creatures ==
Different techniques were used to differentiate the cultures of Middle-earth in the series. A design language for each culture was defined, dialect coach Leith McPherson used different dialects, and calligrapher Daniel Reeve used different scripts and writing systems. Composer Bear McCreary wrote a main theme for each culture and then created individual character themes that relate to their culture's music in different ways.

=== Ainur ===
- Valar: The equivalent of gods in Tolkien's mythology. Valar who are mentioned in the series include the Dark Lord Morgoth and Aule, the Vala of smithing who created the Dwarves.
- Maiar: Angelic beings that serve the Valar. They can take on different forms. Maiar who are seen in the series include Sauron, Wizards, who take on the appearance of Men, and the demonic Balrog.

=== Free peoples ===
- Elves:
  The main Elves in the series are the Noldor (High Elves) who traveled from the Undying Lands of Valinor to fight Morgoth in Middle-earth. Since Morgoth's defeat, their power—the "Light of the Eldar"—has begun to fade. Also included in the series are Silvan Elves (Wood Elves) who never lived in Valinor. Half-Elves, descendants of unions between Elves and Men, can choose between living a mortal or immortal life.
- Dwarves:
  The series depicts the Dwarf realm of Khazad-dûm in its "full glory", compared to the ruins that are seen in the Lord of the Rings films. A key part of this is the discovery of the rare ore mithril in Khazad-dûm's mines. Beard, hair, and facial prosthetics were used to portray male Dwarves. The female Dwarves also have beards, but the producers did not want them to lose their femininity so opted for more subtle facial hair.
- High Men:
  The people of the island kingdom of Númenor are categorized as "High Men". They are descended from Elros, brother of the Half-Elf Elrond, and were originally in close contact with the Elves. Over time, many Númenóreans have turned away from the Elves and grown envious of their immortality. This group become known as the "King's Men" while those who remain friendly with the Elves are known as "The Faithful".
- Halflings:
  The showrunners believed the series would not feel like Middle-earth without the diminutive Hobbits, who do not appear in Tolkien's history until the Third Age. They decided to explore precursors to the Hobbits called Harfoots who live in a nomadic, secretive society. In the second season, a tribe of Hobbit-like Stoors are introduced. Precursors to River-folk like Smeagol from The Lord of the Rings, the Stoors live in Rhûn.
- Ents: Tree-like beings that serve as shepherds of the forests. They were created with visual effects. The series depicts Entwives, who the Ents have lost by the events of The Lord of the Rings.

=== Enslaved peoples ===
- Low Men: The people of the Southlands in Middle-earth are categorized as "Low Men". These include the villagers of Tirharad, who are descended from followers of Morgoth.
- Easterlings: The people who live in the land of Rhûn, in the east of Middle-earth, are known as "Easterlings".
- Orcs:
  The series presents the origins of the Orcs as initially being corrupted Elves, as suggested by Tolkien in The Silmarillion, and explores what this means for them as sentient beings rather than "monsters". This includes depicting female and child Orcs, and expanding on Orc culture. The showrunners wanted to use practical prosthetics for the Orcs where possible.
- Trolls: In addition to Orcs, the armies of the Dark Lords also include large Trolls in the series. They were created with visual effects.

=== Other creatures ===
- Barrow-wights:
  The reanimated corpses of long dead human royalty and noblemen. The Barrow-wights appear during the Third Age in Tolkien's writings, but were not adapted in Jackson's films. The series takes the opportunity to depict them, recreating key details from their roles in The Lord of the Rings. They were depicted through a combination of practical and visual effects, with dancer contortionists hired to portray them on set.
- Eagles: A great eagle sometimes appears at the coronation of a Númenórean monarch, which is interpreted as a sign of approval from the Valar Manwë.
- Fell beasts: Flying creatures that become the steeds of the Nazgûl
- Giant Bats: Giant, blind bats live in the caves of Khazad-dûm. They were created with visual effects, and were designed to look like they evolved in complete darkness.
- Mûmakil: Giant war elephants
- Nameless Things: There are nameless things that live in the deep places of the world, including serpent-like monster that lives in a mud pit.
- Shelob:
  An evil, giant spider. The offspring of Ungoliant, a spider-like evil spirit, Shelob lives in the Dark Forest in Mordor. While the creature's design was based on the New Zealand tunnel-web spider in the Lord of the Rings films, the series' version is based on research into every kind of spider in the world including a South African tarantula that Tolkien was bitten by as a child.
- The Sea Worm: A sea monster that lives in the Sundering Seas. The visual effects team designed it to resemble an eel with the mouth of an anglerfish, and the aggressive movements of a shark.
- Wargs:
  Large wolf-like creatures that serve Orcs. The Wargs in the Lord of the Rings film trilogy were based on hyenas while those seen in the Hobbit film trilogy were more like wolves. For the series, visual effects supervisor Jason Smith asked "What would an Orc's pet giant dog monster be?", leading to a new design inspired by chihuahuas but 5.5 feet (1.7 m) tall with 800 pounds (360 kg) of muscle.
- Wolves: The wolves in this series have a more naturalistic design than Wargs that was influenced by prehistoric warthogs. They were referred to as "Predators" by the production.

== Geography ==
The series is primarily set on the continent of Middle-earth, but the western continent of Aman and the island of Númenor—which lies between the two continents—are also seen.

=== Aman ===
- Valinor:
  Also known as the Undying Lands, Valinor is the original home of the High Elves. It is seen during a flashback to Galadriel's childhood, specifically the city of Tirion which is shown beside the Two Trees of Valinor that lit the world before the Sun and Moon were created. During the Second Age, Elves return home to Valinor by sailing west across the Sundering Seas, where they are greeted by birds, light, and music.

=== Middle-earth ===
Map of Middle-earth in the Second Age, created for the series by illustrator John Howe and overseen by scholar Tom Shippey.

- Forodwaith: The icy, northernmost wastes feature a dark fortress where Sauron and many Orcs fled following Morgoth's defeat.
- Lindon:
  The Elven capital in the west of Middle-earth, ruled over by High King Gil-galad. It was differentiated from the dark forest Elf realm of Lothlórien seen in Jackson's films by using golden birches and aspen trees. Lindon's portrayal in the series was described as a forest in the shape of a cathedral.
  - Grey Havens: Lindon's harbor, where boats are made for Elves who are sailing to Valinor. The Grey Havens are led by the shipwright Círdan.
- Eregion:
  The realm of the Elven-smiths which is ruled by Lord Celebrimbor, himself a master smith. Eregion is where the Rings of Power are forged. The city's design uses more statement architecture than Lindon.
- Rivendell: A valley north of Eregion where a new realm is founded following that realm's fall.
- Khazad-dûm:
  A Dwarven realm under the Misty Mountains, close to Eregion, which is ruled by the line of Durin. The discovery of the rare ore mithril leads to the Dwarves digging too greedily and awakening the Balrog that lives beneath the mines. Khazad-dûm is shown in its full glory during the series.
- Rhovanion:
  The wilderlands east of the Anduin River, where the Harfoots live and follow a migratory path. Places they come across on their journey include the Greenwood forest, which later becomes known as Mirkwood, and the Grey Marshes which are later renamed the Dead Marshes.
- Mordor:
  Initially known as the Southlands and inhabited by Low Men, this area is conquered by Orcs who trigger the eruption of the mountain Orodruin—also known as "Mount Doom"—and create the dark land of Mordor for themselves. This storyline was inspired by references in Tolkien's writings to the volcano going dormant for centuries and then reawakening.
  - Barad-dûr: A tower that Sauron builds in Mordor near Mount Doom.
- Pelargir: An old Númenórean colony near Mordor where refugees from the Southlands seek sanctuary.
- Rhûn: The lands in the far east of Middle-earth that are largely unexplored in Tolkien's works and previous adaptations. The series depicts Rhûn as a barren desert ruled by the Dark Wizard.
- The Sûzat: A land of rolling green hills which the Harfoots' ancestors set out to find. In Tolkien's fictional language of Westron, "Sûza-t" means "The Shire" which is the home of Hobbits in the Third Age.

=== Númenor ===
- Númenor:
  The island kingdom of High Men to the west of Middle-earth, which was not seen in previous Tolkien adaptations. The showrunners said they were obsessed with getting the design right and depicting Númenor as the "greatest kingdom of Men that ever existed". They planned out the entire city, with different architectural layers showing the history of the island as views on the Elves changed over time.

== Objects ==
=== Magical items ===
- Rings of Power:
  Magical rings forged by Sauron and the Elves as part of Sauron's plan to dominate the peoples of Middle-earth. In Tolkien's history, the Elves make rings for themselves after making rings for Men and Dwarves with Sauron. For the series, the showrunners chose to follow the better-known order of the Ring Verse poem from The Lord of the Rings: first the rings for Elves, then those for Dwarves and Men, and finally the One Ring.
  - Rings for Elves:
    Three rings are made for the Elves in the first season, to help reverse the fading power of the Elves in Middle-earth. The season's main storylines were designed to culminate in this moment. In the second season, these rings are distributed: Narya, the ring of fire, is given to Círdan; Nenya, the ring of water, is given to Galadriel; and Vilya, the ring of air, is given to Gil-galad.
  - Rings for Dwarves:
    Seven rings are made for the Dwarves in the second season, to help save the realm of Khazad-dûm. King Durin III uses one of these rings to make the kingdom prosperous again, but he becomes corrupted by the ring due to Sauron's influence and becomes too greedy, leading to his death at the hands of the Balrog.
  - Rings for Men:
    Nine rings are made for Men in the second season. These are destined to corrupt their owners into the "Nazgûl" or "Ringwraiths"; the series depicts their origins before this transformation, when they are called "Nazgnagôl" which the writers derived from Tolkien's Black Speech as a translation for "Ring-servants".
  - The One Ring: Sauron's ruling ring, that allows him to dominate all the others and gain power over the peoples of Middle-earth.
- Mithril:
  A powerful ore discovered in Khazad-dûm. A new origin was invented for the series, where mithril is created from one of the Silmarils—powerful jewels from the First Age. This is recited as "The Song of the Roots of Hithaeglir" in the fifth episode. Mithril is used to make the Rings of Power. Physical props were made from a translucent material that was gilded with gun bluing and augmented with visual effects.
- Palantír:
  A crystal ball-like seeing stone that shows visions of the future. The showrunners said there was ambiguity about the abilities of the palantíri in Tolkien's works; they are primarily used to communicate across great distances, but there are also indications that they can be used to communicate across time. When the palantír is used, a glass or crystal cracking effect is added by the visual effects team to transition to the visions.
- Morgoth's crown:
  A spiked iron crown that was once worn by Morgoth, and is adjusted to fit Sauron. It has the power to destroy Sauron's physical body. The presence of this crown in the series is a departure from The Silmarillion, which describes Morgoth's crown being fashioned into a collar which Morgoth is wearing when he is cast out into the void.

=== Weapons ===
- Finrod's dagger: Galadriel inherits a dagger from her brother Finrod which is decorated with depictions of the Two Trees of Valinor. The dagger is used to make the Elven rings.
- The broken hilt:
  The broken hilt of a black sword that was given by Sauron to the Low Men of the Southlands. It is covered in barbs and spikes that are meant to draw the blood of the person holding it and channel it down the hilt, giving it power to reform itself. The reformed sword is revealed to be a key that unlocks a dam, sending water through the Southlands to trigger the eruption of Mount Doom.
- Narsil: A sword that is passed to Elendil and his descendants. It has a similar design to its appearance in Jackson's films.
