= Thusitha Jayasundera =

Sri Lankan actress

- Born: 1971 (age 54–55); Sri Lanka
- Occupation: Actress
- Spouse: Simon Allen (2002–present)

Thusitha Jayasundera (born 1971) is a Sri Lankan actress who lives in the United Kingdom. She attended an all-girls school run by Australian missionaries, and graduated from the Royal Academy of Dramatic Art in 1993.

Jayasundera played Tushura 'Tash' Bandara in the BBC hospital drama Holby City for three years from December 1999 to June 2002. She played DS Ramani De Costa in the ITV police drama The Bill from 2003 to 2006, and DS Ayesha Masood in the BBC series Silent Witness.

She appeared in the National Theatre adaptation of Michael Morpurgo's novel, War Horse. In 2009 she appeared in the play Dreams of Violence by Stella Feehily for Out of Joint and Soho Theatre.

In 2015, she played Ros Mahendra in the BBC drama Doctor Foster. On 17 March 2019, Jayasundera appeared in Midsomer Murders in the episode "Death of the Small Coppers".

In December 2020, she was cast in the Amazon Prime Video series The Lord of the Rings: The Rings of Power, which premiered on 2 September 2022.
