= Samsung TV Plus =

TV streaming network owned by Samsung

- Company type: Subsidiary
- Website type: Live TV
- Owner: Samsung Electronics
- Website: samsungtvplus.com
- Advertising: Supported
- Registration: Required
- Launched: August 23, 2015; 11 years ago

Samsung TV Plus is a free ad-supported streaming television (FAST) service owned by Samsung Electronics that was introduced in 2015. The platform was designed to provide free, live streaming content for users with Samsung devices.

As of 2022, the service was available in 24 countries and is viewable within a multitude of Samsung products due to its integration with the Tizen operating system. Samsung TV Plus was one of the five most-used apps on the company's smart TVs in September 2020.

== Programming ==
The service currently has over 700+ live channels, each grouped into various categories. Among its channels are exclusive channels devoted to the David Letterman and Conan O'Brien libraries.

== Availability ==
Samsung TV Plus has been pre-installed on all Samsung TVs since 2016. Since April 2021, the service has also been available on Samsung mobile devices (available from the Galaxy Store) and Smart monitors. Select Family Hub refrigerators can also be connected to Samsung TV Plus in the U.S. and Korea.

In January 2023, Samsung announced it was rolling out Samsung TV Plus onto non-Samsung TVs in the form of an installable app, specifically in an integration with TCL TVs.

In June 2024, Samsung began rolling out Samsung TV Plus across the Middle East and parts of Southeast Asia.

== Sports ==
Samsung TV Plus offers free live and on-demand sports content across dedicated FAST (Free Ad-Supported Television) channels. Its programming spans a range of major leagues and organizations, including the NHL, MLB, NBA, NFL, UFC, NASCAR, Formula 1, PGA Tour, and AHL—delivered through channels like NFL Channel, MLB FAST, NBA FAST Channel, Victory+ Anaheim, Victory+ Dallas, and the Formula 1 Channel.

== See also ==
- Samsung
- Rakuten TV
