= Mondo (American company) =

American screen printed posters company

- Founded: 2004; 22 years ago
- Founders: Tim League; Kier-La Janisse; Lester Smolenski; Rob Jones; Mitch Putnam
- Headquarters: Austin, Texas, United States
- Parent: Alamo Drafthouse Cinema (2004–2022); Funko (2022–2023)
- Website: mondoshop.com

Mondo is an American company known for releasing limited edition screen printed posters for films, television shows, and comics, as well as vinyl movie soundtracks, clothing and apparel, toys, and re-issues of VHS releases. Founded in 2004 as Mondo Tees, the company is a former subsidiary of the Alamo Drafthouse Cinema chain in Austin, Texas, and currently hosts a permanent gallery space there which features original artwork and custom posters.

In June 2022, Funko announced that it had acquired Mondo. Nearly a year later on 24 March 2023, Funko announced staff layoffs of a portion of the company, including co-founders Rob Jones and Mitch Putnam, as well as announcing the discontinuation of some Mondo products.

== History ==
In 2001, Alamo Drafthouse Cinema founder Tim League was visiting Kier-La Janisse in Vancouver for the CineMuerte Film Festival. League visited a vintage iron-on T-shirt shop called Bang-On, and years later, pitched the idea of a T-shirt store as a branch of the Drafthouse chain to Janisse and her boyfriend Lester Smolenski. With the help of graphic designs from Smolenski, who worked for Bang-On, the offshoot Mondo Tees was established in 2004.

In spring 2004, Mondo Tees collaborated with Graham Williams of the Austin club Emo's for a summer outdoor film and music festival called Cinemania, wherein the Drafthouse booked the screenings and Emo's booked the live music shows. Ticket sales failed to reach even one thousand, so to prevent the festival from being a financial failure, it was moved indoors and a line of custom posters were created to promote the event. Williams hired freelance designer Rob Jones, who had created posters for Emo's performances in the past, and Jones produced posters highlighting the planned screenings of Better Off Dead, Foxy Brown, and The Warriors.

Mondo Tees continued working with Jones for the Quentin Tarantino Film Festival in 2006, and Jones introduced the founders to artists such as Jay Ryan, Todd Slater, and Tyler Stout, and the company shifted its focus to posters more than T-shirts. Jones is currently a creative director at Mondo.

Creative director Justin Ishmael and co-founder Mitch Putnam helped elevate the business model to secure licensing from companies like Lucasfilm and The Walt Disney Company for more well-known properties like Star Wars and the Marvel Cinematic Universe. Ishmael, who joined the company in 2009, left to pursue other opportunities in 2015.

In 2017, in collaboration with USAopoly's Project Raygun division, Mondo released their first board game: The Thing: Infection at Outpost 31, based on the 1982 film The Thing.

Artists who have created posters with Mondo include Becky Cloonan, Laurent Durieux, Olly Moss, Gary Pullin, Matthew Woodson, Jay Shaw, Matt Taylor, Kevin Tong, Tom Whalen, Sam Wolfe Connelly, and Jock.

In June 2022, Funko announced that it had acquired Mondo. On March 24 2023, Funko laid off Mondo co-founders Mitch Putnam and Rob Jones and announced changes to its poster printing division, a decision that was met with such negative reception by the public and Mondo-affiliated artists that Funko CEO Brian Mariotti released a statement on March 30, 2023 attempting to clarify Funko's plans for Mondo's future.

== Growth and reception ==
Posters released by Mondo have been added to the movie poster archive of the Academy of Motion Picture Arts and Sciences, as well as included in the catalog of Heritage Auctions. In 2011, Mondo collaborated with Paramount Pictures on custom posters for Transformers: Dark of the Moon and Captain America: The First Avenger. When Mondo released a custom poster for the film Pan's Labyrinth, director Guillermo del Toro stated, "I felt completely overwhelmed and happy. I'm a huge fan of their posters. They involved me in approving every step of the design. They took some of my notes to heart, but mostly my notes were 'Wow!'".

Beyond posters, Mondo and its sister label Death Waltz have received positive reception for their soundtrack releases, which feature custom cover art, inner art, and special designs on the vinyl records themselves.

In 2022, the exhibit Mondo: The Front Runner of Film Poster was the ninth in a series of film poster exhibitions held jointly by the National Film Archive of Japan and the National Museum of Modern Art, Kyoto. The exhibition presented 71 posters from the beginning of Mondo through 2021.

=== MondoCon ===
MondoCon is an annual festival held in Austin that showcases the artwork of Mondo and features exclusive collectibles, panels, and special screenings with filmmakers and artists. The event has been called "the world's coolest poster convention" and "the venerable kingpin of the artisanal movie poster game".
