= Where the Stars are Strange =

- The Lord of the Rings: The Rings of Power episode
- Cover art for the episode's soundtrack album
- Episode no.: Season 2 Episode 2
- Directed by: Charlotte Brändström; Louise Hooper
- Written by: Jason Cahill
- Cinematography by: Alex Disenhof; Laurie Rose
- Editing by: Kate Baird
- Original release date: August 29, 2024
- Running time: 63 minutes

Additional cast
- Amelia Kenworthy as Mirdania; Kevin Eldon as Narvi; Ben Daniels as Círdan; Akshay Khanna as the Commander of the West; Freddie Bowerman as the Commander of the East; Jeany Spark as the Commander of the South; Jamie Bisping as Calenwë; Zates Atour as Brânk; Bridie Sisson as the Dweller; Arkie Reece as Kilta; Laura Jane Matthewson as Revna; Rachel Payne as Brenna; Stuart Bowman as Barduk

Episode chronology
← Previous "Elven Kings Under the Sky"	Next → "The Eagle and the Sceptre"
- The Lord of the Rings: The Rings of Power season 2

"Where the Stars are Strange" is the second episode of the second season of the American fantasy television series The Lord of the Rings: The Rings of Power, which is based on J. R. R. Tolkien's history of Middle-earth. It was written by Jason Cahill and directed by Charlotte Brändström and Louise Hooper.

The series is set thousands of years before Tolkien's novel The Lord of the Rings (1954–55), during the Second Age of Middle-earth. Filming for the second season took place in the United Kingdom and on location in the Canary Islands from October 2022 to June 2023.

"Where the Stars are Strange" premiered on the streaming service Amazon Prime Video on August 29, 2024, with the season's first and third episodes. There was a significant drop in viewership from the first season's premiere episodes, but viewership was still estimated to be high. This episode received generally positive reviews, with particular praise going to the Dwarven storyline.

== Background ==
The Lord of the Rings: The Rings of Power is based on J. R. R. Tolkien's history of Middle-earth. It is set thousands of years before his novels The Hobbit (1937) and The Lord of the Rings (1954–55). While it is contractually not a continuation of Peter Jackson's The Lord of the Rings (2001–2003) and The Hobbit (2012–2014) film trilogies, it is intended to be visually consistent with them. J. D. Payne and Patrick McKay were hired to develop the series and serve as its showrunners. Production moved from New Zealand to the United Kingdom starting with the second season, which was directed by Charlotte Brändström, Sanaa Hamri, and Louise Hooper.

The series covers the major events of Middle-earth's Second Age. Amazon did not acquire the rights to Tolkien's main Second Age writings, so the writers identified references to the period in The Hobbit, The Lord of the Rings, and the latter's appendices, and created a story that bridges those passages. The Second Age begins after the defeat of the "Dark Lord" Morgoth, when his army of Orcs are scattered and his lieutenant Sauron is in hiding. The large cast of characters includes Elves, Dwarves, Men, and Harfoots, the last being precursors to the diminutive Hobbits from The Hobbit and The Lord of the Rings. In the first season, Sauron disguises himself as the human "Halbrand" and deceives the Elves into creating three Rings of Power, while the Orcs use the eruption of Mount Doom to create their own realm, the dark land of Mordor.

== Plot ==
Seismic activity from Mount Doom causes an earthquake in the Dwarven realm of Khazad-dûm. Some of their infrastructure is destroyed, shutting off their access to sunlight which leads to the withering of their crops. King Durin III and his son, Prince Durin IV, refuse to reconcile following Durin IV's choice to help the Elves mine for the rare ore mithril. Durin IV's wife, Disa, learns that her ability to sing to the mountains cannot help them.

The Elf Galadriel has a vision of Elf-smith Celebrimbor reciting a poem about the Rings of Power while he is killed by vines that she planted. She later tells High King Gil-galad that she thinks Sauron may be with Celebrimbor in Eregion and asks to go there. Gil-galad, who has also had visions while wearing a Ring of Power, does not want to send Galadriel alone since she was deceived by Sauron previously. Galadriel asks Elrond to accompany her, but he refuses due to her decision to wear one of the rings. The wise Elf Círdan convinces Elrond that it would be better to guide his friends, and to Galadriel's surprise Elrond is made the leader of her company.

At Caras Gaer in the eastern land of Rhûn, a Dark Wizard is displeased with one of his acolytes, the Dweller, who failed to capture the Stranger; he sends a group of riders to find him. The Stranger and Harfoots Nori Brandyfoot and Poppy Proudfellow travel through a desert to avoid detection. They run out of food and water, and the Stranger collapses from dehydration. The Harfoots find a well and revive him, but accidentally alert the riders to their location. Finding a staff that he recognizes from his dreams, the Stranger summons a sandstorm which drives the riders off. He loses control, the staff disintegrates, and the storm sweeps Nori and Poppy away.

Sauron poses as Halbrand at the gates of Eregion and refuses to leave. Celebrimbor awaits news from the Elf-capital Lindon, not knowing that Gil-galad's messengers were killed on their way to Eregion. Despite promising Galadriel that he would never talk to Halbrand again, Celebrimbor does not know that he is Sauron and eventually decides to turn Halbrand away personally. Sauron convinces Celebrimbor that he is Annatar, the "Lord of Gifts", an emissary from the Valar who has come to help make more Rings of Power for Dwarves and Men.

== Production ==
=== Writing ===
"Where the Stars are Strange" was written by Jason Cahill. The title references a line from Tolkien's The Lord of the Rings in which the character Aragorn says he has traveled to "the far countries of Rhûn and Harad where the stars are strange".

=== Casting ===
The season's cast includes Robert Aramayo as Elrond, Owain Arthur as Durin IV, Morfydd Clark as Galadriel, Charles Edwards as Celebrimbor, Ciarán Hinds as the Dark Wizard, Markella Kavenagh as Elanor "Nori" Brandyfoot, Peter Mullan as Durin III, Sophia Nomvete as Disa, Megan Richards as Poppy Proudfellow, Charlie Vickers as Sauron, Benjamin Walker as Gil-galad, and Daniel Weyman as the Stranger. Also starring in the episode are Amelia Kenworthy as Mirdania, Kevin Eldon as Narvi, Ben Daniels as Círdan, Akshay Khanna as the Commander of the West, Freddie Bowerman as the Commander of the East, Jeany Spark as the Commander of the South, Jamie Bisping as Calenwë, Zates Atour as Brânk, Bridie Sisson as the Dweller, Arkie Reece as Kilta, Laura Jane Matthewson as Revna, Rachel Payne as Brenna, and Stuart Bowman as Barduk.

=== Filming ===
Filming for the season began on October 3, 2022, under the working title LBP. Episodes were shot simultaneously based on the availability of locations and sets. Brändström and Hooper directed "Where the Stars are Strange". Alex Disenhof was the cinematographer for Brändström's episodes, returning from the first season, with Laurie Rose working on Hooper's episodes. The production wrapped in early June 2023.

=== Visual effects ===
Visual effects for the episode were created by Outpost VFX, Industrial Light & Magic (ILM), The Yard VFX, DNEG, Rodeo FX, Midas VFX, Monsters Aliens Robots Zombies, Untold Studios, Atomic Arts, and Cantina Creative. The different vendors were overseen by visual effects supervisor Jason Smith.

=== Music ===
The Lord of the Rings: The Rings of Power (Season Two, Episode Two: Where the Stars are Strange – Amazon Original Series Soundtrack)

Film score by Bear McCreary
- Released: August 29, 2024
- Genres: Orchestra; choir; world
- Length: 40:08
- Languages: English; Constructed languages
- Labels: Amazon; Mutant

Bear McCreary chronology
Elven Kings Under the Sky (2024)	Where the Stars are Strange (2024)	The Eagle and the Sceptre (2024)

A soundtrack album featuring composer Bear McCreary's score for the episode was released digitally on the streaming service Amazon Music on August 29, 2024. McCreary said the series' episodic albums contained "virtually every second of score" from their respective episodes. It was added to other music streaming services after the full second season was released. A CD featuring the episode's music is included in a limited edition box set collection for the season from Mutant and McCreary's label Sparks & Shadows. The box set was announced in October 2025, and includes a journal written by McCreary which details the creation of the episode's score. All music was composed by Bear McCreary:

Track listing
No.	Title	Length
1.	"Catastrophe at Khazad-dûm"	2:14
2.	"Glimpses of the Unseen World"	5:33
3.	"Caras Gaer" (featuring the Mystery of the Bulgarian Voices)	4:38
4.	"The Gaudrim"	3:44
5.	"Despair Under the Mountain" (featuring Sophia Nomvete)	4:41
6.	"Before Darkness Blinds Us All"	8:05
7.	"My Name Is Not Halbrand"	9:34
8.	"Invitation to Eregion"	1:39
Total length:		40:08

== Release ==
The season's first three episodes premiered on the streaming service Amazon Prime Video on August 29, 2024. They were released at the same time around the world, in more than 240 countries and territories. Ahead of the third season's release in November 2026, a home media release for the first two seasons was announced. Each release features the eight episodes of the respective season along with behind-the-scenes content. They were released on 4K Ultra HD, Blu-ray, and DVD on November 3, and in limited edition 4K UHD SteelBook—with Amazon exclusive collectable art cards—on December 1.

== Reception ==
=== Viewership ===
Luminate, which gathers viewership data from smart TVs, said the first three episodes of the season were watched for 63.2 million minutes on their first day of release, and for 553.5 million minutes over the following four-day Labor Day weekend. Whip Media, which tracks viewership data for the 25 million worldwide users of its TV Time app, listed the series second—behind Hulu's Only Murders in the Building—on its US streaming chart for the week ending September 1. Nielsen Media Research, which records streaming viewership on US television screens, estimated that The Rings of Power had 1.02 billion minutes viewed in the week ending September 1. Around 70 percent of those were for the first three episodes. It was the top original streaming series of the week and second overall behind Prison Break. The number was 19 percent lower than Nielsen's calculation for the opening week of the first season (1.25 billion minutes). Samba TV, which also gathers viewership data from smart TVs, listed the series seventh on its chart of top streaming programs for the week ending September 1.

=== Critical response ===
On review aggregator Rotten Tomatoes, 92% of 13 critics gave the episode a positive review and the average of rated reviews was 7.4 out of 10.

Keith Phipps at Vulture gave the episode three stars out of five. He said it is more set-up for the season but "the plot also thickened" with more details on Sauron's plans and the Rhûn storyline. Phipps highlighted the Khazad-dûm scenes, saying they struck "a nice balance between high seriousness and earthiness" and particularly praising the performances of Arthur and Nomvete. He added that the series was finding interesting ways to tell its stories despite their endings being known to the audience. Arezou Amin of Collider gave the episode 7 out of 10 and said its character dynamics overcame some unbalanced pacing. She said the relationship between Galadriel and Elrond was one of the strongest in the series, but the focus on the Elves meant the other storylines did not have enough time to "flourish". Amin also praised the relationship between Durin IV and Disa.

Writing for Gizmodo, James Whitbrook said the episode did a "noble job" catching up the audience on key plotlines from the first season, and highlighted the relationship between the Durins. He said their family drama was where the series "really finds heart". Whitbrook said Sauron's transformation into Annatar was both horrifying and awesome, and said it was fun to watch him begin to manipulate Celebrimbor even though it was not yet clear "how much Rings of Power can really wring out" of that storyline. Leon Miller at Polygon felt the episode was "more of the same" from the first season, with some changes from Tolkien's lore that worked in context and others that did not. He welcomed the addition of Ciarán Hinds as the Dark Wizard but felt the Stranger's story continued to be uninteresting. Miller also had negative thoughts about the Khazad-dûm storyline, feeling its "toothless father-son feud" was beneath the works of Tolkien. Despite this, he found the episode to be "inexplicably watchable" and thought the same would hold true for all but the "most die-hard Tolkien truthers".

=== Accolades ===
Charlie Vickers was named an honorable mention for TVLine's "Performer of the Week" for the week of August 26, 2024, for his performance in this episode. The site highlighted the scenes where Sauron is in disguise, saying "it was the gleam in his eyes, the small smiles and the casual way he held himself that took his performance to another level. Here, Vickers again proved he's the right man to bring Sauron to life."

== Companion media ==
An episode of the aftershow Inside The Rings of Power for "Where the Stars are Strange" was released on August 29, 2024. It features actress Felicia Day, the host of The Official The Lord of the Rings: The Rings of Power Podcast, interviewing the showrunners and cast members Edwards, Nomvete, and Arthur about the making of the episode, with some behind-the-scenes footage.
