= Eldest (The Lord of the Rings: The Rings of Power) =

- The Lord of the Rings: The Rings of Power episode
- Cover art for the episode's soundtrack album
- Episode no.: Season 2 Episode 4
- Directed by: Louise Hooper; Sanaa Hamri
- Written by: Glenise Mullins
- Cinematography by: Laurie Rose; Jean-Philippe Gossart
- Editing by: Joel Skinner
- Original release date: September 5, 2024
- Running time: 60 minutes

Additional cast
- Rory Kinnear as Tom Bombadil; Sam Hazeldine as Adar; Jim Broadbent as the voice of Snaggleroot; Olivia Williams as the voice of Winterbloom; Calam Lynch as Camnir; Gavi Singh Chera as Merimac; Tanya Moodie as Gundabale Earthauler; Nia Towle as Estrid; Charlie Rix as Vorohil; Selina Lo as Rían; Oliver Alvin-Wilson as Daemor; Zates Atour as Brânk; Peter Landi as Marmadas; Bridie Sisson as the Dweller; Raya Yarbrough as the voice of Goldberry; Robert Strange as Snaghûl; Thomas Gilbey as Drúv; Gabriel Akuwudike as Hagen; Murray McArthur as Ammred; Kai Martin as Borzag

Episode chronology
← Previous "The Eagle and the Sceptre"	Next → "Halls of Stone"
- The Lord of the Rings: The Rings of Power season 2

"Eldest" is the fourth episode of the second season of the American fantasy television series The Lord of the Rings: The Rings of Power, which is based on J. R. R. Tolkien's history of Middle-earth. It was written by Glenise Mullins and directed by Louise Hooper and Sanaa Hamri.

The series is set thousands of years before Tolkien's novel The Lord of the Rings (1954–55), during the Second Age of Middle-earth. This episode introduces the character Tom Bombadil (Rory Kinnear). Filming for the second season took place in the United Kingdom and on location in the Canary Islands from October 2022 to June 2023.

"Eldest" premiered on the streaming service Amazon Prime Video on September 5, 2024. It was estimated to have high viewership and received generally positive reviews, though the depiction of Tom Bombadil and other Tolkien characters received mixed responses. The episode was nominated at the 23rd Visual Effects Society Awards.

== Background ==
The Lord of the Rings: The Rings of Power is based on J. R. R. Tolkien's history of Middle-earth. It is set thousands of years before his novels The Hobbit (1937) and The Lord of the Rings (1954–55). While it is contractually not a continuation of Peter Jackson's The Lord of the Rings (2001–2003) and The Hobbit (2012–2014) film trilogies, it is intended to be visually consistent with them. J. D. Payne and Patrick McKay were hired to develop the series and serve as its showrunners. Production moved from New Zealand to the United Kingdom starting with the second season, which was directed by Charlotte Brändström, Sanaa Hamri, and Louise Hooper.

The series covers the major events of Middle-earth's Second Age. Amazon did not acquire the rights to Tolkien's main Second Age writings, so the writers identified references to the period in The Hobbit, The Lord of the Rings, and the latter's appendices, and created a story that bridges those passages. The Second Age begins after the defeat of the "Dark Lord" Morgoth, when his army of Orcs are scattered and his lieutenant Sauron is in hiding. The large cast of characters includes Elves, Dwarves, Men, and Harfoots, the last being precursors to the diminutive Hobbits from The Hobbit and The Lord of the Rings. In the first season, Sauron disguises himself as the human "Halbrand" and deceives the Elves into creating three Rings of Power, while the Orcs use the eruption of Mount Doom to create their own realm, the dark land of Mordor.

== Plot ==
A company of Elves, including Elrond and Galadriel, set out for Eregion from Lindon. They find a bridge that has been destroyed by lightning and are forced to take a different path. Galadriel's Ring of Power gives her a vision that danger lies on their new path, but Elrond dismisses the warning out of distrust for the ring.

The Stranger is separated from his Harfoot companions, Nori Brandyfoot and Poppy Proudfellow, in the eastern desert of Rhûn. He comes across the mysterious Tom Bombadil, who rescues the Stranger from being consumed by a tree. Tom says he is "eldest" and remembers a time before there were stars. He came to Rhûn after hearing that the once beautiful land is now a wasteland ruled over by a Dark Wizard. Tom says the Stranger has been tasked with stopping both the Dark Wizard and Sauron.

Nori and Poppy meet a community of halflings called Stoors who live in a desert canyon. Stoor leader Gundabale Earthauler wants to turn them away because they are being hunted by the Dark Wizard's Gaudrim riders, but she realizes that the Harfoots are descended from a Stoor who left in search of the Sûzat, a place of green hills that he dreamed could be the home of halflings. Two riders come searching for the Harfoots and Gundabale turns them away.

Elf Arondir and the Men of Pelargir search for the missing Theo. Arondir deduces that Estrid is one of the Wild Men, to Isildur's dismay. She earns back some trust when she saves Isildur and Arondir from a mud pit inhabited by a nameless creature. They are confronted by two tree-like Ents, who captured Theo and some Wild Men in retribution for the felling of trees by Wild Men and an army of Orcs. Arondir promises to protect the forest and the Ents free their prisoners; one of the Wild Men is Hagen, Estrid's betrothed. Arondir charges Theo with leading the Men of Pelargir and follows the Orcs' trail.

The Elvish company fight off Barrow-wights—spirits inhabiting the corpses of long-dead humans—and find the Orc army. Camnir is hit by an Orc arrow, but is healed by Galadriel's ring. She gives the ring to Elrond and tells the company to return to Lindon and warn High King Gil-galad of the Orcs. She stays to hold them off and is captured by Orc leader Adar.

== Production ==
=== Writing ===
"Eldest" was written by Glenise Mullins.

=== Casting ===
The season's cast includes Robert Aramayo as Elrond, Maxim Baldry as Isildur, Morfydd Clark as Galadriel, Ismael Cruz Córdova as Arondir, Charles Edwards as Celebrimbor, Ciarán Hinds as the Dark Wizard, Markella Kavenagh as Elanor "Nori" Brandyfoot, Tyroe Muhafidin as Theo, Megan Richards as Poppy Proudfellow, Charlie Vickers as Sauron, Benjamin Walker as Gil-galad, and Daniel Weyman as the Stranger. Also starring in the episode are Rory Kinnear as Tom Bombadil, Sam Hazeldine as Adar, Jim Broadbent as the voice of Snaggleroot, Olivia Williams as the voice of Winterbloom, Calam Lynch as Camnir, Gavi Singh Chera as Merimac, Tanya Moodie as Gundabale Earthauler, Nia Towle as Estrid, Charlie Rix as Vorohil, Selina Lo as Rían, Oliver Alvin-Wilson as Daemor, Zates Atour as Brânk, Peter Landi as Marmadas, Bridie Sisson as the Dweller, Raya Yarbrough as the voice of Goldberry, Robert Strange as Snaghûl, Thomas Gilbey as Drúv, Gabriel Akuwudike as Hagen, Murray McArthur as Ammred, and Kai Martin as Borzag. Sisson, Strange, Gilbey, Kaner Scott, and Arthur Griffiths portray Barrow-wights in the episode, and Anthony Skrimshire plays an unnamed Orc.

=== Filming ===
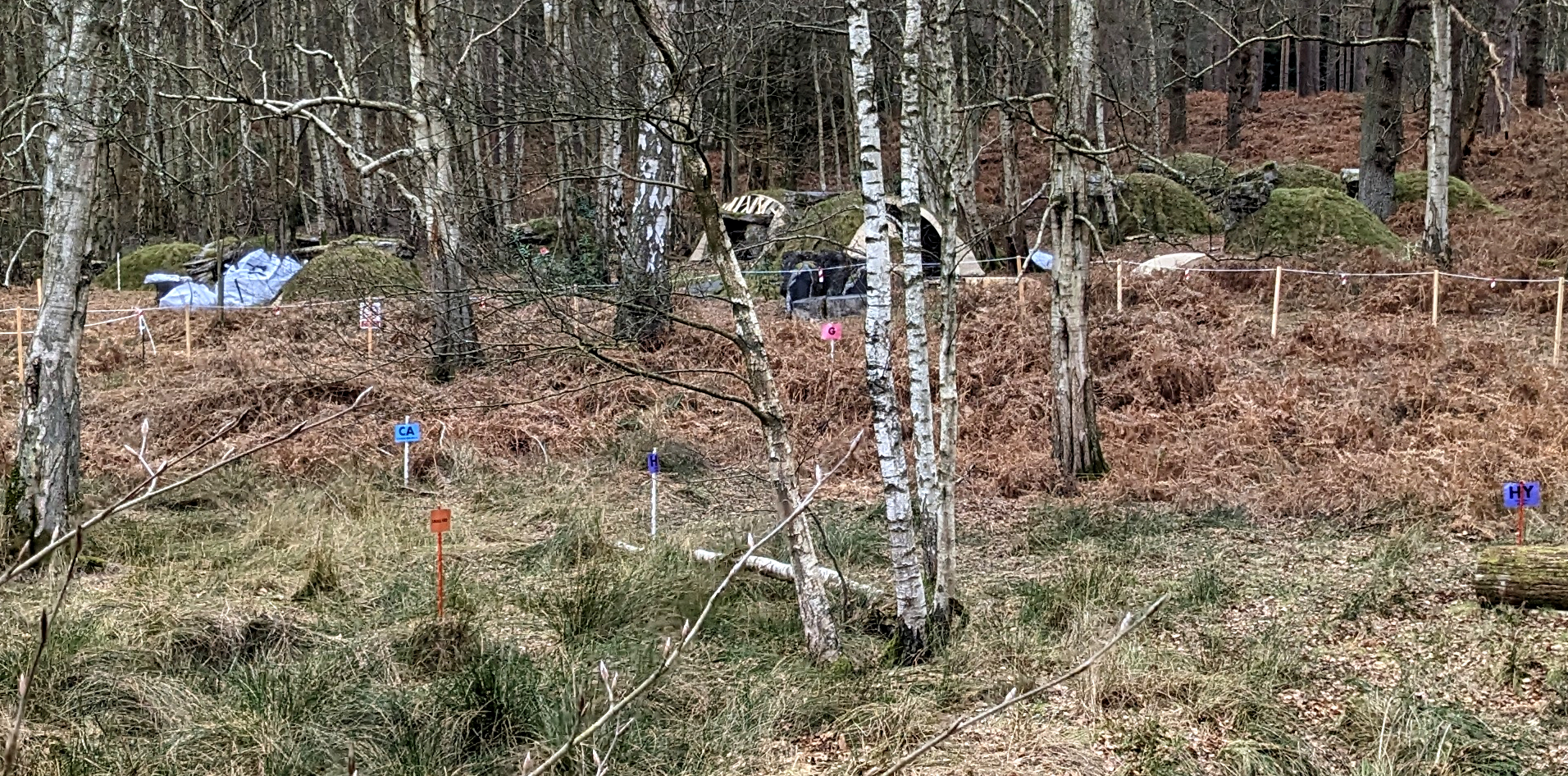
Barrow-downs set built by Wood Pond in South Forest, Windsor Great Park, Berkshire

Filming for the season began on October 3, 2022, under the working title LBP. Episodes were shot simultaneously based on the availability of locations and sets. Hooper and Hamri directed "Eldest". Laurie Rose and Jean-Philippe Gossart were their respective cinematographers. The production wrapped in early June 2023.

=== Visual effects ===
Visual effects for the episode were created by Rodeo FX, Outpost VFX, Industrial Light & Magic (ILM), DNEG, Midas VFX, Monsters Aliens Robots Zombies, Untold Studios, Atomic Arts, and Cantina Creative. The different vendors were overseen by visual effects supervisor Jason Smith.

=== Music ===
The Lord of the Rings: The Rings of Power (Season Two, Episode Four: Eldest – Amazon Original Series Soundtrack)

Film score by Bear McCreary
- Released: September 5, 2024
- Genres: Orchestra; choir; world
- Length: 40:14
- Languages: English; Constructed languages
- Labels: Amazon; Mutant

Bear McCreary chronology
The Eagle and the Sceptre (2024)	Eldest (2024)	Halls of Stone (2024)

A soundtrack album featuring composer Bear McCreary's score for the episode was released digitally on the streaming service Amazon Music on September 5, 2024. McCreary said the series' episodic albums contained "virtually every second of score" from their respective episodes. It was added to other music streaming services after the full second season was released. A CD featuring the episode's music is included in a limited edition box set collection for the season from Mutant and McCreary's label Sparks & Shadows. The box set was announced in October 2025, and includes a journal written by McCreary which details the creation of the episode's score. All music was composed by Bear McCreary:

Track listing
No.	Title	Length
1.	"Elves Embark"	2:28
2.	"Meeting Tom Bombadil"	3:18
3.	"Concerning Stoors"	5:11
4.	"The Dark Wizard"	2:26
5.	"Eldest"	5:36
6.	"Lair of the Barrow-wights"	3:17
7.	"Mud Beast"	2:54
8.	"The Sûzat"	4:24
9.	"Snaggleroot and Winterbloom"	6:52
10.	"Galadriel Stands Alone"	3:48
Total length:		40:14

== Release ==
"Eldest" premiered on the streaming service Amazon Prime Video on September 5, 2024. It was released at the same time around the world, in more than 240 countries and territories. Ahead of the third season's release in November 2026, a home media release for the first two seasons was announced. Each release features the eight episodes of the respective season along with behind-the-scenes content. They were released on 4K Ultra HD, Blu-ray, and DVD on November 3, and in limited edition 4K UHD SteelBook—with Amazon exclusive collectable art cards—on December 1.

== Reception ==
=== Viewership ===
Luminate, which gathers viewership data from smart TVs, said the series was watched for 764.7 million minutes in the week ending September 5. This placed it second on the company's chart behind Netflix's Worst Ex Ever and was described as a "soft start" for the season considering it included several days of viewership for the first three episodes in addition to the fourth episode's debut. Whip Media, which tracks viewership data for the 25 million worldwide users of its TV Time app, again listed the series second—behind Hulu's Only Murders in the Building—on its US streaming chart for the week ending September 8. Nielsen Media Research, which records streaming viewership on US television screens, estimated that The Rings of Power had 1.02 billion minutes viewed in the week ending September 8. This was even with the previous week and made it the second biggest original streaming series of the week behind Netflix's The Perfect Couple. Samba TV, which also gathers viewership data from smart TVs, listed the series fifth on its chart of top streaming programs for the week ending September 8.

=== Critical response ===
On review aggregator Rotten Tomatoes, 92% of 12 critics gave the episode a positive review and the average of rated reviews was 6.8 out of 10.

Reviewing the episode for Polygon, Leon Miller said it was the most focused and satisfying of the season so far. He discussed the theme of mistrust in the episode's storylines and felt this was most effective in scenes between Galadriel and Elrond, finding the Pelargir storyline to be "a bit bland by comparison". Miller also discussed the episode's "fan service", saying its depictions of Tom Bombadil and Ents were contrary to Tolkien's descriptions and believing they were included "to score cheap clout with viewers". In contrast, he found the Barrow-wight sequence and the mud creature to have genuine purposes in their respective storylines.

James Whitbrook of Gizmodo said the episode did not move the overall story forward much and most of the character work, despite being "perfectly good", just continued the season's theme of all the characters other than Sauron being "really miserable". He thought the impacts of the growing darkness on the natural world—seen in the tree that consumes the Stranger, the Barrow-wights, the mud creature, and the Ents—was more interesting and "maybe the most Tolkien-esque idea that Rings of Power has put on screen". Matt Schimkowitz at The A.V. Club graded the episode a "B". He said some of Kinnear's charm as Tom Bombadil was lost when the character is used to provide exposition for the Stranger, and found the Barrow-wights to be "kind of cool" but also "a touch too Disney. I was getting hints of Haunted Mansion and Pirates Of The Caribbean". Schimkowitz said the Ents were the best of the episode's cameo appearances and provided an opportunity to take a break from the plot when Arondir apologizes to Winterbloom. He felt the Stoor scenes aligned with the levity of the Hobbits in Jackson's films.

Collider's Arezou Amin gave the episode 8 out of 10 and said it picked up the pace for the season with more action and new, interesting characters. She highlighted Kinnear's portrayal of Tom Bombadil, the Harfoots getting more to do, and said the action sequences were effective, but missed the Númenor and Dwarf storylines after the previous episode's cliffhanger ending. Giving the episode three stars out of five for Vulture, Keith Phipps said it was busy but managed to "balance pretty well" between action sequences and smaller character moments. He added that the many references to Tolkien's books and Jackson's films made the episode "a good example of The Rings of Power's ability to recycle creatively". Samantha Nelson at IGN gave the episode 6 out of 10 and described it as a "creature feature, with some fun fights and worldbuilding but little progress in the main plot". Nelson praised the scenes where the halflings discuss the Sûzat and Winterbloom discusses forgiveness, but found Isildur's romance with Estrid to be tedious and missed the season's main Sauron and Celebrimbor storyline.

Further discussing the episode's portrayal of Tom Bombadil, Phipps believed some fans would dislike the changes to the character but he felt "casting Rory Kinnear and letting him play [Tom] as a warmhearted weirdo goes a long way". Laura Miller at Slate criticized the decision to give Tom a role in the story, finding this to be antithetical to the character and blaming the series' supposed need to give each character an easily understood defining purpose. Writing for Screen Rant, Angel Shaw agreed that this is "not Tolkien's Tom Bombadil" but said the changes were effective for the series and created a new character for audiences to enjoy without taking away from the book version. Shaw particular liked the idea that this Tom is a mentor to the Wizards, feeling that it connected to the Wizard Gandalf's decision to spend time with Tom at the end of The Lord of the Rings.

=== Accolades ===
Jason Smith, Tim Keene, Ann Podlozny, Ara Khanikian, and Ryan Conder were nominated for Outstanding Visual Effects in a Photoreal Episode at the 2024 Visual Effects Society Awards for their work on the episode.

== Companion media ==
An episode of the aftershow Inside The Rings of Power for "Eldest" was released on September 5, 2024. It features actress Felicia Day, the host of The Official The Lord of the Rings: The Rings of Power Podcast, interviewing the directors and cast members Córdova, Baldry, and Kinnear about the making of the episode, with some behind-the-scenes footage.
