= Elven Kings Under the Sky =

- The Lord of the Rings: The Rings of Power episode
- Cover art for the episode's soundtrack album
- Episode no.: Season 2 Episode 1
- Directed by: Charlotte Brändström
- Written by: Gennifer Hutchison
- Cinematography by: Alex Disenhof
- Editing by: Dan Crinnion
- Original release date: August 29, 2024
- Running time: 69 minutes

Additional cast
- Jack Lowden as Forodwaith Sauron; Ben Daniels as Círdan; Sam Hazeldine as Adar; Nicholas Woodeson as Diarmid; Geoff Morrell as Waldreg; Amelia Kenworthy as Mirdania; Virginie Laverdure as Abigail; Jane Montgomery Griffiths as Astrid; Berynn Schwerdt as Eamon; Robert Strange as Glûg; Zates Atour as Brânk; Jamie Bisping as Calenwë; Emily-Jane McNeill as Ídhiel; Arkie Reece as Kilta

Episode chronology
← Previous "Alloyed"	Next → "Where the Stars are Strange"
- The Lord of the Rings: The Rings of Power season 2

"Elven Kings Under the Sky" is the first episode of the second season of the American fantasy television series The Lord of the Rings: The Rings of Power, which is based on J. R. R. Tolkien's history of Middle-earth. It was written by Gennifer Hutchison and directed by Charlotte Brändström.

The series is set thousands of years before Tolkien's novel The Lord of the Rings (1954–55), during the Second Age of Middle-earth. This episode shows the Elves' reactions to their Rings of Power. Filming for the second season took place in the United Kingdom and on location in the Canary Islands from October 2022 to June 2023.

"Elven Kings Under the Sky" premiered on the streaming service Amazon Prime Video on August 29, 2024, with the season's second and third episodes. There was a significant drop in viewership from the first season's premiere episodes, but viewership was still estimated to be high. This episode received generally positive reviews.

== Background ==
The Lord of the Rings: The Rings of Power is based on J. R. R. Tolkien's history of Middle-earth. It is set thousands of years before his novels The Hobbit (1937) and The Lord of the Rings (1954–55). While it is contractually not a continuation of Peter Jackson's The Lord of the Rings (2001–2003) and The Hobbit (2012–2014) film trilogies, it is intended to be visually consistent with them. J. D. Payne and Patrick McKay were hired to develop the series and serve as its showrunners. Production moved from New Zealand to the United Kingdom starting with the second season, which was directed by Charlotte Brändström, Sanaa Hamri, and Louise Hooper.

The series covers the major events of Middle-earth's Second Age. Amazon did not acquire the rights to Tolkien's main Second Age writings, so the writers identified references to the period in The Hobbit, The Lord of the Rings, and the latter's appendices, and created a story that bridges those passages. The Second Age begins after the defeat of the "Dark Lord" Morgoth, when his army of Orcs are scattered and his lieutenant Sauron is in hiding. The large cast of characters includes Elves, Dwarves, Men, and Harfoots, the last being precursors to the diminutive Hobbits from The Hobbit and The Lord of the Rings. In the first season, Sauron disguises himself as the human "Halbrand" and deceives the Elves into creating three Rings of Power, while the Orcs use the eruption of Mount Doom to create their own realm, the dark land of Mordor.

== Plot ==
At the dawn of the Second Age, Sauron declares himself to be the new Dark Lord and shares with the Orcs his plan to enslave the peoples of Middle-earth. The Orcs and their leader, Adar, turn on Sauron and seemingly kill him, but Sauron's spirit endures and forms a new body over thousands of years. Taking the name "Halbrand", Sauron joins a group of humans who become shipwrecked. This leads to him meeting the Elf Galadriel.

After Galadriel learns that Halbrand is Sauron and rejects his proposal to join him, she encourages the creation of three Rings of Power. Galadriel reveals Halbrand's identity to High King Gil-galad and his herald, Elrond, convincing Gil-galad that they must use the rings to restore the fading power of the Elves in preparation for a war against Sauron. Elrond objects, fearing that Sauron is manipulating them, and flees with the rings.

Sauron travels to Mordor, where the Orcs allow humans to join them if they swear fealty to Adar. Sauron poses as Halbrand and is tortured by Adar's followers. Without revealing his identity, he tells Adar that Sauron has returned and offers to find him in Eregion—the realm where the Elven-smith Celebrimbor forged the rings—while Adar raises his army. Waldreg, a human follower of Adar, is killed by a Warg that Sauron enthralls.

Elrond takes the rings to Círdan, the oldest and wisest Elf in Middle-earth, who agrees to throw them into a great chasm in the ocean. When a wave bumps Círdan's boat, he accidentally sees the rings and changes his mind, believing them to be true perfection. At the Elf-capital Lindon, Gil-galad tells the Elves that they must abandon Middle-earth to its fate, but he is interrupted when Círdan arrives wearing one of the rings. Despite Elrond's protests, Galadriel and Gil-galad put on the other two rings and the faded power of the Elves is restored.

The Stranger, a Wizard who is slowly regaining his memories, gets lost with Harfoot Nori Brandyfoot on their way to the land of Rhûn in the east of Middle-earth. They are followed by Nori's friend Poppy Proudfellow, who brings Harfoot maps that help them find their way. They are also followed by mysterious riders. Gil-galad sends a messenger to warn Celebrimbor of Halbrand's true identity, but Sauron arrives at Eregion first.

== Production ==
=== Writing ===
"Elven Kings Under the Sky" was written by Gennifer Hutchison. The title references a line from Tolkien's Ring Verse poem: "Three Rings for the Elven-kings under the sky".

=== Casting ===
The season's cast includes Robert Aramayo as Elrond, Morfydd Clark as Galadriel, Charles Edwards as Celebrimbor, Ciarán Hinds as the Dark Wizard, Markella Kavenagh as Elanor "Nori" Brandyfoot, Megan Richards as Poppy Proudfellow, Charlie Vickers as Sauron, Benjamin Walker as Gil-galad, and Daniel Weyman as the Stranger. Also starring in the episode are Jack Lowden as Forodwaith Sauron, Ben Daniels as Círdan, Sam Hazeldine as Adar, Nicholas Woodeson as Diarmid, Geoff Morrell as Waldreg, Amelia Kenworthy as Mirdania, Virginie Laverdure as Abigail, Jane Montgomery Griffiths as Astrid, Berynn Schwerdt as Eamon, Robert Strange as Glûg, Zates Atour as Brânk, Jamie Bisping as Calenwë, Emily-Jane McNeill as Ídhiel, and Arkie Reece as Kilta. Adam Basil and John Macdonald play unnamed Orcs in the episode.

=== Filming ===
Filming for the season began on October 3, 2022, under the working title LBP. Episodes were shot simultaneously based on the availability of locations and sets. Brändström directed "Elven Kings Under the Sky". Alex Disenhof was the cinematographer for her episodes, returning from the first season. The production wrapped in early June 2023.

=== Visual effects ===
Visual effects for the episode were created by Industrial Light & Magic (ILM), Rodeo FX, Outpost VFX, DNEG, The Yard VFX, Midas VFX, Monsters Aliens Robots Zombies, Untold Studios, Atomic Arts, and Cantina Creative. The different vendors were overseen by visual effects supervisor Jason Smith.

=== Music ===
The Lord of the Rings: The Rings of Power (Season Two, Episode One: Elven Kings Under the Sky – Amazon Original Series Soundtrack)

Film score by Bear McCreary
- Released: August 29, 2024
- Genres: Orchestra; choir; world
- Length: 45:32
- Languages: English; Constructed languages
- Labels: Amazon; Mutant

Bear McCreary chronology
The Lord of the Rings: The Rings of Power (Season Two) (2024)	Elven Kings Under the Sky (2024)	Where the Stars are Strange (2024)

A soundtrack album featuring composer Bear McCreary's score for the episode was released digitally on the streaming service Amazon Music on August 29, 2024. McCreary said the series' episodic albums contained "virtually every second of score" from their respective episodes. It was added to other music streaming services after the full second season was released. A CD featuring the episode's music is included in a limited edition box set collection for the season from Mutant and McCreary's label Sparks & Shadows. The box set was announced in October 2025, and includes a journal written by McCreary which details the creation of the episode's score. All music was composed by Bear McCreary:

Track listing
No.	Title	Length
1.	"Dawn of the Second Age"	12:55
2.	"The Last Hope for All Middle-earth"	3:24
3.	"Bow or Bleed"	3:18
4.	"Trees of Stone"	3:21
5.	"Círdan"	7:35
6.	"Warning in the Words"	2:34
7.	"To Serve the Lord of Mordor"	2:01
8.	"Three Rings for the Elven Kings" (featuring Benjamin Walker)	6:44
9.	"The Rings of Power – Season One Overture" (Bonus Track)	3:40
Total length:		45:32

== Release ==
The season's first three episodes premiered on the streaming service Amazon Prime Video on August 29, 2024. They were released at the same time around the world, in more than 240 countries and territories. Ahead of the third season's release in November 2026, a home media release for the first two seasons was announced. Each release features the eight episodes of the respective season along with behind-the-scenes content. They were released on 4K Ultra HD, Blu-ray, and DVD on November 3, and in limited edition 4K UHD SteelBook—with Amazon exclusive collectable art cards—on December 1.

== Reception ==
=== Viewership ===
Analytics company Samba TV—which gathers viewership data from three million smart TVs, weighted based on the US census—calculated that the episode was viewed by 902,000 US households in its first four days. This was a significant drop from the premiere episode of the first season, which Samba found to be viewed by 1.8 million US households in its first three days. The series was in seventh place on Samba's list of top streaming programs for the week ending September 1. Luminate, which also gathers viewership data from smart TVs, said the first three episodes were watched for 63.2 million minutes on their first day of release, and for 553.5 million minutes over the following four-day Labor Day weekend. Whip Media, which tracks viewership data for the 25 million worldwide users of its TV Time app, listed the series second—behind Hulu's Only Murders in the Building—on its US streaming chart for the week ending September 1. Nielsen Media Research, which records streaming viewership on US television screens, estimated that The Rings of Power had 1.02 billion minutes viewed in the week ending September 1. Around 70 percent of those were for the second season's first three episodes. It was the top original streaming series of the week, second overall streaming series behind Prison Break, and the third biggest debut for Prime Video in 2024 behind Fallout (2.9 billion minutes) and The Boys (1.19 billion). The number was 19 percent lower than Nielsen's calculation for the opening week of the first season (1.25 billion minutes).

=== Critical response ===
On review aggregator Rotten Tomatoes, 86% of 14 critics gave the episode a positive review and the average of rated reviews was 7.6 out of 10.

Keith Phipps at Vulture gave the episode three stars out of five and called it a "pretty compelling season premiere". He praised the visuals and the cast, felt the episode was successful in outlining the overall story for the rest of the season, and said the action moments indicated a "more kinetic season than the first". He thought some viewers would be frustrated by the episode falling into the same rhythms as the first season and also criticized the fact that the episode did not work as a standalone installment. Arezou Amin of Collider gave the episode 7 out of 10 and called it "a densely packed episode with no shortage of big moments". She questioned the decision to release the season's first three episodes at once, feeling there was so much in the first episode that it would have benefitted from giving the audience a week to think about it before releasing the next episode. Amin said Galadriel and Elrond's storyline was the strongest and most emotional of the episode, and also praised the backstory given to Sauron as well as the reunion of Nori and Poppy. She criticized the amount of exposition in some scenes.

Writing for Gizmodo, James Whitbrook said the episode did a "noble job" catching up the audience on key plotlines from the first season, and highlighted Vickers work as Sauron in the episode. He felt the audience's knowledge this season that Vickers is portraying Sauron worked well for scenes where he interacts with other characters in disguise. On the other hand, Whitbrook criticized the extended drama of Elrond running with the rings and attempting to destroy them considering the audience is aware that the three rings will not be destroyed. Matt Schimkowitz at The A.V. Club said the series returned "more steadfast in its ways" with a lot of heart and more nuance than the first season. He particularly praised the focus on Sauron, but was less positive about Hazeldine taking over as Adar; he felt the first season's Joseph Mawle brought more gravitas to the role. Schimkowitz also felt the arrival of Poppy too closely mirrored the arrivals of Merry Brandybuck and Pippin Took in Jackson's films, saying "Rings of Power's over-reliance on Jackson's cinematic language can get tiresome".

Leon Miller of Polygon felt the episode was "more of the same" from the first season, with some changes from Tolkien's lore that worked in context and others that did not. He appreciated the "attention-grabbing" opening sequence, feeling it was a response to the slow start of the first season, and highlighted Adar's role as a supporting villain. Miller felt the central storyline of the coming war between the Elves and Sauron was not as "narratively interesting or thematically rich" as the showrunners thought it was, but he found the episode to be "inexplicably watchable" and thought the same would hold true for all but the "most die-hard Tolkien truthers".

== Companion media ==
An episode of the aftershow Inside The Rings of Power for "Elven Kings Under the Sky" was released on August 29, 2024. It features actress Felicia Day, the host of The Official The Lord of the Rings: The Rings of Power Podcast, interviewing cast members Walker and Vickers about the making of the episode, with some behind-the-scenes footage.
