= The Eagle and the Sceptre =

- The Lord of the Rings: The Rings of Power episode
- Cover art for the episode's soundtrack album
- Episode no.: Season 2 Episode 3
- Directed by: Louise Hooper; Charlotte Brändström
- Written by: Helen Shang
- Cinematography by: Laurie Rose; Alex Disenhof
- Editing by: Andy Morrison
- Original release date: August 29, 2024
- Running time: 67 minutes

Additional cast
- Alex Tarrant as Valandil; Ema Horvath as Eärien; Leon Wadham as Kemen; Will Keen as Belzagar; Sam Hazeldine as Adar; Nia Towle as Estrid; Kevin Eldon as Narvi; Robert Strange as Khruge and Glûg; Ken Blackburn as Tar-Palantir; William Chubb as the High Priest of Númenor; Kirsty Hoiles as Niluzôr; Benjamin Walker as the voice of Damrod; Nazanin Boniadi as Bronwyn; Gabriel Akuwudike as Hagen; Murray McArthur as Ammred

Episode chronology
← Previous "Where the Stars are Strange"	Next → "Eldest"
- The Lord of the Rings: The Rings of Power season 2

"The Eagle and the Sceptre" is the third episode of the second season of the American fantasy television series The Lord of the Rings: The Rings of Power, which is based on J. R. R. Tolkien's history of Middle-earth. It was written by Helen Shang and directed by Louise Hooper and Charlotte Brändström.

The series is set thousands of years before Tolkien's novel The Lord of the Rings (1954–55), during the Second Age of Middle-earth. This episode focuses on characters from Númenor. Filming for the second season took place in the United Kingdom and on location in the Canary Islands from October 2022 to June 2023.

"The Eagle and the Sceptre" premiered on the streaming service Amazon Prime Video on August 29, 2024, with the season's first and second episodes. There was a significant drop in viewership from the first season's premiere episodes, but viewership was still estimated to be high. This episode received generally positive reviews but with mixed responses to the fast pacing of the Númenórean storyline. Some commentary and audience responses focused on the brief introduction of an Orc wife and baby.

== Background ==
The Lord of the Rings: The Rings of Power is based on J. R. R. Tolkien's history of Middle-earth. It is set thousands of years before his novels The Hobbit (1937) and The Lord of the Rings (1954–55). While it is contractually not a continuation of Peter Jackson's The Lord of the Rings (2001–2003) and The Hobbit (2012–2014) film trilogies, it is intended to be visually consistent with them. J. D. Payne and Patrick McKay were hired to develop the series and serve as its showrunners. Production moved from New Zealand to the United Kingdom starting with the second season, which was directed by Charlotte Brändström, Sanaa Hamri, and Louise Hooper.

The series covers the major events of Middle-earth's Second Age. Amazon did not acquire the rights to Tolkien's main Second Age writings, so the writers identified references to the period in The Hobbit, The Lord of the Rings, and the latter's appendices, and created a story that bridges those passages. The Second Age begins after the defeat of the "Dark Lord" Morgoth, when his army of Orcs are scattered and his lieutenant Sauron is in hiding. The large cast of characters includes Elves, Dwarves, Men, and Harfoots, the last being precursors to the diminutive Hobbits from The Hobbit and The Lord of the Rings. In the first season, Sauron disguises himself as the human "Halbrand" and deceives the Elves into creating three Rings of Power, while the Orcs use the eruption of Mount Doom to create their own realm, the dark land of Mordor.

== Plot ==
After his son Isildur is presumed dead in the eruption of Mount Doom, sea captain Elendil returns to Númenor with the blinded Queen Regent Míriel and other survivors. He attempts to take Isildur's horse Berek with them, but the horse refuses to go and Elendil releases him. Berek returns to Mordor and finds Isildur, alive, in a nest of giant spiders. Isildur fights a particularly large spider and escapes on Berek. Elsewhere in Mordor, Orc leader Adar asks Damrod, a Hill-troll, to join his army in fighting Sauron.

Elf-smith Celebrimbor and Sauron, posing as Annatar the "Lord of Gifts", invite Dwarf Prince Durin IV and Princess Disa to Eregion and reveal their plan to create Rings of Power for the Dwarves. Durin IV does not trust Annatar and reluctantly brings this proposal to King Durin III, who agrees to give the Elves the mithril they need to create more rings.

In Númenor, some citizens disapprove of Míriel's ascension to the throne following the death of her father, King Tar-Palantir, due to her blindness and the deaths caused by her decision to go to Middle-earth. Lord Belzagar counsels Míriel's cousin Pharazôn to claim the throne, but Pharazôn is concerned that there is not enough public support. Elendil's daughter Eärien reveals to them that she has stolen Míriel's palantír seeing stone.

Leaving Mordor, Isildur comes across a young woman named Estrid and together they make their way to Pelargir, an old Númenórean colony. They are attacked by some Wild Men who bear the brand of Adar. The Elf Arondir saves the pair, but the Wild Men escape with Berek. In Pelargir, Arondir holds a funeral for Bronwyn, the human healer he fell in love with who succumbed to her injuries from the battle before the eruption. Bronwyn's son Theo dismisses Arondir's attempts to comfort him. Isildur bonds with Estrid over the deaths of their respective loved ones, not knowing that she secretly bears the brand of Adar. Theo and Isildur attempt to steal Berek back from the Wild Men and almost succeed, until Theo and the Wild Men are captured by something unknown.

During Míriel's coronation, Eärien reveals the palantír. This causes outrage among some citizens who are against Númenor's old Elven ways. A Great Eagle arrives at the coronation, a rare and powerful omen for the new ruler, but Belzagar claims that the Eagle's presence signifies support for Pharazôn instead.

== Production ==
=== Writing ===
"The Eagle and the Sceptre" was written by Helen Shang. It briefly introduces the wife and baby of the Orc Glûg. The showrunners explained that they were exploring how the Orcs are more complex beings during this time period, before they are enslaved by Sauron, continuing from the first season where Adar gave the Orcs their own homeland in Mordor. Payne and McKay said Glûg was a pivotal part of this storyline and he takes the position "we have this home now in Mordor, so do we really have to go to war and die?" They showed his family early in the season to establish his motivations ahead of further character developments in later episodes.

=== Casting ===
The season's cast includes Cynthia Addai-Robinson as Míriel, Owain Arthur as Durin IV, Maxim Baldry as Isildur, Ismael Cruz Córdova as Arondir, Charles Edwards as Celebrimbor, Trystan Gravelle as Pharazôn, Tyroe Muhafidin as Theo, Peter Mullan as Durin III, Sophia Nomvete as Disa, Lloyd Owen as Elendil, and Charlie Vickers as Sauron. Also starring in the episode are Alex Tarrant as Valandil, Ema Horvath as Eärien, Leon Wadham as Kemen, Will Keen as Belzagar, Sam Hazeldine as Adar, Nia Towle as Estrid, Kevin Eldon as Narvi, Robert Strange as Khruge and Glûg, Ken Blackburn as Tar-Palantir, William Chubb as the High Priest of Númenor, Kirsty Hoiles as Niluzor, Benjamin Walker as the voice of Damrod, Nazanin Boniadi as Bronwyn, Gabriel Akuwudike as Hagen, and Murray McArthur as Ammred. Jonny James plays unnamed Orcs in the episode.

=== Filming ===
Filming for the season began on October 3, 2022, under the working title LBP. Episodes were shot simultaneously based on the availability of locations and sets. Hooper and Brändström directed "The Eagle and the Sceptre". Alex Disenhof was the cinematographer for Brändström's episodes, returning from the first season, with Laurie Rose working on Hooper's episodes. The production wrapped in early June 2023.

=== Visual effects ===
Visual effects for the episode were created by Rodeo FX, Outpost VFX, Industrial Light & Magic (ILM), DNEG, The Yard VFX, Midas VFX, Monsters Aliens Robots Zombies, Untold Studios, Atomic Arts, and Cantina Creative. The different vendors were overseen by visual effects supervisor Jason Smith.

=== Music ===
The Lord of the Rings: The Rings of Power (Season Two, Episode Three: The Eagle and the Sceptre – Amazon Original Series Soundtrack)

Film score by Bear McCreary
- Released: August 29, 2024
- Genres: Orchestra; choir; world
- Length: 41:24
- Languages: English; Constructed languages
- Labels: Amazon; Mutant

Bear McCreary chronology
Where the Stars are Strange (2024)	The Eagle and the Sceptre (2024)	Eldest (2024)

A soundtrack album featuring composer Bear McCreary's score for the episode was released digitally on the streaming service Amazon Music on August 29, 2024. McCreary said the series' episodic albums contained "virtually every second of score" from their respective episodes. It was added to other music streaming services after the full second season was released. A CD featuring the episode's music is included in a limited edition box set collection for the season from Mutant and McCreary's label Sparks & Shadows. The box set was announced in October 2025, and includes a journal written by McCreary which details the creation of the episode's score. All music was composed by Bear McCreary:

Track listing
No.	Title	Length
1.	"Shelob's Nest"	4:50
2.	"Númenórean Grief"	4:19
3.	"Enter Damrod" (featuring Jens Kidman)	0:57
4.	"Mithril for Rings"	4:14
5.	"The Road to Pelargir"	3:52
6.	"Funeral Pyre and Reconciliation" (featuring Raya Yarbrough)	4:31
7.	"Isildur and Estrid"	3:04
8.	"The Wild Men"	2:02
9.	"The Great Eagle and the Forging"	6:46
10.	"The Rings of Power – Title Announcement Trailer" (Bonus Track)	1:05
11.	"The Rings of Power – Season Two Overture" (Bonus Track)	1:26
12.	"The Rings of Power – London Premiere Season One Fanfare" (Bonus Track)	4:18
Total length:		41:24

== Release ==
The season's first three episodes premiered on the streaming service Amazon Prime Video on August 29, 2024. They were released at the same time around the world, in more than 240 countries and territories. Ahead of the third season's release in November 2026, a home media release for the first two seasons was announced. Each release features the eight episodes of the respective season along with behind-the-scenes content. They were released on 4K Ultra HD, Blu-ray, and DVD on November 3, and in limited edition 4K UHD SteelBook—with Amazon exclusive collectable art cards—on December 1.

== Reception ==
=== Viewership ===
Luminate, which gathers viewership data from smart TVs, said the first three episodes of the season were watched for 63.2 million minutes on their first day of release, and for 553.5 million minutes over the following four-day Labor Day weekend. Whip Media, which tracks viewership data for the 25 million worldwide users of its TV Time app, listed the series second—behind Hulu's Only Murders in the Building—on its US streaming chart for the week ending September 1. Nielsen Media Research, which records streaming viewership on US television screens, estimated that The Rings of Power had 1.02 billion minutes viewed in the week ending September 1. Around 70 percent of those were for the first three episodes. It was the top original streaming series of the week and second overall behind Prison Break. The number was 19 percent lower than Nielsen's calculation for the opening week of the first season (1.25 billion minutes). Samba TV, which also gathers viewership data from smart TVs, listed the series seventh on its chart of top streaming programs for the week ending September 1.

=== Critical response ===
On review aggregator Rotten Tomatoes, 83% of 12 critics gave the episode a positive review and the average of rated reviews was 7.1 out of 10.

Keith Phipps at Vulture gave the episode three stars out of five and said the decision to release the season's first three episodes at once made sense, stating: "Each involves a certain amount of table-setting but also an escalation of the action, particularly in this episode". He highlighted the quick rise and fall of Míriel and felt the series was "ready to really get moving", but was less positive about the number of characters and complex motivations for viewers to keep track of in the Númenórean storyline. Arezou Amin of Collider gave the episode 8 out of 10 and said "the ball [is] well and truly rolling" on the season's stories. She found the politics and scheming of the Númenórean stoyline to be compelling and well told, and was also positive about how nuanced the episode's story of grief and loss is. On the other hand, Amin was critical about how little the Dwarves had to do in the episode.

Writing for Gizmodo, James Whitbrook said the episode did a "noble job" catching up the audience on key plotlines from the first season, and highlighted the Southlander stoyline and their grief following Bronwyn's death. He thought Isildur's encounter with Shelob was "completely unnecessary but suitably creepy". Whitbrook was more critical of how quickly the Númenórean storyline was being told. Matt Schimkowitz at The A.V. Club praised the episode as the best of the season so far, partially attributing this to the focus on Isildur who is "the closest thing we've got to a regular human on the show". He enjoyed the spider sequence, calling it a "blast". Leon Miller of Polygon felt the episode was "more of the same" from the first season, with some changes from Tolkien's lore that worked in context and others that did not. He said the Pharazôn storyline made the series more interesting, but was concerned that it was not getting the time it needed. Miller had negative thoughts about the Southlanders storyline, feeling its "you're not my dad" scene between Theo and Arondir and the meeting of Isildur and Estrid were both beneath the works of Tolkien. Despite this, he found the episode to be "inexplicably watchable" and thought the same would hold true for all but the "most die-hard Tolkien truthers".

=== Audience response ===
The introduction of an Orc wife and baby led to negative responses from some viewers and commentators, partially due to misconceptions about how Orcs reproduce stemming from scenes in Jackson's films that show Uruk-hai—which are Orc-Man hybrids—being created in the ground. There were also concerns that the series was making the Orcs more sympathetic than the "pure embodiment of evil" that Tolkien intended. Other commentators responded to these thoughts by noting that Tolkien confirmed the existence of female Orcs; depicted some Orcs in The Lord of the Rings as being more sympathetic; and provided multiple accounts of where Orcs come from, including a line in The Silmarillion (1977) which says they reproduce through sexual intercourse. The showrunners said they were shocked by the negative responses to the scene, pointing to Tolkien's description of Orcs reproducing sexually and taking issue with the perspective that depicting an Orc family "would somehow feel like moral relativism, or that we're saying that Orcs are victims", which was not their intention.

== Companion media ==
An episode of the aftershow Inside The Rings of Power for "The Eagle and the Sceptre" was released on August 29, 2024. It features actress Felicia Day, the host of The Official The Lord of the Rings: The Rings of Power Podcast, interviewing cast members Addai-Robinson, Gravelle, and Horvath about the making of the episode, with some behind-the-scenes footage.
