= Road to Ruin (1991 film) =

1991 film by Charlotte Brändström

- Directed by: Charlotte Brandström
- Screenplay by: Erik Greenberg Anjou
- Story by: Richard Gitelson; Eric Freiser
- Produced by: Monique Annaud
- Starring: Richard Gitelson; Eric Freiser; Erik Greenberg Anjou
- Cinematography: Jean-Yves Le Mener
- Edited by: Michèle Robert-Lauliac
- Music by: John Goldstein
- Production company: StudioCanal
- Distributed by: Live Home Video
- Release date: October 9, 1991
- Running time: 94 minutes
- Countries: France; United States
- Languages: English; French

Road to Ruin is a 1991 romantic comedy, directed by Charlotte Brandström

== Plot ==
A wealthy American businessman living in Paris who falls in love with a fashion model and decides to test her love by giving up his fortune.

== Cast ==
- Peter Weller as Jack Sloan
- Carey Lowell as Jessie Tailor
- Michel Duchaussoy as Julien Boulet
- Nathalie Auffret as Girlfriend at Art Gallery
- Pierre Belot as Driver
- Antoine Blanquefort as McGurk
