= List of The Lord of the Rings: The Rings of Power characters =

The Lord of the Rings: The Rings of Power is an American fantasy television series developed by J. D. Payne and Patrick McKay for the streaming service Amazon Prime Video. It is based on J. R. R. Tolkien's history of Middle-earth, primarily material from the appendices of the novel The Lord of the Rings (1954–55). The series is set thousands of years before the novel and depicts the major events of Middle-earth's Second Age. It is produced by Amazon MGM Studios in association with New Line Cinema. The series features a large ensemble cast portraying characters from Tolkien's writings as well as original creations for the series.

== Background ==
Amazon acquired the global television rights for J. R. R. Tolkien's The Lord of the Rings (1954–55) in November 2017. The company's streaming service, Amazon Prime Video, gave a multi-season commitment to a series based on the novel and its appendices, to be produced by Amazon Studios in association with New Line Cinema and in consultation with the Tolkien Estate. J. D. Payne and Patrick McKay were set as showrunners of the series, titled The Lord of the Rings: The Rings of Power, which is set in the Second Age of Middle-earth, thousands of years before Tolkien's The Hobbit (1937) and The Lord of the Rings. It follows a large cast of characters and covers all the major events of the Second Age from Tolkien's writings: the forging of the Rings of Power, the rise of the Dark Lord Sauron, the fall of the island kingdom of Númenor, and the last alliance between Elves and Men.

The series was originally expected to be a continuation of Peter Jackson's The Lord of the Rings (2001–2003) and The Hobbit (2012–2014) film trilogies, but Amazon later clarified that their deal with Tolkien's estate required them to keep the series distinct from the films. Despite this, the showrunners intended for it to be visually consistent with the films and wanted any returning characters to look like they could grow up to be their film counterparts. Amazon confirmed in September 2019 that filming for the first season would take place in New Zealand, where Jackson's films were made. Seven of the season's main actors were New Zealanders, with the rest of the cast coming from Australia, Sri Lanka, the United Kingdom, and the United States. In August 2021, Amazon announced that it was moving production of future seasons to the UK where more than half of the cast was from.

== Overview ==
=== Starring cast ===
Overview of the starring cast for The Lord of the Rings: The Rings of Power
Character	Actor	Race or people	Created by Tolkien	Appearances		
Character	Actor	Race or people	Created by Tolkien	Season 1	Season 2	Season 3
Galadriel	Morfydd Clark (Note: Amelie Child-Villiers portrays young Galadriel in a supporting role for the first season.)	Elves	Yes	Starring	Starring	Starring
Sadoc Burrows	Lenny Henry	Harfoots	—N/a	Starring		
Marigold Brandyfoot	Sara Zwangobani	Harfoots	—N/a	Starring		
Largo Brandyfoot	Dylan Smith	Harfoots	—N/a	Starring		
Nori Brandyfoot	Markella Kavenagh	Harfoots	—N/a	Starring	Starring	
Poppy Proudfellow	Megan Richards	Harfoots	—N/a	Starring	Starring	
Elrond (Note: Robert Aramayo also portrays Elrond's brother Elros in the third season.)	Robert Aramayo	Elves	Yes	Starring	Starring	Starring
Gil-galad	Benjamin Walker	Elves	Yes	Starring	Starring	Starring
Arondir	Ismael Cruz Córdova	Elves	—N/a	Starring	Starring	Starring
Bronwyn	Nazanin Boniadi	Low Men	—N/a	Starring	Body double	
Theo	Tyroe Muhafidin	Low Men	—N/a	Starring	Starring	Starring
Celebrimbor	Charles Edwards	Elves	Yes	Starring	Starring	Other
Gandalf (Note: Gandalf is known as "The Stranger" until the end of the second season.)	Daniel Weyman	Maiar	Yes	Starring	Starring	Starring
Durin IV	Owain Arthur	Dwarves	Yes	Starring	Starring	Starring
Sauron (Note: Sauron poses as the human "Halbrand" in the first season and as the Elf "Annatar" in the second.)	Charlie Vickers (Note: Jack Lowden portrays Sauron's previous form in a supporting role for the second season.)	Maiar	Yes	Starring	Starring	Starring
Disa	Sophia Nomvete	Dwarves	—N/a	Starring	Starring	Starring
Elendil	Lloyd Owen	High Men	Yes	Starring	Starring	Starring
Míriel	Cynthia Addai-Robinson	High Men	Yes	Starring	Starring	Starring
Pharazôn	Trystan Gravelle	High Men	Yes	Starring	Starring	Starring
Isildur	Maxim Baldry	High Men	Yes	Starring	Starring	Starring
Eärien	Ema Horvath	High Men	—N/a	Starring	Supporting	Supporting
Kemen	Leon Wadham	High Men	—N/a	Starring	Supporting	Supporting
Dark Wizard	Ciarán Hinds	Maiar	Yes		Starring	Starring
Durin III	Peter Mullan	Dwarves	Yes	Supporting	Starring	

=== Supporting and other cast ===
Overview of the supporting and other cast for The Lord of the Rings: The Rings of Power
Character	Actor	Race or people	Created by Tolkien	Appearances		
Character	Actor	Race or people	Created by Tolkien	Season 1	Season 2	Season 3
Finrod	Will Fletcher	Elves	Yes	Supporting		
Thondir	Fabian McCallum	Elves	—N/a	Supporting		
Rían	Kip Chapman	Elves	—N/a	Supporting		
Malva	Thusitha Jayasundera	Harfoots	—N/a	Supporting		
Vilma	Maxine Cunliffe	Harfoots	—N/a	Supporting		
Dilly Brandyfoot	Beau Cassidy	Harfoots	—N/a	Supporting		
Waldreg	Geoff Morrell	Low Men	—N/a	Supporting	Supporting	
Tredwill	Peter Tait	Low Men	—N/a	Supporting		
Rowan	Ian Blackburn	Low Men	—N/a	Supporting		
Médhor	Augustus Prew	Elves	—N/a	Supporting		
Revion	Simon Merrells	Elves	—N/a	Supporting		
Ontamo	Anthony Crum	High Men	—N/a	Supporting		
Valandil	Alex Tarrant	High Men	—N/a	Supporting	Supporting	
Adar	Joseph Mawle	Orcs	—N/a	Supporting		
Adar	Sam Hazeldine	Orcs	—N/a		Supporting	
Tar-Palantir	Ken Blackburn	High Men	Yes	Supporting		
The Nomad	Edith Poor	Easterlings	—N/a	Supporting		
The Ascetic	Kali Kopae	Easterlings	—N/a	Supporting		
The Dweller	Bridie Sisson	Easterlings	—N/a	Supporting	Other	
Círdan	Ben Daniels	Elves	Yes		Supporting	Supporting
Diarmid	Nicholas Woodeson	Low Men	—N/a		Supporting	
Mirdania	Amelia Kenworthy	Elves	—N/a		Supporting	
Glûg	Robert Strange	Orcs	—N/a		Other	
Brânk	Zates Atour	Easterlings	—N/a		Other	
Kilta	Arkie Reece	Easterlings	—N/a		Other	
Narvi	Kevin Eldon	Dwarves	Yes		Supporting	Supporting
Barduk	Stuart Bowman	Dwarves	—N/a		Other	
Belzagar	Will Keen	High Men	—N/a		Supporting	Supporting
Estrid	Nia Towle	Low Men	—N/a		Supporting	
High Priest	William Chubb	High Men	—N/a		Other	
Damrod	Benjamin Walker (Note: Visual effects supervisor Jason Smith also portrays Damrod for a small role in the second season.)	Trolls	—N/a		Other	
Hagen	Gabriel Akuwudike	Low Men	—N/a		Other	
Tom Bombadil	Rory Kinnear	Unknown	Yes		Supporting	Supporting
Snaggleroot	Jim Broadbent	Ents	—N/a		Supporting	
Winterbloom	Olivia Williams	Ents	—N/a		Supporting	
Camnir	Calam Lynch	Elves	—N/a		Supporting	
Merimac	Gavi Singh Chera	Stoors	—N/a		Supporting	
Gundabale Earthauler	Tanya Moodie	Stoors	—N/a		Supporting	
Vorohil	Charlie Rix	Elves	—N/a		Other	
Rían	Selina Lo	Elves	—N/a		Other	
Daemor	Oliver Alvin-Wilson	Elves	—N/a		Other	
Goldberry	Raya Yarbrough	Unknown	Yes		Other	

== Elves ==
=== Created by Tolkien ===
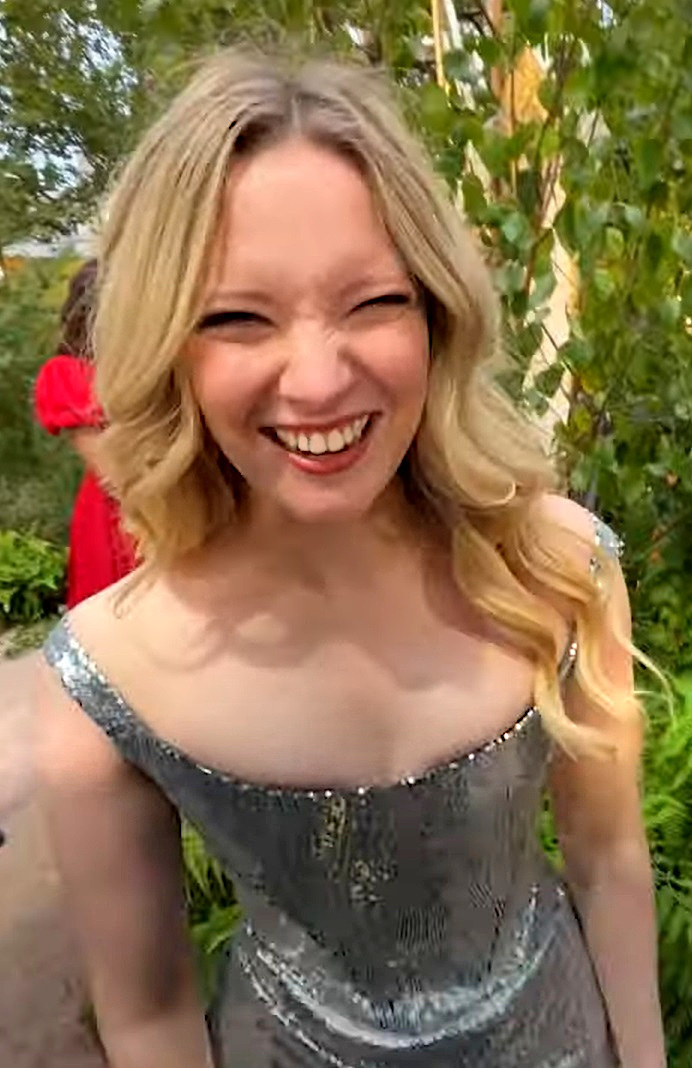
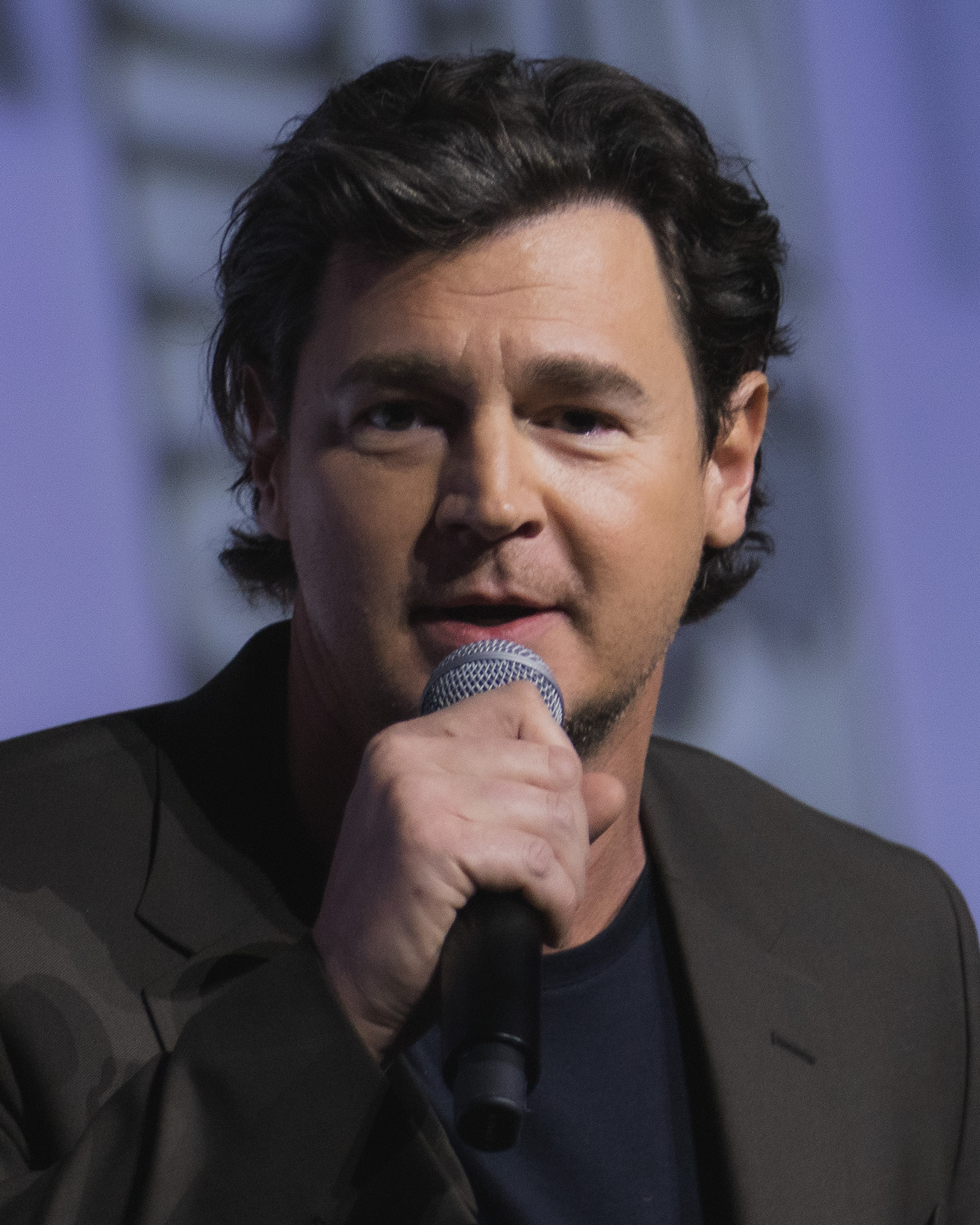
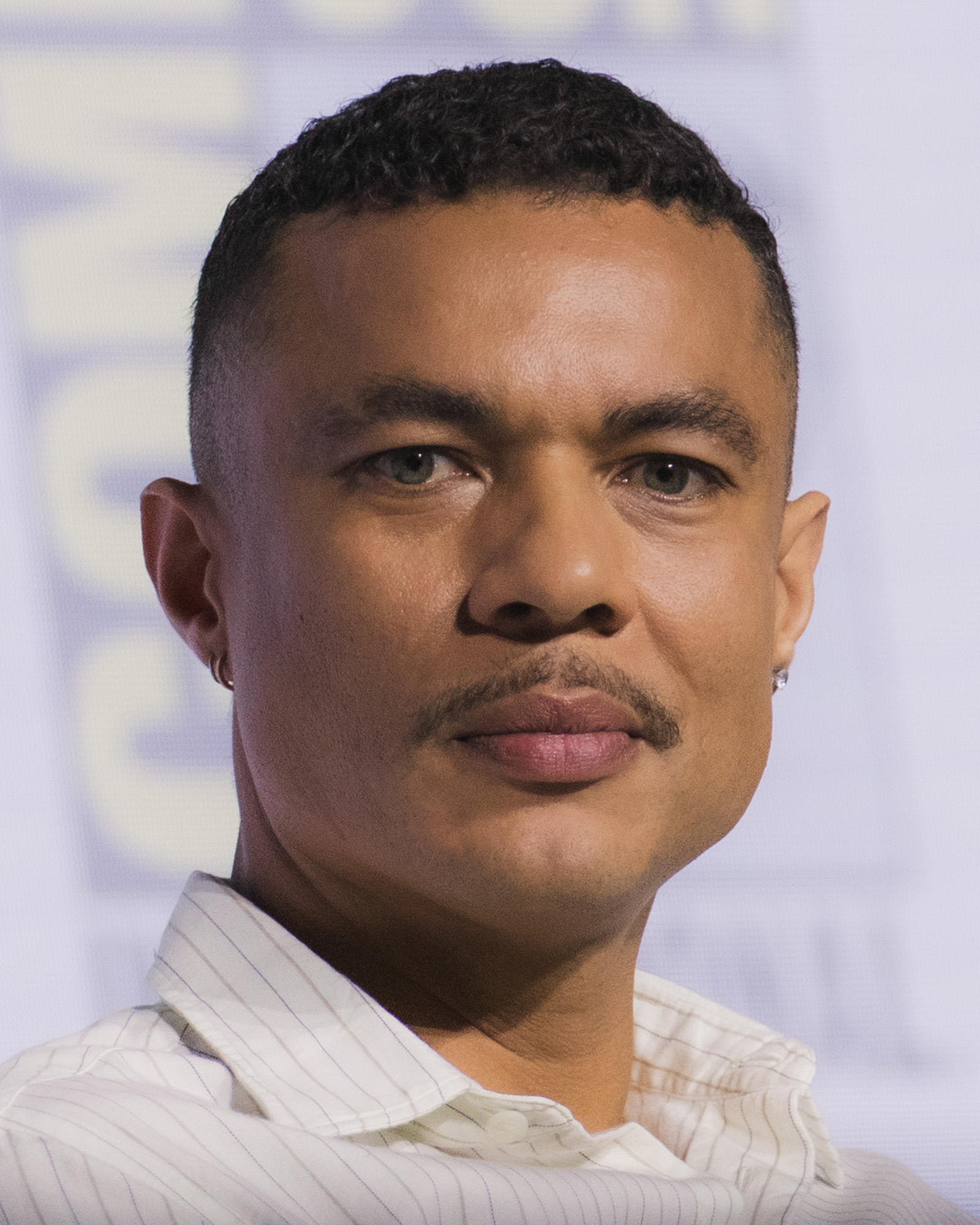
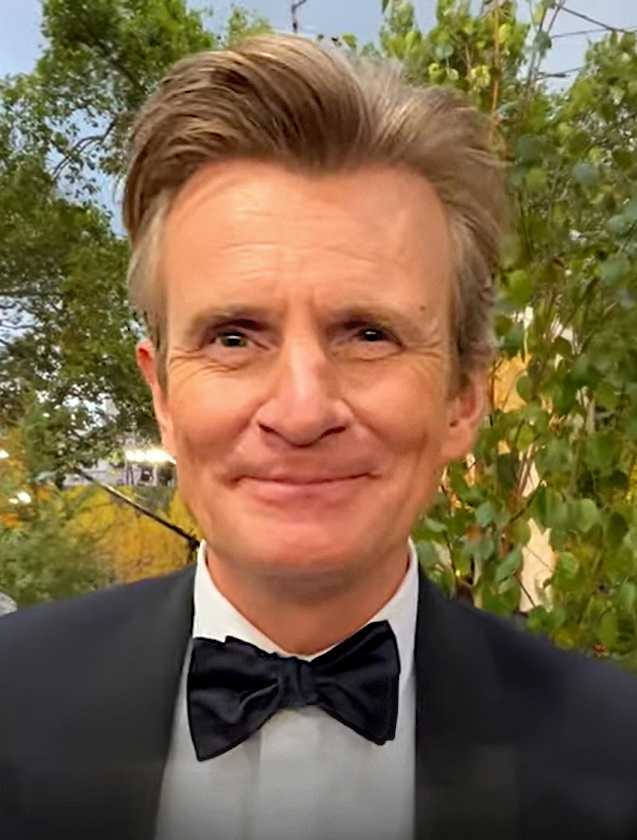
Actors portraying Elves include Morfydd Clark, Benjamin Walker, Ismael Cruz Córdova, and Charles Edwards
- Galadriel (portrayed by Morfydd Clark):
  An Elven warrior who believes evil is returning to Middle-earth, and is deceived by the Dark Lord Sauron in his disguise as the human Halbrand during the first season. Executive producer Lindsey Weber said Galadriel is humbled by her mistakes in the first season and has to evaluate her future. The second season also explores how she is affected by the Ring of Power Nenya. The series shows the character's journey from a warrior to the "elder stateswoman" that she is portrayed as in Tolkien's The Lord of the Rings. The showrunners based her initial depiction in the series on a letter in which Tolkien described a young Galadriel as being of "Amazon disposition". Based on Tolkien's description of Galadriel's hair being "lit with gold", the wig used for her in the series includes gold-plated and silver-plated strands. Amelie Child-Villiers portrays young Galadriel.
- Finrod (portrayed by Will Fletcher): Galadriel's brother who died hunting Sauron, inspiring her to continue the search
- Elrond (portrayed by Robert Aramayo):
  A half-Elven politician. Aramayo was interested by the pressure that Elrond faces living up to the legacy of his father, Eärendil, and by Elrond's choice to be immortal compared to his brother Elros whom Elrond had to watch grow old and die. Elrond goes from being optimistic and eager to world-weary and closed-off throughout the series.
- Gil-galad (portrayed by Benjamin Walker):
  The High King of the Elves who rules from the realm of Lindon. The character is mentioned in Tolkien's The Lord of the Rings in a poem called "The Fall of Gil-galad", and Walker said the series would expand on that. He highlighted Gil-galad's "odd gift of foresight. He's prescient, and he's ahead of the curve. He can kind of feel the pulse of evil rising."
- Celebrimbor (portrayed by Charles Edwards):
  The Elven-smith who forges the Rings of Power, after being deceived by the Dark Lord Sauron. Celebrimbor is the greatest Elvish craftsmen since his grandfather Fëanor, who created the famous Silmarils during the First Age. Edwards described the character as vain, ambitious, and desperate to create something that will outshine the Silmarils. He also compared the character to J. Robert Oppenheimer, the "father of the atomic bomb". The showrunners said Celebrimbor was the "principal protagonist" of the second season.
- Círdan (portrayed by Ben Daniels): Known as "Círdan the Shipwright", he is an expert shipwright and the master of the Grey Havens who bears the Ring of Power Narya
- Celeborn (portrayed by Jamie Campbell Bower):
  Galadriel's husband, an Elf lord and warrior. He is reunited with Galadriel in the third season after being presumed dead for much of the series, and Bower said the character has a deep longing and yearning for his wife that has helped him survive until this point. The actor took inspiration from Tolkien's relationship with his wife Edith, and described Celeborn as a "lover-boy".

=== Introduced in the first season ===
- Thondir (portrayed by Fabian McCallum): An Elf hunting for Sauron with Galadriel
- Rían (portrayed by Kip Chapman): An Elf hunting for Sauron with Galadriel
- Arondir (portrayed by Ismael Cruz Córdova):
  A Wood Elf with a forbidden love for the human healer Bronwyn, similar to Tolkien's love stories about Beren and Lúthien and Aragorn and Arwen. Arondir is a frontline soldier rather than the "royal and regal" Elves that are traditionally focused on in Tolkien's stories. Córdova, who is Puerto Rican, was proud to be the first non-white actor to portray an Elf in a Tolkien adaptation despite facing racist comments about his casting. Because of these responses, Córdova felt he needed to be "undeniable... the most Elven Elf that I could be". He trained in martial arts such as wushu, kung fu, and capoeira for the character's action sequences.
- Médhor (portrayed by Augustus Prew): An Elf serving with Arondir in the Southlands who is killed by Orcs
- Revion (portrayed by Simon Merrells): The Elven Watchwarden of the Southlands who is killed by Orcs

=== Introduced in the second season ===
- Mirdania (portrayed by Amelia Kenworthy): A protégée of Celebrimbor, who is manipulated by Sauron. The latter pushes Mirdania from the walls of Eregion to her death and blames Celebrimbor.
- Camnir (portrayed by Calam Lynch): An Elven map-maker and navigation expert who joins Elrond's band of warrior-elves. He is shot by an Orc and healed by Galadriel using Nenya.
- Vorohil (portrayed by Charlie Rix): An Elven swordsman who joins Elrond's band of warrior-elves
- Rían (portrayed by Selina Lo): One of the greatest archers from Lindon who joins Elrond's band of warrior-elves, and dies during the Siege of Eregion
- Daemor (portrayed by Oliver Alvin-Wilson): An Elven swordsman who joins Elrond's band of warrior-elves and is killed by the Barrow-wights

== Dwarves ==
=== Created by Tolkien ===
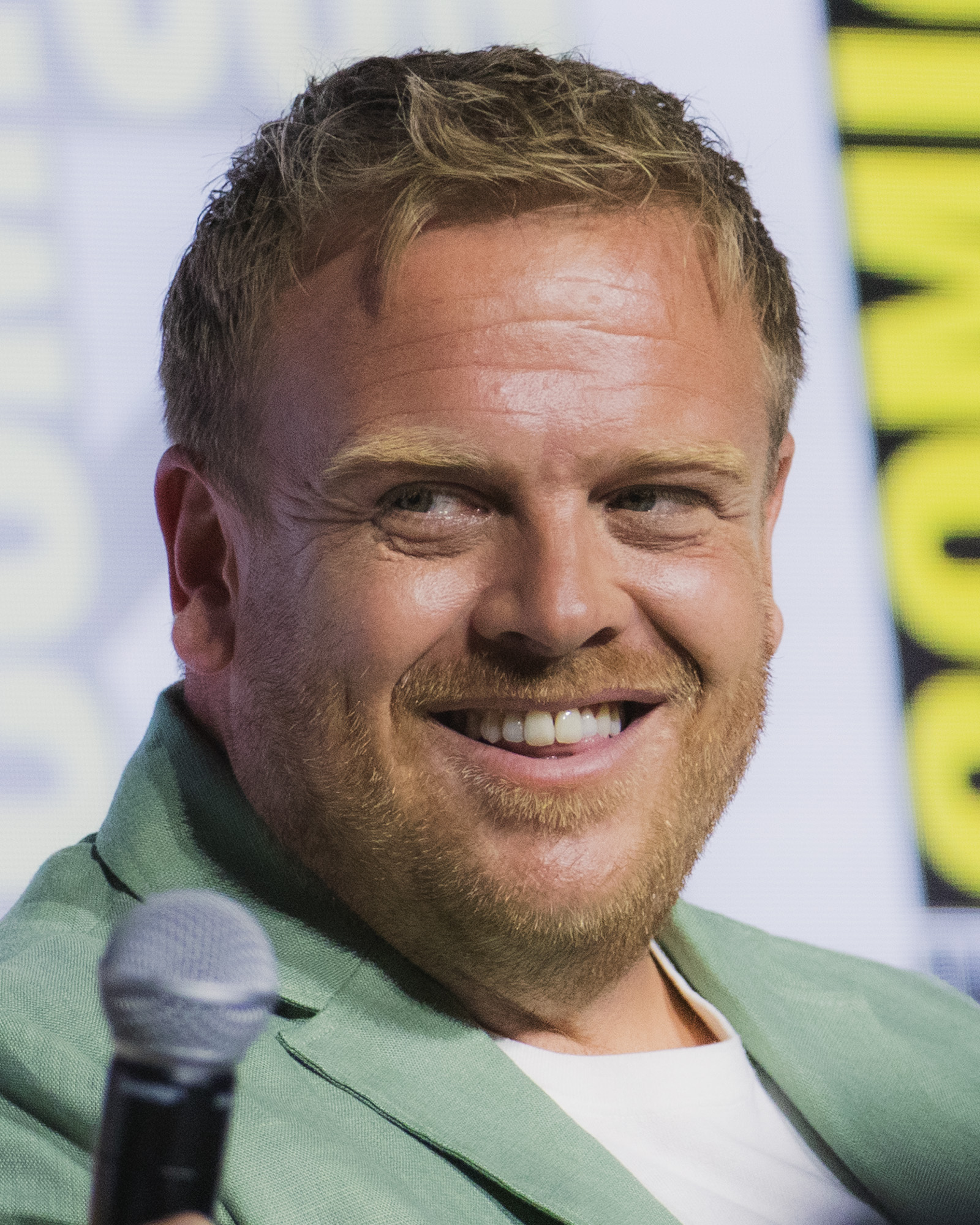
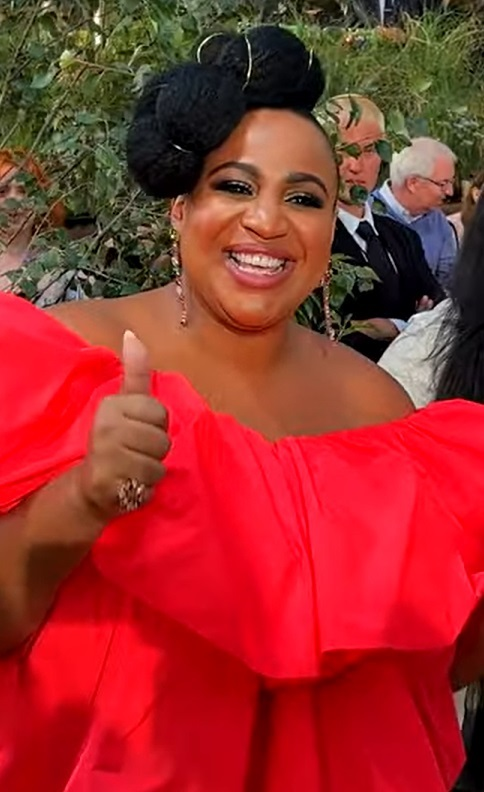
Owain Arthur and Sophia Nomvete star as Dwarves in the series
- Durin IV (portrayed by Owain Arthur):
  The prince of Khazad-dûm, who has a close relationship with Elrond. Arthur attributed the characters' onscreen relationship to the real friendship he developed with Aramayo. Durin IV is disowned by his father at the end of the first season and watches the king descend into darkness in the second. Arthur's beard, hair, and facial prosthetics took two-and-a-half hours to apply each day. The beard, which came in 16 pieces, included strands of real copper. It was supported by a hook on Arthur's costume due to its weight.
- Durin III (portrayed by Peter Mullan):
  The king of Khazad-dûm, who falls into madness in the second season after being given a Ring of Power. His actions awaken the Balrog that lives below Khazad-dûm, endangering the kingdom, until he sacrifices himself to trap the creature again. This event was originally intended for the end of the first season but could not be included then due to budgetary restrictions, which allowed the relationships between Durin IV, Disa, and Durin III to be further developed in the second season before the latter's death.
- Narvi (portrayed by Kevin Eldon): A great craftsman and architect who serves as an advisor to the king

=== Introduced in the first season ===
- Disa (portrayed by Sophia Nomvete):
  Durin IV's wife and the princess of Khazad-dûm. Arthur described the two characters as "the power couple of Middle-earth". Nomvete said Disa wants to support her husband and kingdom, but she also has her own ambitions similar to the character Lady Macbeth from William Shakespeare's play Macbeth. The character's costumes have more flowy designs than other Dwarves', taking inspiration from water running over rocks. The female Dwarves in the series were expected to have beards like the males, but the producers did not want them to lose their femininity so opted for more subtle facial hair rather than heavy beards.

=== Introduced in the second season ===
- Barduk (portrayed by Stuart Bowman): A Dwarven miner who fights with Durin IV

=== Introduced in the third season ===
- Thrain (portrayed by Eddie Marsan): The brother of Durin IV
- Gerda (portrayed by Amber Mendez-Martin): The teenage daughter of Durin and Disa
- Gamli (portrayed by Lee Braithwaite): The teenage son of Durin and Disa

== Low Men ==
=== Introduced in the first season ===
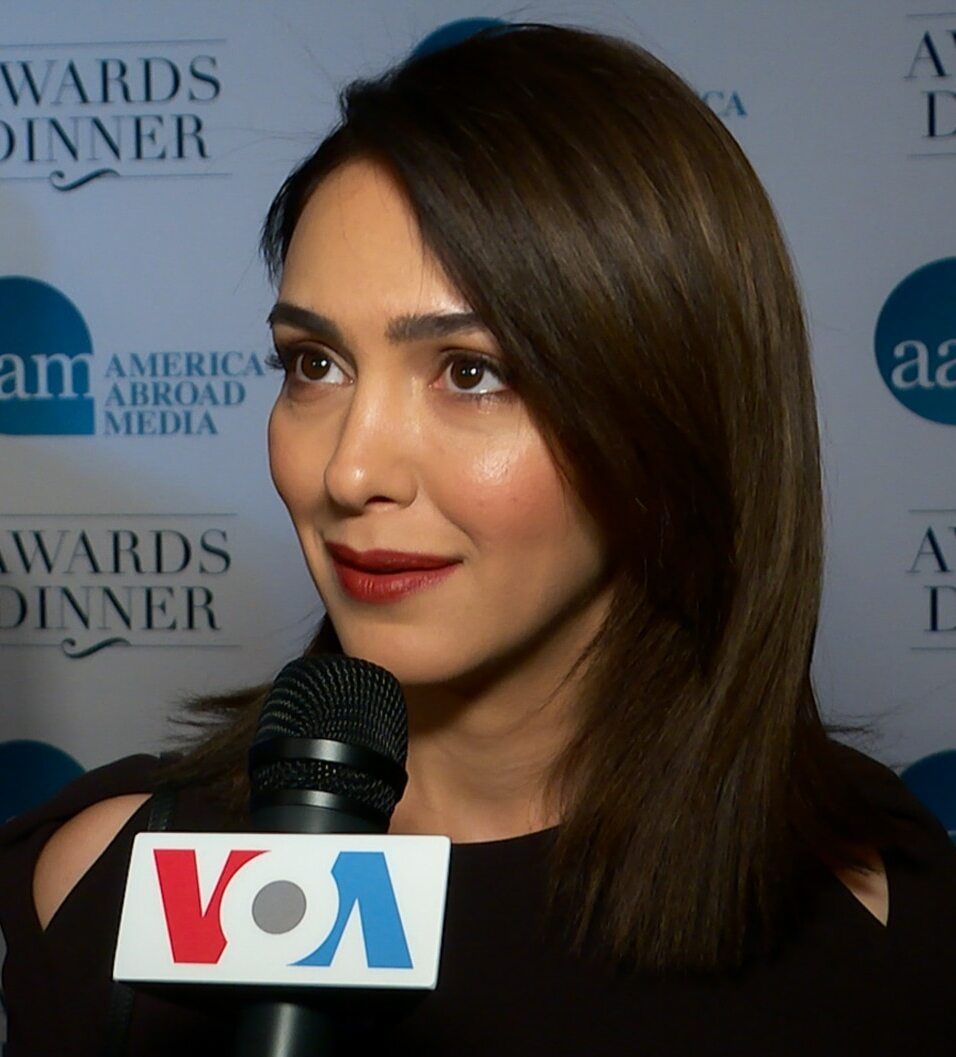
Nazanin Boniadi starred as Bronwyn in the first season, but chose not to return for the second

- Waldreg (portrayed by Geoff Morrell): A Tirharad villager who joins the Orcs. He is killed by a Warg, under the command of Sauron, in the second season.
- Tredwill (portrayed by Peter Tait): A Tirharad villager. Tait previously portrayed an Orc in the Lord of the Rings films.
- Rowan (portrayed by Ian Blackburn): A Tirharad villager who is killed by Waldreg as proof of the latter's loyalty to the Orcs
- Bronwyn (portrayed by Nazanin Boniadi):
  A single mother and healer who owns an apothecary in the village of Tirharad, and is in love with the Elf Arondir. Boniadi, an activist focused on women's rights, said she connected to the character's ideals and fight for a better world. Boniadi chose not to return for the second season and said this decision was unrelated to her choice to take a break from acting and focus on activism. The second season reveals that Bronwyn has succumbed to the poison from an Orc's arrow which she was shot with during the first season.
- Theo (portrayed by Tyroe Muhafidin):
  Bronwyn's son, who discovers a broken sword that is the key to turning the Southlands into the dark land of Mordor. Muhafidin was 15 when production began and the producers anticipated that his voice would break during filming. They planned to re-record all of his dialogue at the end of the first season. This proved to be unnecessary when the production halted early due to the COVID-19 pandemic and Muhafidin's voice dropped before filming re-started. Theo's story in the second season revolves around his grief over Bronwyn's death.

=== Introduced in the second season ===
- Diarmid (portrayed by Nicholas Woodeson): A refugee from the Southlands who carries the heraldry of their lost king. Sauron takes this heraldry from a dying Diarmid during a shipwreck.
- Estrid (portrayed by Nia Towle): A woman that Isildur encounters after the eruption of Mount Doom, who is one of the Wild Men that bear the mark of Adar
- Hagen (portrayed by Gabriel Akuwudike): One of the Wild Men who bears the mark of Adar and attacks travelers near Pelargir. He is betrothed to Estrid.

== High Men ==
=== Created by Tolkien ===
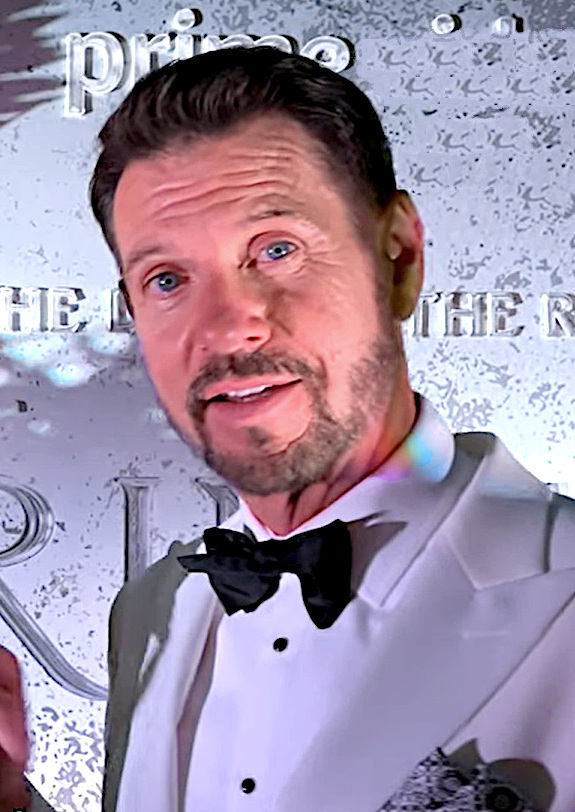
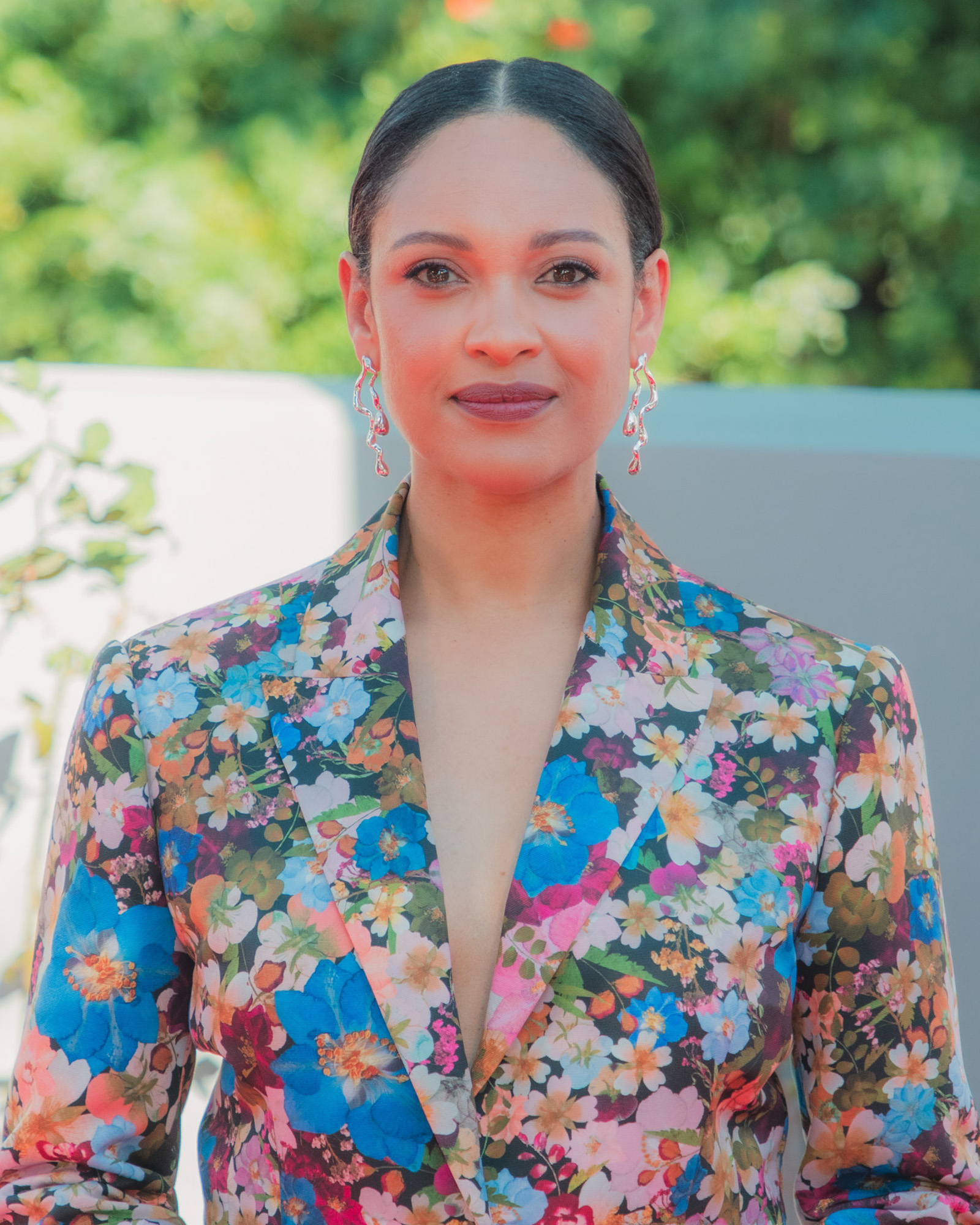
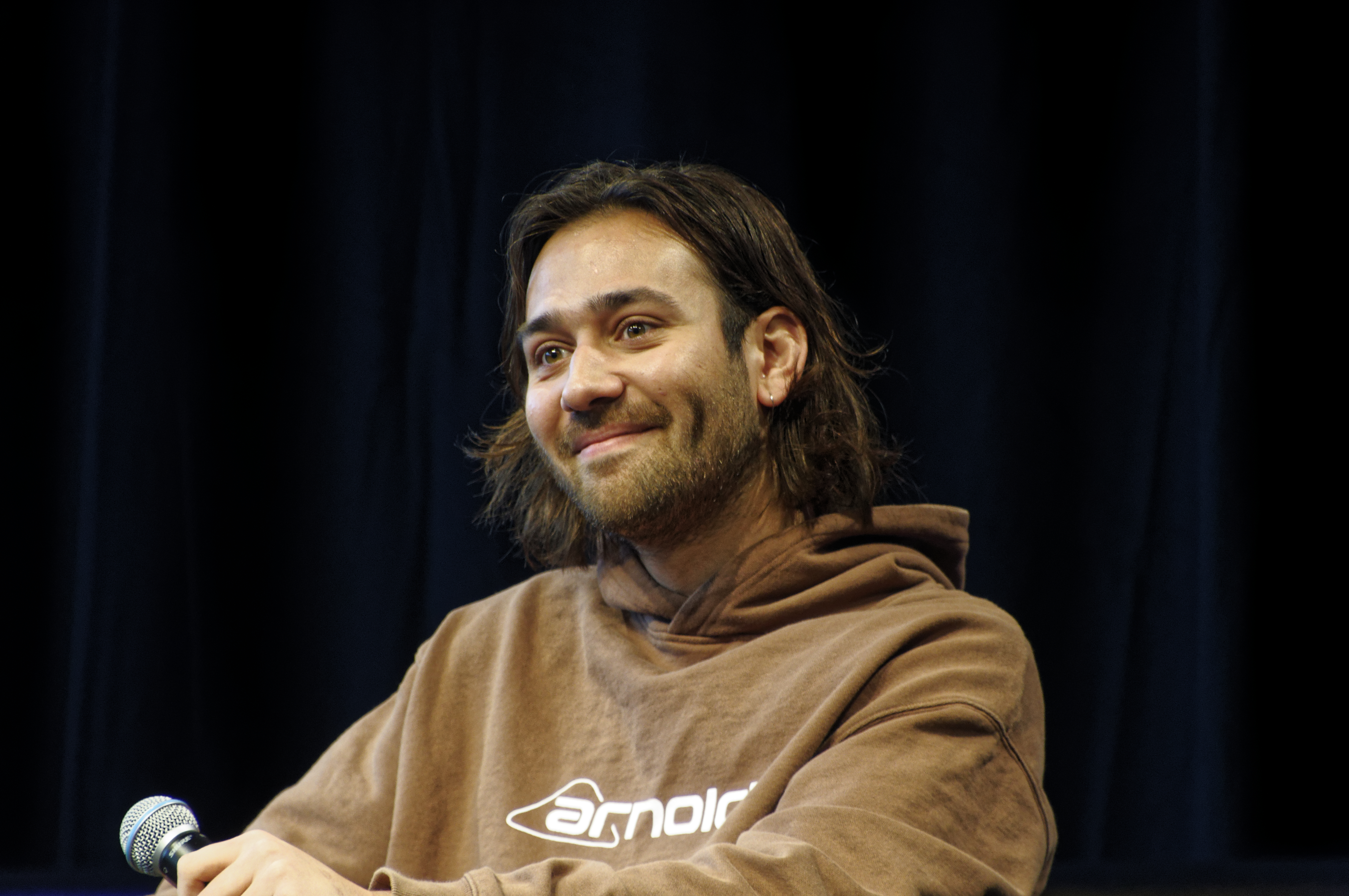
Lloyd Owen, Cynthia Addai-Robinson, and Maxim Baldry star as key characters from the island kingdom of Númenor
- Elendil (portrayed by Lloyd Owen):
  A Númenórean sailor and Isildur's father who will eventually be a leader in the last alliance between Elves and Men. Owen said the series was Elendil's hero's journey, developing him to the point where he is ready to be a leader. Elendil steps up in the second season to help Queen Míriel after she is blinded at the end of the first season.
- Míriel (portrayed by Cynthia Addai-Robinson):
  Introduced as the queen regent of Númenor, Míriel leads Númenórean forces to the Southlands of Middle-earth where they suffer heavy losses and she loses her eyesight.
- Pharazôn (portrayed by Trystan Gravelle):
  A Númenórean advisor to queen regent Míriel, who emerges as the leader of the "King's Men" contingent who are against the Elves.
- Isildur (portrayed by Maxim Baldry):
  Elendil's son who will eventually become a warrior and king. The writers wanted to explore Isildur's story more than the source material so the audience would feel that it ends in tragedy rather than foolishness. Co-showrunner Patrick McKay compared the character to Al Pacino's Michael Corleone from The Godfather (1972). Isildur is presumed dead at the end of the first season, and Baldry described the second season as forcing the character to survive and grow up, developing him into a man and a warrior.
- Tar-Palantir (portrayed by Ken Blackburn): The king of Númenor and Míriel's father who dies in the first-season finale
- Anárion (portrayed by Andrew Richardson): The younger son of Elendil
- Elros (portrayed by Robert Aramayo): Elrond's half-Elven brother who chose to be mortal and became the first king of Númenor

=== Introduced in the first season ===
- Ontamo (portrayed by Anthony Crum): A cadet in the Númenórean Sea Guard and Isildur's friend, who dies during the eruption of Mount Doom
- Valandil (portrayed by Alex Tarrant): A cadet in the Númenórean Sea Guard and Isildur's friend
- Eärien (portrayed by Ema Horvath):
  Elendil's daughter and Isildur's sister who joins the Númenórean Builder's Guild. In the second season, Eärien moves toward the opposite side of the growing Númenórean conflict than her father. Owen compared this dynamic to Elendil being religious and Eärien being an atheist. Horvath and Baldry bonded to portray siblings, including by bungee jumping and zip-lining together.
- The Sail Master (portrayed by Antonio Te Maioha): The instructor of the Númenórean Sea Guard
- Kemen (portrayed by Leon Wadham):
  Pharazôn's son. Wadham felt privileged children could outdo their parents or just "coast with a level of entitlement", and Kemen initially does the latter. He has to "interrogate what he stands for" in the series.

=== Introduced in the second season ===
- Belzagar (portrayed by Will Keen): A lord from the north of Númenor who supports Pharazôn's plan to challenge Míriel for the throne
- The High Priest (portrayed by William Chubb): A member of the Faithful

== Easterlings ==
=== Created by Tolkien ===
- Khamûl (portrayed by Zubin Varla):
  An Easterling warlord who believes his power has been usurped by the Dark Wizard, leading him to accept a Ring of Power from Sauron. He becomes one of the "Nazgnagôl" or "Ring-servants", and will eventually be corrupted into one of the "Nazgûl" or "Ringwraiths". Khamûl is the one Nazgûl whose name was revealed by Tolkien.

=== Introduced in the first season ===
- The Nomad (portrayed by Edith Poor), the Ascetic (portrayed by Kali Kopae), and the Dweller (portrayed by Bridie Sisson):
  Referred to as "The Mystics", these three women from Rhûn search for the Stranger, believing him to be Sauron and wanting to venerate him. The showrunners were inspired by the Three Witches from Shakespeare's play Macbeth when creating the characters. The Mystics are defeated by the Stranger at the end of the first season, when he banishes them to the unseen world and their true forms are revealed to be "hideous and horrible". The second season reveals that the Mystics serve the Dark Wizard, who uses the blood of one of his acolytes to summon the Dweller and express disapproval of her failure to capture the Stranger.

=== Introduced in the second season ===
- Brânk (portrayed by Zates Atour): The leader of the Gaudrim, riders who wear masks to hide the "curse upon their flesh". He offers to capture the Stranger for the Dark Wizard.
- Kilta (portrayed by Arkie Reece): A member of the Gaudrim who hunts the Stranger and his companions

== Halflings ==
=== Introduced in the first season ===
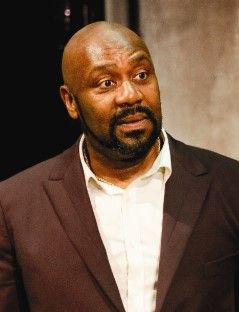
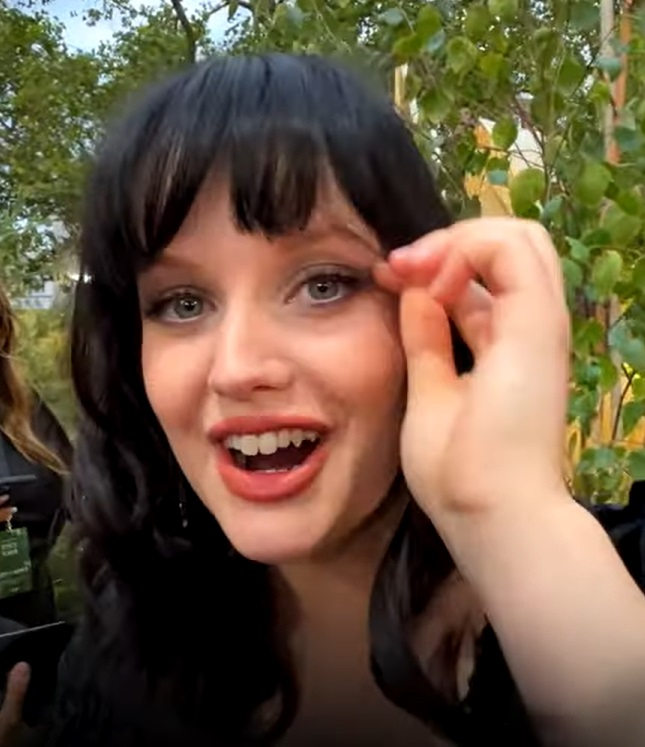
Lenny Henry and Markella Kavenagh portray Harfoots in the series
- Sadoc Burrows (portrayed by Lenny Henry): The leader of the Harfoots, who is killed by the Mystics at the end of the first season
- Marigold Brandyfoot (portrayed by Sara Zwangobani): A Harfoot and Nori's stepmother
- Malva (portrayed by Thusitha Jayasundera): A Harfoot who advocates for leaving behind the Brandyfoot family
- Vilma (portrayed by Maxine Cunliffe): A Harfoot
- Largo Brandyfoot (portrayed by Dylan Smith): A Harfoot and Nori's father
- Elanor "Nori" Brandyfoot (portrayed by Markella Kavenagh):
  A Harfoot with a "yearning for adventure". She develops a "Tolkienian relationship" with the Stranger, similar to that between the Hobbit Frodo Baggins and the Wizard Gandalf in The Lord of the Rings. Kavenagh wanted Nori to remain aware of her family responsibilities and not become selfish in her ambitions. Nori travels with the Stranger to Rhûn in the second season; Kavenagh related to her character's excitement in visiting the new land due to her own excitement at filming on location in the Canary Islands.
- Dilly Brandyfoot (portrayed by Beau Cassidy): A Harfoot and Nori's sister
- Poppy Proudfellow (portrayed by Megan Richards):
  An orphaned Harfoot and Nori's best friend, who is driven by her loyalty to Nori. Richards said Poppy has personal growth in the second season as she travels with Nori and the Stranger to Rhûn.

=== Introduced in the second season ===
- Merimac (portrayed by Gavi Singh Chera): A Stoor who Nori and Poppy encounter in the desert, also known as "Nobody"
- Gundabale Earthauler (portrayed by Tanya Moodie): The leader of the Stoors who is focused on keeping her community alive and safe

== Orcs and Trolls ==
=== Introduced in the first season ===
- A Snow-troll is encountered by Galadriel in an abandoned fortress in the northern wastelands of Forodwaith
- Adar (portrayed by Joseph Mawle in season 1, Sam Hazeldine in season 2):
  A corrupted Elf, one of the first Orcs, and their current leader, who creates the land of Mordor so the Orcs can live free from their enemies and Sauron. Adar prefers the term "Uruk", the name for Orcs in Black Speech, an idea that came from Mawle who personally disliked the word "Orc" being used on set. Hazeldine had worked with Mawle before taking over the role. He felt they did not look like each other, but said this was mitigated by the character's heavy prosthetics. The prosthetics initially took seven hours to apply but this was eventually reduced to five. Hazeldine said his biggest challenge was speaking in Black Speech. However, he asked for more of his lines to be translated into the language because he felt that was appropriate for the character.
- Vrath (portrayed by Jed Brophy): An Orc who serves Adar. Brophy previously played multiple Orcs in the Lord of the Rings films and had a supporting role as the Dwarf Nori in the Hobbit films.

=== Introduced in the second season ===
- Glûg (portrayed by Robert Strange):
  An Orc who serves Adar, but who does not blindly follow orders and has his own motivations related to his family. The showrunners described Glûg as the "Orc with an arc" for the second season, using him to further explore ideas about Orcs being more complex than the audience might expect. Strange previously played multiple Orcs in the first season.
- Damrod (voiced by Benjamin Walker in "The Eagle and the Sceptre", Jason Smith in "Doomed to Die"):
  A Hill-troll who joins Adar's forces, described as an "eater of Dragon bones". He is killed by Arondir, Elrond, and Gil-galad during the Siege of Eregion. Smith is the visual effects supervisor for the series and provided reference for the character's movements, which were inspired by Jonathan Banks's Mike Ehrmantraut from the television series Breaking Bad (2008–2013) and Better Call Saul (2015–2022).

=== Introduced in the third season ===
- Marnûkh (portrayed by Adam Young): A mysterious Orc

== Maiar ==
=== Created by Tolkien ===
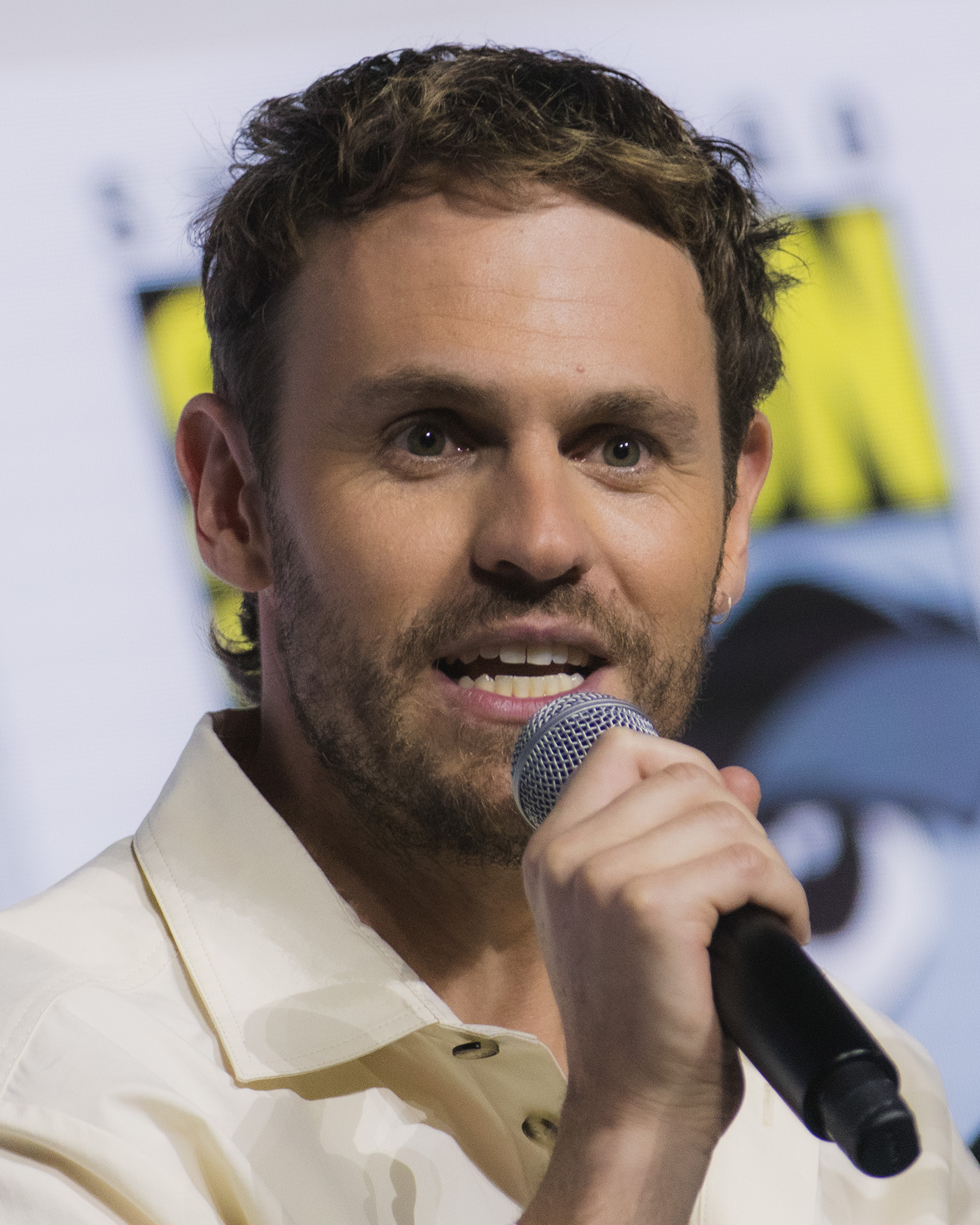
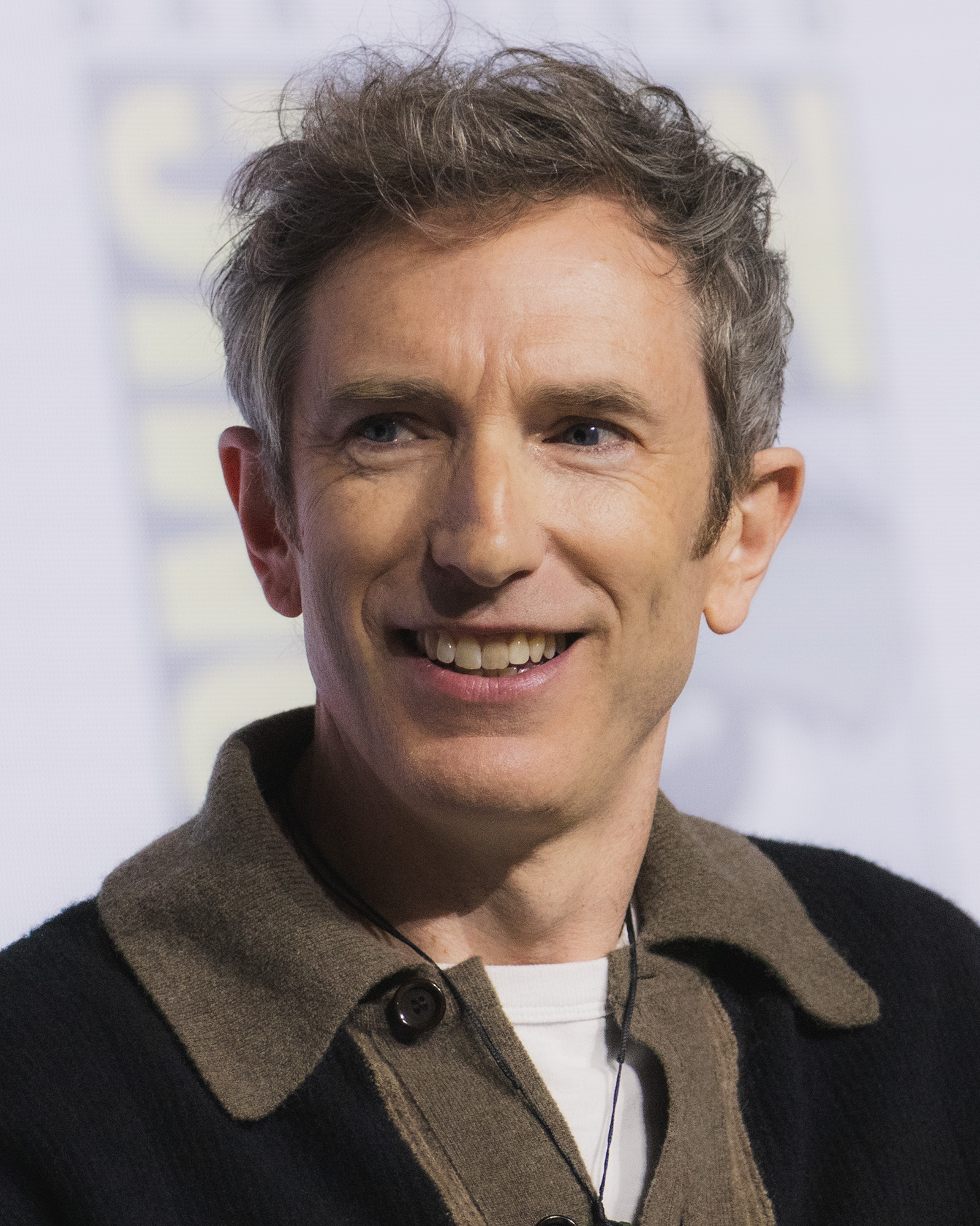
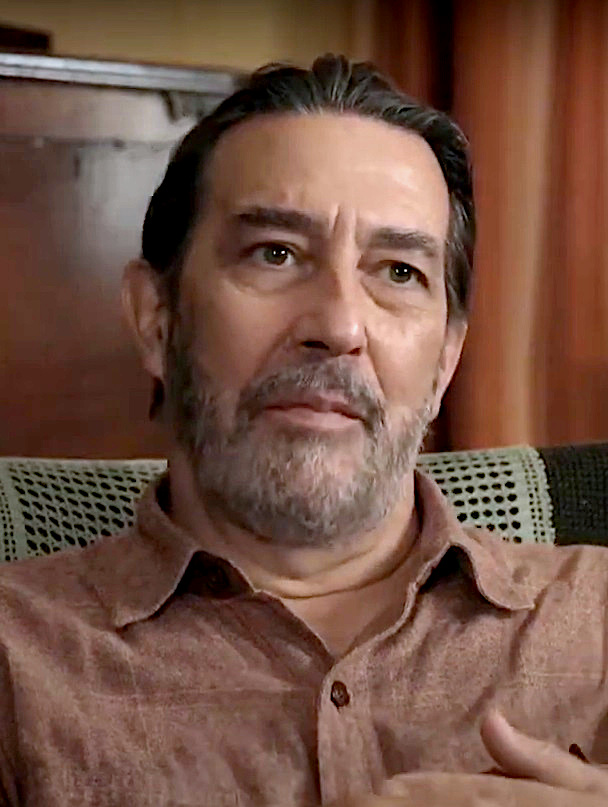
Charlie Vickers stars as the Dark Lord Sauron while Daniel Weyman and Ciarán Hinds portray Wizards
- Gandalf (portrayed by Daniel Weyman):
  One of the Istari (Wizards) who falls from the sky in a flaming meteor and befriends the Harfoot Nori. Wizards are primarily associated with the Third Age, but they do travel to Middle-earth before then in some of Tolkien's writings, and the showrunners wanted to have a "Tolkienian relationship" between a Wizard and a halfling similar to Gandalf and Frodo Baggins in The Lord of the Rings. The character is initially called "The Stranger" and there was speculation about his identity. The first-season finale confirms that he is a Wizard and references dialogue spoken by Gandalf in The Lord of the Rings, but he is not confirmed to be Gandalf until the second-season finale. The showrunners said they were unsure which Wizard he would be at first, but they decided that Gandalf—who they called "Lord of the Rings's most beloved character"—was the right choice after establishing the Stranger's connection with halflings and Tom Bombadil.
- Sauron (portrayed by Charlie Vickers):
  The shapeshifting former lieutenant of the Dark Lord Morgoth who disguises himself as the human Halbrand and the Elf Annatar, the "Lord of Gifts", to deceive the people of Middle-earth. Payne explained that Sauron sees himself as a hero who wants to "heal and rehabilitate Middle-earth" by controlling its people using the Rings of Power. The Halbrand disguise was created for the series as a way for the showrunners to deceive the audience just as Sauron deceives the other characters, leading up to the reveal that Halbrand is Sauron at the end of the first season. McKay felt the second season's focus on Sauron as Annatar would be more impactful because of the time he spent with other characters in the first season when he was posing as Halbrand, compared to if they started the series with Sauron as a prominent antagonist. Jack Lowden portrays Sauron's previous form in a flashback during the second season.
- Durin's Bane (voiced by Simon Pegg):
  A Balrog, a demonic servant of Morgoth whose form is of fire and shadow. In Tolkien's history, Durin's Bane sleeps beneath Khazad-dûm until being disturbed by the Dwarves greedily mining for mithril during the Third Age. In The Rings of Power, Durin's Bane is first awoken during the Second Age, by the actions of King Durin III. A confrontation between the two characters was one of the earliest ideas conceived for the series, and takes place in the second-season finale. The showrunners said Durin III puts "the genie back in the bottle—at least for now" when he sacrifices himself fighting the Balrog while a cavern collapses around them.
- The Dark Wizard (portrayed by Ciarán Hinds):
  One of the Istari who has been corrupted. The showrunners confirmed that he is one of the five Wizards from Tolkien's writings, but denied speculation that he is Saruman due to that character's corruption not coming until later in Tolkien's history. They intended for the audience to learn more about the character as Gandalf does, and Payne said "for now he's defined not by his title or name, but by his deeds—which are dark". In the third season he is revealed to be Pallando, one of the two Blue Wizards.

== Other beings ==
=== Created by Tolkien ===
- Morgoth: The first Dark Lord who fought the free peoples of Middle-earth during the First Age
- Tom Bombadil (portrayed by Rory Kinnear):
  A whimsical and mysterious figure who the Stranger encounters in the land of Rhûn. The showrunners chose to include Tom after he was excluded from previous The Lord of the Rings adaptations. Kinnear took inspiration from his young daughter to capture the character's child-like energy and chose to use the Cornish dialect to differentiate Tom from the series' other characters and reflect that he is "like the oldest part of Britain".
- Goldberry (voiced by Raya Yarbrough): Tom Bombadil's wife who is known as the daughter of the Withywindle river. Yarbrough is the wife of series composer Bear McCreary.

=== Introduced in the second season ===
- Snaggleroot (voiced by Jim Broadbent): An Ent, a tree-like being known as a shepherd of the forest
- Winterbloom (voiced by Olivia Williams): An Entwife. The Ents have lost the Entwives by the events of The Lord of the Rings, so the series is an opportunity to show the Entwives onscreen.

== See also ==
- List of Middle-earth characters
- Middle-earth peoples
