= Charlotte Brändström =

Swedish-French film director (active 1984– )

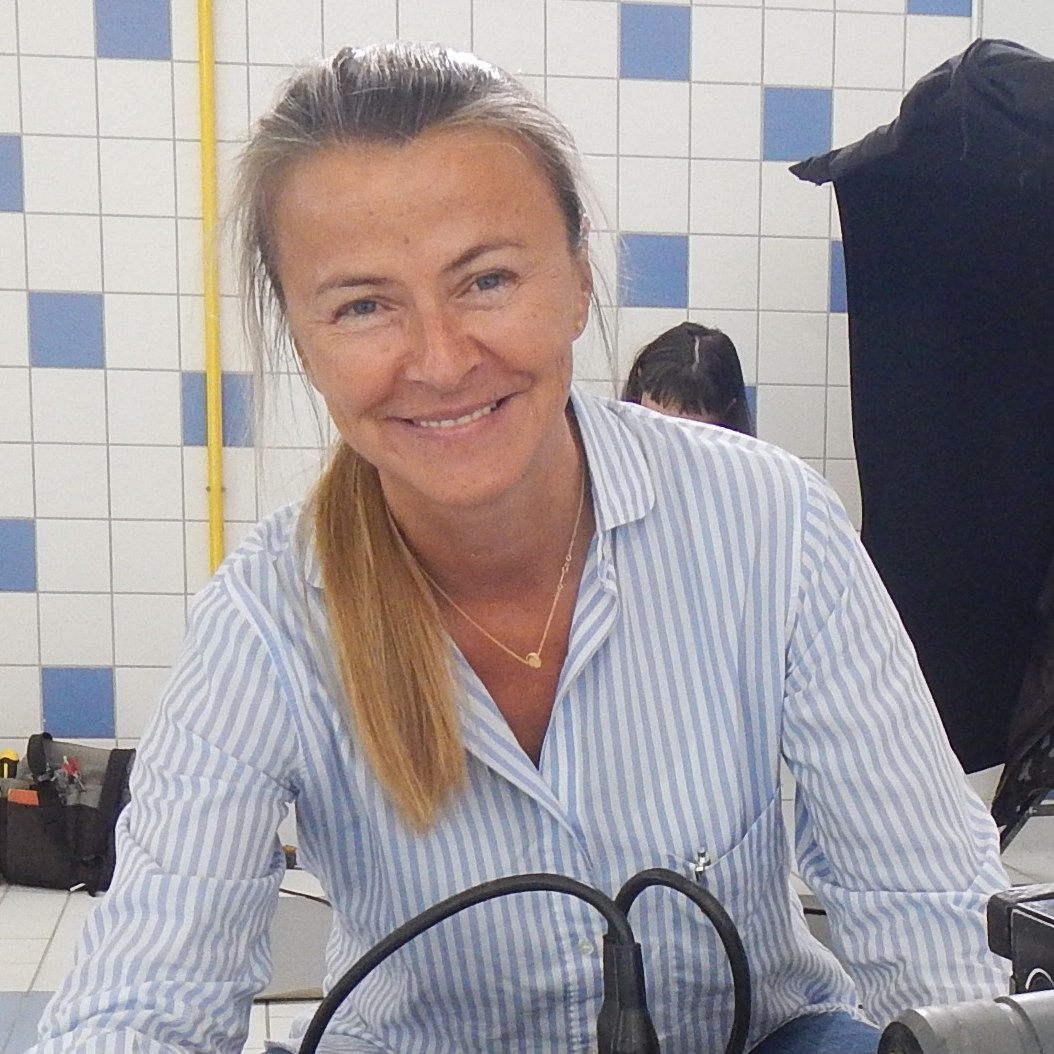
- Charlotte Brändström, 2014
- Born: Paris, France
- Occupation: Director
- Years active: 1984–present

Charlotte Brändström is a Swedish-French film and TV director.

== Early life ==
Born in Paris to Swedish parents, Charlotte Brändström graduated from the American Film Institute (AFI) in Los Angeles.

== Filmography ==
Film

Year	Title	Director	Writer	Notes
1986	Magic Horses	Yes	No	Documentary
1989	Un été d'orages	Yes	Yes	Los Angeles Women in Film Festival - Excellence in Feature Film
1990	Sweet Revenge	Yes	No	
1991	Road to Ruin	Yes	No	
1994	A Business Affair	Yes	Yes	

TV movies

- Ils n'ont pas 20 ans (1995)
- Le cheval de coeur (1996)
- Drôle de père (1998)
- Le monde à l'envers (1999)
- La femme de mon mari (2000)
- Un couple modèle (2001)
- Une Ferrari pour deux (2002)
- Une villa pour deux (2003)
- Alerte à Paris! (2006)
- Opération Rainbow Warrior (2006)
- Le fantôme de mon ex (2007)
- Ma fille est innocente (2007)
- L'affaire Bruay-en-Artois (2008)
- De sang et d'encre (2008)
- Aveugle mais pas trop (2009)
- Trahie! (2010)
- Bleu catacombes (2013)

TV series

Year	Title	Notes
1997	Julie Lescaut	2 episodes
1999	Manège	1 episode
2001	Brigade spéciale	3 episodes Festival du Film Policier de Cognac - Grand Prix; Festival du Film Policier de Cognac - Grand Prix Téléfilm
2002	Le juge est une femme	1 episode Festival du Film Policier de Cognac - Grand Prix; Festival du Film Policier de Cognac - Grand Prix Téléfilm
2003	Fargas	1 episode
2004	Julie, chevalier de Maupin	Miniseries; Luchon International Film Festival - Grand Prize Series; Nominated - International Emmy Award for best TV movie or miniseries
2010	Les Dames	1 episode
2011	La loi selon Bartoli	1 episode
2012	Kodnamn Lisa	1 episode
2012	Spelets regler	1 episode
2013	Wallander	2 episodes
2014	Vaugand	2 episodes
2015	Chicago P.D.	1 episode
2015	The Disappearance	8 episodes
2016	Arrow	1 episode
2016	Grey's Anatomy	1 episode
2016	Tyrant	1 episode
2016	Madam Secretary	3 episodes
2017	Outlander	2 episodes
2017–18	Colony	2 episodes
2018	FBI	1 episode
2018	Conspiracy of Silence	Also executive producer 8 episodes
2018	Counterpart	2 episodes
2019	The Witcher	2 episodes
2020	The Outsider	Episode "Tigers and Bears"
2020	Away	2 episodes
2021	Jupiter's Legacy	2 episodes
2022–present	The Lord of the Rings: The Rings of Power	7 episodes
2023	The Continental: From the World of John Wick	1 episode
2024	Shōgun	"Chapter Three: Tomorrow Is Tomorrow"
2026	Scarpetta	3 episodes
