= Charlie Vickers =

Australian actor

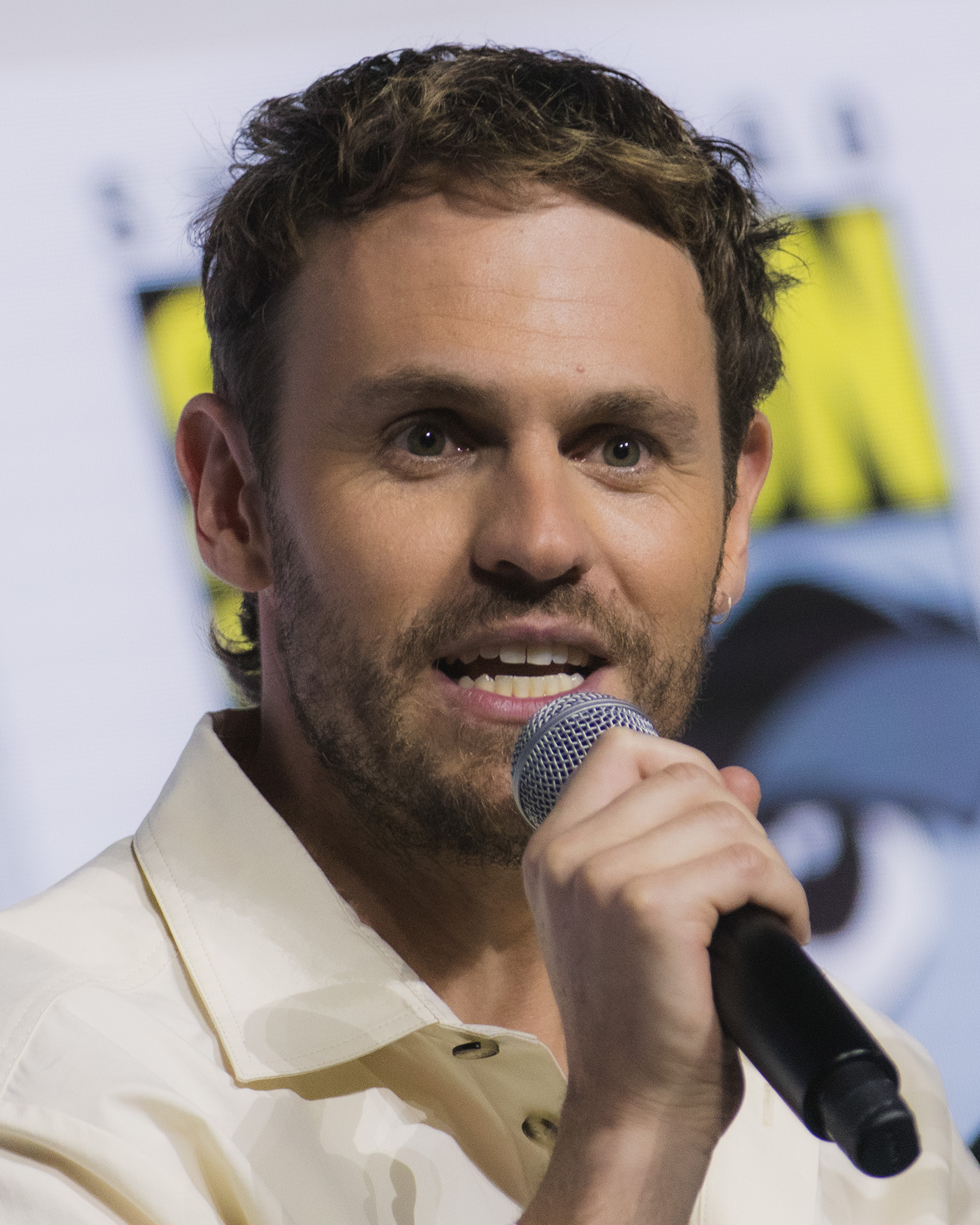
- Vickers in 2026
- Born: Charlie Vickers-Willis; 1992 (age 33–34); Melbourne, Victoria, Australia
- Occupation: Actor
- Years active: 2018–present

Charlie Vickers is an Australian actor. He plays Sauron in the Amazon Prime fantasy series The Lord of the Rings: The Rings of Power.

== Early life and education ==
Charlie Vickers was born in St Kilda, Melbourne, Australia. He grew up in Geelong and attended Geelong Grammar School. In 2010, his graduating year, he served as school captain and received the Juan Jose Garcia Prize for Drama.

Vickers studied for an arts degree at RMIT University in Melbourne. He took part in amateur theatre, performing in Queen's College MADS productions as the Judge in Stephen Sondheim's Sweeney Todd and as Basil Fawlty in Fawlty Towers.

Vickers moved to London, England to attend the Royal Central School of Speech and Drama. He graduated in 2018.

== Career ==
Vickers played the youngest son of the Pazzi family in eight episodes of the Netflix television series Medici. He starred in Rachel Ward's comedy-drama film Palm Beach alongside Sam Neill, Matilda Brown, Greta Scacchi and Richard E. Grant.

In 2019, Vickers was cast in the main role of Sauron in the J. R. R. Tolkien-based Amazon television series The Lord of the Rings: The Rings of Power. He first appeared in the second episode of the series. Initially, his character is known as Halbrand, which is an alias adopted by Sauron during a period when he has taken human form. Vickers has said he was unaware he was playing the role of Sauron until he filmed the third episode of the series. To immerse himself in the part, Vickers went hiking for five days in the Tongariro National Park, New Zealand. To prepare for performing the underwater scenes, Vickers took up freediving. Vickers is a keen runner, having completed several triathlons; he takes 5–10 km (3.1–6.2 mi) runs several times a week.

In 2023, Vickers starred as Clem Hart in a miniseries adaptation of the Holly Ringland novel, The Lost Flowers of Alice Hart.

Vickers also starred in the 2025 Netflix miniseries adaptation of Jane Harper's novel, The Survivors.

Vickers is starring in the thriller film Death in Shoreditch. As of June 2025, the film is still in post-production.

== Filmography ==
=== Films ===
Year	Title	Role	Notes
2019	Palm Beach	Dan	
2020	Death in Shoreditch	Andrew	In post-production
TBA	Playback	Franklin	

=== Television ===
Year	Title	Role	Notes
2018	Medici	Guglielmo Pazzi	Recurring role (season 2); 8 episodes
2022–present	The Lord of the Rings: The Rings of Power	Halbrand / Annatar / Sauron	Main role; 15 episodes
2023	The Lost Flowers of Alice Hart	Clem Hart	Main role; 7 episodes
2025	The Survivors	Kieran Elliott	Main role; 6 episodes
