= J. D. Payne and Patrick McKay =

American screenwriter duo

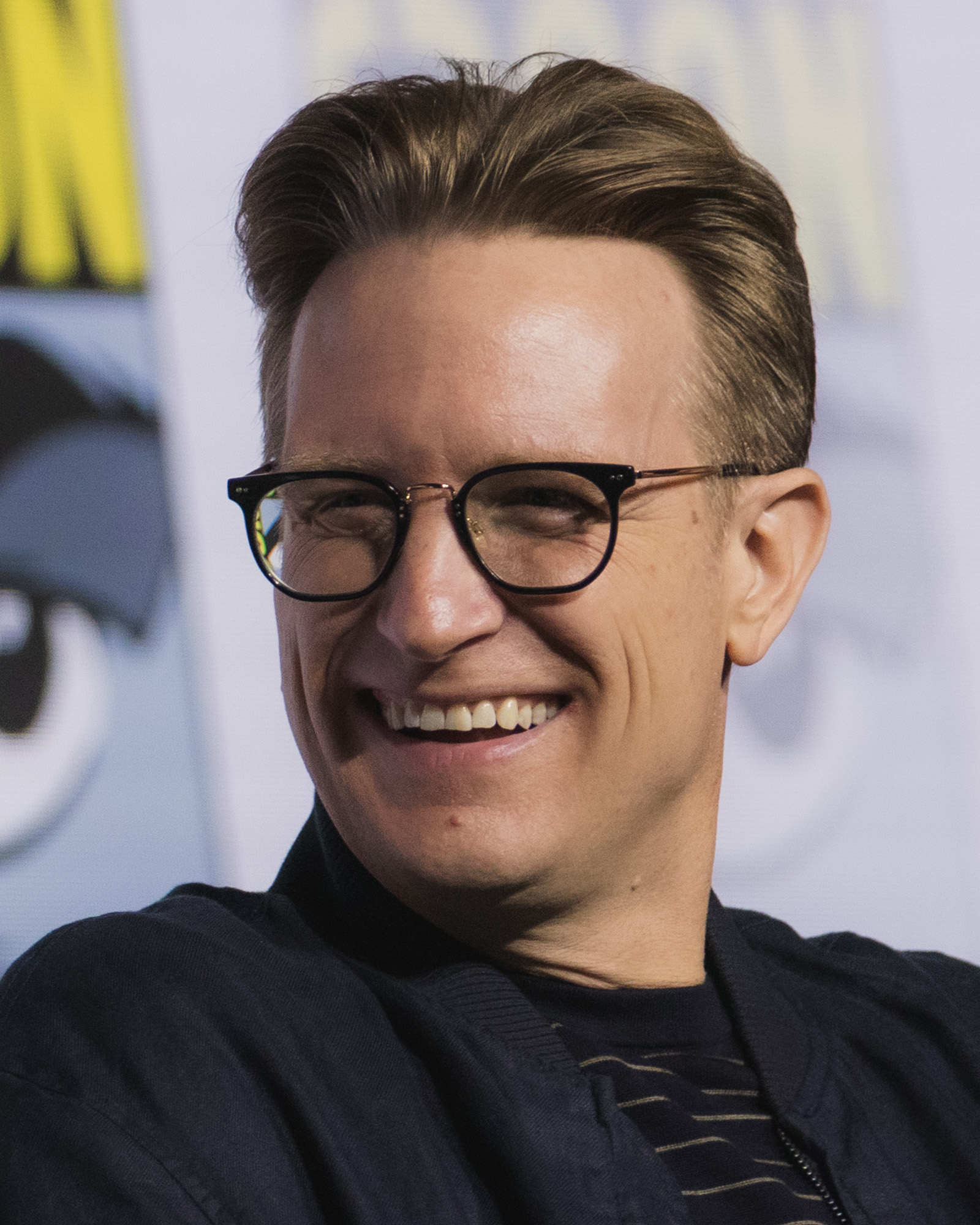
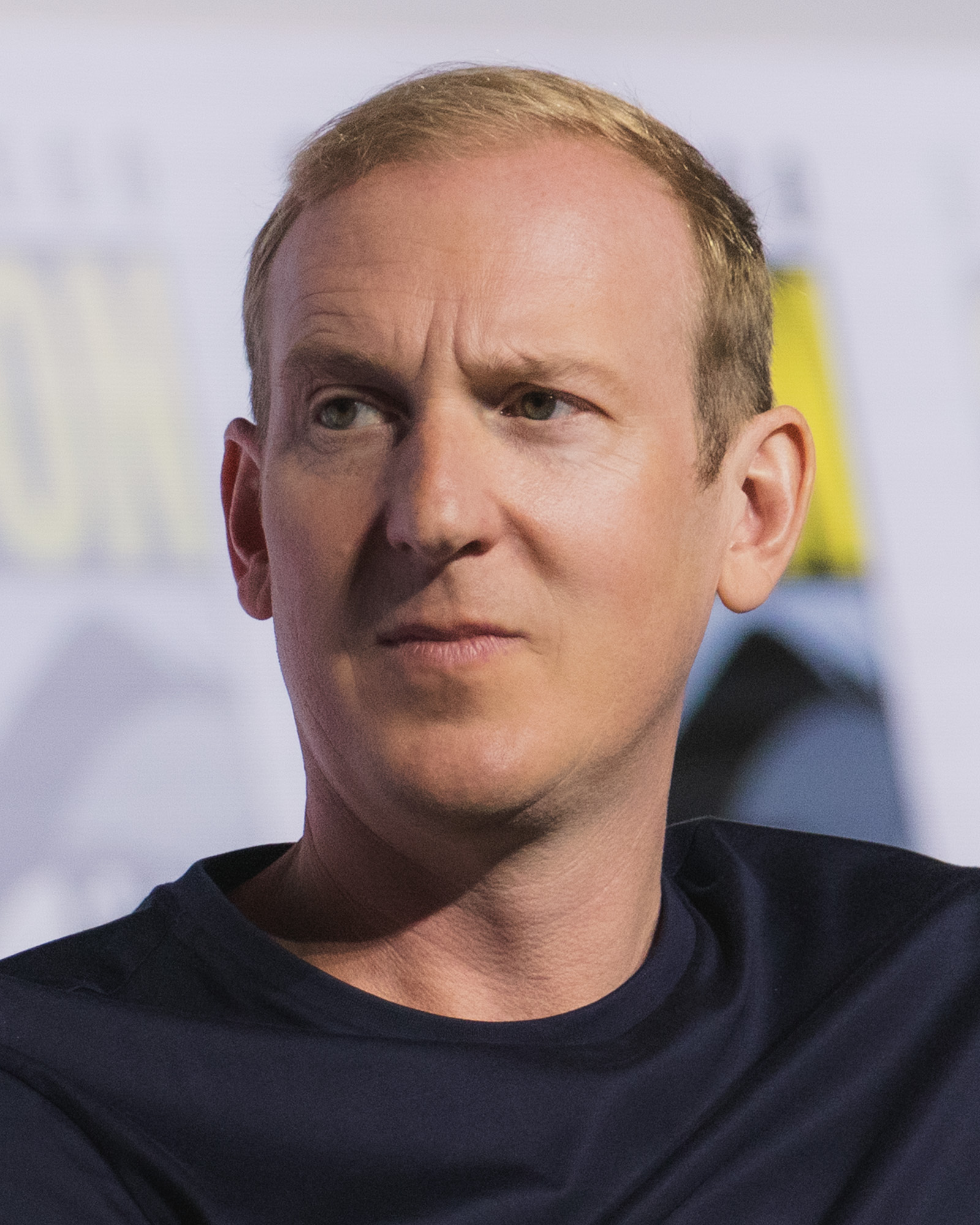
- Payne (left), McKay (right) in 2026
- Born: Payne: 1979 or 1980 (age 46–47); McKay: 1980 or 1981 (age 45–46); McLean, Virginia
- Education: Payne: Yale University; McKay: Stonehill College; American University
- Occupations: Writers; producers
- Years active: 1997–present
- Known for: The Lord of the Rings: The Rings of Power
- Spouse: Payne: Rachel Payne
- Children: Payne: 2; McKay: 2

John D. Payne (b. 1979 or 1980) and Patrick McKay (b. 1980 or 1981) are an American screenwriting duo. They are best known for developing the Amazon Prime Video fantasy drama series The Lord of the Rings: The Rings of Power, based on the history of Middle-earth by English author J. R. R. Tolkien.

== Early life ==
Payne and McKay are originally from McLean, Virginia. The two met in 1997 on their high school debate team, and directed a short play that Payne wrote for their school's festival. Payne attended Yale University and studied English Literature, graduating with honors. McKay attended Stonehill College and studied Theater Arts, and American University, where he received an MFA in Creative Writing.

== Career ==
Their script Midas helped them get agency representation and management. In August 2010, they sold their first ever script Goliath to Relativity Media. Scott Derrickson was set to direct the project for Relativity. In 2011, they were hired to write Deadliest Warrior for Paramount based on the Deadliest Warrior Spike television series.

After writing Deadliest Warrior, Payne and McKay went to work for Bad Robot. There, they wrote Boilerplate, which is based on the novel of the same name, and Micronauts. After, the duo wrote Law Zero for Warner Bros.

In December 2013, they were hired to write Star Trek Beyond with Roberto Orci. Their script was later rewritten by Simon Pegg and Doug Jung.

In April 2014, the two were hired to write a new reboot of Flash Gordon (in development) for 20th Century Fox.

In July 2016, the duo were hired to write the fourth Star Trek film after working on Beyond. They later revealed that the plot was inspired by 2001: A Space Odyssey, and involved character James Kirk meeting his father George Kirk, but they were the same age because of a "cosmic quirk" in the Star Trek universe. When the project fell apart after two and a half years, it pushed Payne and McKay to "start taking TV seriously. That led us to Rings of Power."

Payne and McKay joined the Godzilla vs. Kong writers' room in March 2017. Four months later, they were announced to have written the most recent draft of Disney's Jungle Cruise. In August, they were set to write A People's History Of The Vampire Uprising for Fox and 21 Laps.

The two were hired to write Amazon's Lord of the Rings series in July 2018. They were confirmed as showrunners in July 2019. To develop the series, Payne and McKay believed J. R. R. Tolkien's lesser-known Second Age was the key. They worked together to map out five seasons of television that told the first five minutes of the prologue in The Lord of the Rings: The Fellowship of the Ring. After their first pitch to Amazon, they got a call to return, but they had to pitch all five seasons of the series. The two mapped out the series at Payne's assistant's apartment, and successfully pitched the show. Afterwards, they were called back for seven more pitches. In initial meetings with the Tolkien Estate, Payne quoted Tolkien and greeted Simon Tolkien in Elvish. Their idea for the series lined up with Simon Tolkien's vision, and their former boss J. J. Abrams recommended them to Amazon.

In February 2022, they set up their 2017 Black List script Escape with The Hideaway Entertainment, with James Watkins to direct the film. In February 2024, they signed a three-year exclusive overall deal with Amazon MGM Studios with their production company 10:40 PM Productions.

== Personal life ==
McKay is married with two children. Payne is married to actress and opera singer Rachel Payne, and has two children, Adam and Ethan. Payne is a member of the Church of Jesus Christ of Latter-day Saints.

== Filmography ==
Year	Title	Notes
2016	Star Trek Beyond	Uncredited
2021	Godzilla vs. Kong	Uncredited
2021	Jungle Cruise	Uncredited
2022–present	The Lord of the Rings: The Rings of Power	Developers, wrote 11 episodes
