= Kant Pan =

- Occupation(s): Sound editor, film editor

Kant Pan is a sound and film editor. At the beginning of his career he worked as an assistant film editor for Giro City, Clockwise, Never Say Never Again and also David Cronenberg's The Fly. Later, working from London, UK, he worked as a sound editor on Wish You Were Here, Dangerous Liaisons (Stephen Frears) and We're No Angels (Neil Jordan). He then was nominated for an Oscar for his editing on Neil Jordan's The Crying Game (1992). Recent editing credits include Boogie Woogie, Forget me not and Marcel Grant's films What's your name 41?, Monsieur Francois and Just Inès.

== Personal life ==
Kant Pan was born in Hong Kong and raised in Malaysia and Singapore. He received his formative film experience, working in the vibrant Hong Kong/Asian film industry and worked on locations in Japan, Philippines, Thailand and Singapore. After graduating in psychology at the University of Hong Kong, he came to London and trained in the art and technique of film production at London Film School.

He has worked in the British film industry as assistant film editor, supervising sound editor and film editor. In his work as film editor and supervising sound editor, he has creatively collaborated in feature film projects helmed by British and European directors such as Marcel Grant, Stephen Frears, Neil Jordan, Mike Newell, Paul Morrison, Dominique Derruderre, Rudolf van den Berg to name a few.
