= Familles je vous hais =

- Directed by: Bruno Bontzolakis
- Written by: Bruno Bontzolakis
- Produced by: Jérôme Vidal
- Starring: Caroline Ducey
- Cinematography: Bruno Niveau; Miguel Sanchez-Martin
- Edited by: Joseph Guinvarch
- Music by: Nicolas Ducron
- Production company: Quo Vadis Cinéma
- Distributed by: Les Films de l'Atalante
- Release date: 15 October 1997
- Running time: 78 minutes
- Country: France
- Language: French

Familles je vous hais is a 1997 French comedy drama film directed and written by Bruno Bontzolakis, starring Caroline Ducey

== Plot ==
The film deals with the struggle by the 17-year-old Jessica (Caroline Ducey) trying to reconcile her love for her father with the hatred she has for his right-wing politics.

== Cast ==
- Caroline Ducey as Jessica
- Yvan Kolnik as Thierry
- Denis Cacheux as Jessica's father
- Olivier Brabant as Régis
- Marie Boitel as Jessica's mother
- Nadine Pouilly as Thierry's mother

== Awards ==
Caroline Ducey was nominated for the Prix Michel Simon for her performance in the film.
