= The Lord of the Rings: The Rings of Power =

American fantasy television series

- Genre: Action; Adventure; Drama; Fantasy
- Based on: The Lord of the Rings and appendices by J. R. R. Tolkien
- Developed by: J. D. Payne; Patrick McKay
- Showrunners: J. D. Payne; Patrick McKay
- Theme music composer: Howard Shore
- Composer: Bear McCreary
- Country of origin: United States
- Original language: English
- No. of seasons: 3
- No. of episodes: 22

Production
- Executive producers: J. D. Payne; Patrick McKay; Lindsey Weber; Callum Greene; Justin Doble; Gennifer Hutchison; Jason Cahill; J. A. Bayona; Belén Atienza; Eugene Kelly; Bruce Richmond; Sharon Tal Yguado; Charlotte Brändström; Kate Hazell
- Producers: Ron Ames; Chris Newman; Matthew Penry-Davey
- Production locations: New Zealand; United Kingdom
- Running time: 61–76 minutes
- Production companies: Amazon MGM Studios; New Line Cinema

Original release
- Network: Amazon Prime Video
- Release: September 1, 2022 – present

The Lord of the Rings: The Rings of Power is an American fantasy television series developed by J. D. Payne and Patrick McKay for the streaming service Amazon Prime Video. It is based on J. R. R. Tolkien's history of Middle-earth, primarily material from the appendices of the novel The Lord of the Rings (1954–55). The series is set thousands of years before the novel and depicts the major events of Middle-earth's Second Age. It is produced by Amazon MGM Studios in association with New Line Cinema.

Amazon acquired the television rights for The Lord of the Rings from the Tolkien Estate in November 2017, making a five-season production commitment worth at least US$1 billion. This would make it the most expensive television series ever made. Payne and McKay were hired in July 2018 for their first credited roles. Their story bridges Second Age references in the appendices with original material, developed in consultation with the estate and Tolkien lore experts. Per Amazon's deal with the estate, the series is not a continuation of Peter Jackson's The Lord of the Rings (2001–2003) and The Hobbit (2012–2014) film trilogies. Despite this, the producers intended to evoke the films using similar production design, younger versions of film characters, and a main theme by Howard Shore who composed the music for both trilogies. Bear McCreary composed the series' original score.

A large international cast was hired and filming for the eight-episode first season took place in New Zealand, where the films were made, from February 2020 to August 2021. This included a production break of several months due to the COVID-19 pandemic. Amazon moved production for future seasons to the United Kingdom: filming for the second season took place from October 2022 to June 2023, finishing amid the 2023 Writers Guild of America strike; and filming for the third season began by May 2025 and wrapped by mid-December. A fourth season is in development and set to begin filming in early 2027.

The Lord of the Rings: The Rings of Power premiered on September 1, 2022. The first season was released through October and became the most-watched of any Prime Video original series. It received generally positive reviews from critics, particularly for its visuals and designs, but there were criticisms for the writing and pacing. The audience response included vocal responses from Tolkien fans and an online backlash to the diverse cast. The second season, released from August to October 2024, was met with lower viewership, a similar critical response, and an improved audience response. The third season is being released in November 2026.

== Premise ==
The Lord of the Rings: The Rings of Power is based on J. R. R. Tolkien's history of Middle-earth. Set thousands of years before the novels The Hobbit (1937) and The Lord of the Rings (1954–55), the series covers the major events of Middle-earth's Second Age, beginning after the defeat of the "Dark Lord" Morgoth and his army of Orcs. The large cast of characters includes Elves, Dwarves, Men, and Harfoots, the last being precursors to the diminutive Hobbits from The Hobbit and The Lord of the Rings. In the Second Age, Morgoth's lieutenant Sauron rises as a new Dark Lord; the magical Rings of Power are forged; Númenor, a great island kingdom of Men, falls; and a last alliance between Elves and Men is formed to defeat Sauron. These events take place over thousands of years in Tolkien's works but are condensed to a short time period for the series.

== Episodes ==
Season	Episodes	Originally released	
Season	Episodes	First released	Last released
1	8	September 1, 2022	October 14, 2022
2	8	August 29, 2024	October 3, 2024
3	8	November 11, 2026	November 24, 2026

=== Season 1 (2022) ===
No. overall	No. in season	Title	Directed by	Written by	Original release date
1	1	"A Shadow of the Past"	J. A. Bayona	J. D. Payne & Patrick McKay	September 1, 2022
2	2	"Adrift"	J. A. Bayona	Gennifer Hutchison	September 1, 2022
3	3	"Adar"	Wayne Che Yip	Jason Cahill and Justin Doble	September 9, 2022
4	4	"The Great Wave"	Wayne Che Yip	Stephany Folsom and J. D. Payne & Patrick McKay	September 16, 2022
5	5	"Partings"	Wayne Che Yip	Justin Doble	September 23, 2022
6	6	"Udûn"	Charlotte Brändström	Nicholas Adams & Justin Doble and J. D. Payne & Patrick McKay	September 30, 2022
7	7	"The Eye"	Charlotte Brändström	Jason Cahill	October 7, 2022
8	8	"Alloyed"	Wayne Che Yip	Gennifer Hutchison and J. D. Payne & Patrick McKay	October 14, 2022

=== Season 2 (2024) ===
No. overall	No. in season	Title	Directed by	Written by	Original release date
9	1	"Elven Kings Under the Sky"	Charlotte Brändström	Gennifer Hutchison	August 29, 2024
10	2	"Where the Stars are Strange"	Charlotte Brändström; Louise Hooper	Jason Cahill	August 29, 2024
11	3	"The Eagle and the Sceptre"	Louise Hooper; Charlotte Brändström	Helen Shang	August 29, 2024
12	4	"Eldest"	Louise Hooper; Sanaa Hamri	Glenise Mullins	September 5, 2024
13	5	"Halls of Stone"	Louise Hooper; Sanaa Hamri	Nicholas Adams	September 12, 2024
14	6	"Where Is He?"	Sanaa Hamri	Justin Doble	September 19, 2024
15	7	"Doomed to Die"	Charlotte Brändström	J. D. Payne & Patrick McKay and Justin Doble	September 26, 2024
16	8	"Shadow and Flame"	Charlotte Brändström	J. D. Payne & Patrick McKay	October 3, 2024

=== Season 3 (2026) ===
No. overall	No. in season	Title	Directed by	Written by	Original release date
17	1	"Marnûkh"	Charlotte Brändström	J. D. Payne & Patrick McKay	November 11, 2026
18	2	"The Gift of Men"	Charlotte Brändström	Justin Doble	November 11, 2026
19	3	"The Secret Fire"	Sanaa Hamri	J. D. Payne & Patrick McKay	November 11, 2026
20	4	"Gundabad"	Sanaa Hamri	Justin Doble	November 11, 2026
21	5	"The Lady of Lórien"	Sanaa Hamri	J. D. Payne & Patrick McKay	November 18, 2026
22	6	"From Valinor"	Stefan Schwartz	Justin Doble	November 18, 2026
23	7	TBA	Stefan Schwartz	J. D. Payne & Patrick McKay & Justin Doble	November 24, 2026
24	8	TBA	Charlotte Brändström	J. D. Payne & Patrick McKay	November 24, 2026

== Cast and characters ==
- Morfydd Clark as Galadriel: An Elven warrior who believes evil is returning to Middle-earth
- Lenny Henry as Sadoc Burrows: The leader of the Harfoots
- Sara Zwangobani as Marigold Brandyfoot: A Harfoot and Nori's stepmother
- Dylan Smith as Largo Brandyfoot: A Harfoot and Nori's father
- Markella Kavenagh as Elanor "Nori" Brandyfoot: A Harfoot with a "yearning for adventure"
- Megan Richards as Poppy Proudfellow: An orphaned Harfoot and Nori's best friend
- Robert Aramayo as Elrond: A half-Elven politician
- Benjamin Walker as Gil-galad: The High King of the Elves who rules from the realm of Lindon
- Ismael Cruz Córdova as Arondir: A Wood Elf with a forbidden love for the human healer Bronwyn
- Nazanin Boniadi as Bronwyn: A human healer and single mother who is in love with Arondir
- Tyroe Muhafidin as Theo: Bronwyn's son
- Charles Edwards as Celebrimbor: The Elven-smith who forges the Rings of Power
- Daniel Weyman as Gandalf: Initially known as "The Stranger", he is one of the Istari (Wizards)
- Owain Arthur as Durin IV: The prince of the Dwarven realm of Khazad-dûm
- Charlie Vickers as Sauron: The new Dark Lord who deceives the people of Middle-earth
- Sophia Nomvete as Disa: Durin IV's wife and the princess of Khazad-dûm
- Lloyd Owen as Elendil: A sailor from Númenor who will eventually be a leader in the last alliance
- Cynthia Addai-Robinson as Míriel: The queen regent of Númenor
- Trystan Gravelle as Pharazôn: A Númenórean advisor to queen regent Míriel
- Maxim Baldry as Isildur: Elendil's elder son who will eventually become a warrior and king
- Ema Horvath as Eärien: Elendil's daughter
- Leon Wadham as Kemen: Pharazôn's son
- Ciarán Hinds as the Dark Wizard: An Istar formerly known as Pallando who has been corrupted
- Peter Mullan as Durin III: The king of Khazad-dûm
- Jamie Campbell Bower as Celeborn: Galadriel's husband whom she believes to be dead
- Andrew Richardson as Anárion: Elendil's younger son
- Rory Kinnear as Tom Bombadil: A mysterious being that guides Gandalf
The Lord of the Rings: The Rings of Power cast members
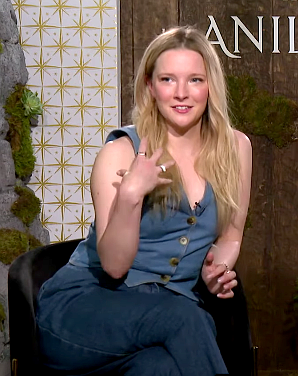
Morfydd Clark

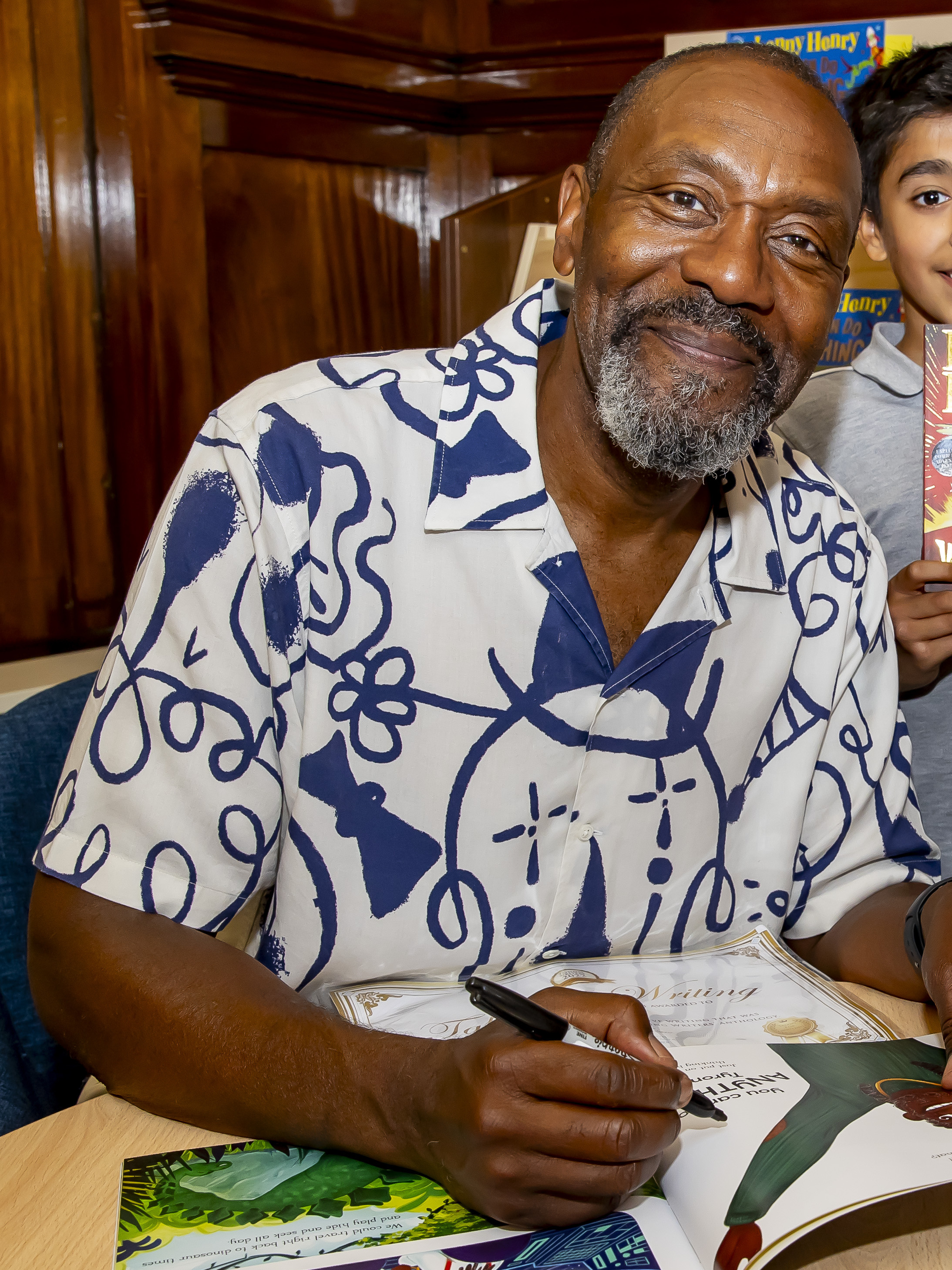
Lenny Henry

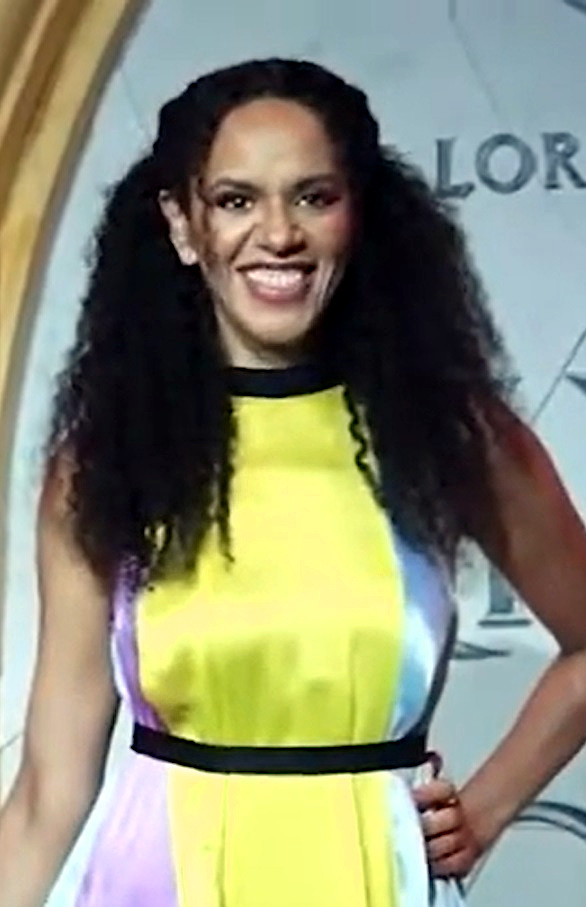
Sara Zwangobani

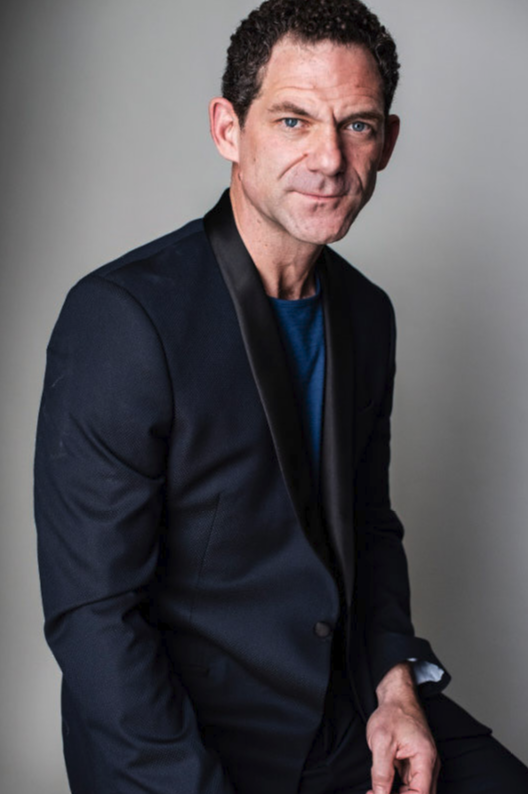
Dylan Smith

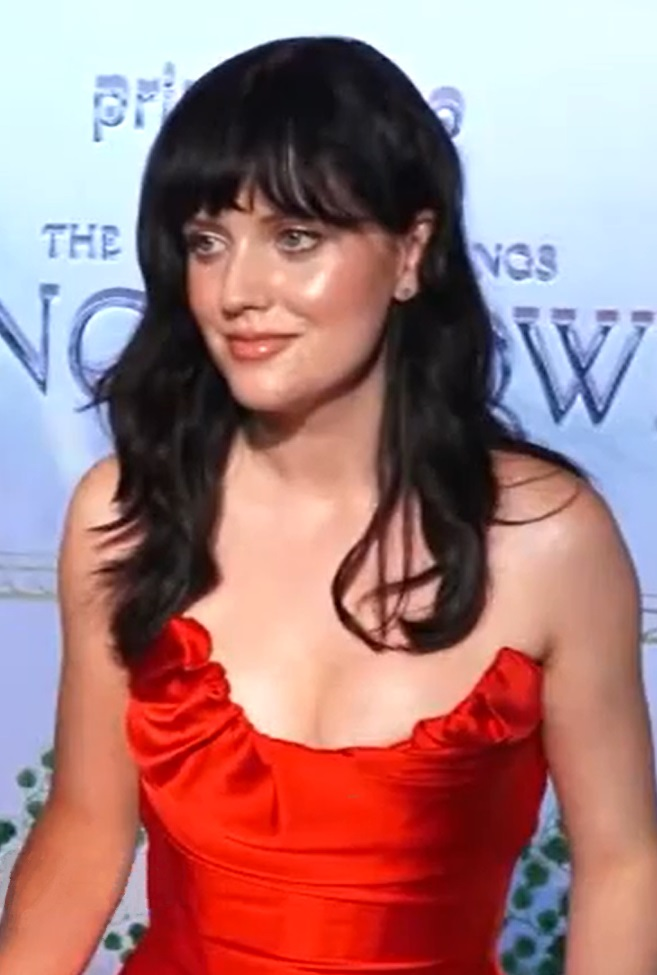
Markella Kavenagh

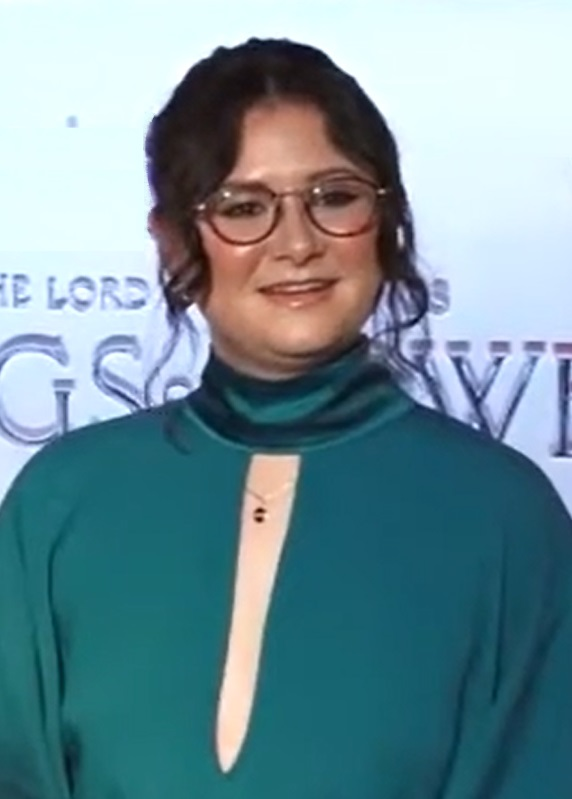
Megan Richards

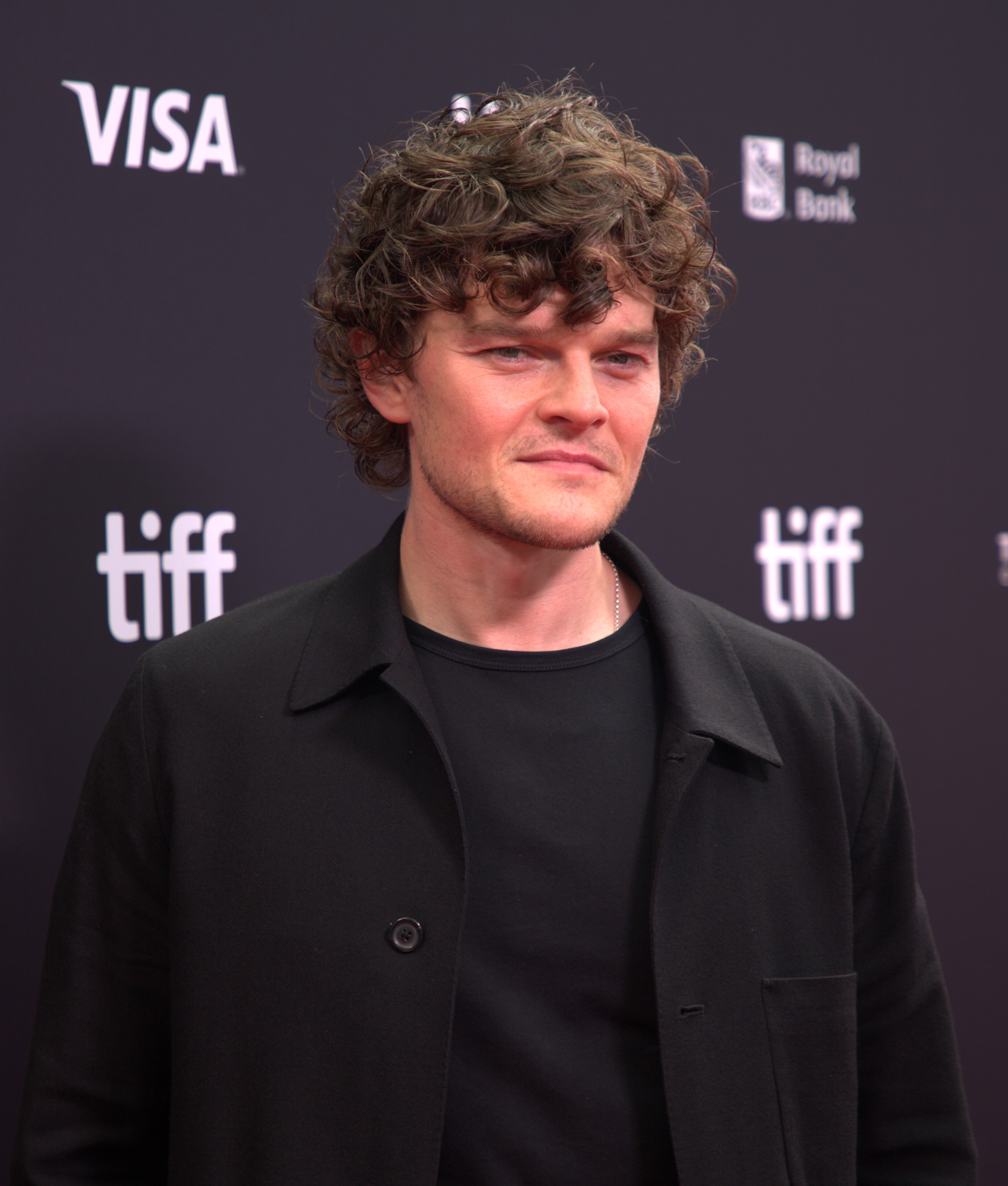
Robert Aramayo

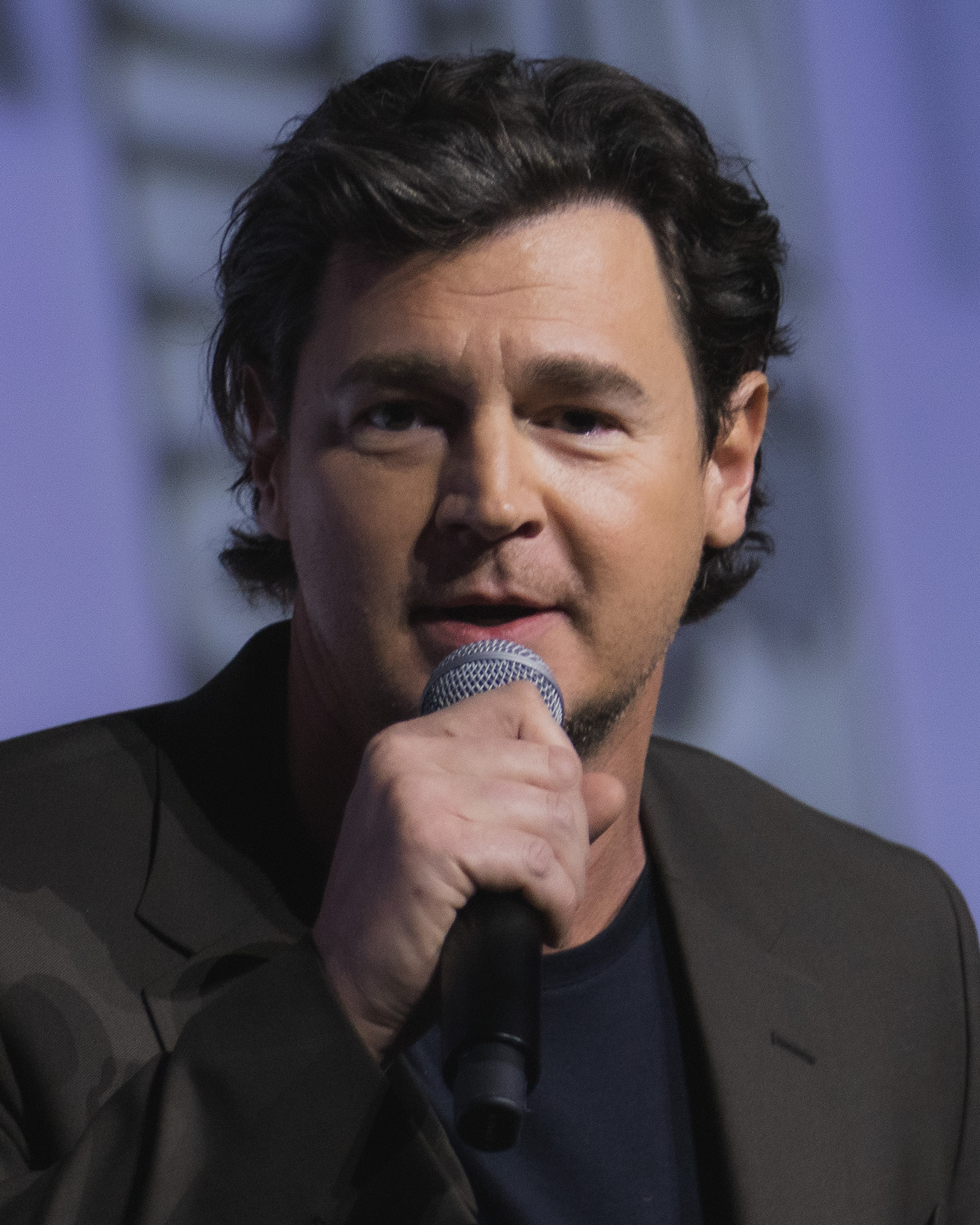
Benjamin Walker

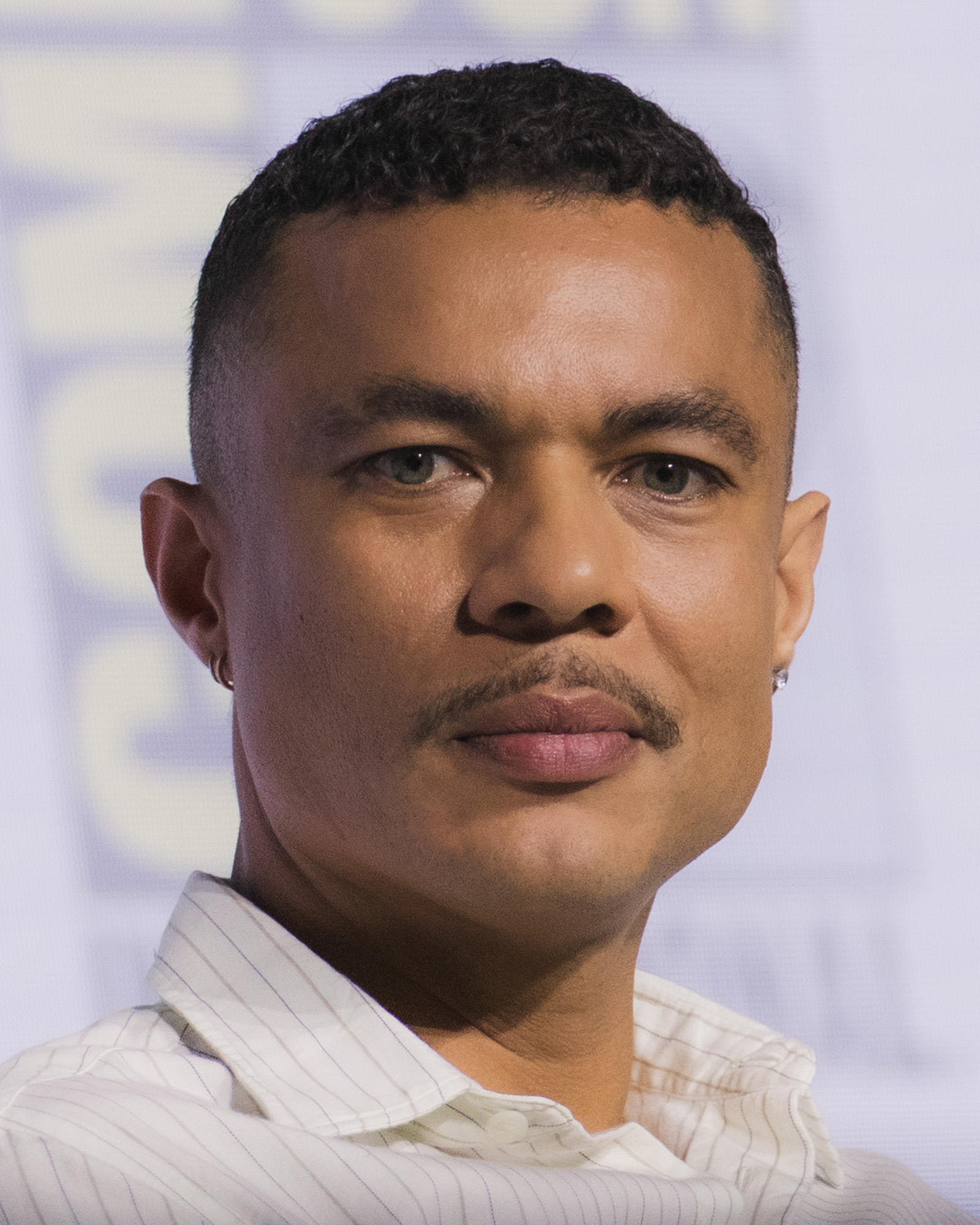
Ismael Cruz Córdova

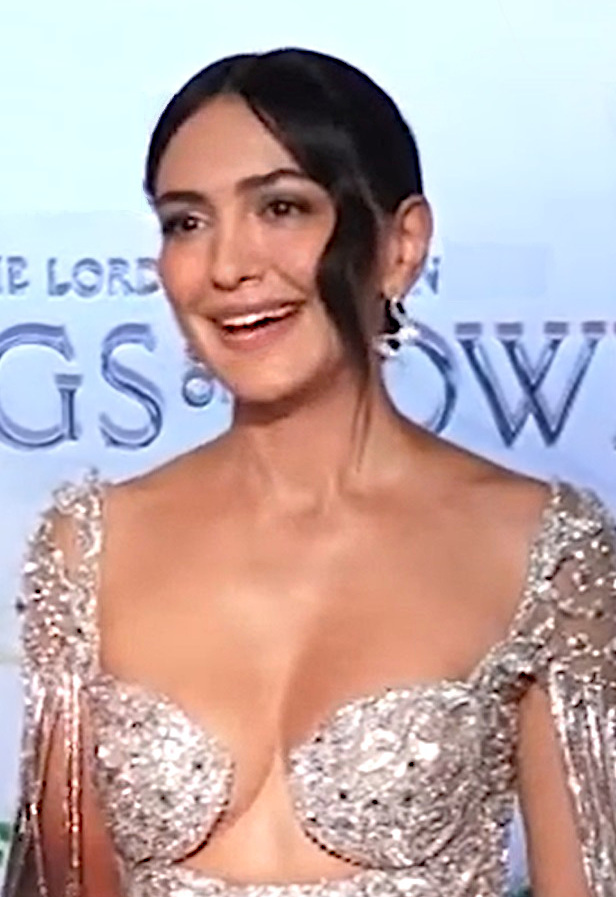
Nazanin Boniadi

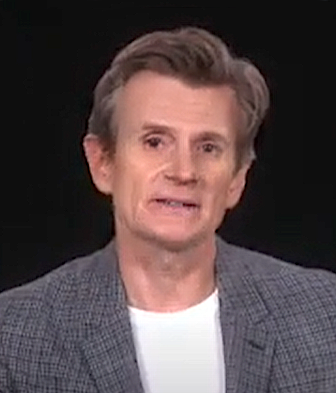
Charles Edwards

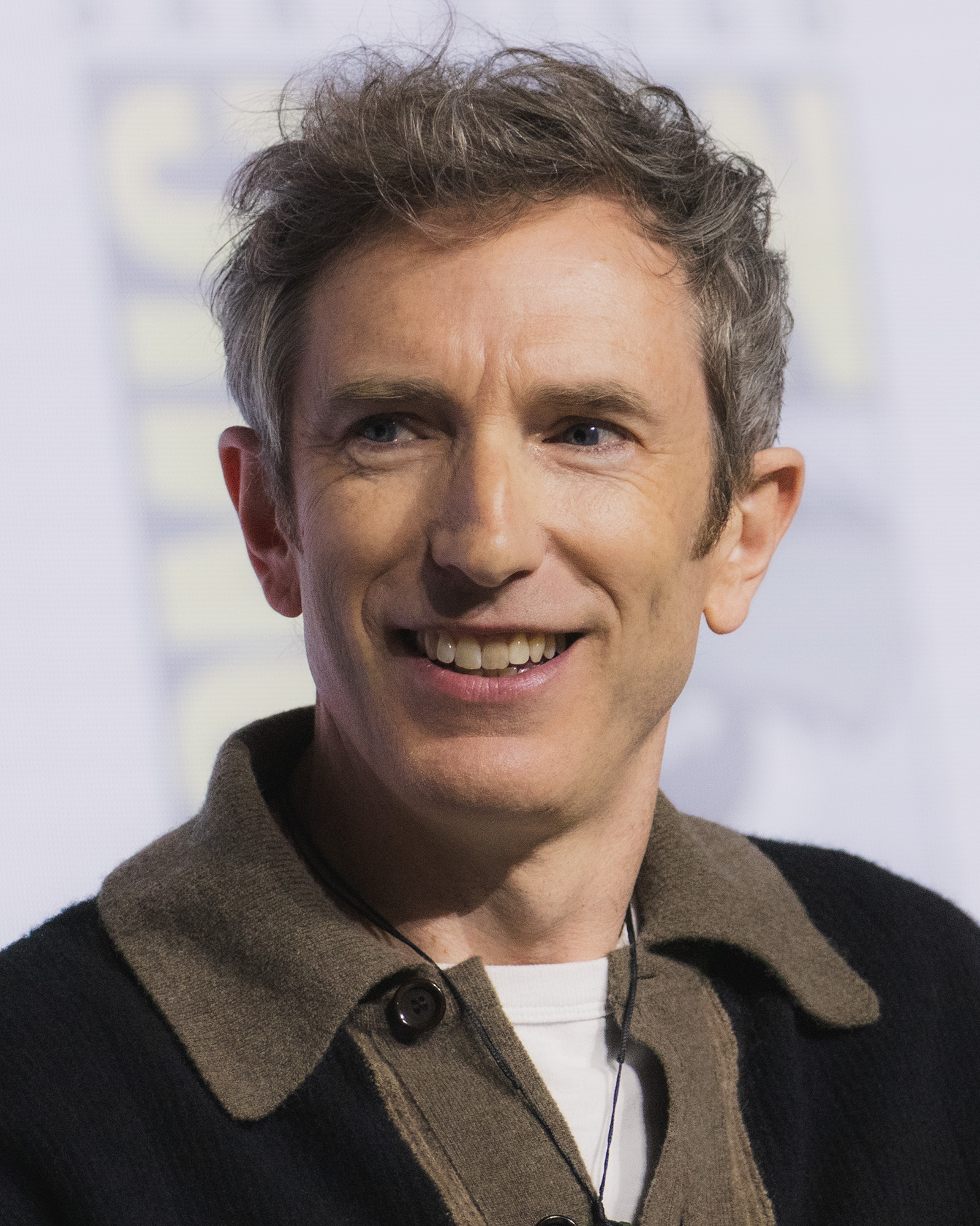
Daniel Weyman

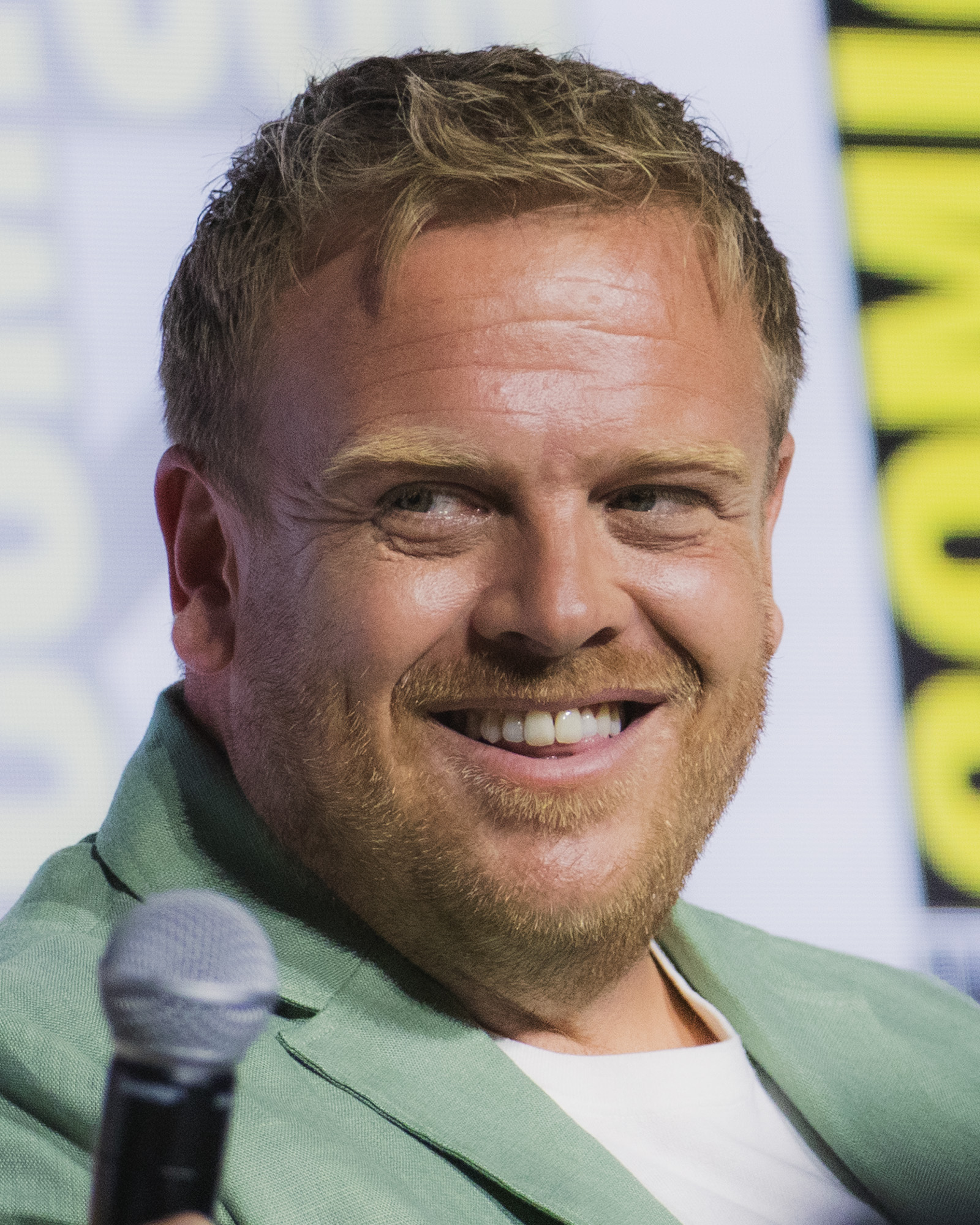
Owain Arthur

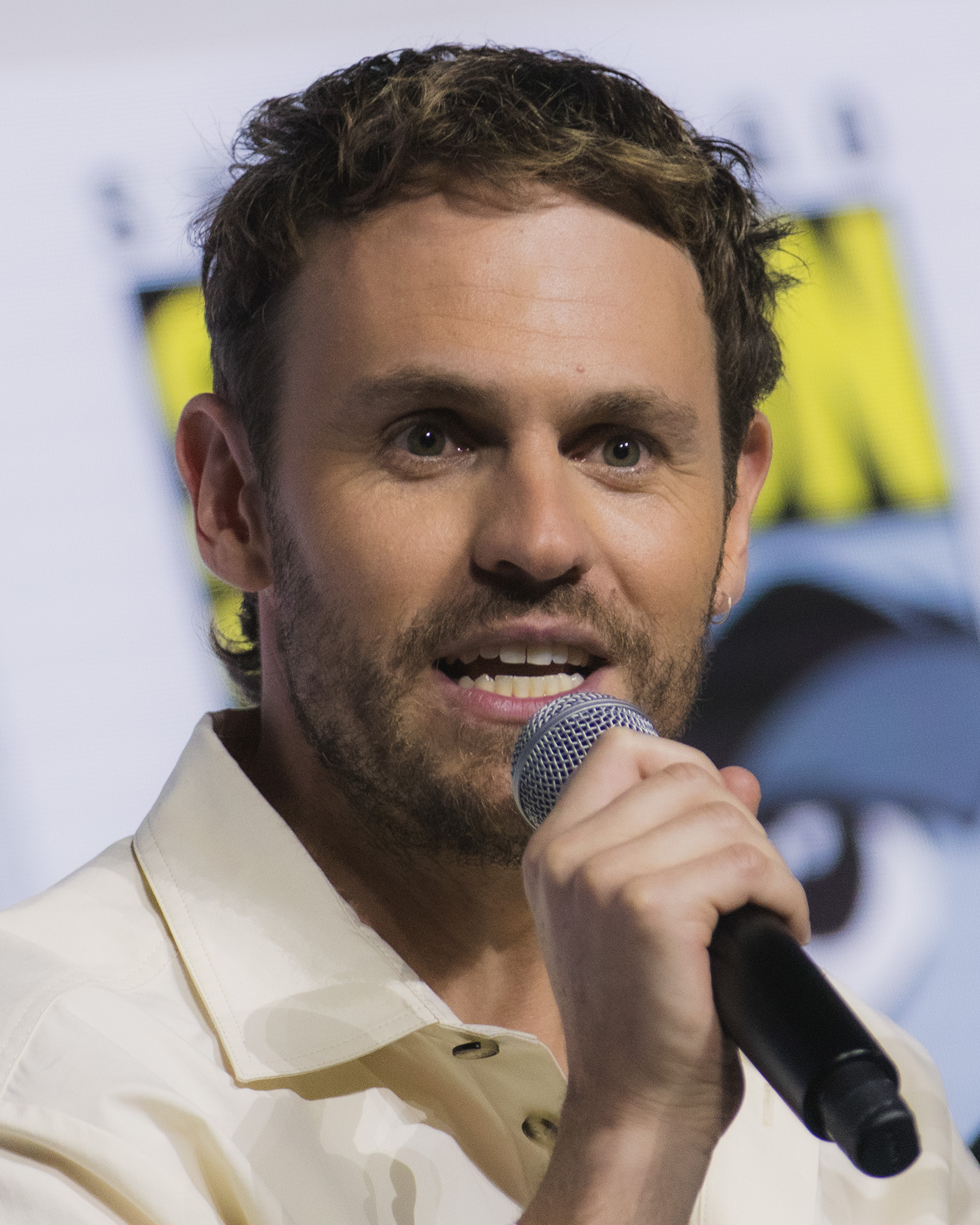
Charlie Vickers

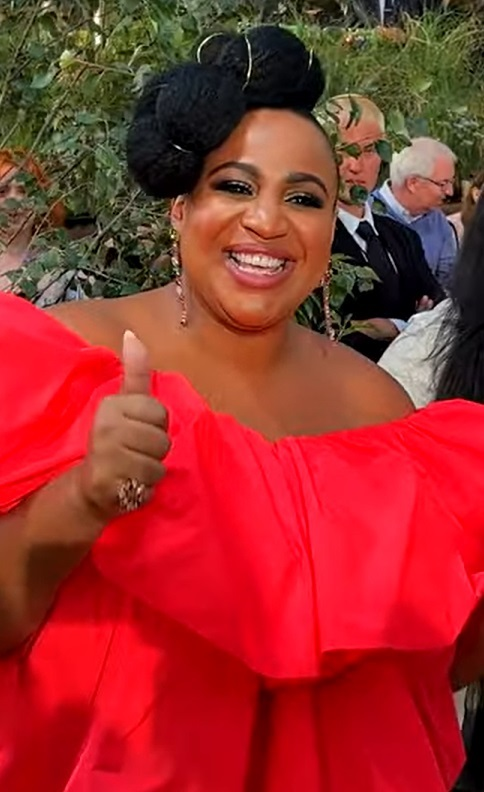
Sophia Nomvete

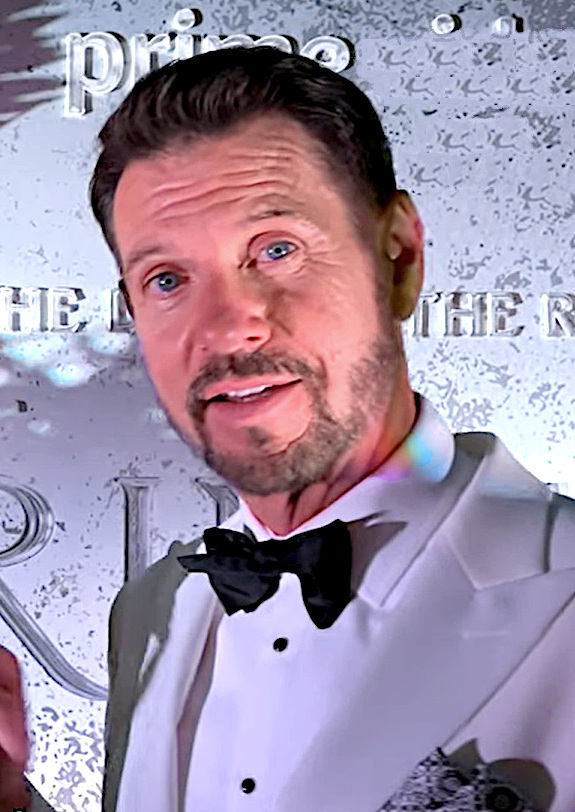
Lloyd Owen

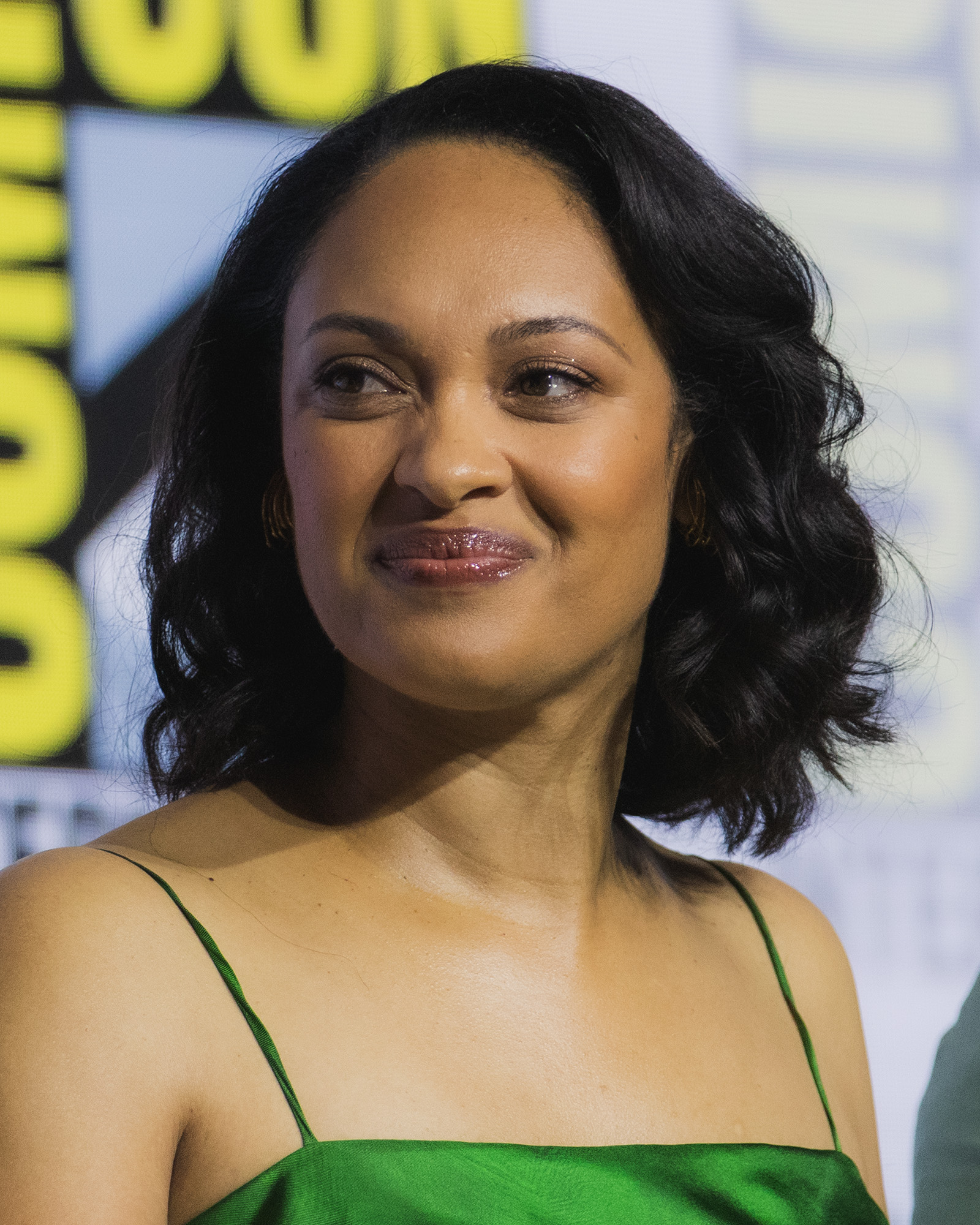
Cynthia Addai-Robinson

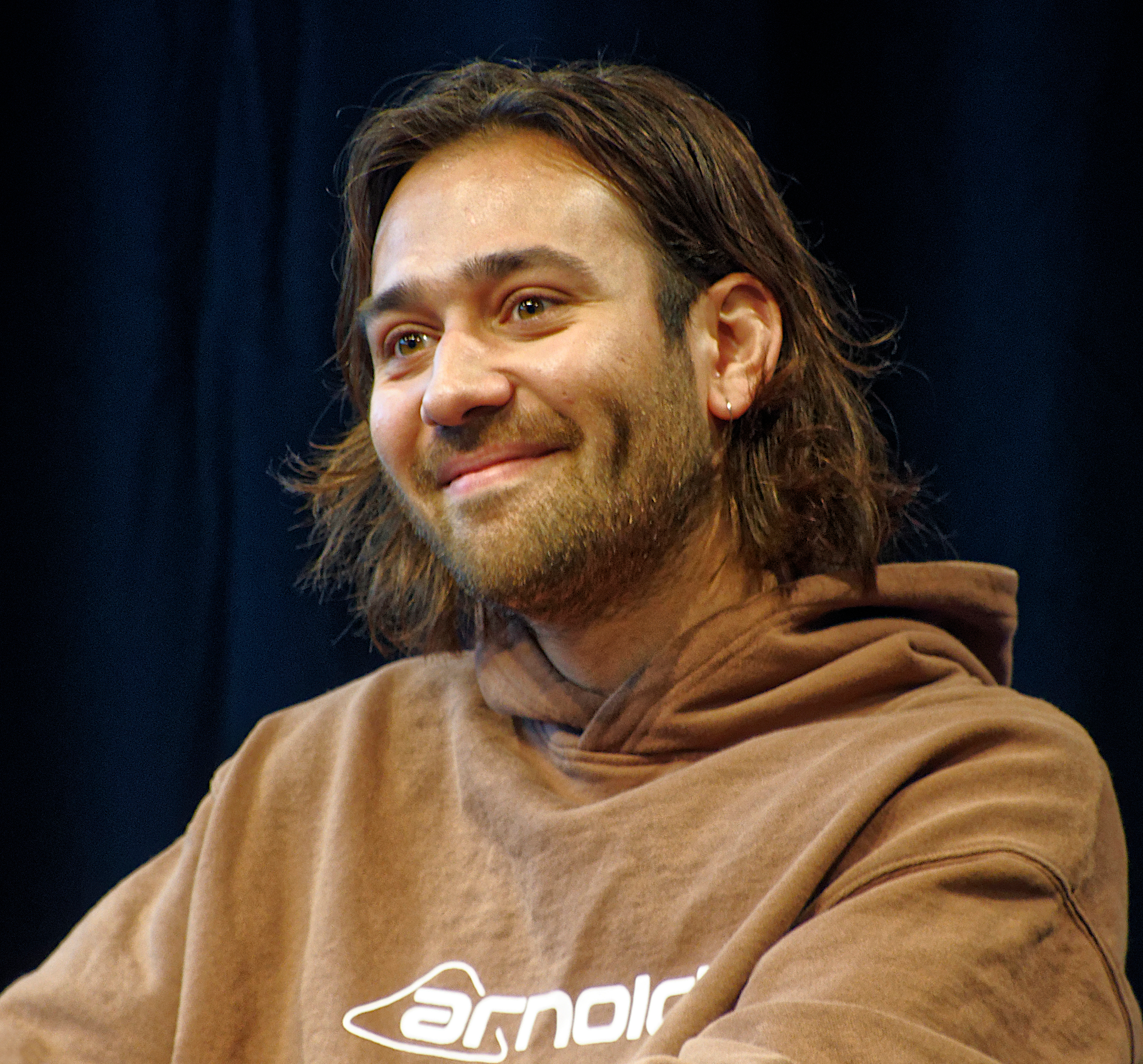
Maxim Baldry

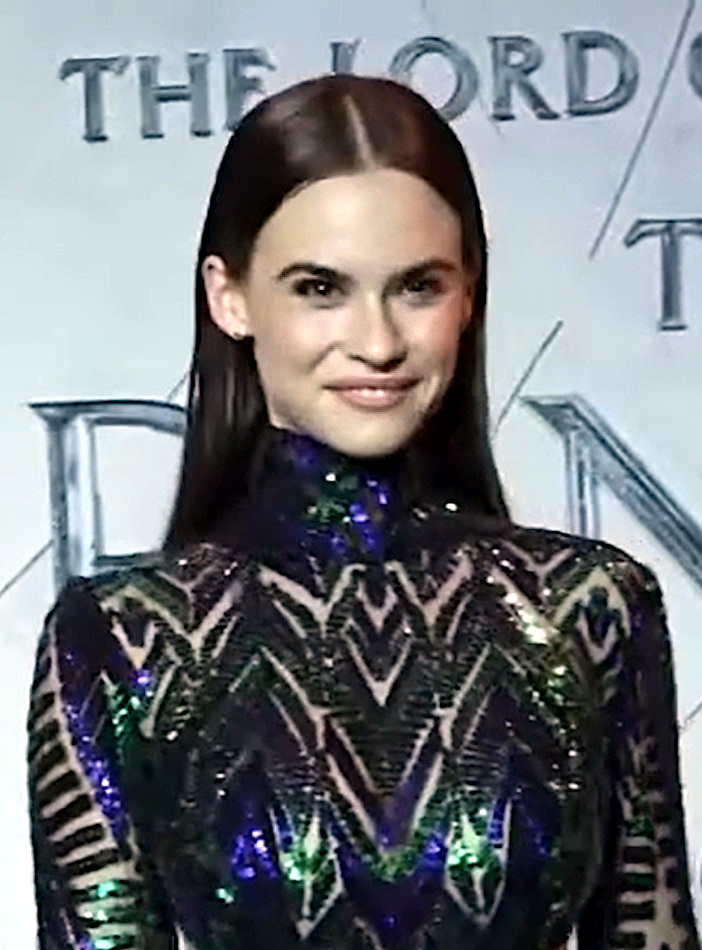
Ema Horvath

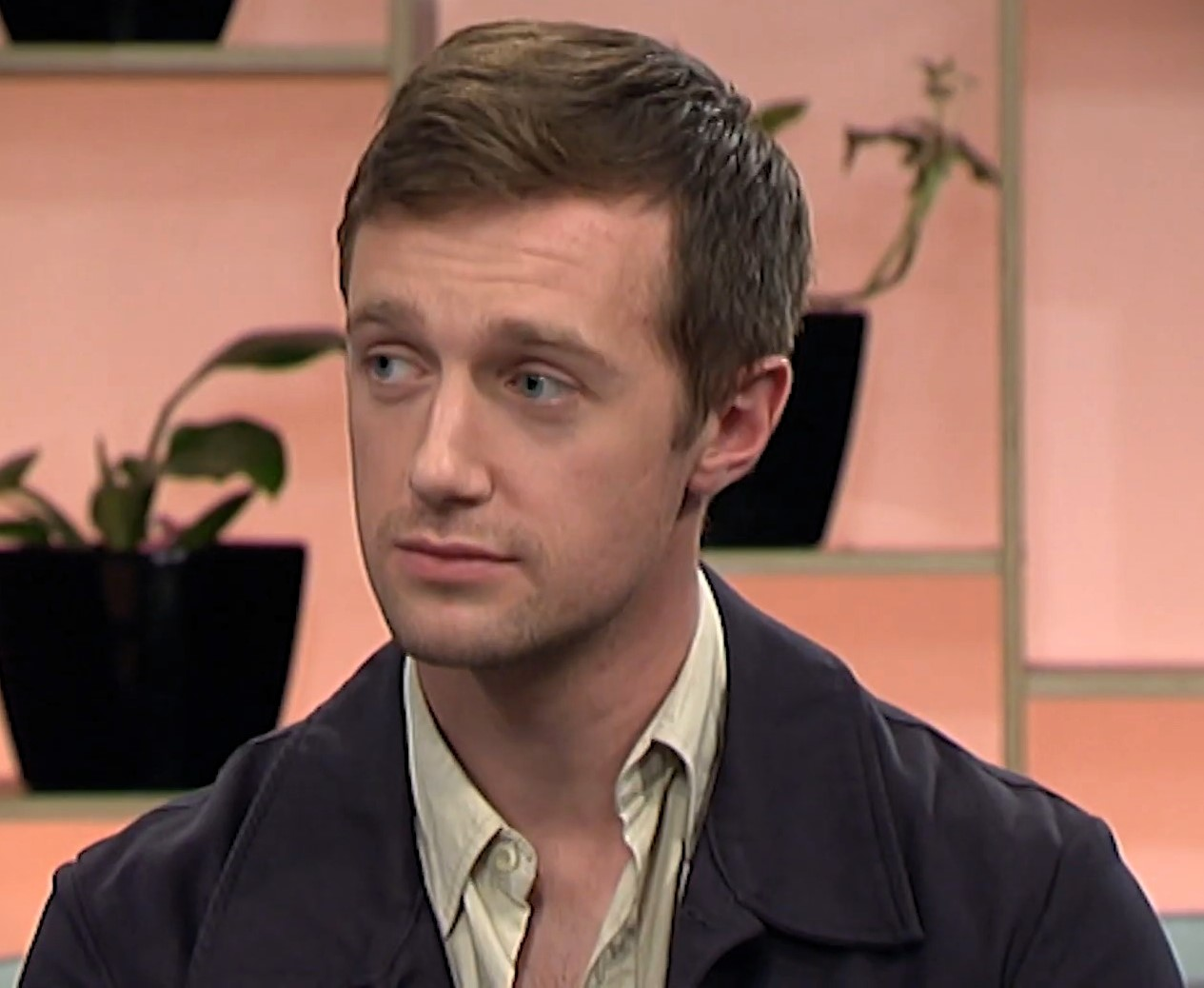
Leon Wadham

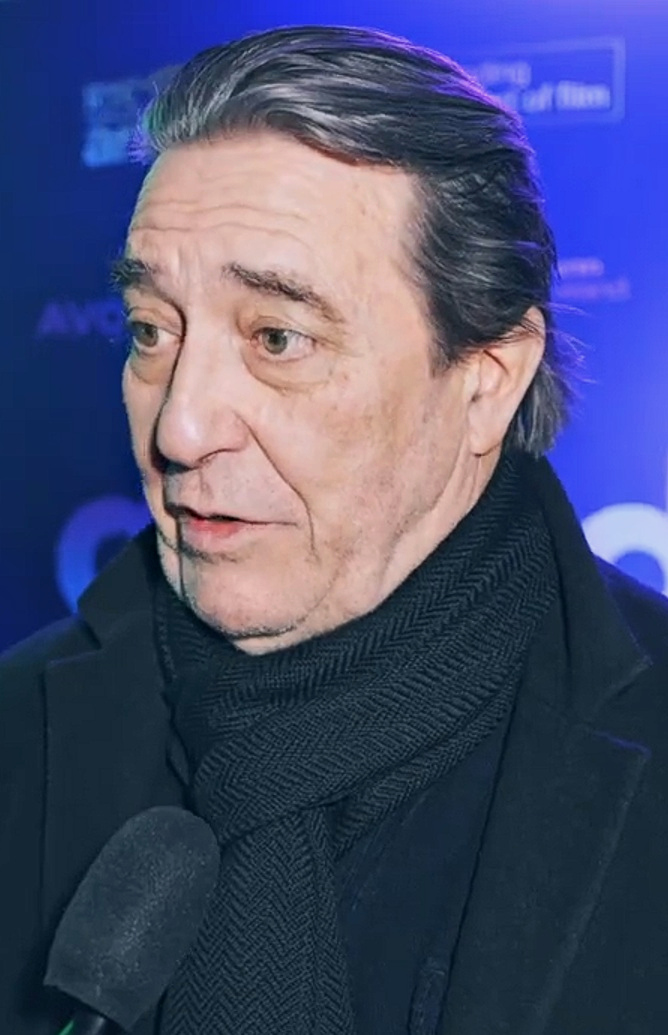
Ciarán Hinds

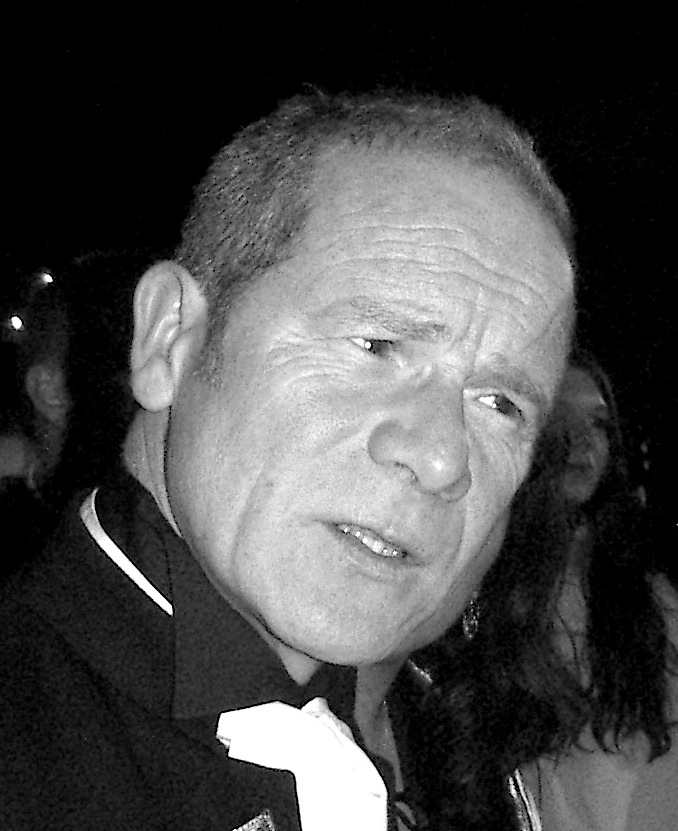
Peter Mullan

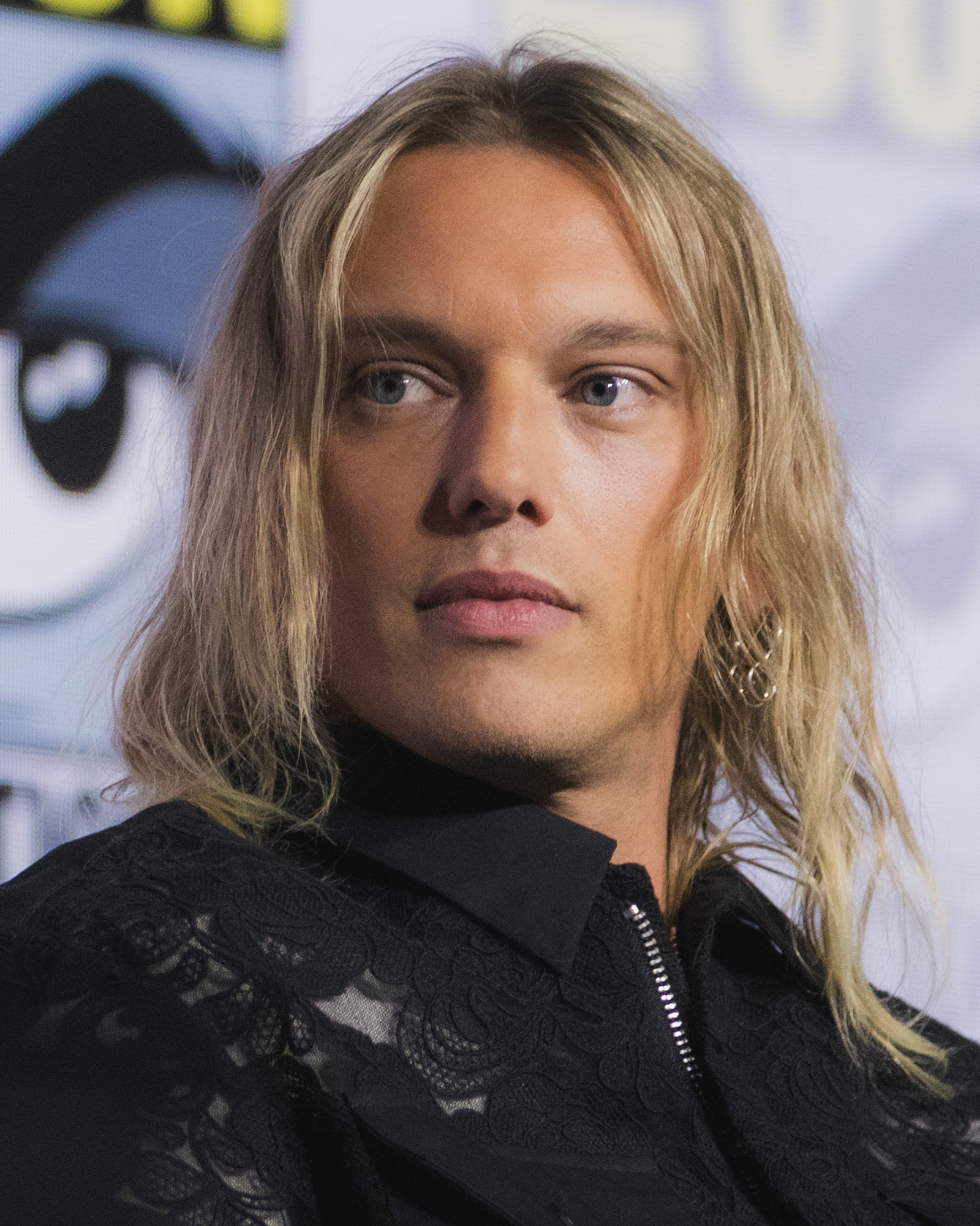
Jamie Campbell Bower

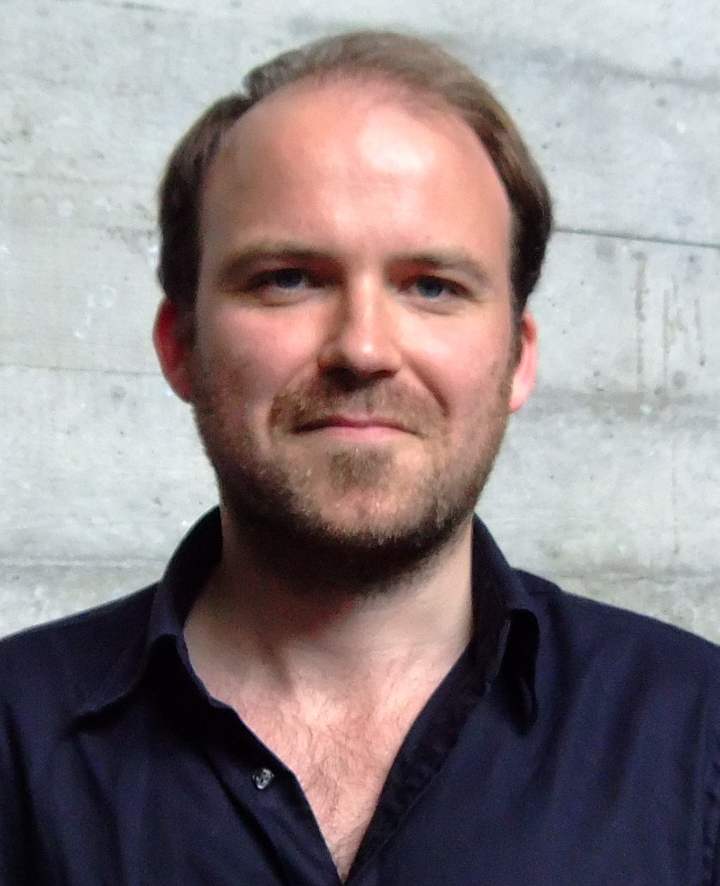
Rory Kinnear

== Production ==
=== Development ===
==== Initial announcements ====
In July 2017, a lawsuit was settled between Warner Bros., the studio behind Peter Jackson's The Lord of the Rings (2001–2003) and The Hobbit (2012–2014) film trilogies, and the estate of author J. R. R. Tolkien upon whose books those films were based. With the two sides "on better terms", they began offering the rights to a potential television series based on Tolkien's The Lord of the Rings (1954–55) to several outlets, including Amazon, Netflix, and HBO, with a starting price of US$200 million. HBO pitched a remake of the Lord of the Rings films which the estate was not interested in. Netflix pitched multiple connected series focusing on characters such as Aragorn and Gandalf which "completely freaked out the estate". Amazon did not pitch a specific story but promised to work closely with the estate to "protect Tolkien's legacy", which the estate felt they were unable to do with previous adaptations. Amazon emerged as the frontrunner by September 2017 and entered negotiations. Uncommonly for programming developments, Amazon CEO Jeff Bezos was personally involved with the negotiations. A noted fan of The Lord of the Rings, Bezos previously gave Amazon Studios a mandate to develop an ambitious fantasy series of comparable scale to HBO's Game of Thrones (2011–2019).

On November 13, 2017, Amazon acquired the global television rights for close to US$250 million. Industry commentators described this amount, before any production costs and without any creative talent attached, as "insane", although some considered the project to be more of a reputational risk for Amazon than a financial one due to Bezos's wealth. Amazon's streaming service Amazon Prime Video gave a multi-season commitment to the series that was believed to be for five seasons, with the possibility of a spin-off series. Despite this, Prime Video had to give a formal greenlight to future seasons before work could begin on them. The budget was expected to be in the range of US$100–150 million per season, and was likely to eventually exceed US$1 billion which would make it the most expensive television series ever made. Warner Bros. Television was not involved in the project because Amazon Studios wanted to produce it themselves. Amazon was working with the Tolkien Estate, the Tolkien Trust, HarperCollins, and New Line Cinema. New Line, the Warner Bros. division that produced the films, was reportedly included to allow the use of material from the films in the series. The estate imposed creative restrictions, and the deal stipulated that production begin within two years.

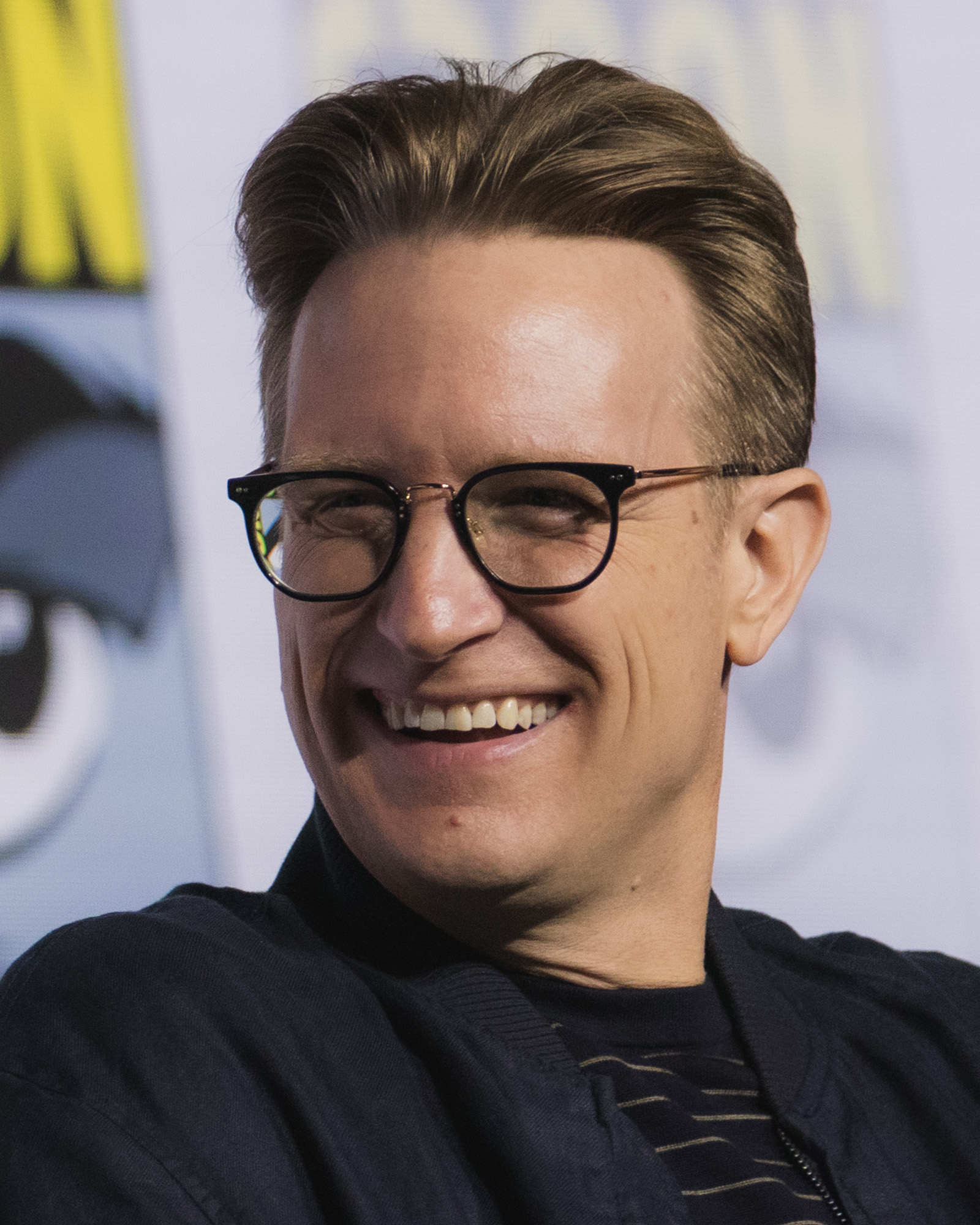
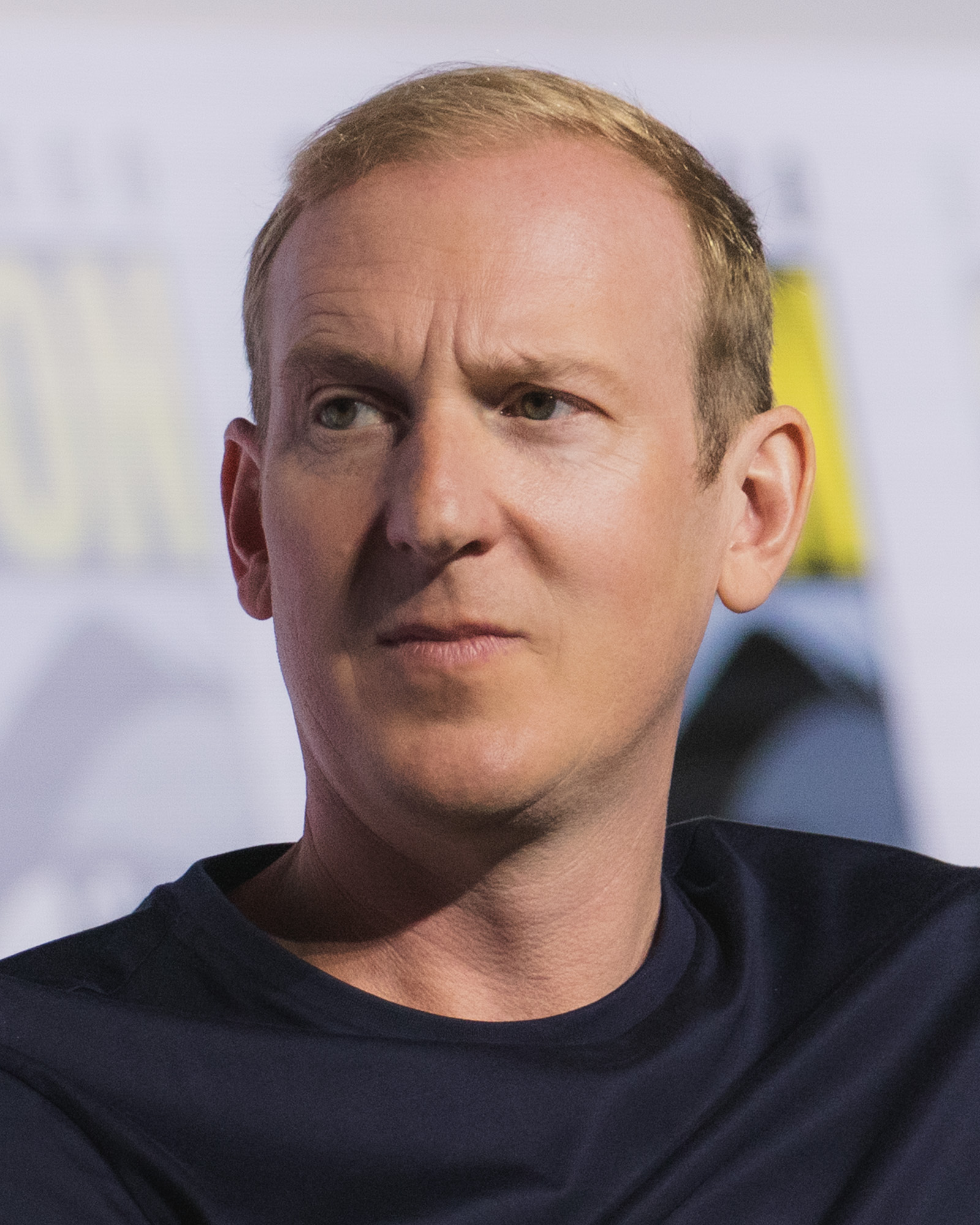
Showrunners J. D. Payne and Patrick McKay had only done unproduced or uncredited writing work before they were hired to develop the series.

The first season was reported in May 2018 to be focusing on a young Aragorn. Jennifer Salke, the head of Amazon Studios at the time, said a month later that the deal for the series had only just been officially completed. The studio met more than 30 potential writers, including the Russo brothers and Anthony McCarten, and asked for story pitches based on anything in Tolkien's The Hobbit (1937), The Lord of the Rings, and its appendices. These included prequel stories focused on characters such as Aragorn, Gimli, and Gandalf. J. D. Payne and Patrick McKay pitched a series covering the major events of Middle-earth's Second Age, thousands of years before The Lord of the Rings, including the forging of the Rings of Power, the rise of the Dark Lord Sauron, the fall of the island kingdom of Númenor, and the last alliance between Elves and Men. These events are covered in a five-minute prologue in the Lord of the Rings films, and the pair wanted to expand this into "50 hours of television".

Unlike the other writers being interviewed, Payne and McKay had only done unproduced or uncredited work. They were championed by director J. J. Abrams, who worked with them on an unproduced Star Trek film, and were hired to develop the series in July 2018. Payne described the Second Age as "an amazing, untold story", and McKay said, "We didn't want to do a side thing. A spin-off or the origin story of something else. We wanted to find a huge Tolkienian mega epic". The pair were confirmed as showrunners and executive producers in July 2019, when the full creative team was revealed. Additional executive producers included Lindsey Weber, Callum Greene, J. A. Bayona, Belén Atienza, Justin Doble, Jason Cahill, Gennifer Hutchison, Bruce Richmond, and Sharon Tal Yguado. Prime Video announced the full title, The Lord of the Rings: The Rings of Power, in January 2022. Payne and McKay felt this title could "live on the spine of a book next to J. R. R. Tolkien's other classics". They initially considered using a different subtitle for each season.

==== Subsequent seasons ====
Prime Video officially ordered a second season in November 2019, ahead of filming for the first season. Jackson initially said he and his producing partners would read scripts for the series and offer notes, but after the first season was produced he said this did not happen. Amazon explained that the deal with Tolkien's estate required the series to be kept distinct from Jackson's films. The estate were also reportedly against Jackson being involved. Amazon spent US$465 million producing the first season in New Zealand, where the films were made, before moving production on subsequent seasons to the United Kingdom.

A third season had not been ordered by the second season's premiere in August 2024, leading to speculation about the series' future amid concerns about its quality and viewership. When the showrunners were asked if they had any contingency plans should Amazon decide to end the series before their five-season plan was complete, McKay stated: "We're not anticipating that. We're making our show and going all the way." Amazon was soon reported to be committed to the five-season plan, and the third season was officially confirmed by Prime Video in February 2025. Charlotte Brändström, a director on all three seasons, and Kate Hazell were made executive producers for the season. In October, following the departures of Salke and television co-head Vernon Sanders from the renamed Amazon MGM Studios, Lesley Goldberg at The Ankler discussed industry questions about whether the series should be cancelled by Amazon. She reported that production costs for the second and third seasons had been "dramatically reduced" due to the UK's tax incentives, that viewer retention was improved with the second season, and that Amazon would have to pay a US$20 million "kill fee" to the Tolkien estate for each season that was not produced out of the five season plan. Goldberg further reported in April 2026 that the series was being protected by Bezos, regardless of cost, and Amazon's new television head Peter Friedlander was committed to the original plan. However, Amazon no longer planned to develop a spin-off series.

Development on a fourth season was revealed in May 2026, with a production schedule planned, although the season had not been officially greenlit by then. In July, Payne confirmed that the fourth season was "already on its way". McKay indicated that it was being written simultaneously with post-production on the third season.

=== Writing ===
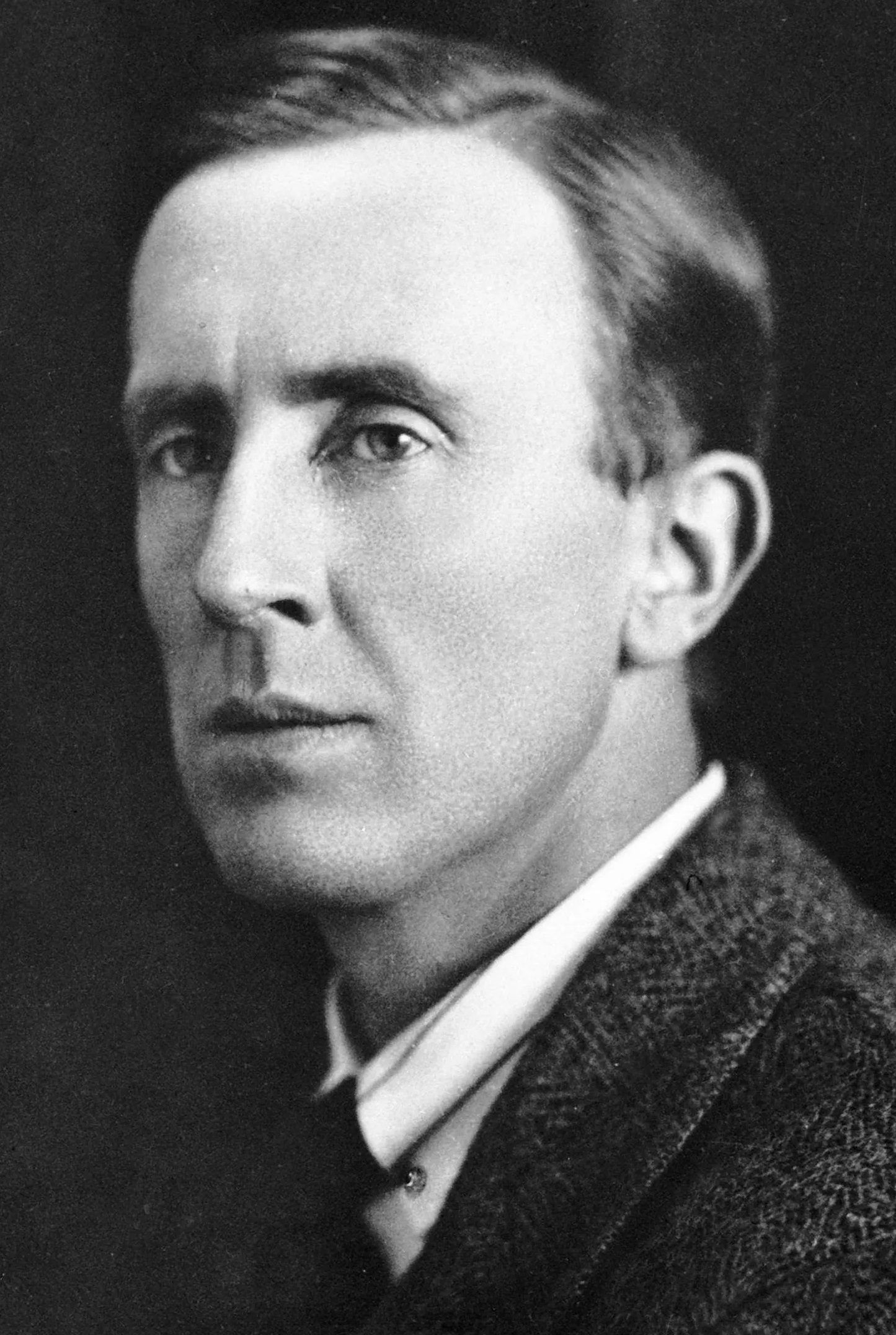
The Rings of Power is based on the writings of J. R. R. Tolkien, primarily material from the appendices of the novel The Lord of the Rings pertaining to the Second Age of Middle-earth. Amazon did not acquire the rights to other novels which cover the Second Age, such as The Silmarillion.

The Lord of the Rings and The Hobbit are set during the Third Age of Middle-earth, while the First and Second Ages are primarily explored in The Silmarillion (1977), Unfinished Tales (1980), and The History of Middle-earth (1983–1996). Because Amazon only acquired the television rights to The Lord of the Rings and The Hobbit, the writers had to identify all of the references to the Second Age in those books and create a story that bridged those passages. These are mostly in the appendices of The Lord of the Rings. The estate was prepared to veto any changes from Tolkien's narrative, including anything that contradicted what he wrote in other works. The writers were free to add characters and details, and worked with the estate and Tolkien scholars to ensure these were "Tolkienian". They referenced letters that Tolkien wrote about his mythology for additional context on the setting and characters. Simon Tolkien, a novelist and the grandson of J. R. R. Tolkien, helped develop the story and character arcs. He is credited as a "series consultant". Tolkien scholar Tom Shippey worked on the series early on, but left after revealing details without permission. Griff Jones was hired as a Tolkien "loremaster", approaching The Lord of the Rings and its appendices like a historical advisor would treat real history.

Payne and McKay knew the series was expected to run for five seasons and were able to plan elements of the final season, including the final shot, while working on the first. The Second Age takes place over thousands of years in Tolkien's history; the writers were concerned that human characters would be frequently dying due to their relatively short lifespans, and that key humans from the end of the Second Age would not be introduced until late in the series. They considered using non-linear storytelling to solve this issue, but felt that would prevent the audience from emotionally investing in the series. Instead, they compressed the timeline so all the major events of the Second Age take place within a short period of time. The Tolkien estate approved this change, as long as the major events still took place in the same order as in Tolkien's history, and the showrunners felt they were still respecting the "spirit and feeling" of Tolkien's writings despite this change. They structured the series so each season would be built around several "major tentpole moments" from the Second Age.

Because they were unable to adapt dialogue from Tolkien's Second Age stories, the writers attempted to repurpose dialogue that they did have access to. Leith McPherson returned from the Hobbit films as dialect coach and guided the use of Tolkien's fictional languages in the series. She established different dialects for each culture of Middle-earth. Carl F. Hostetter, a Tolkien scholar and the head of the Elvish Linguistic Fellowship, also consulted on the use of Tolkien's languages and provided translations. After the crew for the first season was revealed to include Jennifer Ward-Lealand as an intimacy coordinator, Tolkien fans expressed concern that it would include Game of Thrones-style graphic sex and violence. Payne and McKay said this would not be the case and the series would be family-friendly. They hoped to evoke the tone of Tolkien's books, which can be "intense, sometimes quite political, sometimes quite sophisticated—but it's also heartwarming and life-affirming and optimistic." They felt it was important to embrace the hope and earnestness in Tolkien's works, and said they did not want to be influenced by contemporary politics, aspiring to tell a timeless story that matched Tolkien's own intention to create a mythology that would always be applicable.

The showrunners disagreed with suggestions that the series is only "vaguely connected" to Tolkien's writings. McKay said in August 2022 that they felt it was "deeply, deeply connected" and a "story we're stewarding that was here before us and was waiting in those books" to be told. He elaborated on their position in August 2024, explaining that they wanted to honor the tone, themes, and spirit of the source material but their priority was to make an entertaining television series that worked for casual viewers as well as Tolkien fans. He said they chose to tell a story in the Second Age because Tolkien "never wrote a fixed version" of the time period and they felt they could create an "epic version of this story". A disclaimer is featured in the end credits stating that some elements are "inspired by, though not contained in, the original source material".

=== Casting ===
Salke stated in June 2018 that the series would include some characters from the films, and the showrunners intended for the new actors to look like they could feasibly grow up to be their film counterparts. In January 2020, Amazon announced that the series' main cast would include Robert Aramayo, Owain Arthur, Nazanin Boniadi, Tom Budge, Morfydd Clark, Ismael Cruz Córdova, Ema Horvath, Markella Kavenagh, Joseph Mawle, Tyroe Muhafidin, Sophia Nomvete, Megan Richards, Dylan Smith, Charlie Vickers, and Daniel Weyman. Aramayo and Clark were cast as younger versions of the film characters Elrond and Galadriel, respectively. Sanders noted that there were still some key roles that had yet to be filled. In December, Amazon announced 20 new cast members: Cynthia Addai-Robinson, Maxim Baldry, Ian Blackburn, Kip Chapman, Anthony Crum, Maxine Cunliffe, Trystan Gravelle, Lenny Henry, Thusitha Jayasundera, Fabian McCallum, Simon Merrells, Geoff Morrell, Peter Mullan, Lloyd Owen, Augustus Prew, Peter Tait, Alex Tarrant, Leon Wadham, Benjamin Walker, and Sara Zwangobani. Baldry, Owen, and Walker portray Isildur, Elendil, and Gil-galad, respectively, characters that appear in the films during flashbacks. Budge revealed in March 2021 that Amazon had decided to recast his character after filming several episodes. Charles Edwards was cast to replace him that July. Will Fletcher, Amelie Child-Villiers, and Beau Cassidy were also added to the cast then.

Boniadi chose not to return for the second season and her character Bronwyn was not recast. In early December 2022, Sam Hazeldine was revealed to have replaced Joseph Mawle in the role of Adar for the second season. Amazon also announced the casting of Gabriel Akuwudike, Yasen "Zates" Atour, Ben Daniels, Amelia Kenworthy, Nia Towle, and Nicholas Woodeson. Daniels portrays Círdan, a character who briefly appears in the films. A week later, Amazon further announced the casting of Oliver Alvin-Wilson, Stuart Bowman, Gavi Singh Chera, William Chubb, Kevin Eldon, Will Keen, Selina Lo, and Calam Lynch. Amazon announced the casting of Ciarán Hinds, Rory Kinnear, and Tanya Moodie in March 2023. The second season reveals that Weyman is portraying an earlier version of Gandalf. In February 2025, Amazon announced the casting of Jamie Campbell Bower and Eddie Marsan for the third season, with Bower cast as a younger version of film character Celeborn. In June, Amazon further announced the casting of Andrew Richardson, Zubin Varla, and Adam Young.

=== Design ===
Rick Heinrichs and Kate Hawley were initially announced as production designer and costume designer, respectively, but Heinrichs was soon replaced by Ramsey Avery. Hawley returned from the films, along with illustrator/concept artist John Howe, and special effects company Wētā Workshop. Although the series is distinct from Jackson's films, the showrunners intended for it to be visually consistent with them. One of the "guideposts" Avery was given when he joined the series was for each Middle-earth culture to be easily identifiable; a "war room" was assembled where the design language for each culture was defined. Avery and Hawley did not return for the second season, and were replaced by Kristian Milsted and Luca Mosca, respectively. Barrie and Sarah Gower's BGFX took over as the prosthetics house for the second season.

=== Filming ===
In June 2018, Salke said the series could be produced in New Zealand, where the film trilogies were made, but Amazon was also willing to shoot in other countries as long as they could "provide those locations in a really authentic way, because we want it to look incredible". Amazon confirmed in September 2019 that filming for the first season would take place in New Zealand. Scotland had also been considered as a location. Filming for the season began in Auckland in February 2020, with J. A. Bayona directing the first two episodes. Production was placed on hold in mid-March due to the COVID-19 pandemic, and this shutdown segued into an already planned production break that allowed footage from the first two episodes to be reviewed and writing on the second season to begin. Filming resumed at the end of September. Wayne Che Yip and Charlotte Brändström directed the rest of the season's episodes. Around a third of filming took place on location around New Zealand. Production for the first season officially wrapped on August 2, 2021.

The week after filming ended for the first season, Amazon announced that it was moving production of the series to the United Kingdom starting with the second season. Factors that played a role in the change included Amazon already heavily investing in UK studio space for other productions as well as New Zealand's restrictive pandemic-era border policies. Tolkien's estate also wanted the series to be filmed in the UK since Tolkien was inspired by locations there when writing his books. Pre-production for the second season was expected to begin in the UK in the second quarter of 2022, taking place concurrently with post-production for the first season which was continuing in New Zealand until June 2022. Filming on the second season began on October 3, with Brändström, Sanaa Hamri, and Louise Hooper directing. Filming took place primarily at Bray Film Studios and Bovingdon Airfield outside of London, with location filming around the UK and in the Canary Islands. Production for the season wrapped in June 2023, amid the 2023 Writers Guild of America strike.

Production on the third season moved to Shepperton Studios in Surrey, after Amazon signed a long-term deal for exclusive use of new facilities at Shepperton in 2022. Pre-production was underway there by February 2025. Filming was reported to be starting on April 30, and was confirmed to have begun in May, with Brändström, Hamri, and Stefan Schwartz directing. Filming was reported to have wrapped at the end of October, and the end of production for the season was officially confirmed in mid-December. Pre-production for the fourth season is planned to begin in late 2026, ahead of the third season's release, with filming set to begin in early 2027. Production is expected to remain at Shepperton for the season.

=== Visual effects ===
Amazon provided unlimited cloud-based storage for the production, allowing all technical data and footage to be accessible to anyone working on the series around the world. It was the first production to be completely cloud-based, which became crucial during the COVID-19 pandemic. The primary visual effects vendors for the first season were Wētā FX, returning from Jackson's films, and Industrial Light & Magic (ILM). All the vendors were overseen by visual effects supervisor Jason Smith. The season's effects include characters appearing at different sizes, augmented environments, fantasy creatures, and magic.

=== Title sequence ===
External videos
- Rings of Power Main Title Sequence presents the opening title sequence created by Plains of Yonder with composer Howard Shore's main title theme, YouTube video from Plains of Yonder's channel

The series' opening title sequence was directed by Katrina Crawford and Mark Bashore of the creative studio Plains of Yonder. They did not see any material from the series when starting work on the sequence and instead took inspiration from Tolkien's writings. Based on the author's creation story in which the world is created from music, the pair suggested the title sequence be "built from the world of sound". They investigated cymatics, using a homemade Chladni plate and slow motion footage to test what shapes could be formed from sand particles using the vibrations of different sounds. These included Gregorian chants, Angelic music, rock and roll, and whale calls.

For the final sequence, Crawford and Bashore used a 2 feet (0.61 m) wide rig and programmed tones to create basic cymatic patterns such as diamonds and swirls. These were filmed practically, and then the Plains of Yonder visual effects team attempted to replicate the "flawed, wild motion" of the real photography for shots that feature iconography from Tolkien's writings, including the Two Trees of Valinor; the eight-pointed star associated with the character Fëanor; different parts of Middle-earth's geography; and each set of the Rings of Power—nine rings for Men, seven for Dwarves, three for Elves, and the ruling One Ring. The sequence took seven months to complete. It was updated for the second season, introducing red sand grains that form "evil tendrils" to indicate Sauron's influence, as well as imagery that represents the Doors of Durin, the Balrog, and Morgoth's crown.

=== Music ===
Howard Shore, the composer for the Lord of the Rings and Hobbit films, was reported to be in discussions with Amazon about working on the series in September 2020. He was said to be interested in developing musical themes but not necessarily composing the entire score. Shore was confirmed to be in talks for the series a year later, when composer Bear McCreary was reported to be involved as well. Their hiring was officially announced in July 2022, with McCreary composing the score and Shore writing the main title theme. McCreary was contractually prohibited from quoting any themes that Shore wrote for the films. He said the series was a "once-in-a-lifetime opportunity" to work on such an ambitious score, and he hoped to create a "continuity of concept" between the series and Shore's work on the films. He wrote more than 15 new themes for the series.

== Marketing ==
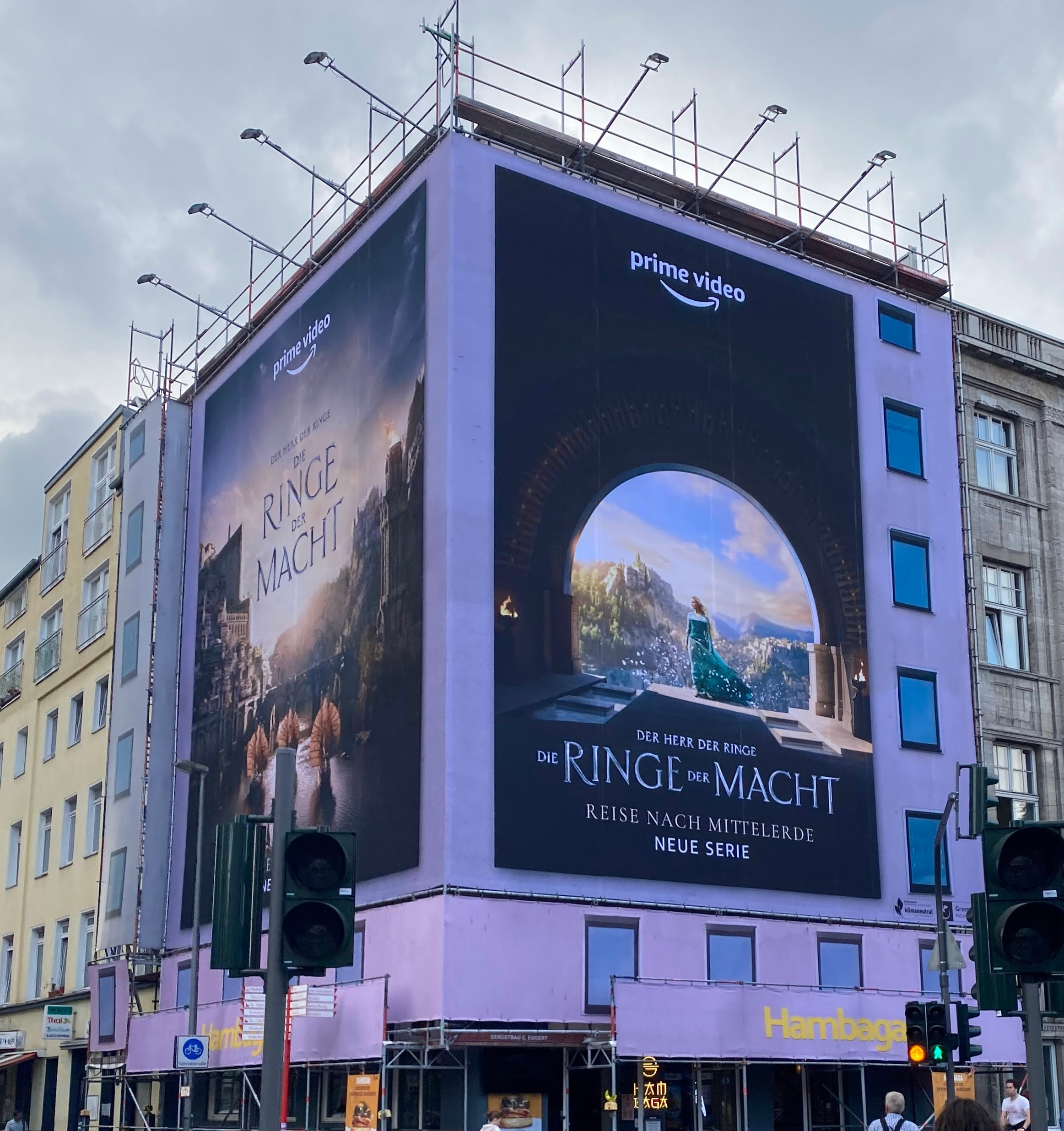
Marketing for the first season in Cologne, Germany

Early promotional work for the series on social media used several maps of Middle-earth's Second Age, as well as excerpts from the novel The Lord of the Rings. These maps were designed and created by illustrator John Howe and overseen by Tolkien scholar Tom Shippey to ensure they were accurate to Tolkien's works. Howe and Shippey spent a lot of time working on the maps, which were based on maps of Númenor during the Second Age as well as maps of the Third Age that were created by Tolkien's son Christopher. Despite their efforts, HarperCollins received complaints from fans shortly after the maps were released online regarding two mistakes that were made on them.

Amazon considered the reveal of the series' title in January 2022 to be crucial as the beginning of the series' marketing campaign. The studio released an announcement video in which the letters of the title are physically cast from molten metal while an excerpt of the Ring Verse poem from The Lord of the Rings is read in voiceover. The video was directed by Klaus Obermeyer, who worked with special effects supervisor Lee Nelson under advisement by veteran special effects supervisor Douglas Trumbull. They filmed the video with foundryman Landon Ryan in late 2021 in Los Angeles, after experimenting with different combinations of metals, sparkler dust, argon pours, and liquid hydrogen. The final metal was a mixture of bronze and aluminum which was poured into molds of compressed sand that could be used multiple times. The pouring was filmed at 5,000 frames per second with a Phantom Flex4K camera so it could be shown in ultra-slow motion. For the final title card, the forged letters were inscribed with Elvish writing and placed on a large piece of redwood. Staff from Tolkien fan website TheOneRing.net and entertainment journalists were invited by Amazon to watch the filming of the video. Prologue Films provided previsualization for the sequence as well as compositing and additional visual effects. They recreated the final title card digitally, taking care to maintain the "integrity of the live action shots and lighting".

A new book chronicling the events of Middle-earth's Second Age was announced in June 2022. Titled The Fall of Númenor, it was compiled and edited by Tolkien scholar Brian Sibley from J. R. R. and Christopher Tolkien's writings about the Second Age. The book features new illustrations by Alan Lee. It was published in November 2022 to capitalize on new interest in the topic arising from the first season's release. Similarly, a new edition of Tolkien's poetry collection The Adventures of Tom Bombadil (1962) was released in August 2024 to coincide with the second season's release.

== Release ==
The Lord of the Rings: The Rings of Power premiered on Prime Video in the United States on September 1, 2022. Episodes are released in more than 240 countries and territories at the same time as in the US.

In September 2026, the first two seasons were made available on the Finnish streaming service Yle Areena, which secured "pay 2 window" rights (for projects that have already been released for a period of time). Ahead of the third season's release that November, a home media release for the first two seasons was announced. Each release features the eight episodes of the respective season along with behind-the-scenes content. They were released on 4K Ultra HD, Blu-ray, and DVD on November 3, and in limited edition 4K UHD SteelBook—with Amazon exclusive collectable art cards—on December 1.

== Reception ==
=== Viewership ===
Amazon announced that The Rings of Power had been watched by 25 million viewers globally in the first 24 hours that the first two episodes were available on Prime Video, the service's biggest premiere ever. This was the first time Amazon had publicly stated viewership data for Prime Video and the company did not specify how much of an episode a user needed to watch for them to count as a viewer. By December 2022, the series had been watched by more than 100 million viewers globally and was Prime Video's most watched series ever. Sanders called it "a tremendous success", and explained that, in addition to viewership, the company measured its success based on new signups to Prime Video and impacts on other areas of its business such as retail and music; for example, Sanders said the first season led to spikes in the sales of Tolkien's books. In April 2023, Kim Masters at The Hollywood Reporter reported that the season was only finished by 37 percent of its initial US viewers and 45 percent of international viewers. Salke said attempts to paint the series as less than a success did not reflect Amazon's internal discussions. In October 2024, she said the first season had been watched by more than 150 million viewers, and it was still the most-watched season on Prime Video globally.

Third-party analytics companies estimated that there was a significant drop in interest from the premiere episodes of the first season to those of the second, with Samba TV and Luminate both calculating around half as much US viewership for the second season's premiere compared to the first's. Amazon said the second season was watched by 40 million viewers globally in its first 11 days of release, making it one of the top five most watched television seasons on Prime Video in that timeframe. This increased to 55 million viewers ahead of the season finale, and the company expected more "growth and momentum" for the season over time. James Hibberd of The Hollywood Reporter said Amazon's "spin" on the second season's initial viewership was that a drop was inevitable due to how high the first season's numbers were. The company said the series had particular success in markets outside of the US, including the UK where it performed "disproportionately well". By February 2025, the second season of The Rings of Power was Prime Video's most-watched returning season by number of hours watched. That October, Lesley Goldberg of The Ankler reported that the second season was finished by 10 percent more of its initial viewers than the first season was.

Parrot Analytics calculated that the series brought in $367 million in subscriber revenue for Prime Video by the end of 2024. This was ahead of fellow Prime Video fantasy series The Wheel of Time ($360 million), which premiered a year before The Rings of Power in 2021. However, The Wheel of Time was considered to have a higher return on investment due to its smaller budget at around $80 million for its first season.

=== Critical response ===
Critical response of The Lord of the Rings: The Rings of Power
Season	Rotten Tomatoes	Metacritic
1	84% (487 reviews)	71 (40 reviews)
2	85% (173 reviews)	67 (25 reviews)
3	86% (72 reviews)	65 (16 reviews)

Review aggregator website Rotten Tomatoes calculated that 84% of 487 critics reviews for the first season were positive, and the average of rated reviews was 7.3 out of 10. The website's critics consensus reads, "It may not yet be the One Show to Rule Them All, but The Rings of Power enchants with its opulent presentation and deeply-felt rendering of Middle-earth." Metacritic assigned a weighted average score of 71 out of 100 based on 40 reviews, indicating a "generally favorable" response. Particular praise went to the visuals and designs, while the overall structure, slow pacing, and reliance on mystery box–style storytelling were criticized.

For the second season, Rotten Tomatoes calculated that 85% of 173 critics reviews were positive, and the average of rated reviews was 7.3 out of 10. The website's critics consensus reads, "The Rings of Power's sophomore season discovers new virtues while retaining some of its predecessor's vices, overall making for a more kinetic journey through Tolkien's world." Metacritic assigned a score of 67 out of 100 based on 25 reviews, again indicating a "generally favorable" response. Critics broadly felt that the series' production value remained high, with praise for the visuals, design work, and McCreary's score. The season was also seen to be more confident in its storytelling than the first, though some critics said it still had pacing issues and too many storylines—including multiple new characters and creatures.

86% of 72 critics on Rotten Tomatoes gave the third season a positive review, and the average of rated reviews was 7.35 out of 10. The critics consensus reads, "The Rings of Power refreshes its journey through Middle-earth, refining its focus and shifting power into the hands of its most compelling characters while solidifying its place as a worthy prequel to The Lord of the Rings." Metacritic assigned a weighted average score of 65 out of 100 based on 16 reviews, indicating another "generally favorable" response. Critics continued to highlight the series' visuals and the performances of the cast, and found the season to be more focused than the previous two. Some still criticized the pacing and the large amount of lore.

=== Audience response ===
The series' early marketing led to a "cacophony" of online fan discourse, including concerns about accuracy to Tolkien. After it premiered, the audience rating on Rotten Tomatoes was considerably lower than the critics rating. This was partially attributed to review bombing for "perceived cultural or political issues", but also to fan concerns about the story, acting, and pacing. These online responses were analyzed and discussed, with particular coverage going to complaints about the casting of non-white actors. Many commentators characterized this backlash as being racist. Amazon did a study with thousands of audience members to get insight into their thoughts on each episode of the first season. The day after the second season premiered, its audience rating on Rotten Tomatoes was nearly double that of the first season. Sanders said the second season had not faced the same "racist hostility" as the first and Amazon found the majority of viewers to be open minded, engaged with the series, and not following an "agenda that's separate from the show itself".

=== Accolades ===
The first season was nominated for six Primetime Creative Arts Emmy Awards, two Art Directors Guild Awards (winning both), a Costume Designers Guild Award, a Critics' Choice Television Award and two Critics' Choice Super Awards, a People's Choice Award, two Saturn Awards, a Screen Actors Guild Award, and seven Visual Effects Society Awards (winning three), among others. The second season was nominated for a Primetime Creative Arts Emmy Award, an Art Directors Guild Award, a British Academy Television Craft Award (which it won), a Costume Designers Guild Award, a Make-Up Artists & Hair Stylists Guild Award, a Saturn Award, and three Visual Effects Society Awards, among others.
