= Daniel Weyman =

British actor

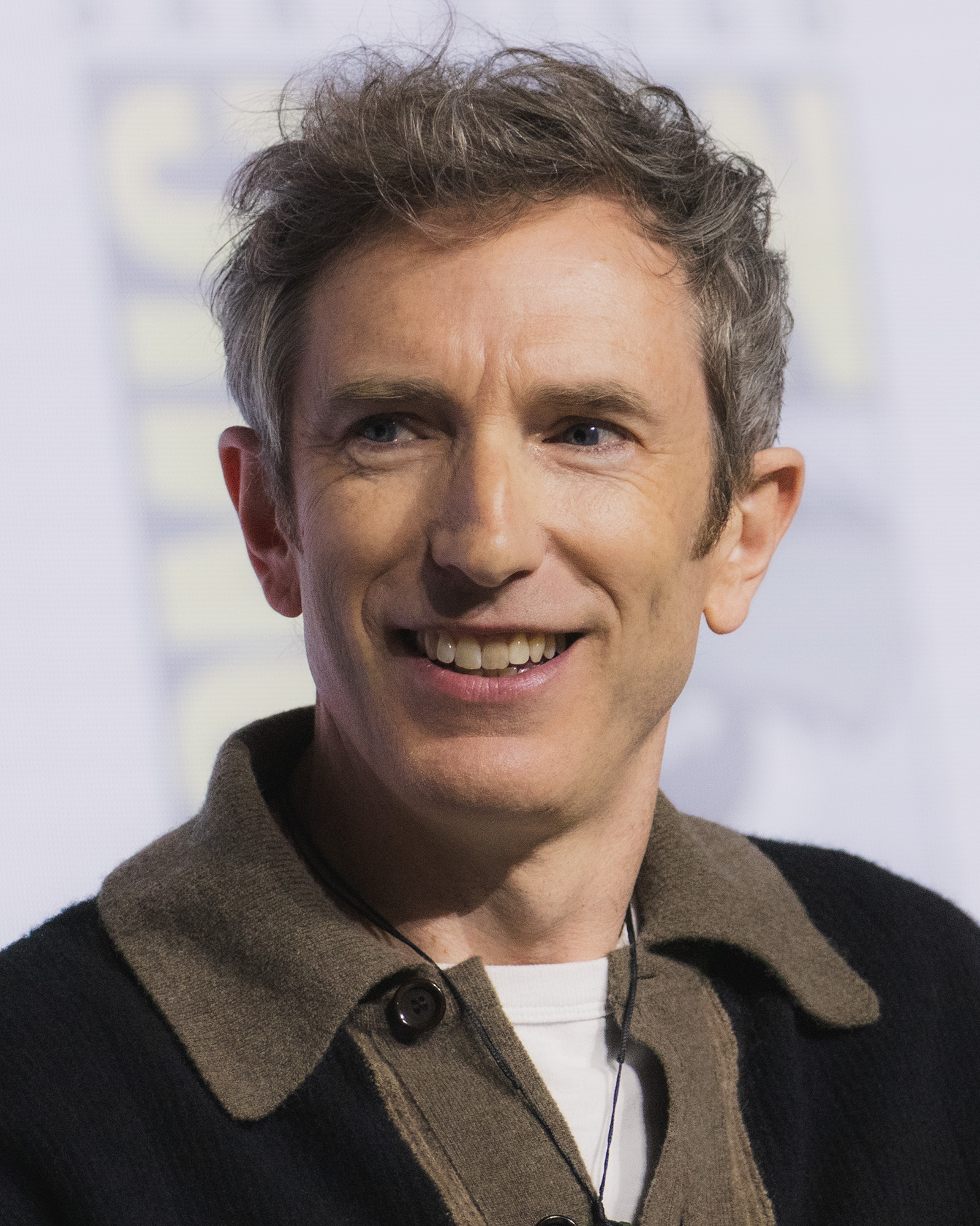
- Weyman in 2026
- Born: Daniel Max Weyman; 1977 (age 48–49); Newcastle, Tyne and Wear, England
- Education: Nottingham New Theatre
- Occupation: Actor

Daniel Max Weyman (born 1977) is an English actor notable for his main roles in Just Inès (2010), Foyle's War (2013), and Silent Witness (2016), and more recently known for his role as The Stranger / Gandalf in The Lord of the Rings: The Rings of Power (2022–present).

== Early life ==
Daniel Max Weyman was born in Newcastle-upon-Tyne in 1977 to Richard S. Weyman (born 1945) and Judith Weyman. He has an older sister, Nicola, and a younger brother, George.

== Education ==
Weyman trained at the Nottingham New Theatre, graduating in 2000.

== Career ==
=== Theatre ===
He has appeared in stage productions such as Samuel West's Sheffield Crucible production of As You Like It (as Jaques) and the Chichester Festival Theatre's production of David Edgar's The Life and Adventures of Nicholas Nickleby. His portrayal of the title character earned him a nomination for 'Best Performance in a Play' at the 2006 TMA Awards. He played Anitpholus of Syracuse in the Whatsonstage.com Awards Best Shakespearean Production nominated The Comedy of Errors at the Open Air Theatre, Regent's Park in 2010. His work includes Kafka's Dick and King Lear at Theatre Royal, Bath, The Crucible directed by Tom Morris at the Bristol Old Vic (2015), and 4000 Days opposite Alistair McGowan at the Park Theatre (2016). He starred as Miles in Rex Pickett's adaptation of his own book, Sideways at the St James Theatre (2016) - the part made famous by Paul Giamatti in Alexander Payne's Oscar winning film adaptation of the same name. He earned rave reviews starring opposite Oscar winner F. Murray Abraham in Daniel Kehlman's new play The Mentor, directed by Laurence Boswell which transferred from the Ustinov Studio to the West End's Vaudeville Theatre (2018).

=== Television ===
Appearances include the 2005 Colditz and the BAFTA winning BBC drama Dunkirk. He played Matthew Cole in the 2004 Midsomer Murders episode "The Straw Woman". He appeared in the award-winning Van Gogh: Painted with Words for the BBC in 2010. In 2013 he starred in Series 8 of Foyle's War for ITV, playing Adam Wainwright, the husband of the character played by Honeysuckle Weeks. In 2013 he played Alec Legge in Agatha Christie's Dead Man's Folly again on ITV. This was the last episode ever filmed by David Suchet as Poirot although it was the penultimate episode to air. In 2014 he reprised his role as Adam Wainwright in Series 9 of Foyle's War which was the last series produced. In 2016, Daniel played Max Thorndyke in the BBC1 drama Silent Witness series 20. His character is the husband of regular character Clarissa Mullery (Liz Carr). The new storyline was very well received and Daniel returned in series 21. In 2018, Daniel appeared in Vera opposite Brenda Blethyn. He played Northumbrian park ranger Jim Briscoe. In 2020, he was cast as the Stranger in the television series The Lord of the Rings: The Rings of Power, later revealed to be Gandalf.

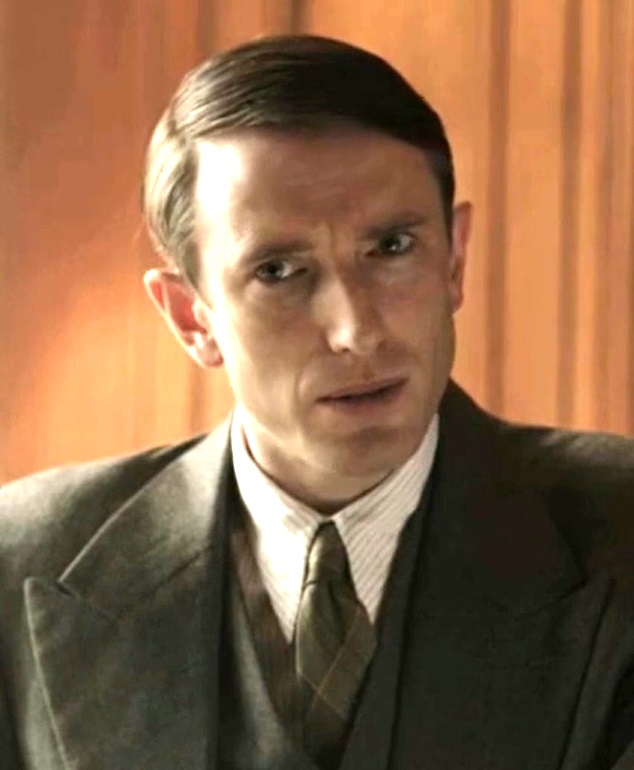
Daniel Weyman in Foyle's War, 2013

=== Film ===
He played Tom Jackson in his first lead cinema role in the film Just Inès (2010) and Arthur Havisham to Helena Bonham Carter's Miss Havisham in Mike Newell's film version of Great Expectations (2012). He has filmed scenes for Rupert Everett's film about Oscar Wilde, The Happy Prince, and Amma Asante's World War II forbidden love story, Where Hands Touch.

=== Audio ===
He has guest starred in the Sapphire and Steel audio drama Perfect Day along with the Doctor Who audio drama The Butcher of Brisbane and won the Audible Best Narrator of 2017 award.

He has worked extensively in radio, audiobook and voice over. His reading of Andy McNab and Robert Rigby's Meltdown was voted No. 1 in the Independent's Top 10 Children's audiobooks 2008. His reading of Young Sherlock Holmes: Death Cloud won a prestigious Best Audiobook of the Year Award from American publication AudioFile magazine. In 2013 the American Library Association entered his recording of Angelmaker by Nick Harkaway in The Listen List, their top 12 examples of outstanding audiobook narration whilst his recording of Crusher by Niall Leonard, made the ALA's Amazing Audiobooks for Young Adults list.

== Filmography ==
=== Film ===
Year	Title	Role	Director	Notes
2004	Millions	Bright Eyed Young Man	Danny Boyle	
2010	Just Inès	Tom Jackson	Marcel Grant	
2012	Day of the Flowers	Martin	John Roberts	
2012	Great Expectations	Arthur Havisham	Mike Newell	
2018	The Happy Prince	Beauchamp Denis Brown	Rupert Everett	Uncredited
2018	Where Hands Touch	Unknown	Amma Asante	

=== Television ===
Year	Title	Role	Notes
2004	Wire in the Blood	Luke Fraser	Episode: "Still She Cries"
2004	Midsomer Murders	Matthew Cole	Episode: "The Straw Woman"
2004	Dunkirk	Capt. James Lynn-Allen	3 episodes
2005	Colditz	Bell	Episode: "Part 2"
2005	The Slavery Business	Samuel Wilberforce	Episode: "Breaking the Chains"
2009	Doctors	Miles Temple	Episode: "Shadow"
2010	Holby City	Lt. Tom Scott	Episode: "Talk to Me"
2010	Van Gogh: Painted with Words	Anthon van Rappard	Television film
2013	Poirot	Alec Legge	Episode: "Dead Man's Folly"
2013–2015	Foyle's War	Adam Wainwright	6 episodes
2017–2020	Silent Witness	Max Thorndyke	12 episodes
2018	Vera	Jim Briscoe	Episode: "Darkwater"
2018	A Very English Scandal	BBC TV Reporter	Episode: "Episode #1.3"
2019	Gentleman Jack	Dr. Kenny	2 episodes
2019	Treadstone	Macy	Episode: "The Cicada Protocol"
2021	The North Water	Man	Episode: "Homo Homini Lupus"
2022–present	The Lord of the Rings: The Rings of Power	The Stranger / Gandalf	15 episodes
