= Marcel Grant =

- Born: London, UK
- Occupations: Film director, screenwriter, film producer
- Years active: 2000–present

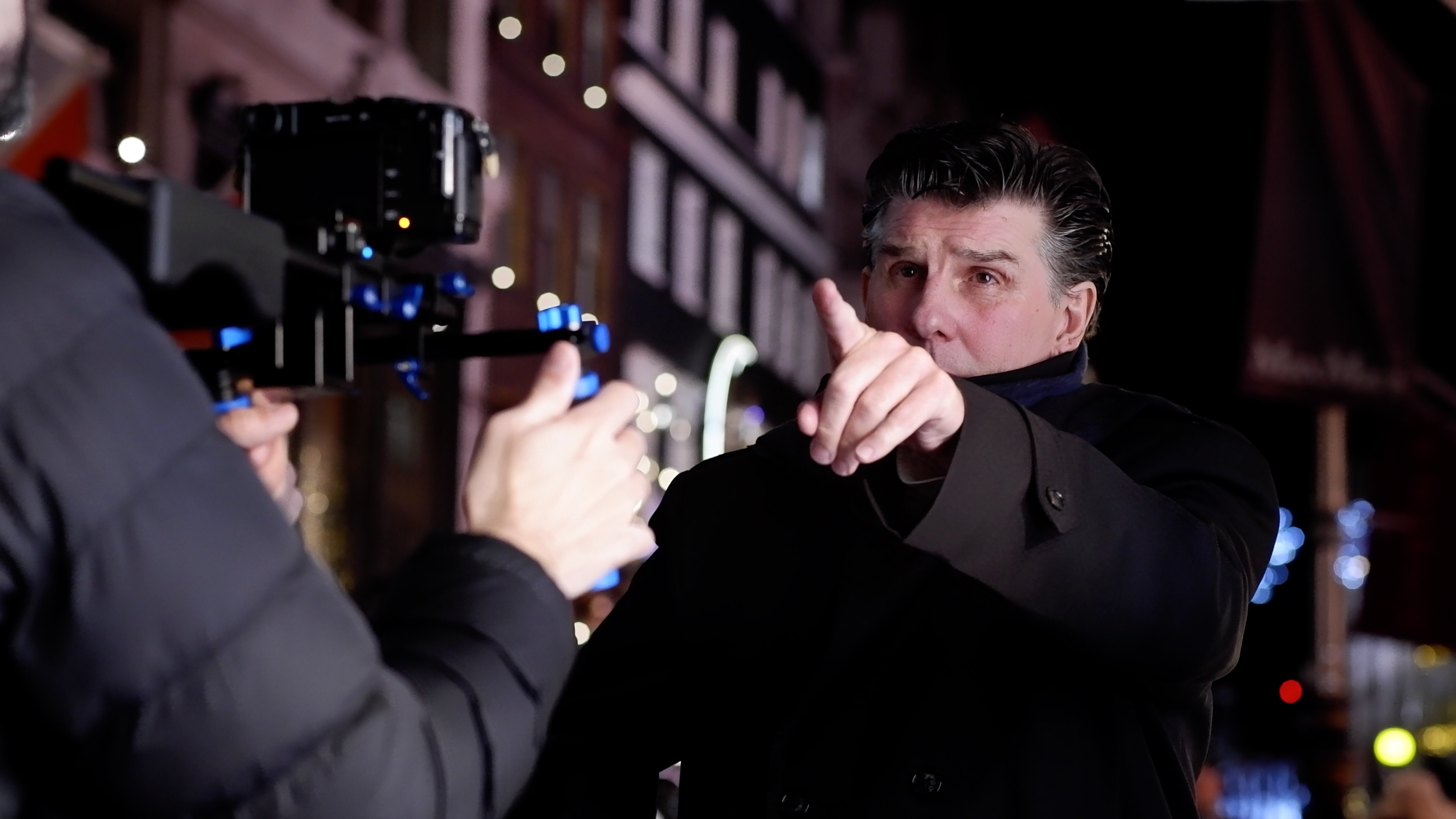
Marcel Grant filming

Marcel Grant is a British independent filmmaker based in London, who has written and directed four feature films, Open My Eyes (2024) Coffee Sex You (2014), Just Inès (2010), and What's Your Name 41? (2005). He has recently completed a documentary film The Late Great ‘78 (Glamour's Golden Sunset) about the London, New York and Paris club scene of the late 1970's, featuring Grace Jones and Amanda Lear, and due for release in 2026.

== Career ==
In 2004, Grant became an independent filmmaker and established the film production company Shipwreck Film, where he shot four short films, as well as his first feature What's Your Name 41? (2005) starring Con O'Neill and Ann Mitchell. The film was shown at several international film festivals, including Raindance Film Festival, the Berlin International Directors Lounge and the California Independent Film Festival.

Grant subsequently wrote, directed and produced three further feature films: Just Inès (2010); Coffee Sex You (2014); and the soon to be released Open My Eyes (2024) starring Oliver Tobias and Alissa Jung. Just Inès starring Daniel Weyman and the French actress Caroline Ducey had its world premier at the Mannheim-Heidelberg International Film Festival (2010) and was then screened at the Cairo International Film Festival and FEST Belgrade Serbia. He is currently filming 'Dead Right for Bloomsbury' a documentary film about 'London... a journey through the eyes of a Londoner', and the feature film 'I Want to Marry Someone who has Never been Kissed in a Car' starring Caroline Ducey.

Soho House commissioned Grant to direct and produce their Electric Cinema's How To Behave, starring Benedict Cumberbatch, Natalie Dormer, Michael McIntyre, Nigella Lawson, James Corden, Rafe Spall, Emilia Fox, amongst others.
