= Sharon Tal Yguado =

Israeli-American media executive

- שרון טל יגואדו
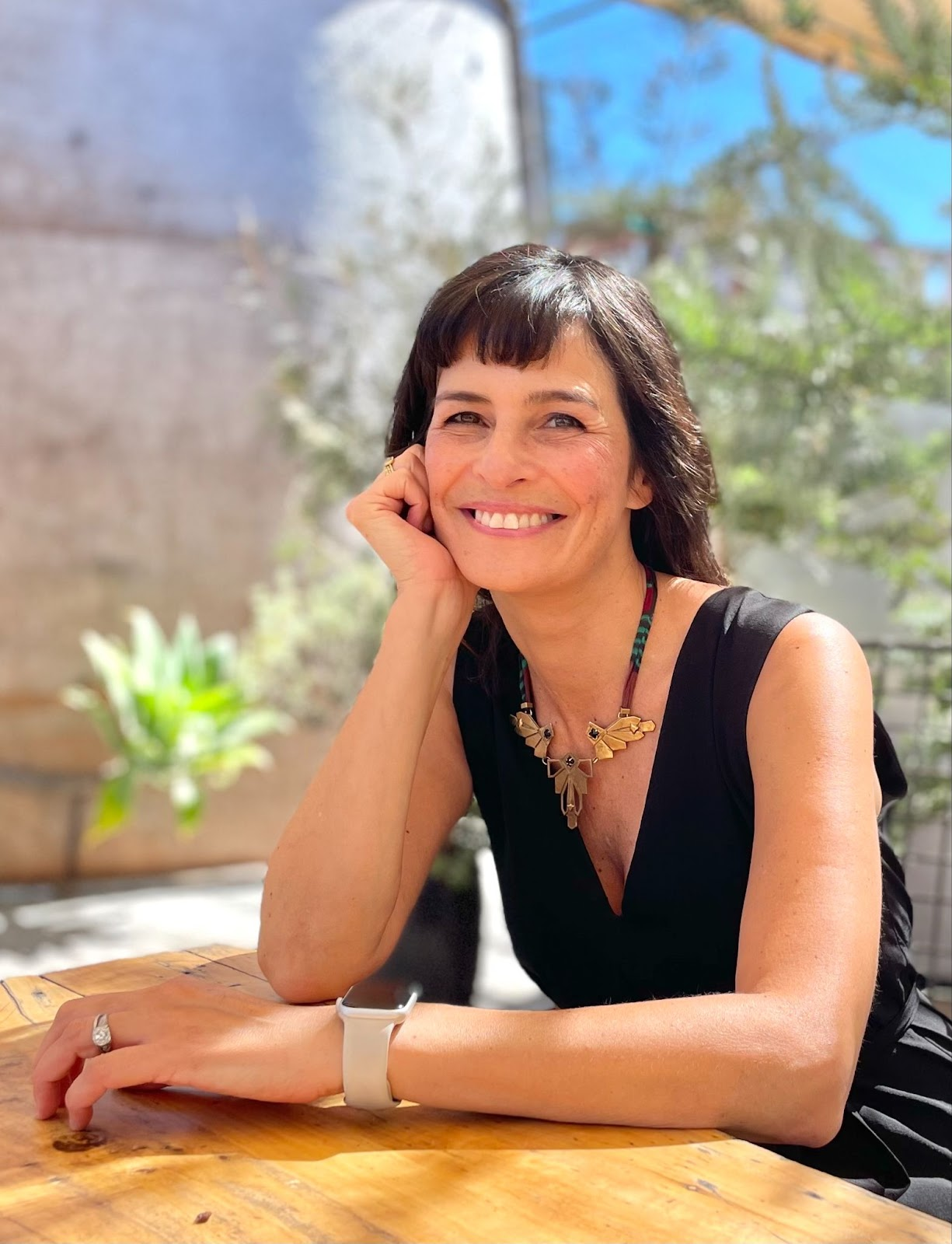
- Born: Israel
- Occupation: Media executive
- Known for: Building studio divisions at Amazon and Fox, producing and overseeing fantasy and science fiction projects including The Walking Dead, The Boys, The Lord of the Rings: The Rings of Power, The Wheel of Time, and Invincible

Sharon Tal Yguado (Hebrew: שרון טל יגואדו) is an Israeli-born American media executive.

Yguado has built studio divisions at media companies including Amazon and Fox. She is known for her work on fantasy and science fiction projects including The Walking Dead, The Boys, The Lord of the Rings: The Rings of Power, The Wheel of Time, and Invincible. In her role as head of scripted programming at Amazon she also oversaw numerous original shows, including The Marvelous Mrs. Maisel, Fleabag, Homecoming, Jack Ryan and Good Omens. Yguado also served as the head of Fox International Studios and Global Programming at Fox Networks Group.

== Biography ==
Yguado was born in Israel.

In 2004, Yguado moved to Italy and started her career as VP of Programming at Fox International Channels, where she was responsible for the global programming strategy. In 2008 she moved back to the US, and in 2010 was promoted to a Senior Vice President role.

In 2011, Yguado partnered with AMC on The Walking Dead. She finalized the deal with AMC at a script stage and bought the rights for the show for territories outside the United States and Canada.

In 2012, Yguado was promoted to an Executive Vice President role. In 2015, she started a new studio division for Fox International Channels, called Fox International Studios. In this new role, she produced and co-produced original global content for Fox's international channels, partnering with Robert Kirkman to produce his next TV show Outcast. The show ran for two seasons on Cinemax in the US and all of Fox's cable channels outside the US.

In 2017, Yguado was hired by Amazon Studios in a senior leadership position to start a new entertainment division, focusing on large franchises in the genres of fantasy and sci-fi. In this role, Yguado identified, developed, and produced numerous shows. The first show she picked up was The Boys. The show was launched in late 2019 and became a success story for Amazon; it ran for five seasons and has several spinoffs.

In October 2017, Yguado was promoted to take over all scripted programming at Amazon Studios, including responsibility for all Amazon drama and comedy shows, such as The Marvelous Mrs. Maisel, Fleabag, Homecoming, Jack Ryan, and Good Omens. One of her notable projects and credits was The Lord of the Rings: The Rings of Power project, which she spearheaded for Amazon. She led the partnership and pitched the show to the Tolkien Estate, Warner Bros., and HarperCollins, ultimately winning the rights in a bidding war with Netflix, HBO, and Apple. In 2017, Yguado announced the pickup of the series. She acted as the point creative executive on the project and was responsible for selecting and approving the writers and producers on the show.

In 2018, Yguado developed the show The Wheel of Time. Yguado also brought Jonathan Nolan and Lisa Joy to Amazon to make the show The Peripheral.

In May 2019, Yguado left Amazon, but retained her role as an executive producer for Rings. The show premiered in September 2022 and was reportedly watched by more than 25 million viewers worldwide.

As of 2024, Yguado is the founder and CEO of Astrid Entertainment and is an investor and advisor at Husslup and Hinterland. She is also a board member at RACAT, Echo Horizon School, and Hernan Lopez Family Foundation.
