= La Chambre obscure =

- Directed by: Marie-Christine Questerbert
- Written by: Marie-Christine Questerbert
- Produced by: Raymond Blumenthal; Jimmy de Brabant (associate producer); Sylvain Bursztejn (delegate producer)
- Starring: Caroline Ducey; Melvil Poupaud; Mathieu Demy; Sylvie Testud
- Cinematography: Emmanuel Machuel
- Edited by: Catherine Quesemand
- Production companies: Blue Films; Canal+ Centre National de la Cinématographie (CNC); Delux Productions; Eurimages; Fonds National de Soutien à la Production Audiovisuelle du Luxembourg; Gam Films; Parnasse International
- Distributed by: Les Films du Paradoxe
- Release date: 29 November 2000
- Running time: 107 minutes
- Countries: France; Luxembourg; Canada; Italy
- Language: French

La Chambre obscure (French pronunciation: [la ʃɑ̃bʁ ɔpskyʁ]; English title: The Dark Room) is a 2000 French drama film directed and written by Marie-Christine Questerbert.

== Cast ==
- Caroline Ducey as Aliénor
- Melvil Poupaud as Bertrand
- Mathieu Demy as Thomas
- Sylvie Testud as Azalaïs
- Jackie Berroyer as The king
- Hugues Quester as Ambrogio
- Alice Houri as Lisotta
- Pierre Baillot as Maître Gérard de Narbonne
- Dimitri Rataud as Marc
- Christian Cloarec as Guillaume
- Édith Scob as The widow
- Luis Rego as The confessor
- Thibault de Montalembert
