= Just Inès =

- Original poster
- Directed by: Marcel Grant
- Written by: Marcel Grant
- Produced by: Marcel Grant; Richard Thompson
- Starring: Caroline Ducey; Daniel Weyman; Veronica Roberts
- Cinematography: Michael Elphick
- Edited by: Kant Pan
- Music by: Michael J. McEvoy
- Production company: Dancing Brave Pictures
- Distributed by: Synkronized (US)
- Release date: 14 November 2010
- Running time: 93 minutes
- Country: United Kingdom
- Language: English

Just Inès is a 2010 British film written and directed by Marcel Grant. The film follows Tom Jackson, played by Daniel Weyman, through a period of redemption after a prison sentence for domestic violence. Only through a new relationship with French girl Inès, played by Caroline Ducey, can he find back his way in life.

The film was shot in United Kingdom and France as an independent production by the London-based production company Dancing Brave Pictures. The film received its world premiere to high acclaim at the 2010 International Filmfestival Mannheim-Heidelberg and was also screened at the 2010 Cairo International Film Festival, Egypt.

== Plot ==
The film starts with a depiction of Tom's current life. A businessman, he is lost in his deals and betrays his wife with a Buddhist girlfriend of his. When his wife threatens to leave him, he loses control and beats her violently. He is sentenced to 6 months in prison.

After being released and having spent some time with his mother and his brother, who live in a trailer park in absence of the early deceased father, he decides to move to London. Overcoming initial problems with the agent regarding his criminal record, he finally moves into a flat in Bloomsbury.

Self-doubt and loneliness now seem to dominate his days. He eventually befriends a young girl called PJ. A friendship develops, which helps Tom regaining a bit of warmth and colour in life. But then Tom meets his beautiful French neighbour Inès. A tender connection develops among them.

This quietly mysterious woman intrigues Tom. When he finds out about her life, it finally puts everything in Tom’s own story into perspective. There might be damage, but there is always hope.

== Cast ==
- Daniel Weyman as Tom Jackson
- Caroline Ducey as Inès Cole
- Barbara Cabrita as Olivia
- Veronica Roberts as Tom's mother
- Alice O'Connell as PJ
