= I Dreamt Under the Water =

- French: J'ai rêvé sous l'eau
- Directed by: Hormoz
- Written by: Hormoz
- Produced by: Philippe Arrizabalaga; Loic Magneron; Sébastien Burnet (executive producer)
- Cinematography: Sébastien Joffard
- Edited by: Franck Nakache
- Music by: David Kelly
- Production companies: Triskel Films; Wide Management
- Distributed by: Optimale-we&co
- Release date: 8 August 2008 (United States)
- Running time: 99 minutes
- Country: France
- Language: French

I Dreamt Under the Water (French: J'ai rêvé sous l'eau) is a 2008 French romantic drama film directed and written by Hormoz. It tells the story of a bisexual man longing for love, who becomes a male sex worker.

== Cast ==
- Hubert Benhamdine as Antonin
- Caroline Ducey as Juliette
- Christine Boisson as Fabienne
- Hicham Nazzal as Baptiste
- Franck Victor as Alex
- Hélène Michel as Babsi
- Eva Ionesco

== See also ==
- List of LGBT-related films by year
