= Caroline Ducey =

French actress

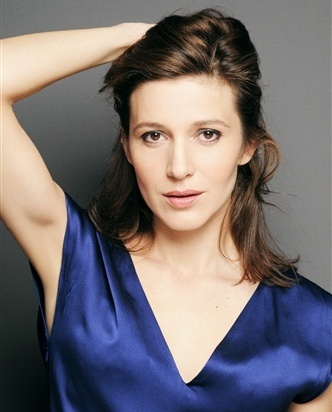
- Ducey in 2015
- Born: Caroline Trousselard; Sainte-Adresse, France
- Occupation: Actress
- Years active: 1994–present

Caroline Ducey (born Caroline Trousselard) is a French actress. Outside of her home country, she is best known for her controversial role in Catherine Breillat's 1999 film Romance, for which she was awarded the 2000 Étoile d’or de la révélation féminine (Gold Star) by l'Académie de la presse du cinéma français.

== Early life and education ==
Caroline Ducey was born Caroline Trousselard in Sainte-Adresse, France.

== Career ==
Ducey has had an extensive career in French films.

== Other activities ==
In 2000, Ducey was a member of the jury at the 22nd Moscow International Film Festival.

== Recognition and awards ==
Ducey was nominated for the Prix Michel Simon for Familles je vous hais (1997).

She was awarded the 2000 Étoile d'or de la révélation féminine (Gold Star) by l'Académie de la presse du cinéma français for her role in Romance. Also in 2000, she received a Shooting Stars Award from European Film Promotion.

== Filmography ==
- Trop de bonheur (1994) a.k.a. Too Much Happiness
- Noël! Noël! (1995)
- Familles je vous hais (1997)
- Romance (1999)
- Innocent (1999)
- Le Trèfle à quatre feuilles (2000)
- Porte-bonheur (2000)
- La Chambre obscure (2000)
- Entre deux rails (2001)
- Carrément à l'Ouest (2001)
- La Cage (2002) a.k.a. The Cage
- Prendimi l'anima (2002) a.k.a. The Soul Keeper
- Shimkent hôtel (2003)
- Three-Step Dance (2003)
- Amateur (2004)
- Croisière (2004)
- Handicap (2004)
- Doo Wop (2004)
- Les Étrangers (2004)
- Naissance de l'orgueil (2005)
- J'ai besoin d'air (2005)
- Convivium (2005)
- J'ai rêvé sous l'eau (2005) a.k.a. I Dreamt Under Water
- La Californie (2006)
- Une vieille maîtresse (2007) a.k.a. The Last Mistress
- J'ai rêvé sous l'eau (2008) a.k.a. I Dreamt Under the Water
- Le Plaisir de chanter (2008)
- Just Ines (2010)
- Open my eyes, close my eyes (2012)
- Bangkok Renaissance (2012)
- Le Dernier Clan (2012)
- Hôtel du paradis (2012)
- Simple Passion (2020)

=== Television ===
- Tous les garçons et les filles de leur âge... episode – Bonheur (1994)
- L'Inventaire (1998)
- L'Amour prisonnier (2000)
- Petit Ben (2000)
- Reporters (2007)
- Les Bleus: premiers pas dans la police episode – Faux semblants (2007)
