= 2003 in the United States =

- Decades: 1980s; 1990s; 2000s; 2010s; 2020s
- See also: History of the United States (1991–2016); Timeline of United States history (1990–2009); List of years in the United States

Events from the year 2003 in the United States.

== Incumbents ==
=== Federal government ===
- President: George W. Bush (R-Texas)
- Vice President: Dick Cheney (R-Wyoming)
- Chief Justice: William Rehnquist (Virginia)
- Speaker of the House of Representatives: Dennis Hastert (R-Illinois)
- Senate Majority Leader:

Tom Daschle (D-South Dakota) (until January 3)
Bill Frist (R-Tennessee) (starting January 3)

- Congress: 107th (until January 3), 108th (starting January 3)

==== State governments ====
Governors and lieutenant governors

=== Governors ===
- Governor of Alabama: Don Siegelman (Democratic) (until January 20), Bob Riley (Republican) (starting January 20)
- Governor of Alaska: Frank Murkowski (Republican)
- Governor of Arizona: Jane Dee Hull (Republican) (until January 6), Janet Napolitano (Democratic) (starting January 6)
- Governor of Arkansas: Mike Huckabee (Republican)
- Governor of California: Gray Davis (Democratic) (until November 17), Arnold Schwarzenegger (Republican) (starting November 17)
- Governor of Colorado: Bill Owens (Republican)
- Governor of Connecticut: John G. Rowland (Republican)
- Governor of Delaware: Ruth Ann Minner (Democratic)
- Governor of Florida: Jeb Bush (Republican)
- Governor of Georgia: Roy Barnes (Democratic) (until January 13), Sonny Perdue (Republican) (starting January 13)
- Governor of Hawaii: Linda Lingle (Republican)
- Governor of Idaho: Dirk Kempthorne (Republican)
- Governor of Illinois: George Ryan (Republican) (until January 13), Rod Blagojevich (Democratic) (starting January 13)
- Governor of Indiana: Frank O'Bannon (Democratic) (until September 13), Joe Kernan (Democratic) (starting September 13)
- Governor of Iowa: Tom Vilsack (Democratic)
- Governor of Kansas: Bill Graves (Republican) (until January 13), Kathleen Sebelius (Democratic) (starting January 13)
- Governor of Kentucky: Paul E. Patton (Democratic) (until December 9), Ernie Fletcher (Republican) (starting December 9)
- Governor of Louisiana: Murphy J. Foster, Jr. (Republican)
- Governor of Maine: Angus King (Independent) (until January 8), John Baldacci (Democratic) (starting January 8)
- Governor of Maryland: Parris N. Glendening (Democratic) (until January 15), Robert L. Ehrlich, Jr. (Republican) (starting January 15)
- Governor of Massachusetts: Jane Swift (Republican) (until January 2), Mitt Romney (Republican) (starting January 2)
- Governor of Michigan: John Engler (Republican) (until January 1), Jennifer Granholm (Democratic) (starting January 1)
- Governor of Minnesota: Jesse Ventura (Independence) (until January 6), Tim Pawlenty (Republican) (starting January 6)
- Governor of Mississippi: Ronnie Musgrove (Democratic)
- Governor of Missouri: Bob Holden (Democratic)
- Governor of Montana: Judy Martz (Republican)
- Governor of Nebraska: Mike Johanns (Republican)
- Governor of Nevada: Kenny Guinn (Republican)
- Governor of New Hampshire: Jeanne Shaheen (Democratic) (until January 9), Craig Benson (Republican) (starting January 9)
- Governor of New Jersey: Jim McGreevey (Democratic)
- Governor of New Mexico: Gary Johnson (Republican) (until January 1), Bill Richardson (Democratic) (starting January 1)
- Governor of New York: George Pataki (Republican)
- Governor of North Carolina: Mike Easley (Democratic)
- Governor of North Dakota: John Hoeven (Republican)
- Governor of Ohio: Bob Taft (Republican)
- Governor of Oklahoma: Frank Keating (Republican) (until January 13), Brad Henry (Democratic) (starting January 13)
- Governor of Oregon: John Kitzhaber (Democratic) (until January 13), Ted Kulongoski (Democratic) (starting January 13)
- Governor of Pennsylvania: Mark S. Schweiker (Republican) (until January 21), Ed Rendell (Democratic) (starting January 21)
- Governor of Rhode Island: Lincoln C. Almond (Republican) (until January 7), Donald Carcieri (Republican) (starting January 7)
- Governor of South Carolina: Jim Hodges (Democratic) (until January 15), Mark Sanford (Republican) (starting January 15)
- Governor of South Dakota: William J. Janklow (Republican) (until January 7), Mike Rounds (Republican) (starting January 7)
- Governor of Tennessee: Don Sundquist (Republican) (until January 18), Phil Bredesen (Democratic) (starting January 18)
- Governor of Texas: Rick Perry (Republican)
- Governor of Utah: Mike Leavitt (Republican) (until November 5), Olene S. Walker (Republican) (starting November 5)
- Governor of Vermont: Howard Dean (Democratic) (until January 9), Jim Douglas (Republican) (starting January 9)
- Governor of Virginia: Mark Warner (Democratic)
- Governor of Washington: Gary Locke (Democratic)
- Governor of West Virginia: Bob Wise (Democratic)
- Governor of Wisconsin: Scott McCallum (Republican) (until January 6), Jim Doyle (Democratic) (starting January 6)
- Governor of Wyoming: Jim Geringer (Republican) (until January 6), Dave Freudenthal (Democratic) (starting January 6)

=== Lieutenant governors ===
- Lieutenant Governor of Alabama: Steve Windom (Republican) (until January 20), Lucy Baxley (Democratic) (starting January 20)
- Lieutenant Governor of Alaska: Loren Leman (Republican)
- Lieutenant Governor of Arkansas: Winthrop Paul Rockefeller (Republican)
- Lieutenant Governor of California: Cruz Bustamante (Democratic)
- Lieutenant Governor of Colorado: Joe Rogers (Republican) (until January 14), Jane Norton (Republican) (starting January 14)
- Lieutenant Governor of Connecticut: Jodi Rell (Republican)
- Lieutenant Governor of Delaware: John Carney (Democratic)
- Lieutenant Governor of Florida: Frank Brogan (Republican) (until March 3), Toni Jennings (Republican) (starting March 3)
- Lieutenant Governor of Georgia: Mark Taylor (Democratic)
- Lieutenant Governor of Hawaii: Duke Aiona (Republican)
- Lieutenant Governor of Idaho: Jack Riggs (Republican) (until January 6), Jim Risch (Republican) (starting January 6)
- Lieutenant Governor of Illinois: Corinne Wood (Republican) (until January 13), Pat Quinn (Democratic) (starting January 13)
- Lieutenant Governor of Indiana:
  - until September 13: Joe E. Kernan (Democratic)
  - September 13-October 20: vacant
  - starting October 20: Kathy Davis (Democratic)
- Lieutenant Governor of Iowa: Sally Pederson (Democratic)
- Lieutenant Governor of Kansas: Gary Sherrer (Republican) (until January 13), John E. Moore (Democratic) (starting January 13)
- Lieutenant Governor of Kentucky: Steve Henry (Democratic) (until December 9), Steve Pence (Republican) (starting December 9)
- Lieutenant Governor of Louisiana: Kathleen Blanco (Democratic)
- Lieutenant Governor of Maryland: Kathleen Kennedy Townsend (Democratic) (until January 15), Michael Steele (Republican) (starting January 15)
- Lieutenant Governor of Massachusetts: Jane Swift (Republican) (until January 2), Kerry Healey (Republican) (starting January 2)
- Lieutenant Governor of Michigan: Dick Posthumus (Republican) (until January 1), John D. Cherry (Democratic) (starting January 1)
- Lieutenant Governor of Minnesota: Mae Schunk (Independence) (until January 6), Carol Molnau (Republican) (starting January 6)
- Lieutenant Governor of Mississippi: Amy Tuck (Republican)
- Lieutenant Governor of Missouri: Joe Maxwell (Democratic)
- Lieutenant Governor of Montana: Karl Ohs (Republican)
- Lieutenant Governor of Nebraska: Dave Heineman (Republican)
- Lieutenant Governor of Nevada: Lorraine Hunt (Republican)
- Lieutenant Governor of New Mexico: Walter Dwight Bradley (Republican) (until January 1), Diane Denish (Democratic) (starting January 1)
- Lieutenant Governor of New York: Mary Donohue (Republican)
- Lieutenant Governor of North Carolina: Bev Perdue (Democratic)
- Lieutenant Governor of North Dakota: Jack Dalrymple (Republican)
- Lieutenant Governor of Ohio: vacant (until January 13), Jennette Bradley (Republican) (starting January 13)
- Lieutenant Governor of Oklahoma: Mary Fallin (Republican)
- Lieutenant Governor of Pennsylvania: Robert Jubelirer (Republican) (until January 21), Catherine Baker Knoll (Democratic) (starting January 21)
- Lieutenant Governor of Rhode Island: Charles J. Fogarty (Democratic)
- Lieutenant Governor of South Carolina: Bob Peeler (Republican) (until January 15), André Bauer (Republican) (starting January 15)
- Lieutenant Governor of South Dakota: Carole Hillard (Republican) (until January 7), Dennis Daugaard (Republican) (starting January 7)
- Lieutenant Governor of Tennessee: John S. Wilder (Democratic)
- Lieutenant Governor of Texas: Bill Ratliff (Republican) (until January 21), David Dewhurst (Republican) (starting January 21)
- Lieutenant Governor of Utah: Olene S. Walker (Republican) (until November 5), Gayle McKeachnie (Republican) (starting November 5)
- Lieutenant Governor of Vermont: Doug Racine (Democratic) (until January 9), Brian Dubie (Republican) (starting January 9)
- Lieutenant Governor of Virginia: Tim Kaine (Democratic)
- Lieutenant Governor of Washington: Brad Owen (Democratic)
- Lieutenant Governor of Wisconsin: Margaret A. Farrow (Republican) (until January 6), Barbara Lawton (Democratic) (starting January 6)

== Events ==
=== January ===
- January – Sky marshals are introduced on U.S. airlines in an attempt to prevent hijackings.
- January 3
  - The 108th United States Congress is sworn in, including incoming freshmen Senators Saxby Chambliss (R-GA), Lindsey Graham (R-SC), John Sununu (R-NH), Lamar Alexander (R-TN), Elizabeth Dole (R-NC), Norm Coleman (R-MN), and Mark Pryor (D-AR).
  - The Ohio State University defeats the University of Miami in double-overtime in the Fiesta Bowl, 31–24, for the national Bowl Championship Series (BCS) title.
- January 4 – In American football, the Atlanta Falcons defeat the Green Bay Packers in a 27–7 upset, handing the Packers their first ever playoff loss at Lambeau Field.
- January 8 – US Airways Express Flight 5481 crashes at Charlotte/Douglas International Airport in Charlotte, North Carolina, killing all 21 people aboard.
- January 15 – Eldred v. Ashcroft: The Supreme Court of the United States allows the extension of copyright terms in the U.S.
- January 16 – STS-107: Space Shuttle Columbia is launched on what turns out to be its last flight.
- January 19 – World Wrestling Entertainment holds its Royal Rumble pay-per-view event from the Fleet Center in Boston, Massachusetts.
- January 23 – The last signal is received from NASA's Pioneer 10 spacecraft, some 7.5 billion miles from Earth.
- January 24 – The newly created United States Department of Homeland Security begins operations.
- January 25 – An international group of volunteers leaves London for Baghdad to act as voluntary human shields, hoping to avert a U.S. invasion.
- January 26 – Super Bowl XXXVII: The Tampa Bay Buccaneers defeat the Oakland Raiders 48–21 at Qualcomm Stadium in San Diego to win their first Super Bowl title.
- January 28 – State of the Union Address.
- January 30 – Iraq disarmament crisis: The leaders of the United Kingdom, Czech Republic, Denmark, Hungary, Italy, Poland, Portugal, Romania and Spain release a statement (The Letter of the Eight) demonstrating support for the United States' plans to invade Iraq.

=== February ===
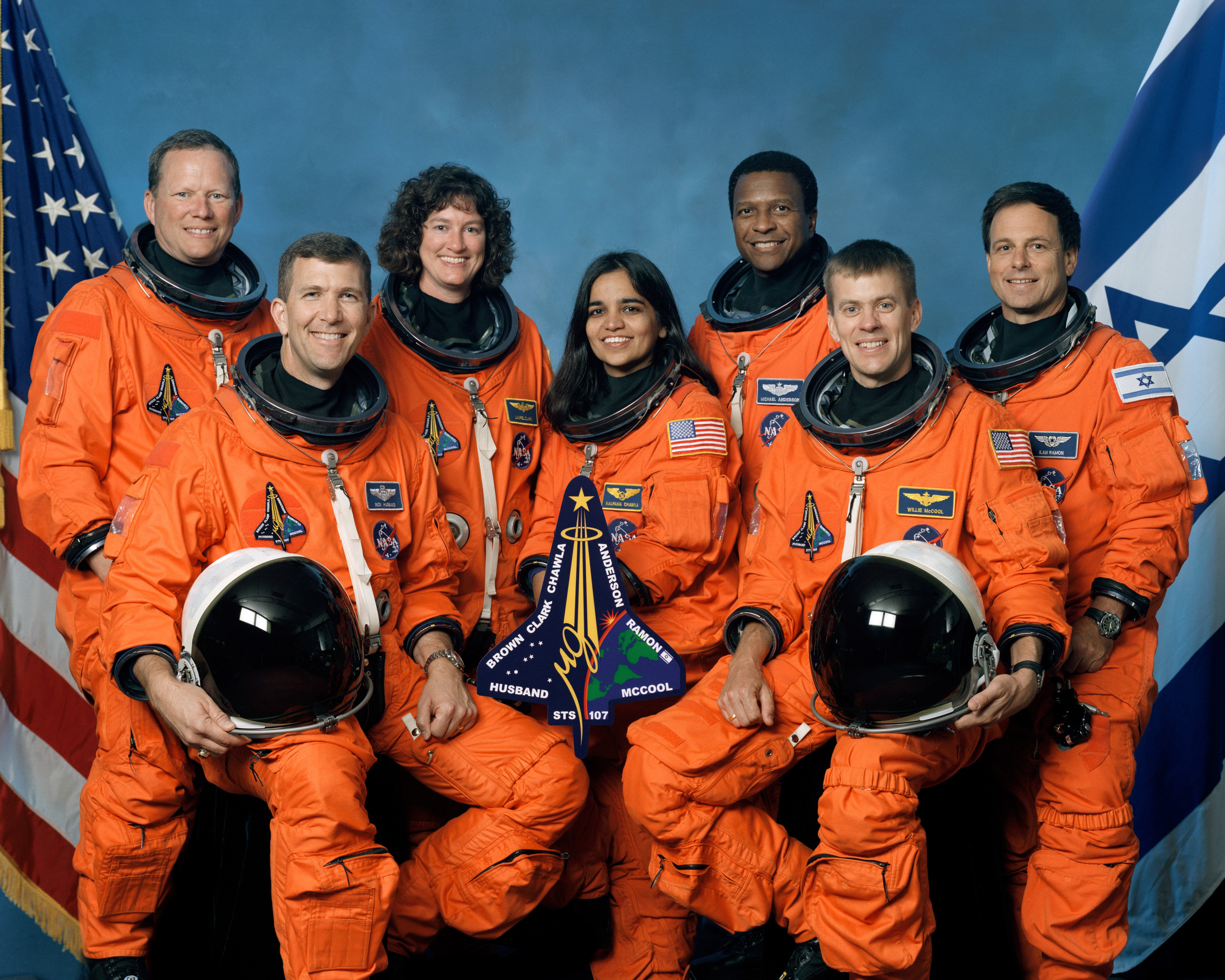
February 1: Space Shuttle Columbia is destroyed on re-entry

- February 1 – STS-107: Space Shuttle Columbia disintegrates over Texas upon re-entry, killing all seven astronauts on board.
- February 3 – John W. Snow is sworn in as the new Secretary of Treasury, succeeding Paul O'Neill.
- February 4 – Four-year-old Sofia Juarez disappears in Kennewick, Washington.
- February 5 – Iraq disarmament crisis: U.S. Secretary of State Colin Powell addresses the UN Security Council on Iraq.
- February 7 – An unsuccessful attempt is made to contact Pioneer 10.
- February 20 – The Station nightclub fire in West Warwick, Rhode Island claims the lives of 100 people.
- February 26 – PixelBlocks are introduced at the American International Toy Fair in New York City.
- February 27 – Fred Rogers, host of the children's television show Mister Rogers' Neighborhood, dies of stomach cancer at the age of 74.

=== March ===
- March 1
  - The Federal Law Enforcement Training Center, the United States Customs Service, and the United States Secret Service move to the United States Department of Homeland Security.
  - The Turkish parliament vetoes U.S. troop access to airbases in Turkey in order to attack Iraq from the north. The Bush administration starts working on Plan B, namely attacking Iraq from the south, through the Persian Gulf.
- March 5 – Lockyer v. Andrade, Ewing v. California: In two separate opinions, the Supreme Court of the United States, by 5–4 margins, upholds California's "three strikes" law.
- March 11 – Iraq disarmament crisis: Iraqi fighters threaten two U.S. U-2 surveillance planes, on missions for U.N. weapons inspectors, forcing them to abort their mission and return to base.
- March 16 – Iraq disarmament crisis: The leaders of the United States, Britain, Portugal, and Spain meet at a summit in the Azores Islands. U.S. President Bush calls March 17 the "moment of truth", meaning that the "coalition of the willing" will make its final effort to extract a resolution from the U.N. Security Council, giving Iraq an ultimatum to disarm immediately or be disarmed by force.
- March 17 – Iraq disarmament crisis: U.S. President George W. Bush gives an ultimatum: Iraqi leader Saddam Hussein and his sons must either leave Iraq, or face military action at a time of the U.S.'s choosing.
- March 18
  - FBI agents raid the corporate headquarters of HealthSouth Corporation in Birmingham, Alabama, on suspicion of massive corporate fraud led by the company's top executives.
  - About $1 billion is taken from Iraq's Central Bank by Saddam Hussein and his family, just hours before the United States begins bombing Iraq.
- March 19 – The first American bombs drop on Baghdad after Iraqi President Saddam Hussein and his sons do not comply with U.S. President George W. Bush's 48-hour mandate demanding their exit from Iraq.
- March 20 – The US-led Iraq War begins.
- March 22 – The United States and the United Kingdom begin their shock and awe campaign, with a massive air strike on military targets in Baghdad.
- March 23
  - Hasan Akbar, a Muslim soldier with the 101st Airborne, kills two fellow soldiers in a grenade attack at Camp Pennsylvania, Kuwait.
  - The 75th Academy Awards ceremony, hosted by Steve Martin, is held at Kodak Theatre in Hollywood. Rob Marshall's Chicago wins six awards out of 13 nominations, including Best Picture (the first musical to win the award since 1968's Oliver!). Roman Polanski wins Best Director for The Pianist, though he does not attend due to a long-standing arrest warrant. The telecast garners over 33 million viewers, making it the least-watched and lowest-rated televised Oscar ceremony so far.
- March 30
  - Meigs Field Airport in Chicago, Illinois, is demolished overnight.
  - World Wrestling Entertainment holds WrestleMania XIX at Safeco Field in Seattle, Washington, drawing a crowd of 54,097.

=== April ===
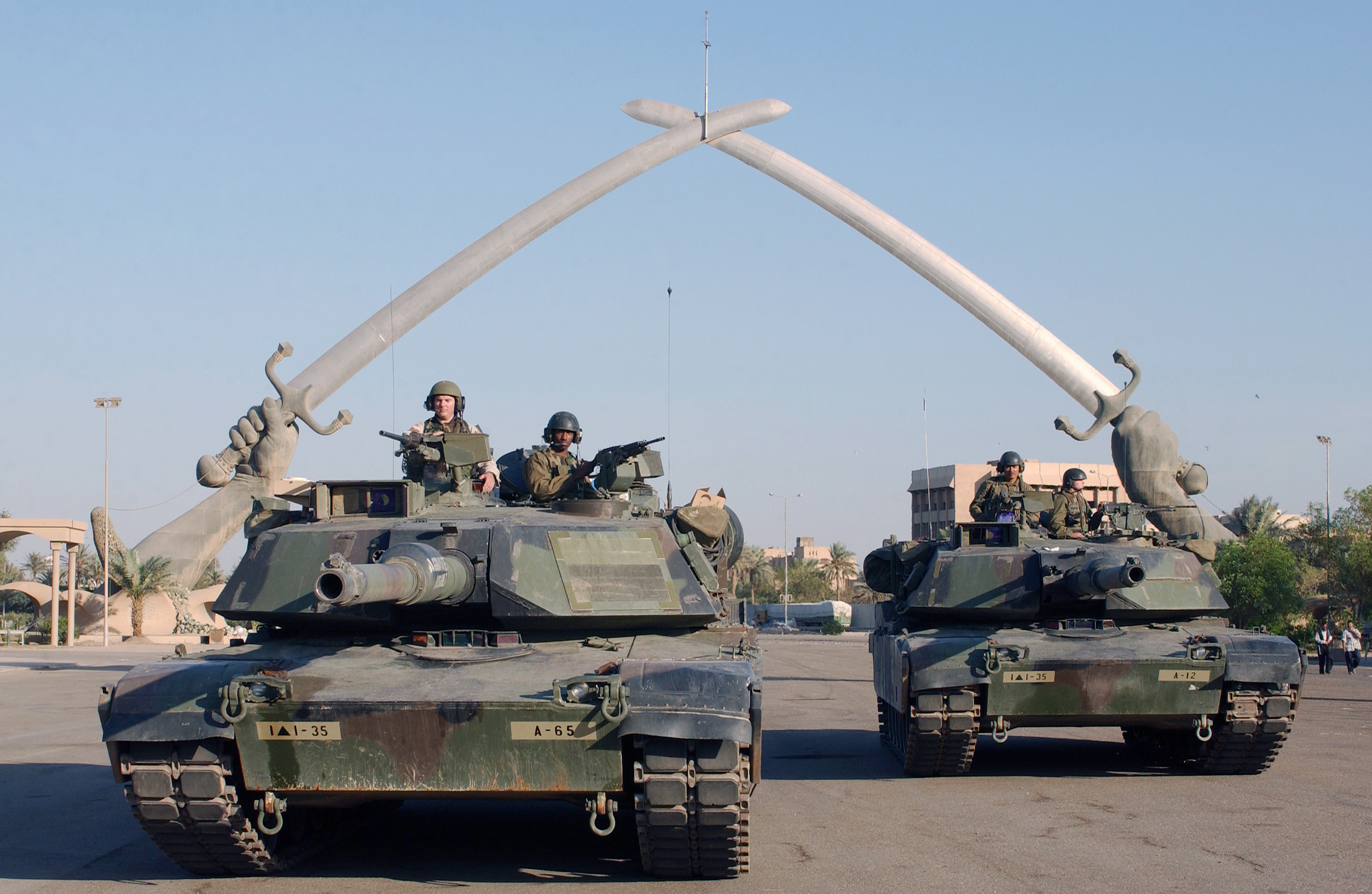
April 9: M1A1 Abrams pose for a photo under the "Hands of Victory" in Ceremony Square, Baghdad, Iraq.

- April 3 – U.S. forces seize control of Saddam International Airport, changing the airport's name to Baghdad International Airport.
- April 3–12 – Iraq War: US forces defeat the Iraqi Army and the Iraqi Republican Guard in the Battle of Baghdad.
- April 9 – Iraq War: U.S. forces seize control of Baghdad, ending the regime of Saddam Hussein.
- April 13
  - Iraq War: Saddam Hussein's hometown of Tikrit falls to U.S. forces.
  - President George W. Bush accuses Syria of possessing chemical weapons.
- April 18 – Holes, directed by Andrew Davis is released in theaters.
- April 21 – Retired U.S. Army General Jay Garner becomes Interim Civil Administrator of Iraq.
- April 27 – World Wrestling Entertainment holds its Backlash pay-per-view event from the Worcester Centrum in Worcester, Massachusetts.
- April 29 – Secretary of Defense Donald Rumsfeld confirms that U.S. troops will be withdrawn from Saudi Arabia where they have been stationed since the 1991 Gulf War.

=== May ===
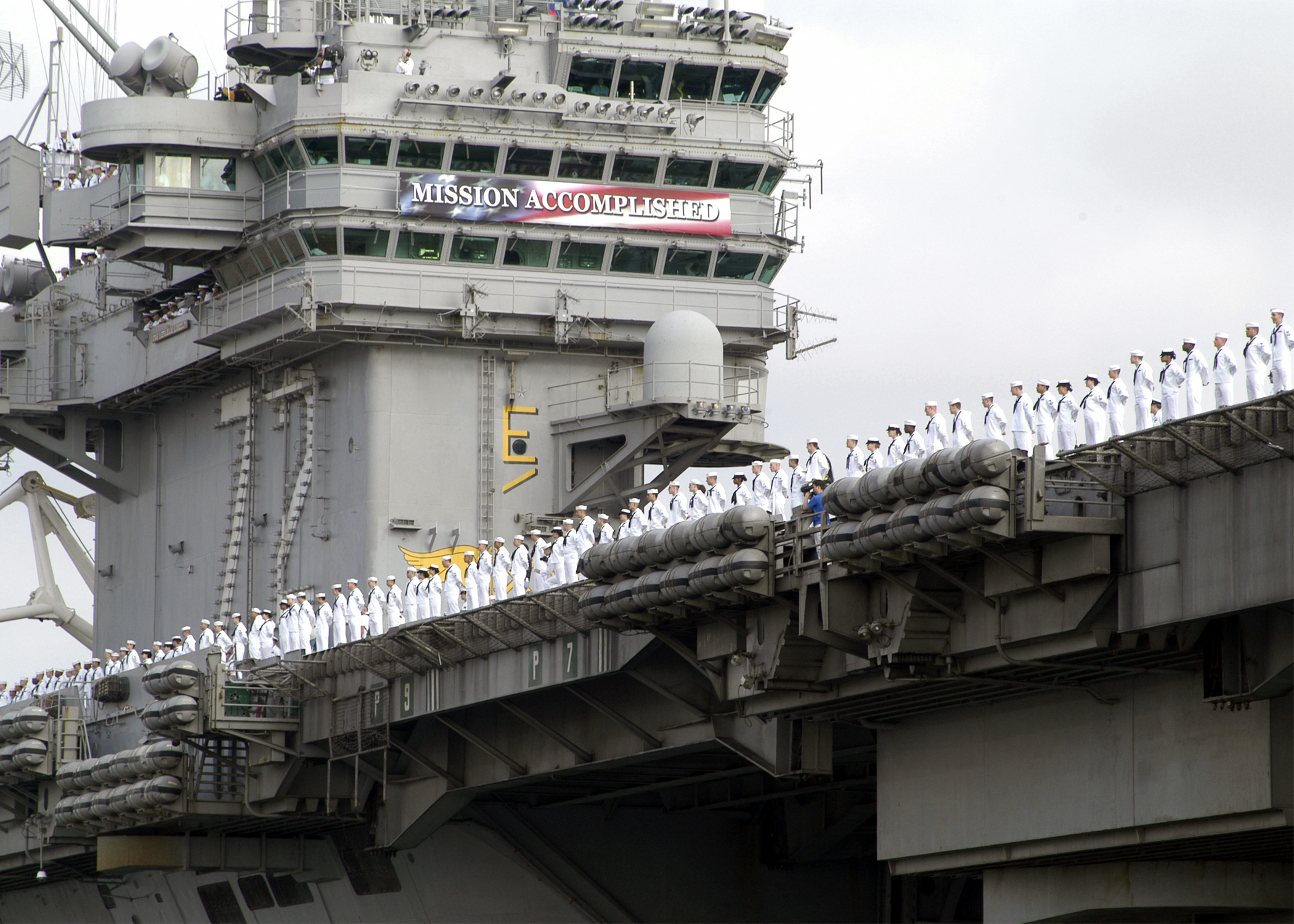
May 1: President George W. Bush's Mission Accomplished Speech

- May 1 – President George W. Bush lands on the aircraft carrier USS Abraham Lincoln, where he gives a speech announcing the end of major combat in the 2003 Invasion of Iraq. A banner behind him declares "Mission Accomplished".
- May 3 – The Old Man of the Mountain, a rock formation in New Hampshire, crumbles after heavy rain.
- May 4 – Top Thrill Dragster opens in Cedar Point in Sandusky, Ohio as the world's tallest, fastest roller coaster.
- May 4–10 – a Tornado outbreak sequence spawns more tornadoes than any week in U.S. history; over 300 tornadoes are reported in 19 states.
- May 18 – World Wrestling Entertainment holds its Judgment Day pay-per-view from the Charlotte Coliseum in Charlotte, North Carolina.
- May 21 – Ruben Studdard wins season 2 of American Idol.
- May 23 – Dewey, the first deer cloned by scientists at Texas A&M University, is born.
- May 25 – After docking in Miami at 05:00, the SS Norway (old SS France) is severely damaged by a boiler explosion at 06:30, killing seven and injuring 17 crew members. A few weeks later it is announced by Norwegian Cruise Line that she will never sail again as a commercial ocean liner.
- May 28 – US President George W. Bush authorizes $350 billion worth of tax cuts over 10 years (Jobs and Growth Tax Relief Reconciliation Act of 2003).
- May 30 – Finding Nemo, Pixar Animation Studios' fifth feature film, is released in theaters, becoming the studio's biggest financial success up to that point.
- May 31 – Eric Rudolph, perpetrator of the Centennial Olympic Park bombing in 1996, is captured in Murphy, North Carolina.

=== June ===
- June – As a result of the early 2000s recession, as well as the jobless recovery that followed, unemployment peaks at 6.3%, the highest since April 1994.
- June 4 – Martha Stewart and her broker are indicted for using privileged investment information and then obstructing a federal investigation. Stewart also resigns as chairperson and chief executive officer of Martha Stewart Living.
- June 14 – Ennis shooting: A gunman goes on a shooting spree in Madison County, Montana. The gunman kills one man and injures six others, before being involved in a chase and shootout with responding police. He is sentenced to 11 life terms, the longest prison sentence in Montana state history.
- June 15
  - The San Antonio Spurs win their second NBA Championship after defeating the New Jersey Nets, 88-77, in Game 6 of the 2003 NBA Finals.
  - World Wrestling Entertainment holds its Bad Blood pay-per-view event from the Compaq Center in Houston, Texas.
- June 19 – The U.S. Census Bureau announces that with 37 million, Hispanics constitute the largest minority in the USA (compared with 36 million African Americans).
- June 22 – The largest hailstone ever recorded falls in Aurora, Nebraska.
- June 23 – Grutter v. Bollinger: The Supreme Court of the United States upholds affirmative action in university admissions.
- June 26
  - A senior Department of State chemical and biological weapons expert testifies to the House of Representatives Intelligence Committee that he was pressured to modify intelligence reports about Iraq.
  - Lawrence v. Texas: The U.S. Supreme Court declares sodomy laws unconstitutional.
- June 29 – A balcony collapse in Chicago kills 13.
- June 30 – In Irvine, California, Joseph Hunter Parker kills two Albertsons employees with a sword, before being shot to death by the police.

=== July ===
- July 1 – Tesla Inc., the American electric car company, is founded by Martin Eberhard and Marc Tarpenning in San Carlos, California.
- July 8 – Douglas Williams goes on a shooting rampage in a Lockheed Martin plant in Meridian, Mississippi, killing six and injuring eight before committing suicide.
- July 9 – Pirates of the Caribbean: The Curse of the Black Pearl, directed by Gore Verbinski, is released in theaters as the first film in the Pirates of the Caribbean film Series.
- July 14 – CIA leak scandal: The Washington Post columnist Robert Novak publishes the name of Valerie Plame, blowing her cover as a CIA operative.
- July 22 – Uday and Qusay Hussein, sons of Saddam Hussein, are killed by the U.S. military in Iraq, after being tipped off by an informant.
- July 26 – The electorate of the Cherokee Nation of Oklahoma approves a new constitution re-designating the tribe "Cherokee Nation" without "of Oklahoma" and specifically disenfranchising the Cherokee Freedmen.
- July 27 – World Wrestling Entertainment holds its Vengeance pay-per-view event from the Pepsi Center in Denver, Colorado.

=== August ===
- August 1
  - The social network Myspace launches.
  - My Life as a Teenage Robot premieres on Nickelodeon.
- August 14 – A widespread power outage affects the northeastern United States and South-Central Canada.
- August 19 – Taylor Swift and Martina McBride with RCA record label RCA Records and RCA Nashville.
- August 24 – World Wrestling Entertainment holds its SummerSlam pay-per-view event from the America West Arena in Phoenix, Arizona.
- August 25 – The Spitzer Space Telescope was launched from Cape Canaveral, Florida, during Delta II.
- August 28 – Brian Douglas Wells, a pizza delivery man in Erie, Pennsylvania, is killed after a bomb fastened around his neck explodes. Wells was forced to rob a bank with the bomb collar on before it was detonated remotely.

=== September ===
- September 7 – President Bush announces a request for $87 billion from Congress for military operations in Afghanistan and Iraq.
- September 17 – President Bush concedes there is no evidence linking Iraqi President Saddam Hussein to the September 11, 2001 attacks.
- September 18 – Hurricane Isabel makes landfall as a Category 2 Hurricane on North Carolina's Outer Banks. It directly kills 16 people in the Mid–Atlantic area.
- September 21 – World Wrestling Entertainment holds its Unforgiven pay-per-view event from the Giant Center in Hershey, Pennsylvania.

=== October ===
- October 7 – 2003 California gubernatorial recall election: Voters recall Governor Gray Davis from office and elect actor Arnold Schwarzenegger to succeed him.
- October 9 – A redesigned $20 bill is first released, containing many new security features not found in older bills.
- October 10 – Facing an investigation surrounding allegations of illegal drug use, American right-wing radio host Rush Limbaugh publicly admits that he is addicted to prescription pain killers, and will seek treatment.
- October 15 – The 2003 Staten Island Ferry crash kills 11 after one of its ferries slams into a pier.
- October 19 – World Wrestling Entertainment holds its No Mercy pay-per-view event from the 1st Mariner Arena in Baltimore, Maryland.
- October 25
  - The Florida Marlins defeat the New York Yankees in six games in the 2003 World Series to win their second World Series title.
  - The Cedar Fire begins in San Diego County, burning 280,000 acres (1,100 km^{2}), 2,232 homes and killing 14.

=== November ===
- November 1 – Walt Disney Pictures' 44th feature film, Brother Bear, is released to box office success but mixed-to-negative critical reception.
- November 7 – Elf, directed by Jon Favreau, is released in theaters.
- November 16 – World Wrestling Entertainment holds its Survivor Series pay-per-view event from the American Airlines Center in Dallas, Texas.
- November 18
  - The Massachusetts Supreme Judicial Court, in Goodridge v. Department of Public Health, rules anti-gay laws against same-sex marriage unconstitutional in Massachusetts.
  - U.S. President George W. Bush makes a state visit to London in the midst of massive anti-war protests.
- November 20
  - Iraq War: End of Operation Iron Hammer, an attempt to end the Iraq insurgency.
  - Michael Jackson is arrested on charges of child molestation. The singer faced similar charges in 1993 that were dropped after an out-of-court financial settlement was reached with the family of a boy. In light of the new accusations, the television network CBS chooses to pull the scheduled November 26 airing of a one-hour television special intended to promote Jackson's new greatest hits album, Number Ones.

=== December ===
- December 1 – Boeing chairman and CEO Phil Condit resigns unexpectedly. He is replaced by Lewis Platt as non-executive chairman and Harry Stonecipher as president and CEO.
- December 13 – Iraq War: End of Operation Red Dawn, resulting in the capture of Saddam Hussein in Tikrit.
- December 14 – World Wrestling Entertainment holds its Armageddon pay-per-view event from the TD Waterhouse Centre in Orlando, Florida.
- December 22 – The 6.6 M_{w} San Simeon earthquake shook the central coast of California with a maximum Mercalli intensity of VIII (Severe), leaving two dead and 40 injured, and causing $250–300 million in damage.
- December 24
  - At the request of the U.S. Embassy in Paris, the Government of France orders Air France to cancel several flights between France and the U.S. in response to terrorism concerns.
  - A BSE (mad cow disease) outbreak in Washington state is announced. Several countries including Brazil, Australia, and Taiwan ban the import of beef from the United States.
- December 31 – British Airways Flight 223, a Boeing 747-400 flying from London Heathrow to Washington Dulles, is held for security checks after landing due to intelligence suggesting a terrorist threat.

=== Ongoing ===
- Iraqi no-fly zones (1991–2003)
- War in Afghanistan (2001–2021)
- Iraq War (2003–2011)

== Births ==
=== January ===
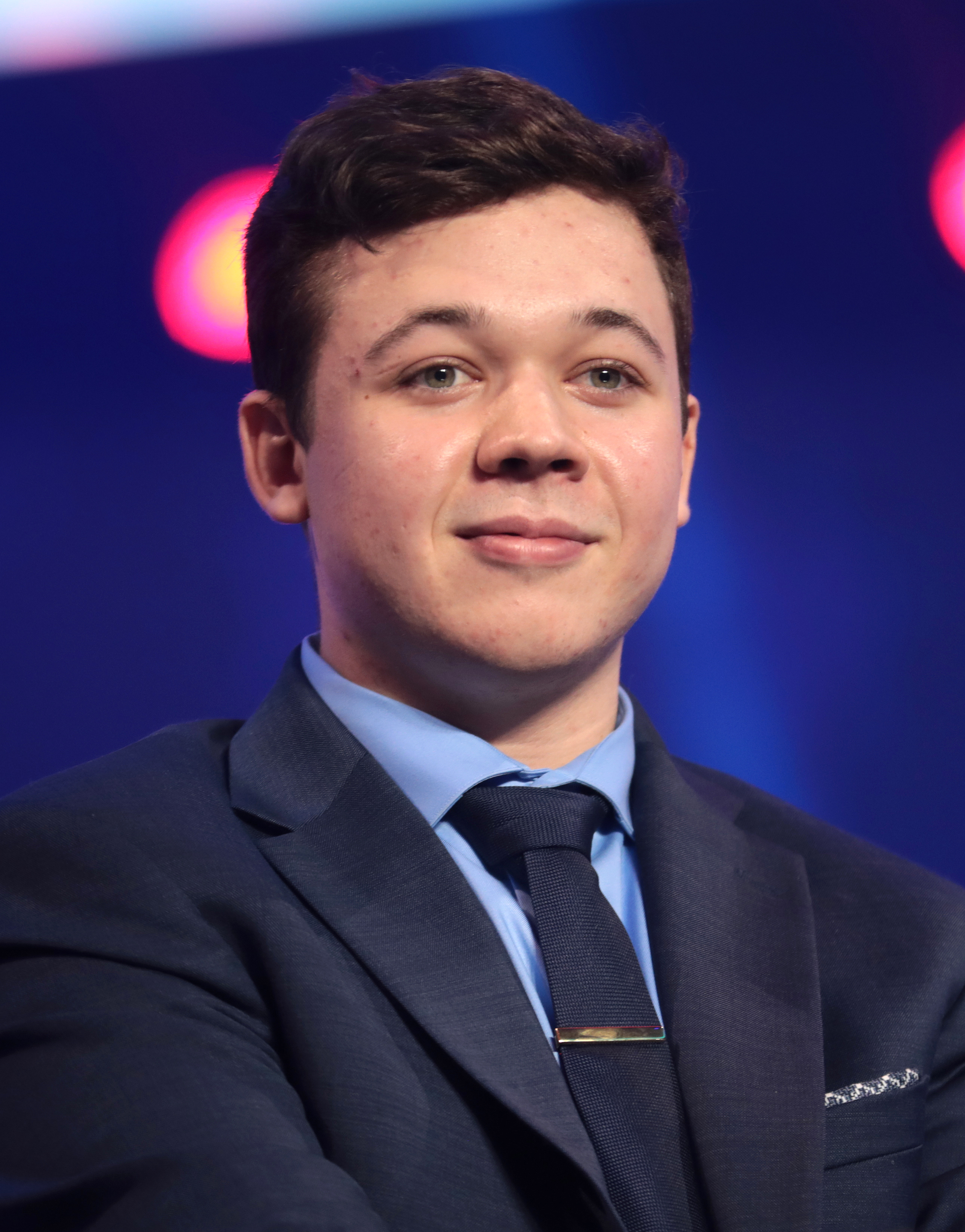
Kyle Rittenhouse

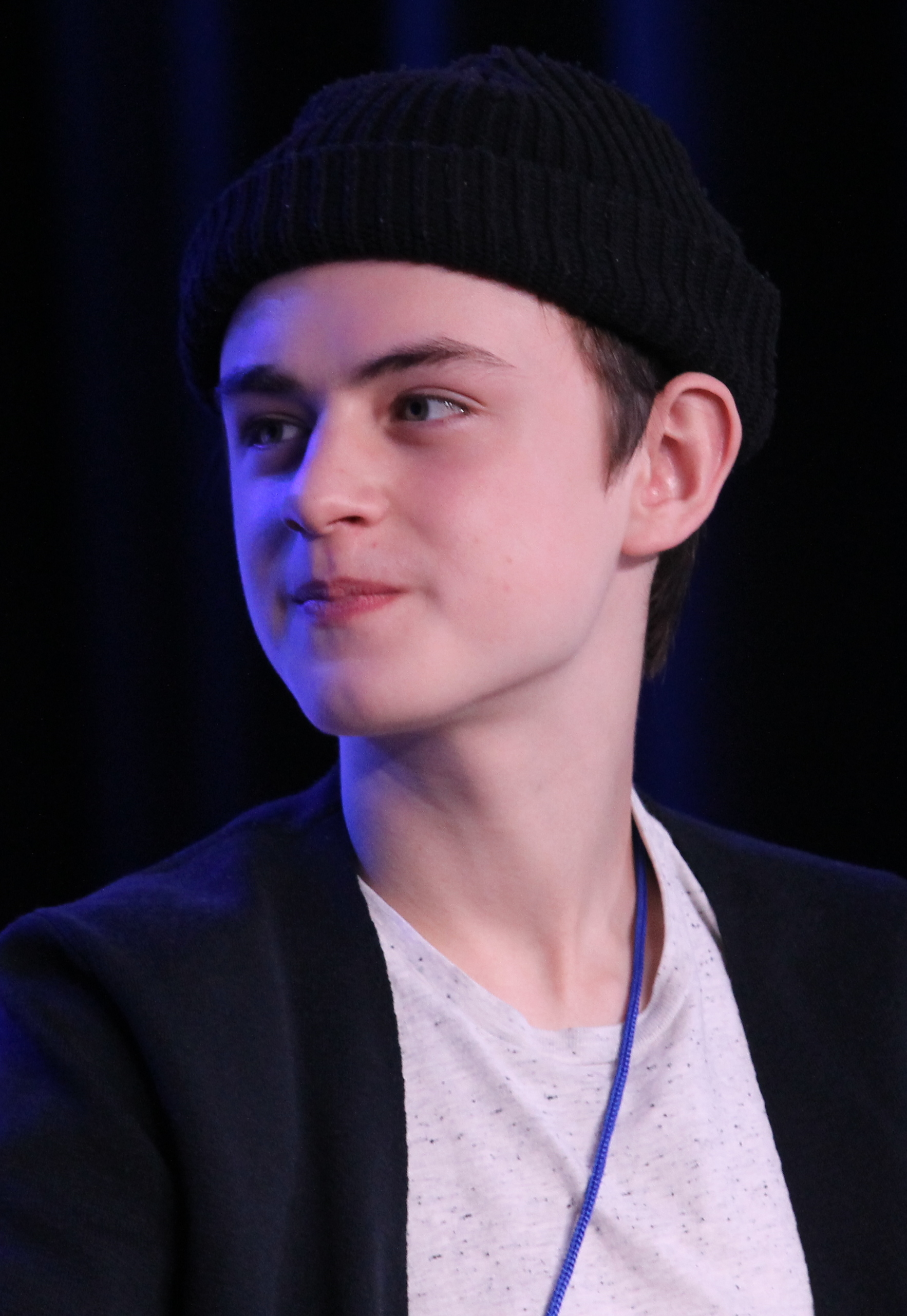
Jaeden Martell

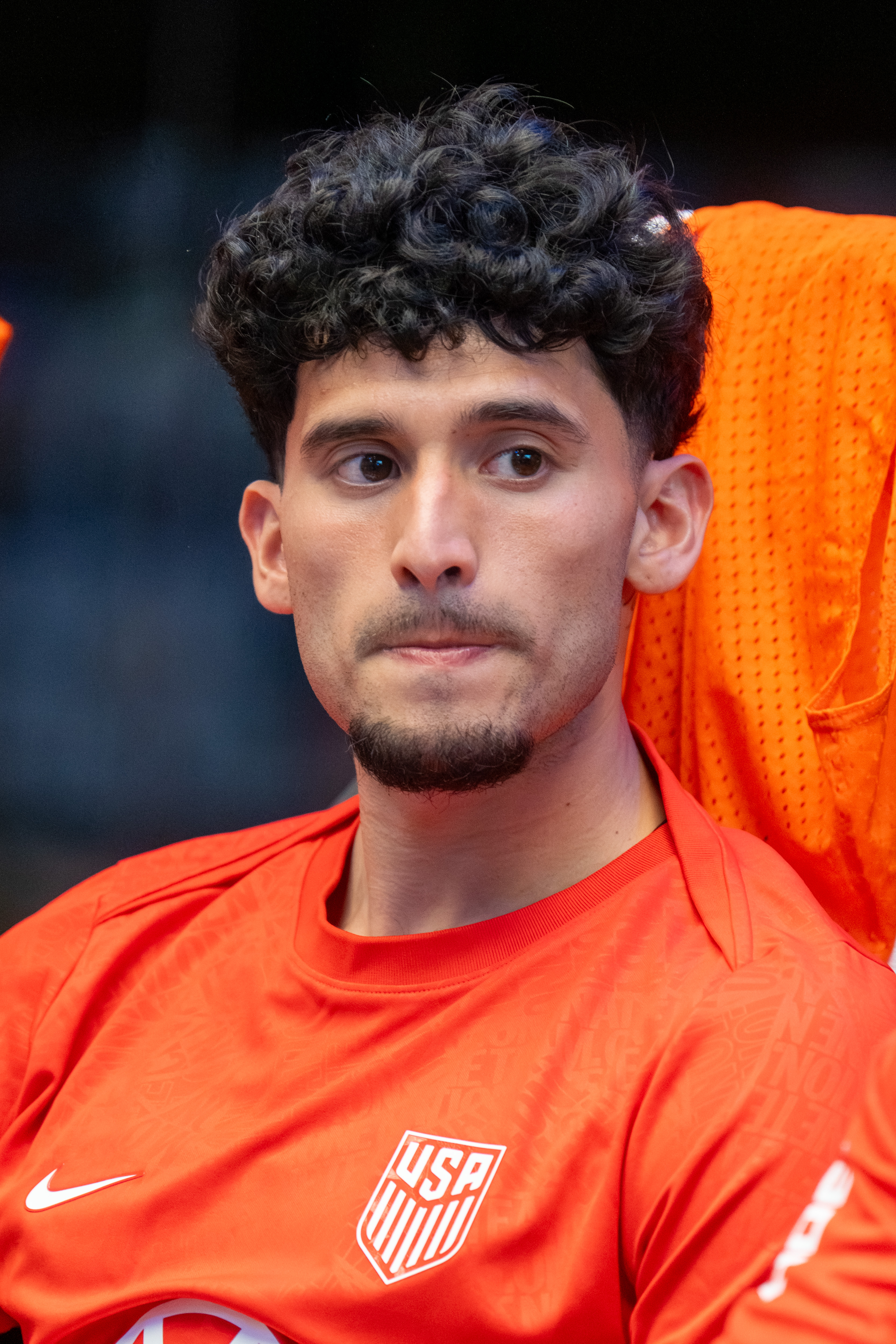
Ricardo Pepi

- January 1 – Nikhil Kumar, table tennis player
- January 2 – Cyrus Arnold, actor
- January 3
  - Mitchell Budler, soccer player
  - Kyle Rittenhouse, defendant acquitted of the Kenosha unrest shooting
  - Joseph Zalinsky, soccer player
- January 4
  - Aleah Finnegan, gymnast
  - Jaeden Martell, actor
- January 6 – MattyBRaps, singer/songwriter, rapper, and dancer
- January 7 – Abel Mendoza, soccer player
- January 8 – Taylor Thierry, basketball player
- January 9
  - Tyler Freeman, soccer player
  - Graham Ivan Clark, cybercriminal
  - Ricardo Pepi, soccer player
- January 11 – Sota Kitahara, soccer player
- January 13
  - Christopher Garcia, soccer player
  - Toby Kodat, tennis player
  - Roald Mitchell, soccer player
  - Reece Ushijima, Japanese-American racing driver
- January 14 – Brittain Gottlieb, soccer player
- January 16
  - Tyler Boucher, hockey player
  - Diana Davis, American-born Russian ice dancer
- January 18
  - Jonathan Perez, soccer player
  - Rayna Vallandingham, actress
- January 19 – Katherine Valli, para badminton player
- January 20 – J. J. McCarthy, football player
- January 21 – Garren Stitt, actor and singer
- January 22 – Michael Halliday, soccer player
- January 23
  - Adrián González, soccer player
  - Selmir Miscic, soccer player
- January 27
  - Cooper Kinney, baseball player
  - Gabriella Marte, American-born Dominican footballer
  - Paul Son, soccer player
- January 28 – Carson Hocevar, dirt track and stock car racing driver

=== February ===
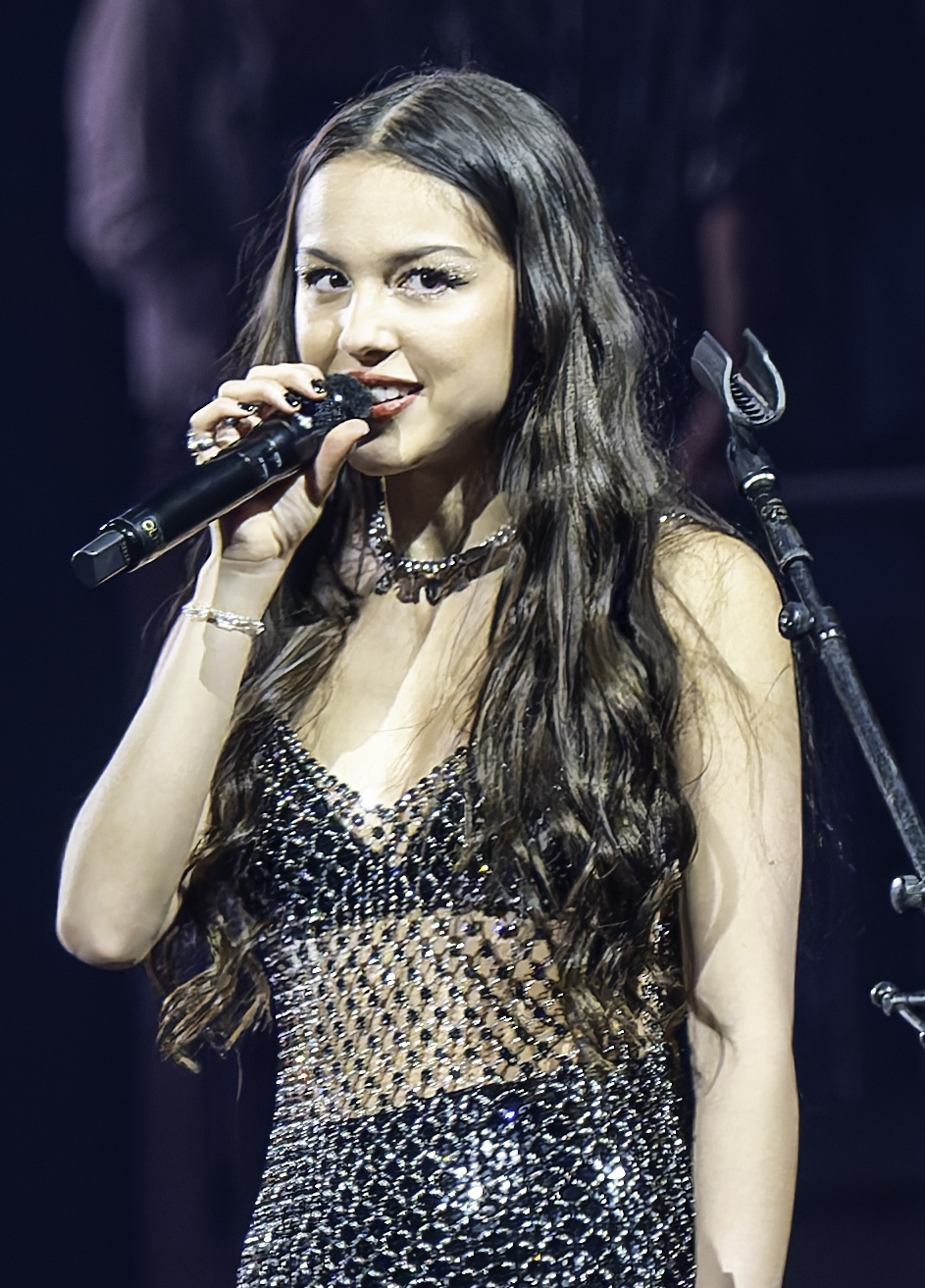
Olivia Rodrigo

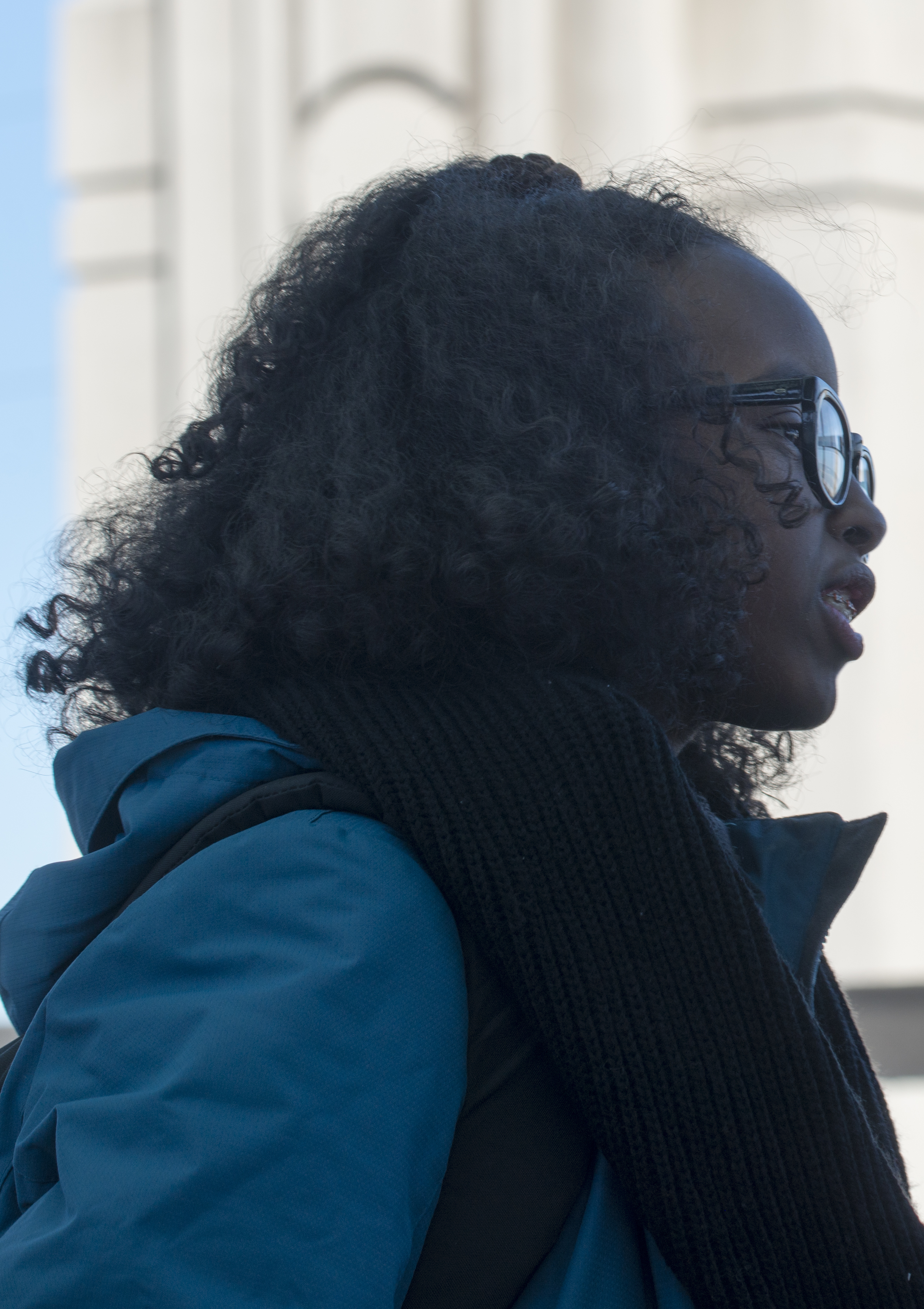
Isra Hirsi

- February 1 – Sydney Mikayla, actress
- February 2 – Dusty Henricksen, freestyle snowboarder
- February 4 – Kyla Kenedy, actress
- February 10
  - Max Christie, basketball player
  - Mauricio Cuevas, soccer player
- February 13 – Tyler Wolff, Filipino soccer player
- February 15 – Tamari Davis, sprinter
- February 16
  - Matthew Edwards, soccer player
  - Kayden Pierre, soccer player
- February 20
  - Kristina García, American-born Dominican footballer
  - Olivia Rodrigo, singer and actress
- February 21
  - Harry Ford, baseball player
  - Samantha Gordon, football and soccer player
- February 22
  - Isra Hirsi, climate activist and daughter of U.S. Congresswoman Ilhan Omar
  - Yuven Sundaramoorthy, racing driver
- February 25
- February 26 – Ethan Hardin, soccer player
- February 28 – Hope Rose, indoor and field hockey player

=== March ===
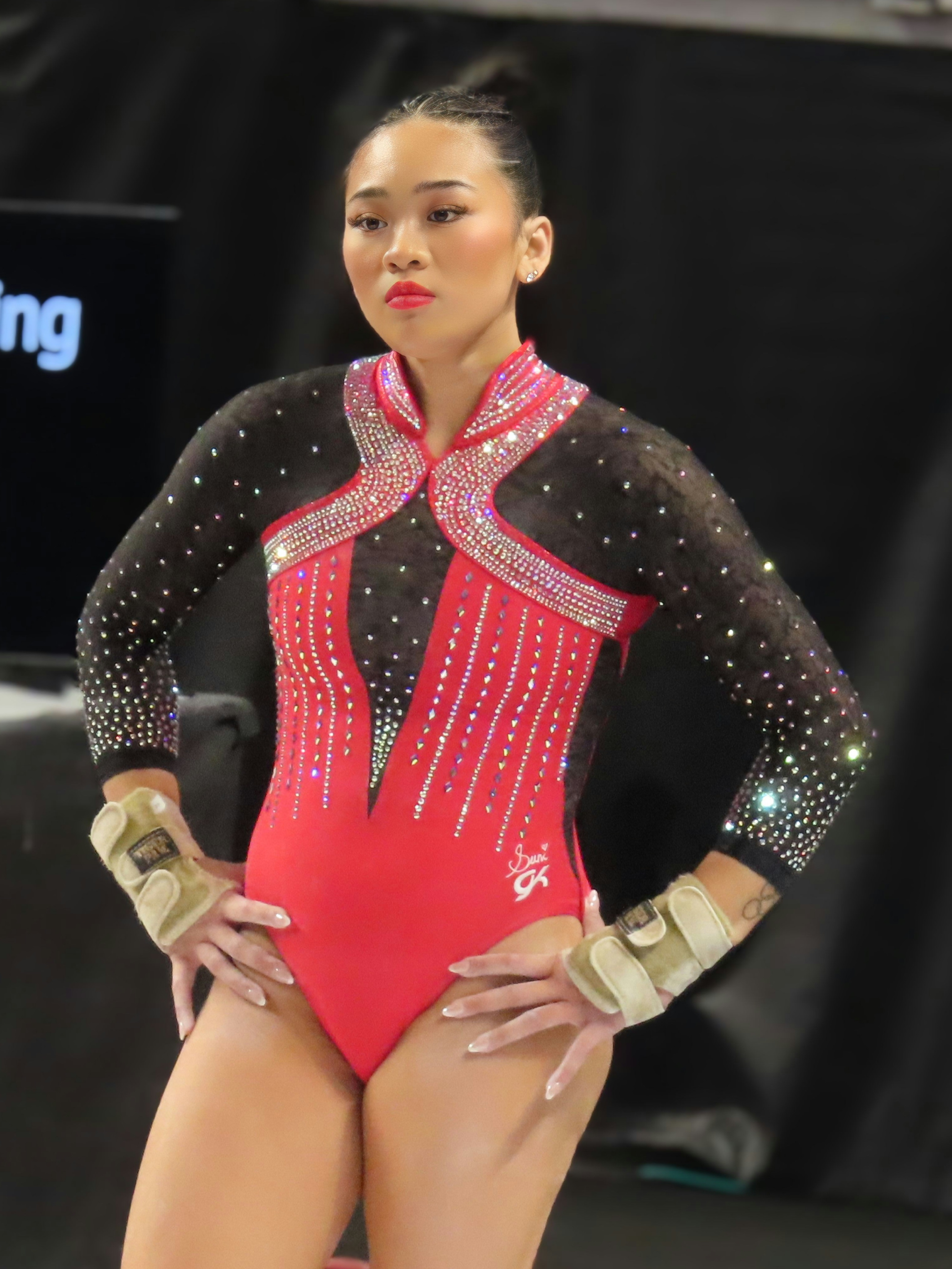
Sunisa Lee

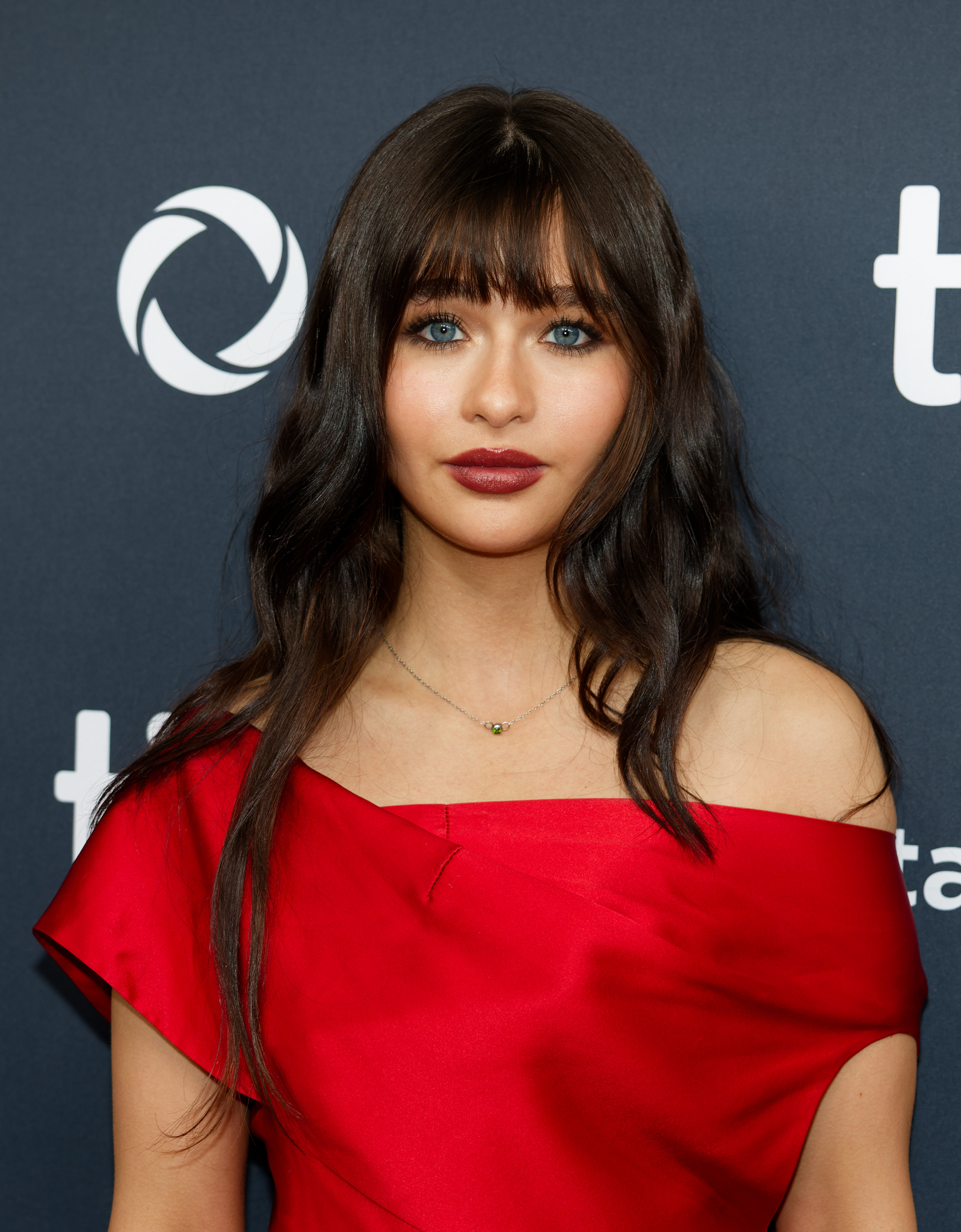
Malina Weissman

- March 1
  - Yasmeen Fletcher, actress
- March 6
  - Walter Clayton Jr., college basketball player
  - Millicent Simmonds, actress
- March 8
  - Montana Jordan, actor
  - Gavin Krenecki, soccer player
  - Ethan Peters, beauty blogger, makeup artist, and social media personality (d. 2020)
- March 9
  - Sunisa Lee, gymnast
- March 10
  - Sebastian Nava, soccer player
  - Gabriella Pizzolo, actress and singer
  - Elijah Wynder, soccer player
- March 11 – Mikaela Jenkins, Paralympic swimmer
- March 12
  - Ashley Lin, Chinese-American figure skater
  - Malina Weissman, actress and model
- March 15 – Quinn Ewers, football player
- March 19 – Chase Stillman, American-born Canadian ice hockey player
- March 20 – Alex Monis, soccer player
- March 23 – Jacob Greene, soccer player
- March 26 – Bhad Bhabie, rapper, songwriter, and internet personality
- March 27 – Grant Hampton, soccer player

=== April ===
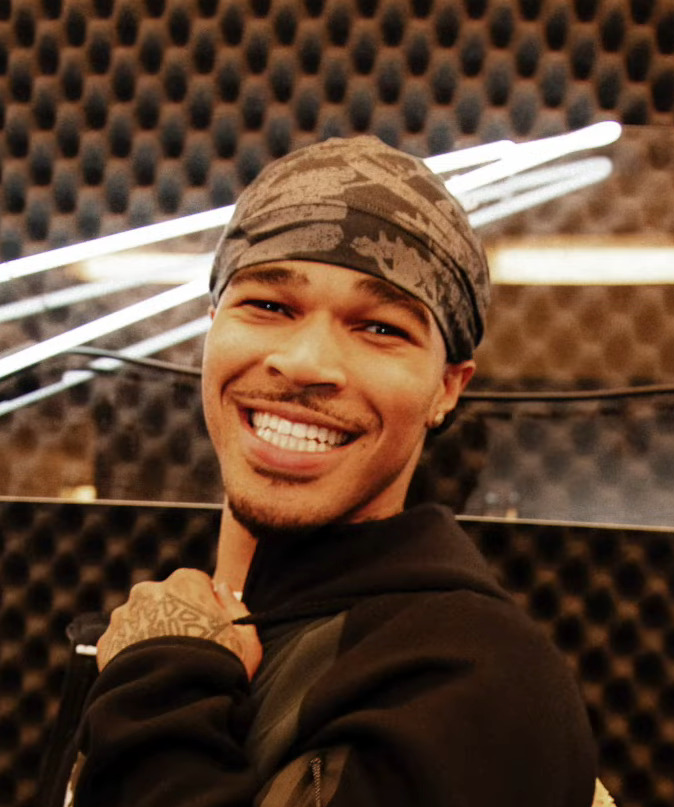
PlaqueBoyMax

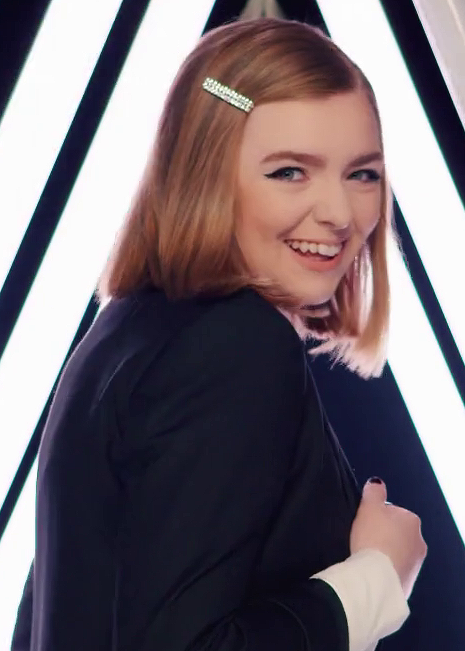
Elsie Fisher

- April 1 – Jeremy Garay, soccer player
- April 3
  - PlaqueBoyMax, streamer and rapper
  - Elsie Fisher, actress
- April 4
  - Caio Lauxtermann, gymnast
  - Chase Petty, baseball player
- April 5
  - Jordan Bowers, gymnast
- April 9
  - Awonder Liang, chess prodigy
  - Hayley Faith Negrin, actress
- April 10 – Andrew Painter, baseball player
- April 11 – Blake Pope, soccer player
- April 12 – Omar Salim, American-born Hungarian taekwondo athlete
- April 14 – Saylor Poffenbarger, basketball player
- April 16
  - Brynn Cartelli, singer
  - Kahlil Watson, baseball player
- April 17 – Dante Sealy, soccer player
- April 19
  - Caleel Harris, child actor and voice actor
  - Jackson Merrill, baseball player
- April 23 – Griffin Dillon, soccer player
- April 28 – Daniel Edelman, soccer player
- April 29

=== May ===
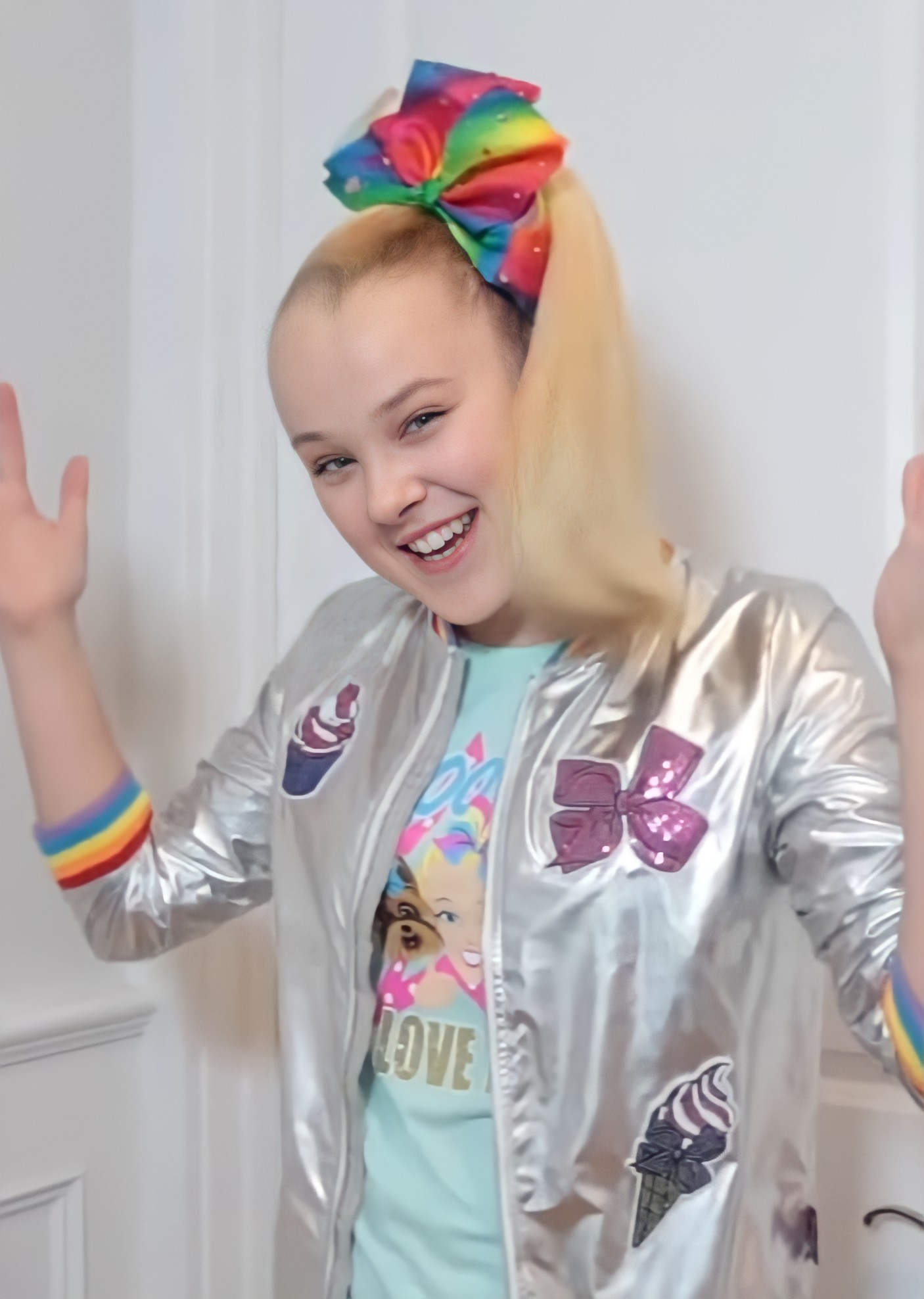
JoJo Siwa

- May 1 – Lizzy Greene, actress
- May 2 – Chaz Lucius, ice hockey player
- May 5 – Danny Leyva, soccer player
- May 7 – Kevin Paredes, soccer player
- May 8 – Logan Edra, breakdancer
- May 10
  - Marcus Ferkranus, soccer player
  - Gavin George, classical pianist
- May 11
  - Kendall Brown, basketball player
  - Daniel Flores, soccer player
- May 13
  - Jaxson Dart, football player
  - Jabari Smith Jr., basketball player
- May 14 – Javier Casas, soccer player
- May 15 – Max Kaeser, race car driver
- May 16
  - Annie Flood, Paralympic volleyball player
  - Cole Sillinger, American-born Canadian ice hockey player
  - Bryan Okoh, American-born Swiss professional footballer
- May 18 – Travis Hunter, American football player
- May 19 – JoJo Siwa, dancer, singer, actress, and YouTube personality
- May 20 – OsamaSon, rapper
- May 21
  - Erwin Martínez, soccer player
  - Parker Retzlaff, stock car racing driver
- May 24
  - Rose Zhang, golfer
- May 27 – Caden Clark, soccer player

=== June ===
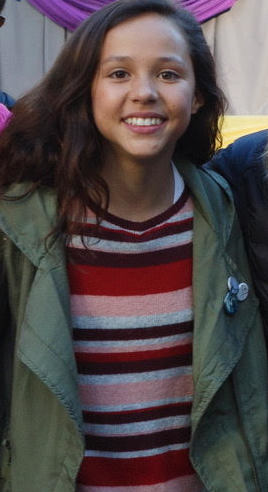
Breanna Yde

- June 1 – Emjay Anthony, actor and model
- June 2 – Jeremy Ray Taylor, actor
- June 3 – Nathan Bittle, basketball player
- June 4 – Brady House, baseball player
- June 10 – Lauren Hogg, activist
- June 11 – Breanna Yde, actress
- June 17
  - Brian Gutiérrez, soccer player
  - Elizabeth Yeager, indoor and field hockey player
- June 19 – Frank Mozzicato, baseball player
- June 20
  - Payton Gendron, convicted mass murderer
  - Hans Niemann, chess grandmaster
- June 21 – Issa Mudashiru, soccer player
- June 23
  - Cole Dewhurst, soccer player
  - Kaden Honeycutt, stock car racing driver
- June 24 – Marcus Fiesel, murder victim (d. 2006)
- June 25 – Carson Williams, baseball player
- June 26 – Sam Mayer, stock car racing driver
- June 28 – Joshua Báez, baseball player
- June 29 – Alexys Nycole Sanchez, child actress

=== July ===
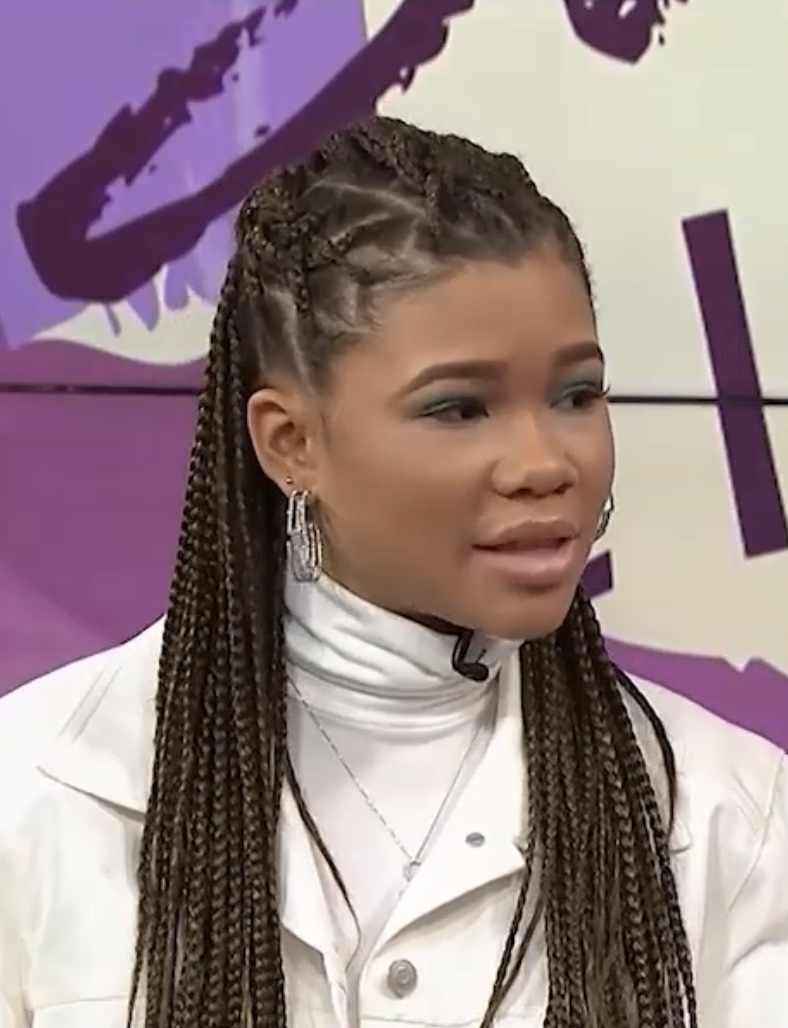
Storm Reid

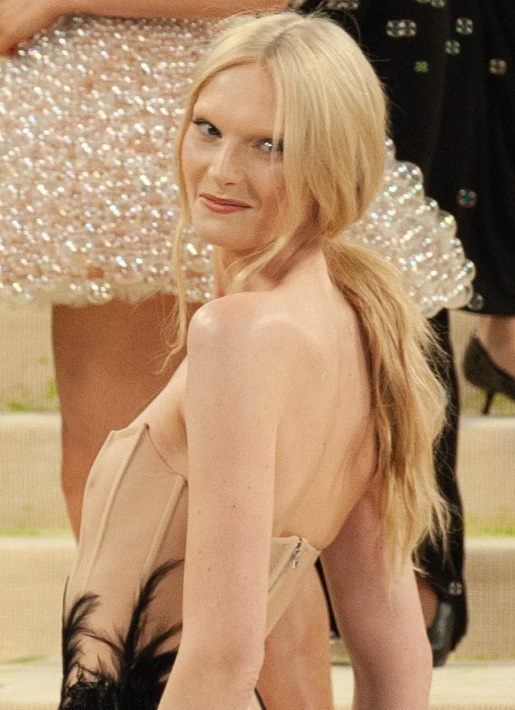
Alex Consani

- July 1
  - Storm Reid, actress
  - Brynn Rumfallo, reality television cast member and dancer
- July 5 – Terrell Ransom Jr., actor
- July 7 – Jack McGlynn, soccer player
- July 8 – Major Dodson, actor
- July 11 – Sydney Lucas, child actress
- July 12 – Jax Malcolm, actor
- July 13 – Wyatt Oleff, actor
- July 15 – Taylor Richardson, activist
- July 19
  - Tyler Downs, Olympic diver and social media personality
  - Jacob Steinmetz, baseball player
- July 21 – Marvin Gamez, soccer player
- July 23
  - Alex Consani, model and actress
  - Raegan Beers, basketball player
- July 29 – Alejandro Alvarado Jr., soccer player

=== August ===
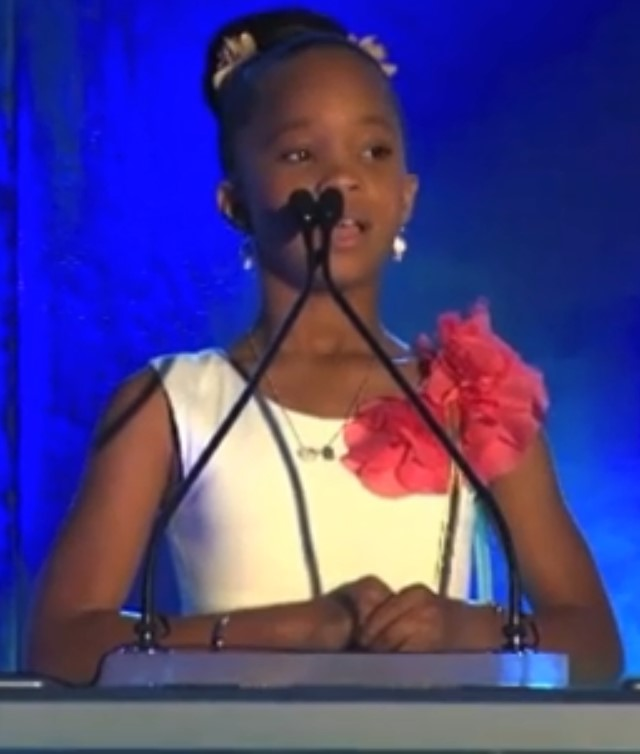
Quvenzhané Wallis

- August 5 – Arquimides Ordonez, soccer player
- August 6 – Brandon Huntley-Hatfield, basketball player
- August 8 – Adam Lundegard, soccer player
- August 10 – Joshua Saavedra, soccer player
- August 14 – Tega Ikoba, soccer player
- August 15 – Coby Jones, soccer player
- August 18
  - Max Charles, actor
  - Hailey Owens, murder victim (d. 2014)
- August 22 – Christian Nydegger, soccer player
- August 24
  - Jalen Neal, soccer player
  - Andre Zuluaga, soccer player
- August 25 – AJ Griffin, basketball player
- August 26
  - Paxten Aaronson, soccer player
  - Trevor Keels, basketball player
  - Emma Rayne Lyle, actress
- August 28
  - Lexi Underwood, actress
  - Quvenzhané Wallis, actress

=== September ===
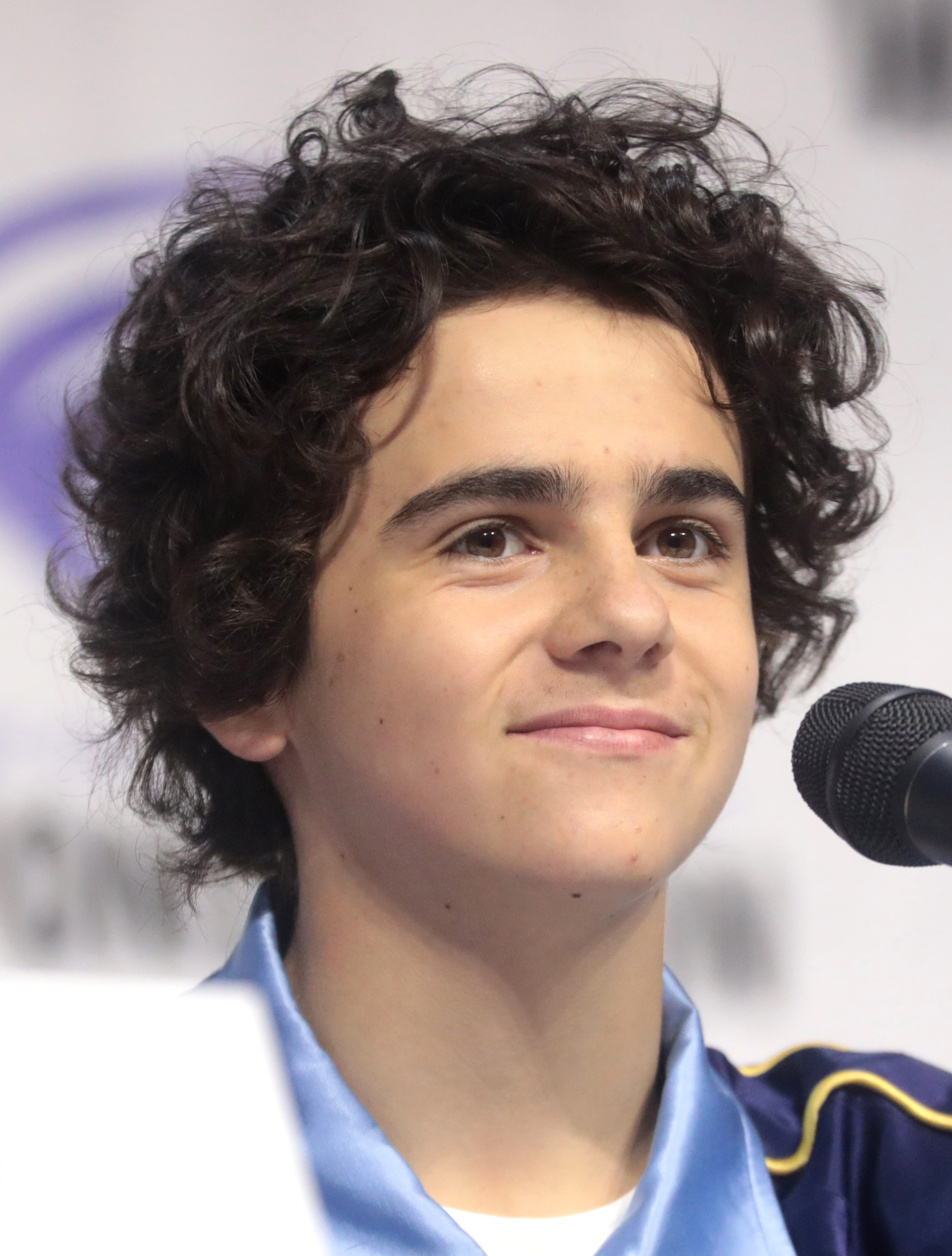
Jack Dylan Grazer

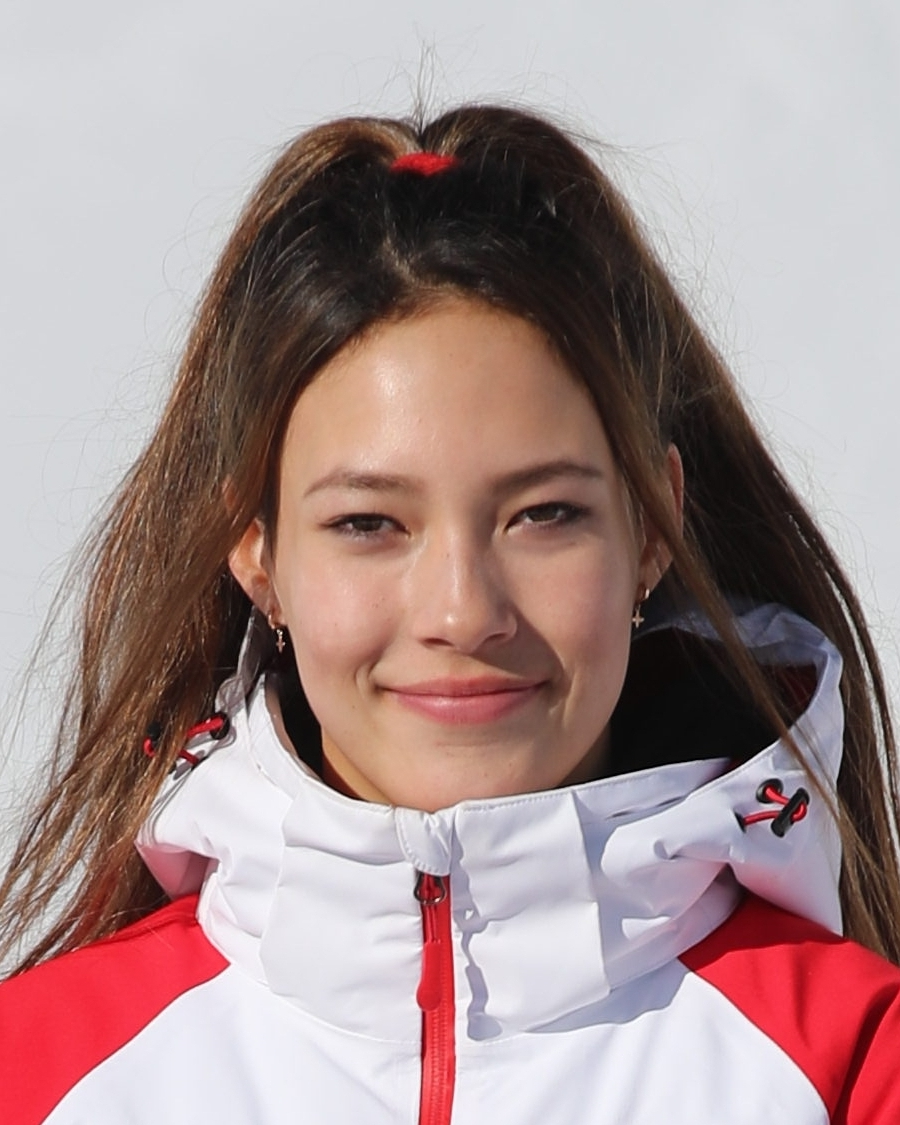
Eileen Gu

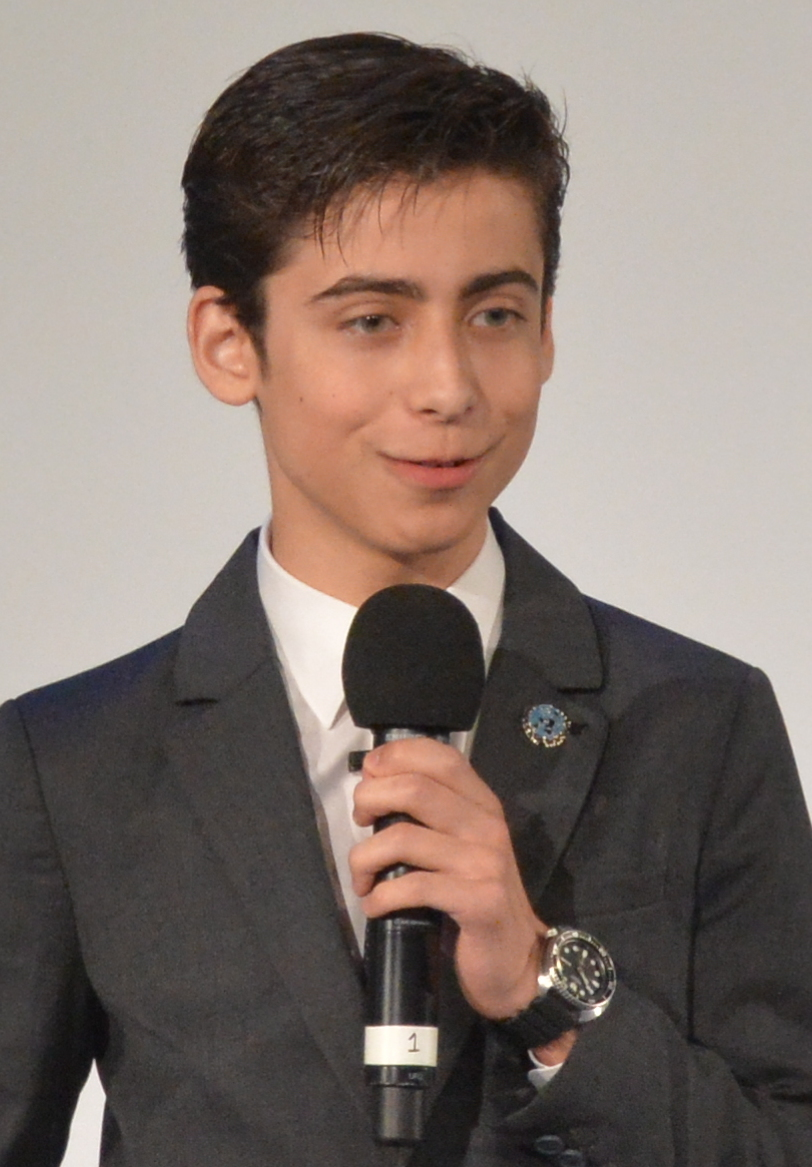
Aidan Gallagher

- September 1 – Jonathan Gómez, soccer player
- September 2 – Cristian Nava, soccer player
- September 3
  - Jack Dylan Grazer, actor
  - Eileen Gu, Chinese-American freestyle skier
- September 7 – Diego Luna, soccer player
- September 8
  - Nicolas Cantu, actor
- September 9 – Luke Hughes, ice hockey player
- September 10 – Carissa Yip, chess player
- September 14 – Lateef Omidiji, soccer player
- September 18 – Aidan Gallagher, actor
- September 20 – Thomas Matthew Crooks, attempted assassin of Donald Trump (d. 2024)
- September 26 – Hanna Harrell, figure skater
- September 28 – Caden Stafford, soccer player
- September 30 – Martin Damm, tennis player

=== October ===
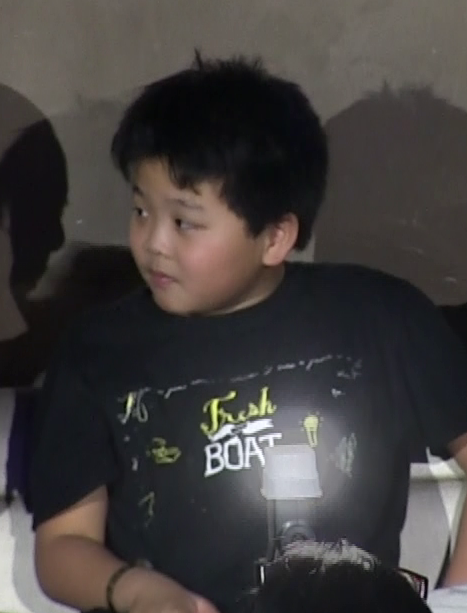
Hudson Yang

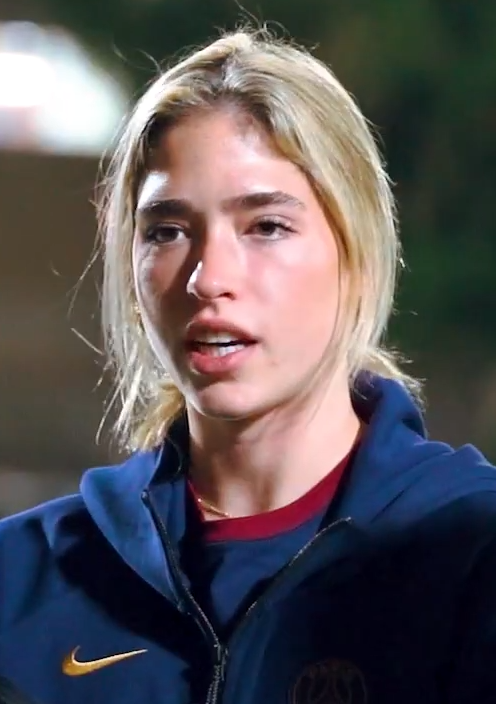
Korbin Shrader

- October 3 – Caroline Green, ice dancer
- October 8
  - Ángela Aguilar, Mexican-American singer
  - Jack Doherty, internet personality
- October 12 – Michael Lenis, soccer player
- October 13 – Korbin Shrader, American soccer player
- October 14
  - Cade Cowell, soccer player
- October 15 – Chris Livingston, basketball player
- October 20 – Sophia Gennusa, child actress
- October 24 – Hudson Yang, actor
- October 25 – Tegan Marie, country singer and songwriter
- October 27 – Gavin Lewis, actor
- October 31 – Gerardo Dúran, soccer player

=== November ===
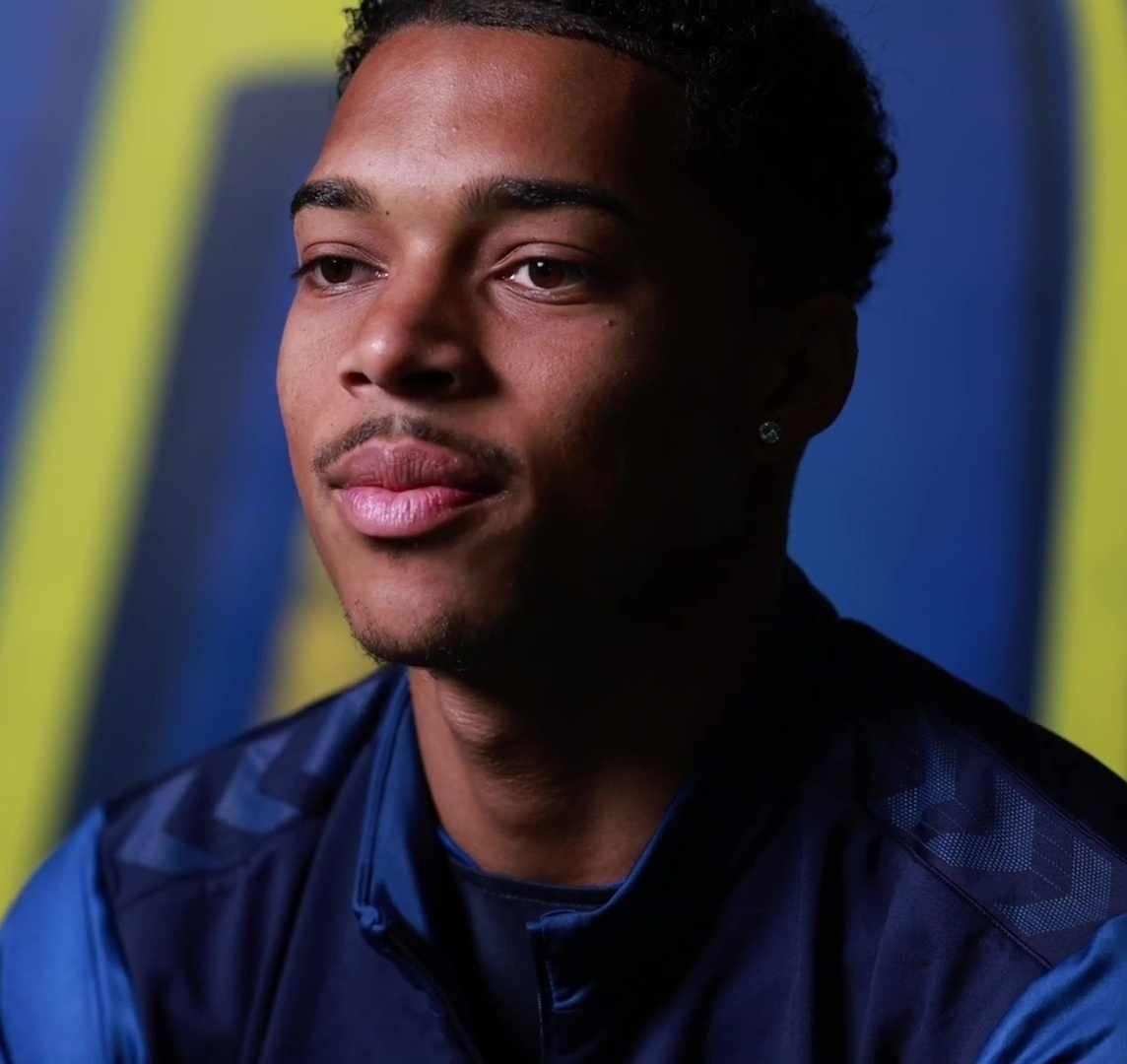
Justin Che

- November 10 – Marissa Reyes, actress
- November 12 – Jett Noland, racing driver
- November 14 – Brandon Jacobson, chess grandmaster
- November 18 – Justin Che, soccer player
- November 21 – Ellie Stokes, American-born Saint Kitts and Nevis footballer
- November 26 – Shay Ciezki, basketball player

=== December ===
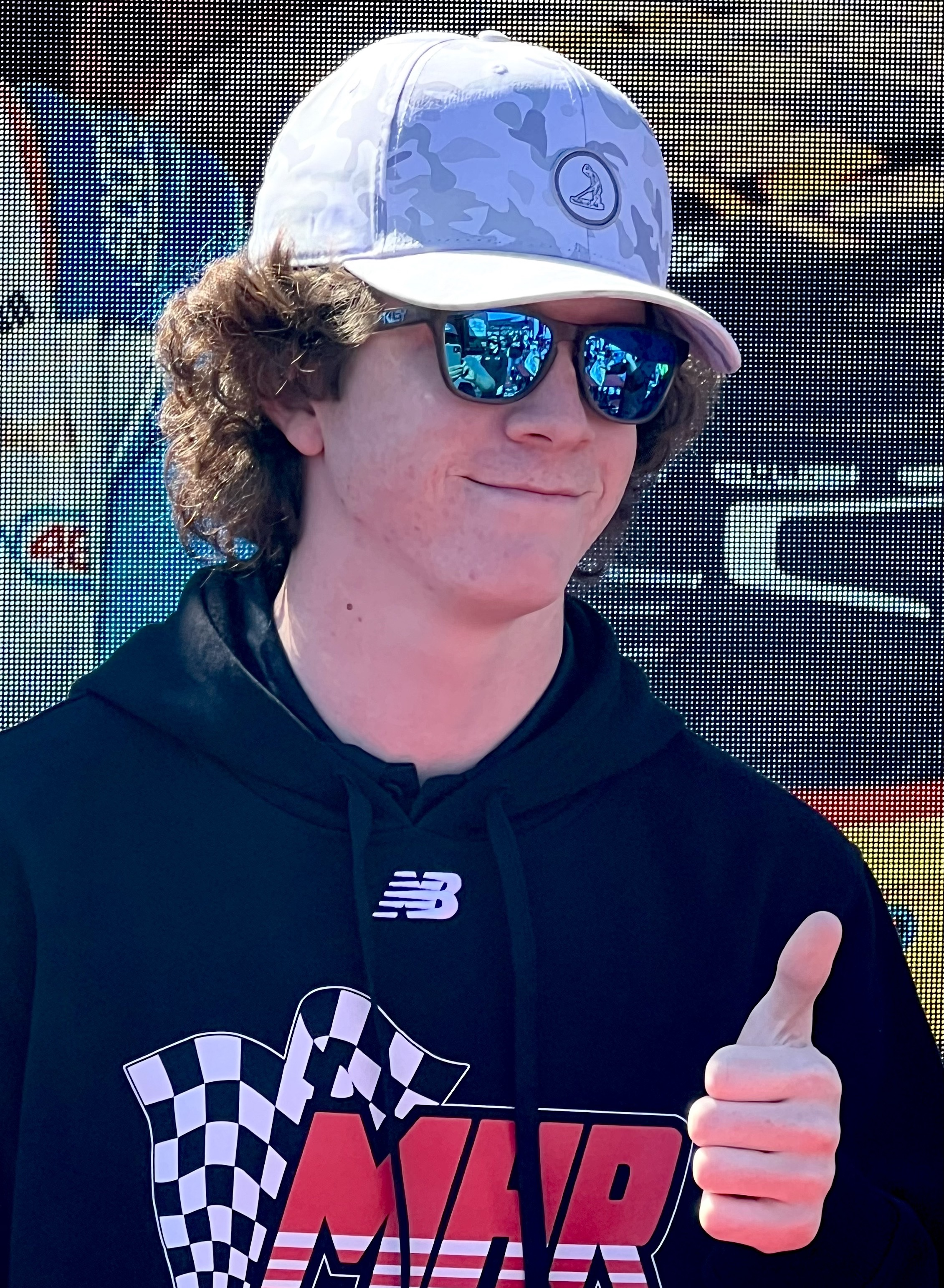
Daniel Dye

- December 1 – Jackson Nicoll, child actor
- December 2 – Evie Clair, musical artist and reality television personality
- December 4
  - Daniel Dye, racing driver
- December 5 – Logan Robot Gladden, musician
- December 9 – Faith Torrez, gymnast
- December 10 – Colin Duffy, professional climber
- December 14 – Kate Finster, pair skater
- December 30 – Nicolette Pierini, child actress

== Deaths ==
=== January ===
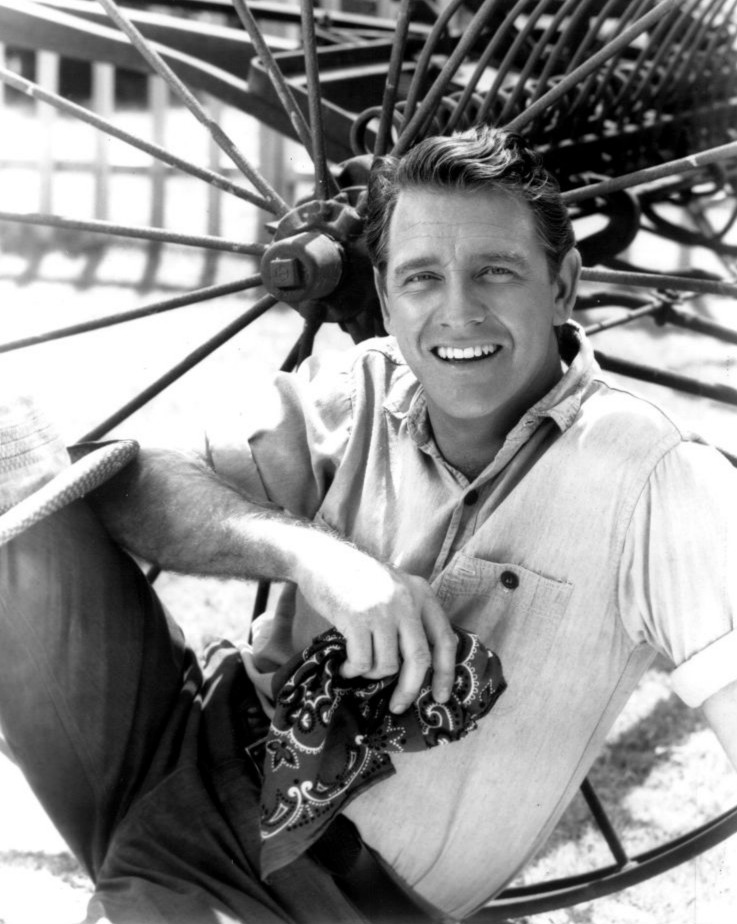
Richard Crenna

- January 1 – Royce D. Applegate, actor and screenwriter (b. 1939)
- January 3 – Sid Gillman, American football player, coach and executive (b. 1911)
- January 4 – Sabine Ulibarrí, poet and critic (b. 1919)
- January 11 – Richard Simmons, actor (b. 1913)
- January 12
  - Dean Amadon, ornithologist (b. 1912)
  - Maurice Gibb, British musician (b. 1949)
- January 15 – Doris Fisher, singer and songwriter (b. 1915)
- January 17
  - Fritzi Burr, actress (b. 1924)
  - Richard Crenna, actor (b. 1926)
- January 20
  - Al Hirschfeld, cartoonist (b. 1903)
  - Craig Kelly, snowboarder (b. 1966)
  - Nedra Volz, actress (b. 1908)
- January 23 – Nell Carter, singer and actress (b. 1948)
- January 25 – Robert Rockwell, actor (b. 1920)
- January 29 – Frank Moss, former United States Senator from Utah (b. 1911)

=== February ===
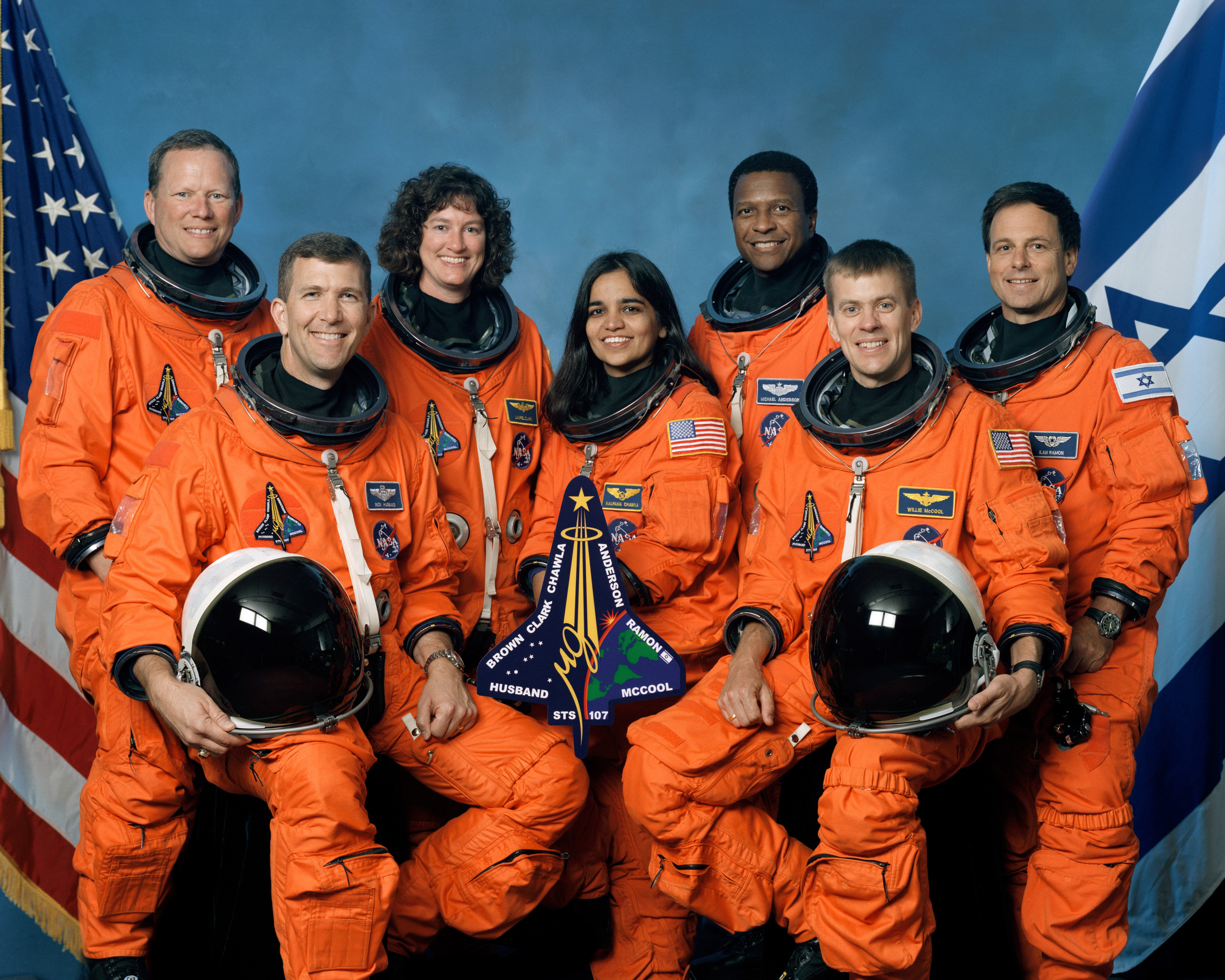
The crew of STS-107

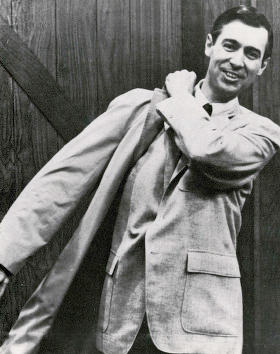
Fred Rogers

- February 1 – crew of the Space Shuttle Columbia on mission STS-107:

Michael P. Anderson, astronaut (b. 1959)
David M. Brown, astronaut and physician (b. 1956)
Kalpana Chawla, India-born American astronaut and aerospace engineer (b. 1961)
Laurel Clark, astronaut and physician (b. 1961)
Rick Husband, commander astronaut (b. 1957)
William McCool, astronaut (b. 1961)
Ilan Ramon, Israeli fighter pilot and astronaut (b. 1954)

- February 2 – Lou Harrison, composer (b. 1917)
- February 3 – Lana Clarkson, actress and model (b. 1962)
- February 8 – John Charles Cutler, surgeon (b. 1915)
- February 10
  - Edgar de Evia, Mexican-born American photographer (b. 1910)
  - Ron Ziegler, White House Press Secretary (b. 1939)
  - Curt Hennig, American wrestler (b. 1958)
- February 16 – Eleanor "Sis" Daley, wife of Chicago mayor Richard J. Daley (b. 1907)
- February 17 – Pete Schrum, American actor (b. 1934)
- February 19 – Johnny Paycheck, American singer and songwriter (b. 1938)
- February 20 – Orville Freeman, 29th Governor of Minnesota from 1955 through1959 (b. 1918)
- February 21 – Julie Mitchum, American actress (b. 1914)
- February 23 – Howie Epstein, American musician and producer (b. 1955)
- February 27 – Fred Rogers, American educator, minister, songwriter, writer, and television host (b. 1928)

=== March ===
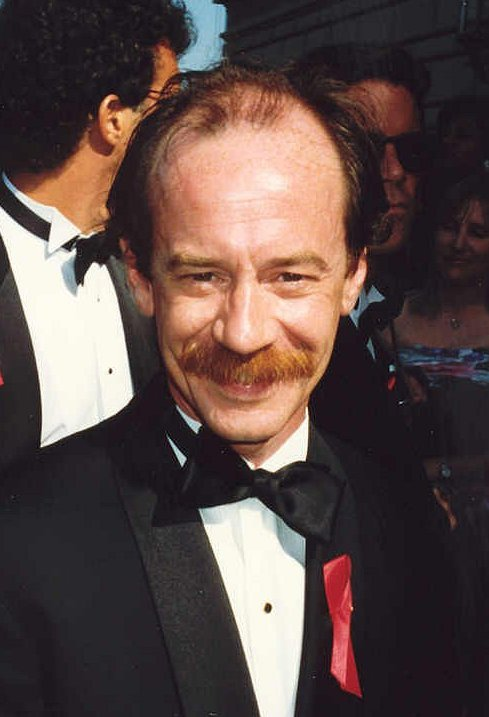
Michael Jeter

- March 1 – Elaine Barrie, American actress (b. 1915)
- March 2
  - Hank Ballard, American singer and songwriter (b. 1927)
  - Fred Freiberger, American screenwriter and television producer (b. 1915)
- March 3 – Ann A. Bernatitus, American U.S. Navy nurse (b. 1912)
- March 9 – Stan Brakhage, American filmmaker (b. 1933)
- March 12
  - Howard Fast, American novelist (b. 1914)
  - Lynne Thigpen, American actress (b. 1948)
- March 14 – Amanda Davis, American writer and teacher (b. 1971)
- March 16 – Rachel Corrie, American activist and diarist (b. 1979)
- March 20 – Sailor Art Thomas, American bodybuilder and wrestler (b. 1924)
- March 22 – Milton George Henschel, American minister and executive (b. 1920)
- March 26 – Daniel Patrick Moynihan, American politician (b. 1926)
- March 30 – Michael Jeter, American actor (b. 1952)
- March 31 - Anne Gwynne, American actress (b. 1918)

=== April ===
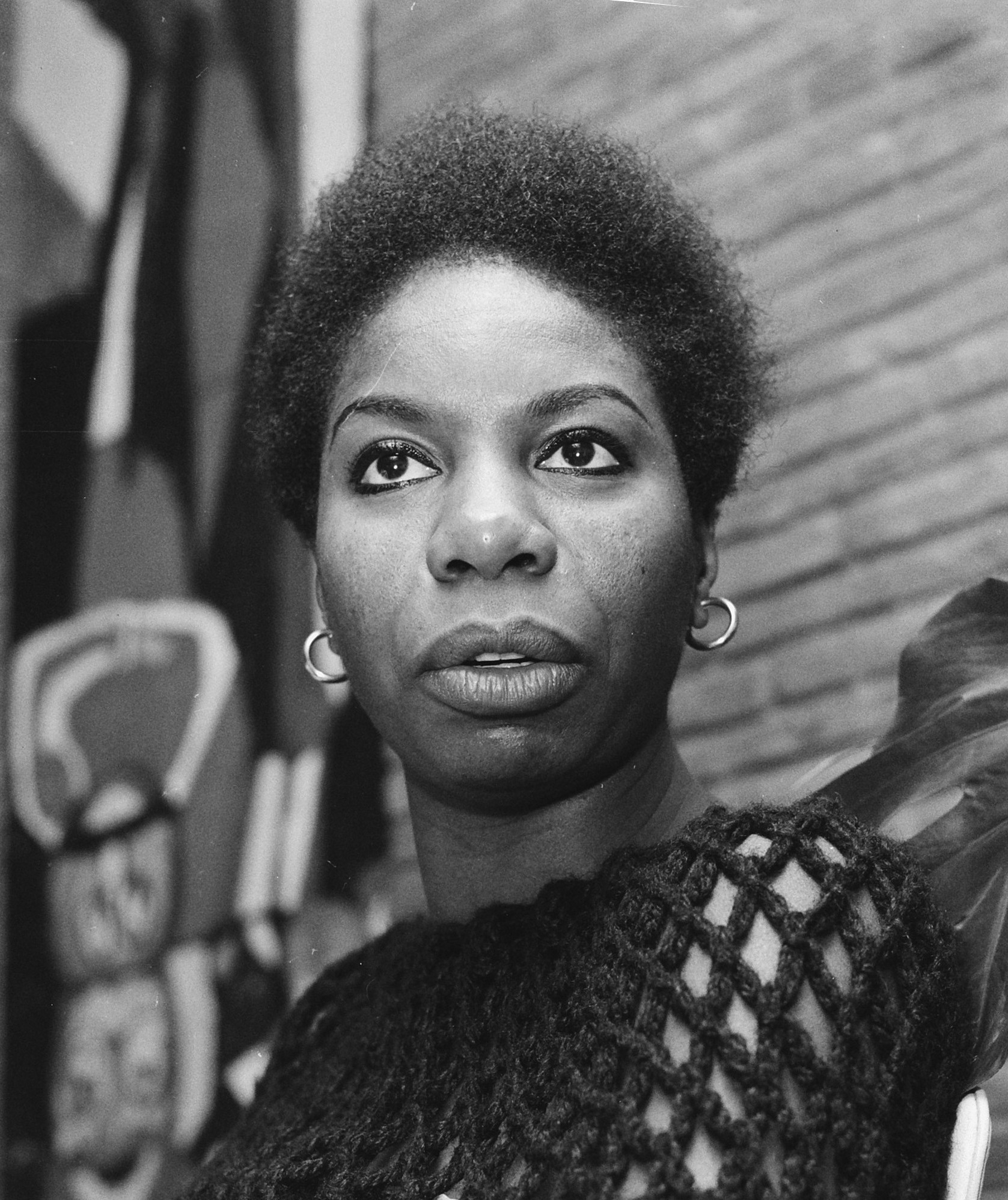
Nina Simone

- April 2 – Edwin Starr American soul singer (b. 1942)
- April 4 – Anthony Caruso, American actor (b. 1916)
- April 6
  - David Bloom, American journalist (b. 1963)
  - Susan French, American actress (b. 1912)
- April 8 – Bing Russell, American actor (b. 1926)
- April 10 – Little Eva, American singer (b. 1943)
- April 11 – Cecil Howard Green, British-born American geophysicist and businessman (b. 1900)
- April 14 – Addie McPhail, American actress (b. 1905)
- April 17
  - Robert Atkins, American physician (b. 1930)
  - Paul Getty, American-born British philanthropist (b. 1932)
  - Earl King, American singer, songwriter, and guitarist (b. 1934)
- April 16 – Graham Jarvis, Canadian actor (b. 1930)
- April 17 – Robert Atkins, American physician, namesake of the Atkins diet (b. 1930)
- April 20 – Ruth Hale, writer and actress (b. 1908)
- April 21 – Nina Simone, American singer, songwriter, pianist, arranger, and civil rights activist (b. 1933)
- April 22 – Mike Larrabee, American Olympic athlete (b. 1933)
- April 26 – Peter Stone, American screenwriter (b. 1930)

=== May ===
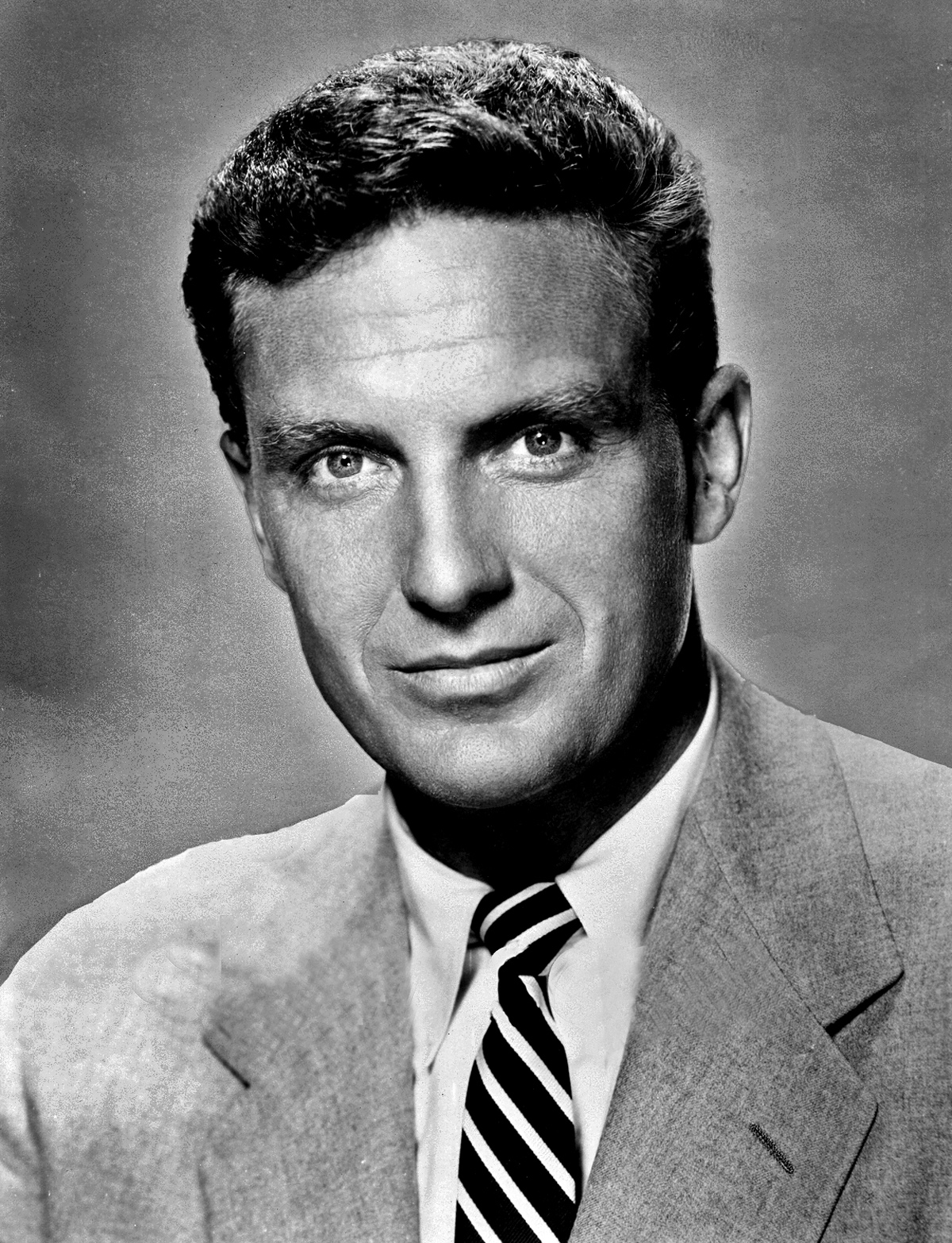
Robert Stack

- May 1 – Miss Elizabeth, American wrestling manager and valet (b. 1960)
- May 3 – Suzy Parker, American model and actress (b. 1932)
- May 9
  - Carmen Filpi, American actor (b. 1923)
  - Russell B. Long, American politician (b. 1918)
- May 14
  - Dave DeBusschere, American basketball player (b. 1940)
  - Robert Stack, American actor and television host (b. 1919)
- May 15 – June Carter Cash, American singer, dancer, songwriter, actress, comedian, and writer (b. 1929)
- May 17 – Pop Ivy, American-Canadian football player and coach (b. 1916)
- May 24 – Rachel Kempson, British actress (b. 1910)
- May 26 – Kathleen Winsor, American writer (b. 1919)
- May 28 – Martha Scott, American actress (b. 1912)

=== June ===
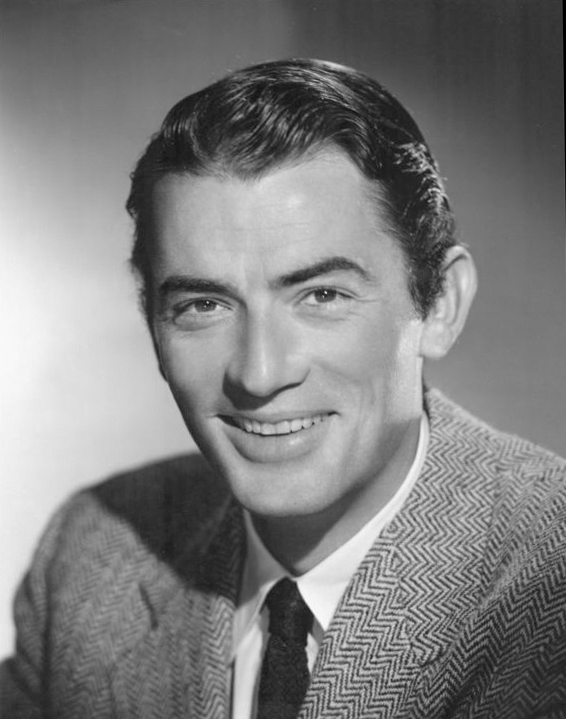
Gregory Peck

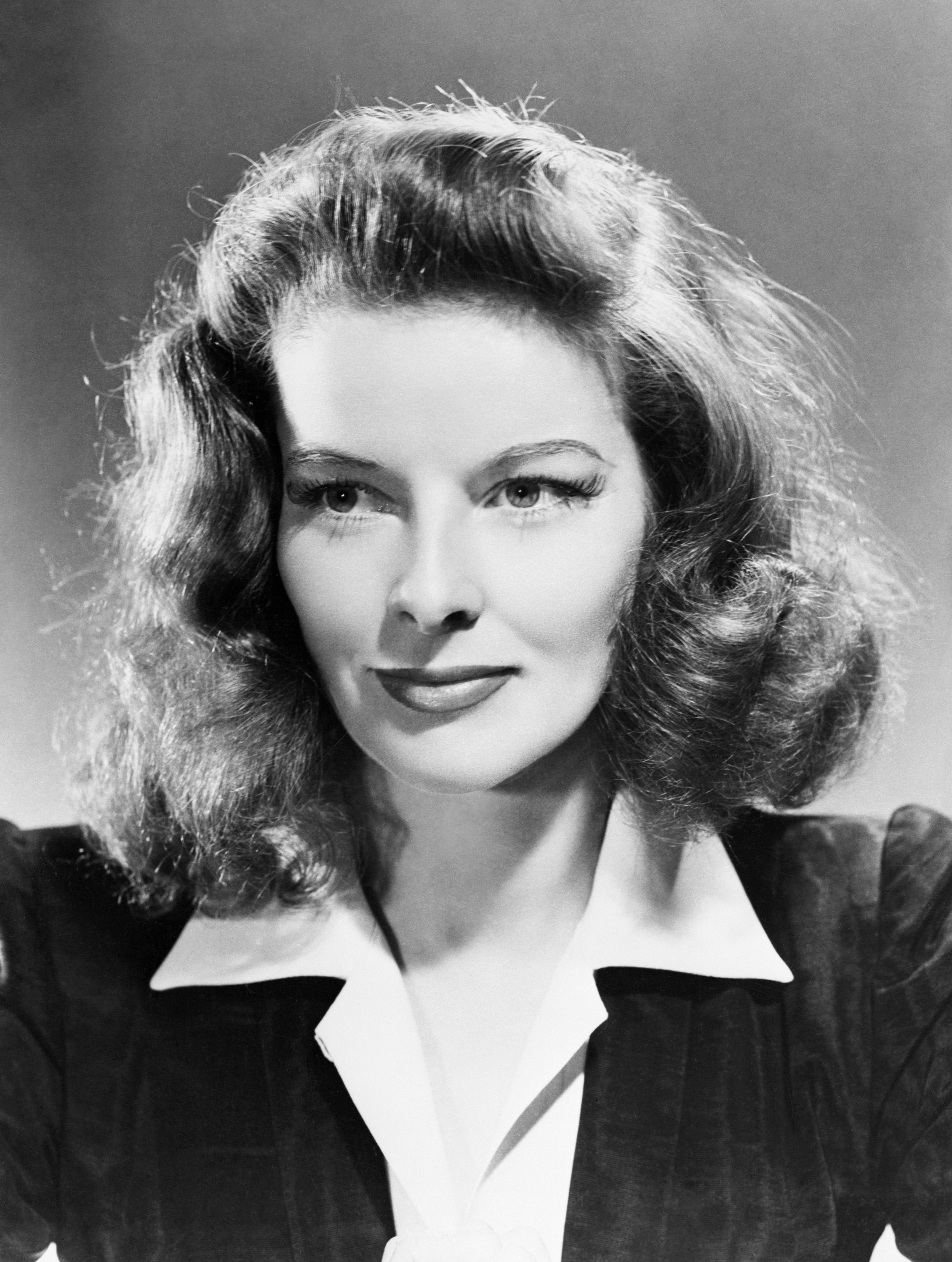
Katharine Hepburn

- June 2
  - Fred Blassie, American wrestler and manager (b. 1918)
  - Dick Cusack, American actor, filmmaker and humorist (b. 1925)
  - Burke Marshall, American civil rights lawyer (b. 1922)
- June 6 – Ken Grimwood, American writer (b. 1944)
- June 7 – Trevor Goddard, English actor (b. 1962)
- June 10 – Donald Regan, 66th United States Secretary of the Treasury (b. 1918)
- June 11
  - David Brinkley, American television journalist (b. 1920)
  - William Marshall, American actor, singer, and director (b. 1924)
- June 12 – Gregory Peck, American actor (b. 1916)
- June 14 – Jimmy Knepper, American musician (b. 1927)
- June 15 – Hume Cronyn, Canadian-American actor (b. 1911)
- June 18 – Larry Doby, American baseball player and manager (b. 1923)
- June 20 – Bob Stump, American politician (b. 1927)
- June 21 – Leon Uris, American writer (b. 1924)
- June 23 – Maynard Jackson, American politician (b. 1938)
- June 25 – Lester Maddox, American politician (b. 1915)
- June 26 – Strom Thurmond, American politician (b. 1902)
- June 29 – Katharine Hepburn, American actress (b. 1907)
- June 30 – Buddy Hackett, American comedian and actor (b. 1924)

=== July ===
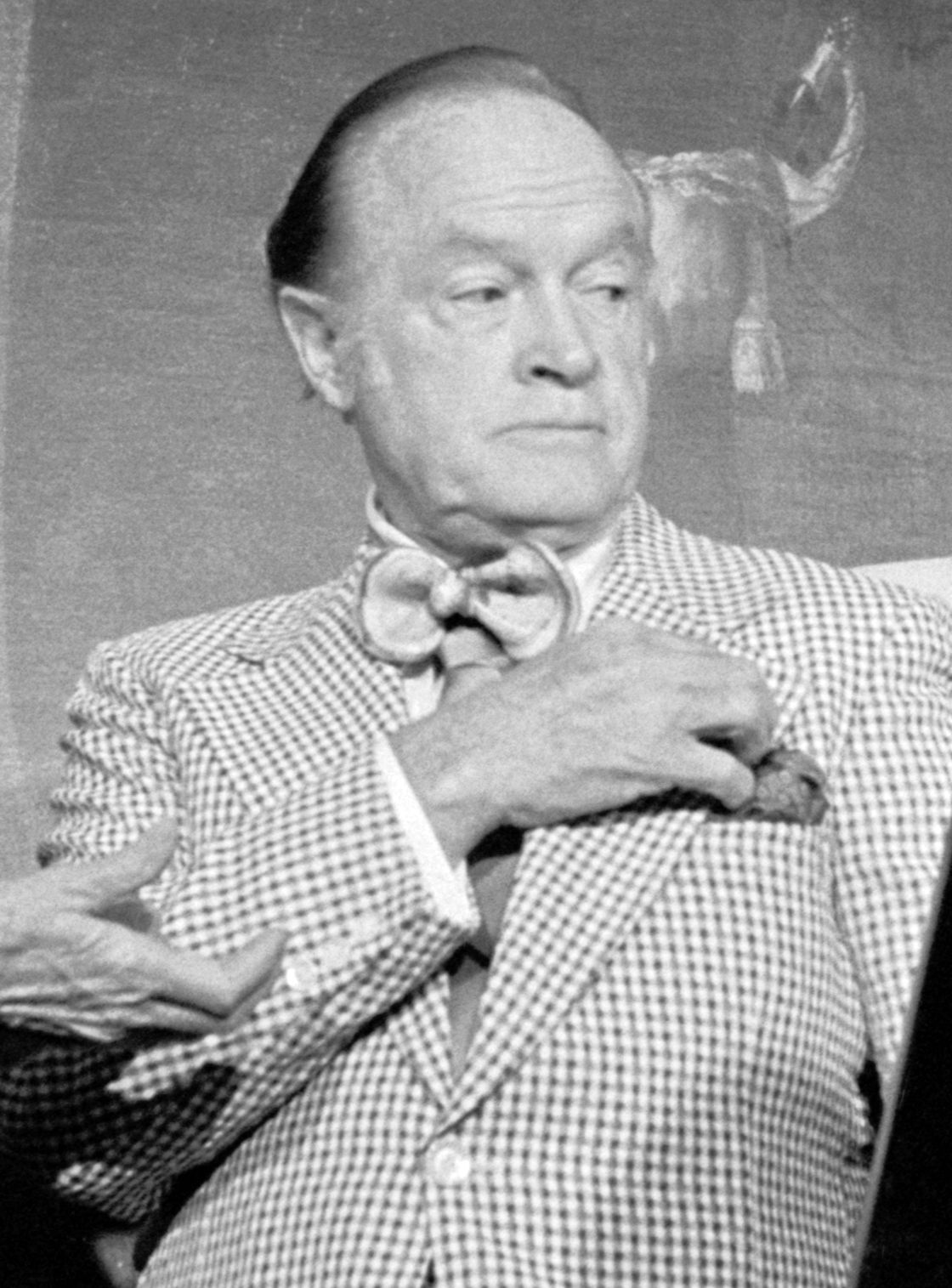
Bob Hope

- July 1 – Herbie Mann, musician (b. 1930)
- July 4 – Barry White, singer and songwriter (b. 1944)
- July 6 – Buddy Ebsen, actor and dancer (b. 1908)
- July 12 – Benny Carter, musician (b. 1907)
- July 15 – Tex Schramm, American football executive (b. 1920)
- July 16
  - Celia Cruz, Cuban-American singer (b. 1925)
  - Carol Shields, American-born Canadian writer (b. 1935)
- July 17 – Rosalyn Tureck, pianist and harpsichordist (b. 1913)
- July 25
  - Erik Brann, American musician (b. 1950)
  - John Schlesinger, English director (b. 1926)
- July 27 – Bob Hope, English-American actor, singer, dancer, and comedian (b. 1903)
- July 28 – Greg Guidry, American singer-songwriter (b. 1954)
- July 30
  - Gene Hasson, Major League baseball player (b. 1915)
  - Sam Phillips, record producer (b. 1923)

=== August ===
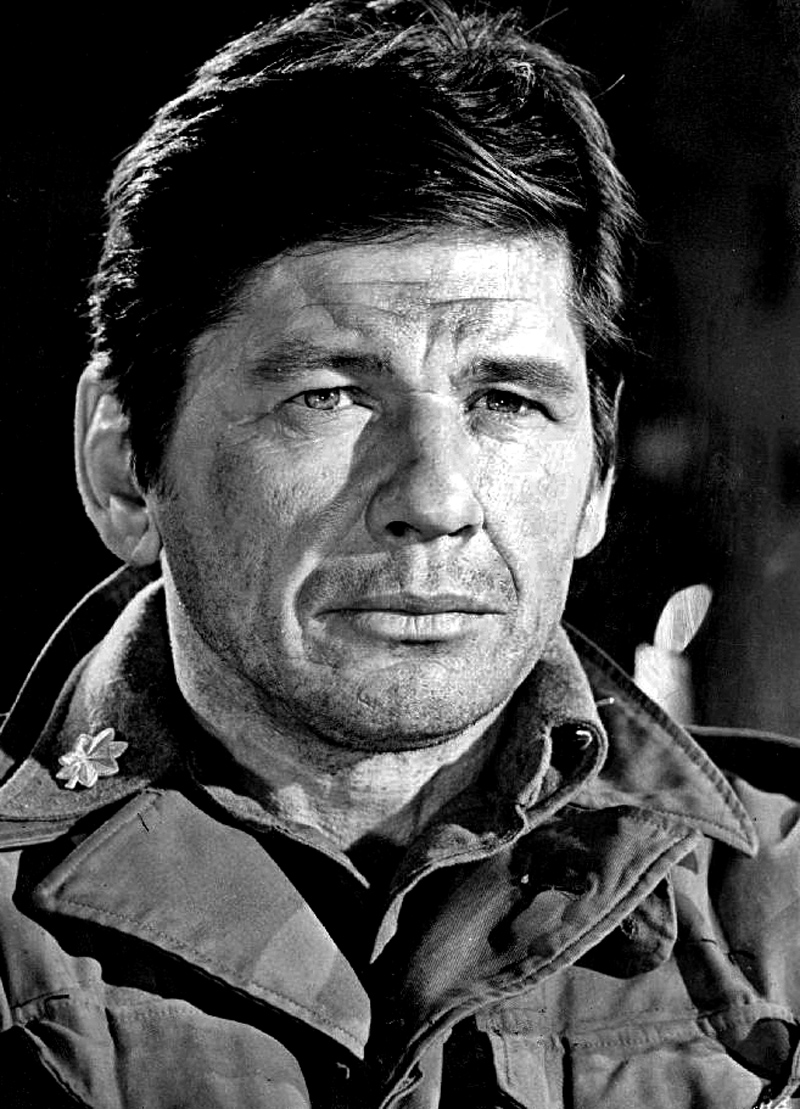
Charles Bronson

- August 3 – Roger Voudouris, American singer-songwriter and guitarist (b. 1954)
- August 4 – Frederick Chapman Robbins, American Nobel pediatrician and virologist (b. 1916)
- August 6 – Julius Baker, American flute player (b. 1915)
- August 9 – Gregory Hines, American actor, singer, dancer, and choreographer (b. 1946)
- August 11 – Herb Brooks, American hockey player and coach (b. 1937)
- August 21 – Wesley Willis, American musician (b. 1963)
- August 23 – Bobby Bonds, American baseball player (b. 1946)
- August 26 – Wilma Burgess, American country musician (b. 1939)
- August 28 – Brian Douglas Wells, criminal and murder victim (b. 1956)
- August 30 – Charles Bronson, American actor (b. 1921)

=== September ===
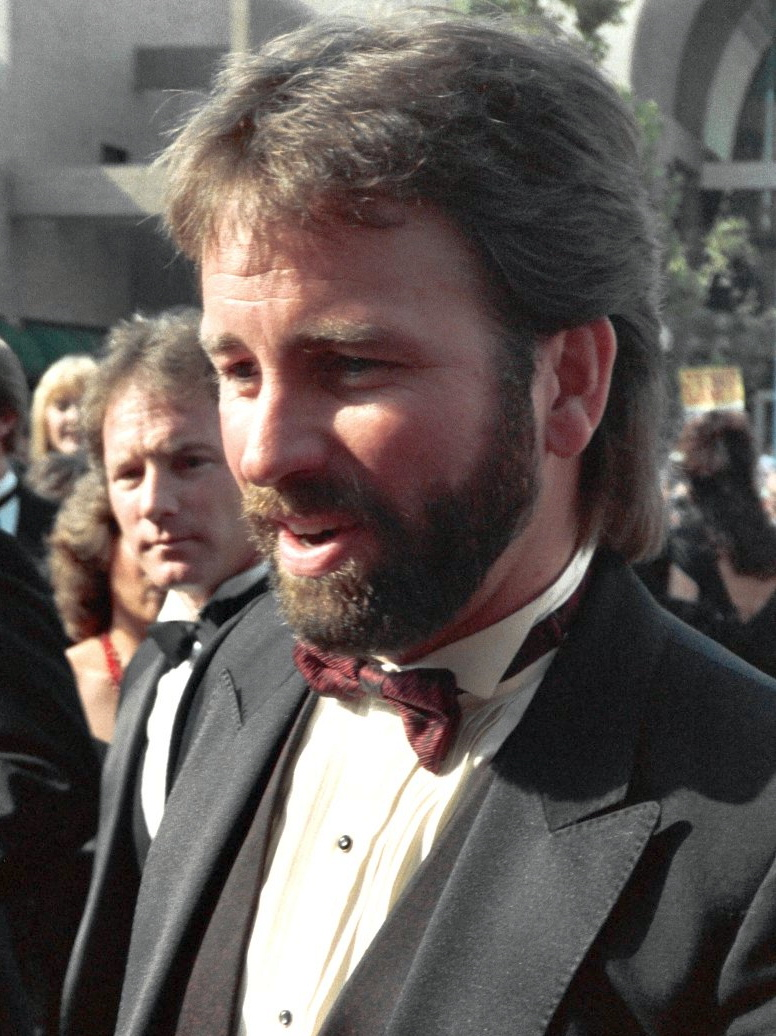
John Ritter

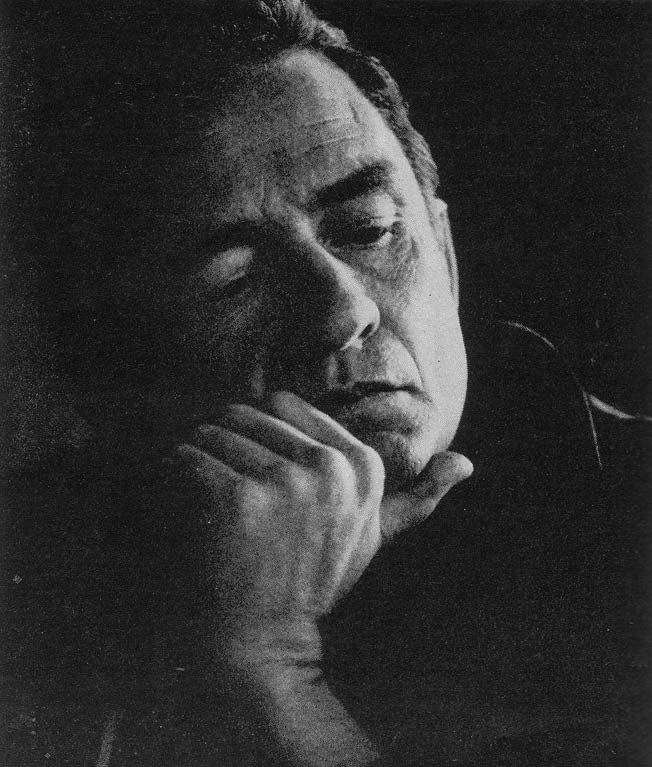
Johnny Cash

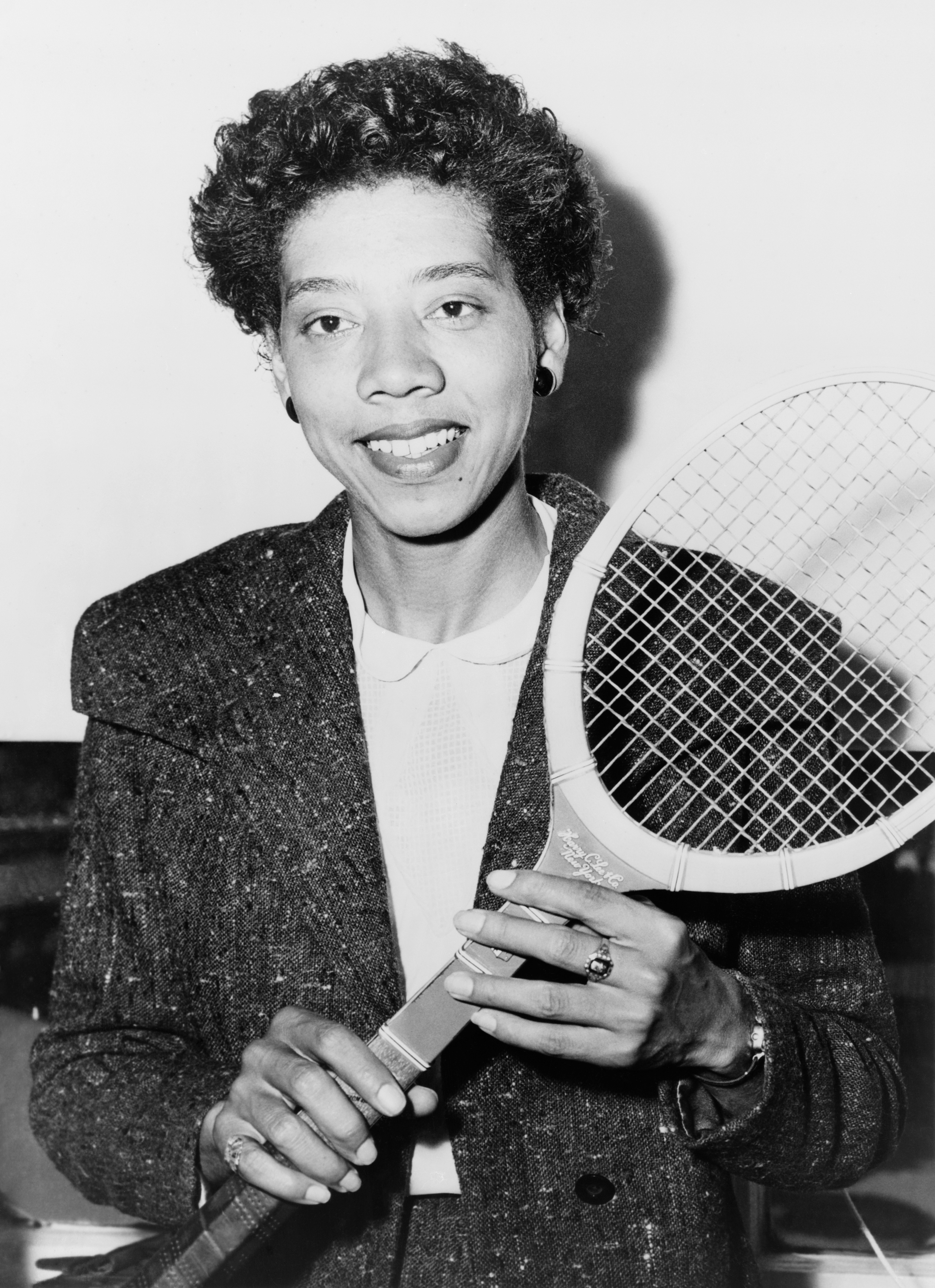
Althea Gibson

- September 1
  - Rand Brooks, American actor (b. 1918)
  - John Gould, American humorist, essayist, and columnist (b. 1908)
- September 3 – Ma Dunjing, Chinese General, died in Los Angeles, California (b. 1910)
- September 5 – Gisele MacKenzie, Canadian-American singer and actress (b. 1927)
- September 6 – Harry Goz, American actor (b. 1932)
- September 7 – Warren Zevon, American singer, songwriter, and musician (b. 1947)
- September 9
  - Larry Hovis, American actor (b. 1936)
  - Edward Teller, Hungarian-American physicist (b. 1908)
- September 11
  - Joe Hall Morris, American oral surgeon and university educator (b. 1922)
  - John Ritter, American actor and comedian (b. 1948)
- September 12 – Johnny Cash, American singer, songwriter, musician, and actor (b. 1932)
- September 13 – Frank O'Bannon, 47th Governor of Indiana from 1997 to 2003. (b. 1930)
- September 14 – John Serry Sr., Italian-American musician (b. 1915)
- September 16 – Sheb Wooley, American actor, singer, and songwriter (b. 1921)
- September 20 – Stanley Farfara, American actor (b. 1949)
- September 22 – Gordon Jump, American actor (b. 1932)
- September 25
  - Franco Modigliani, Italian-American Nobel economist (b. 1918)
  - George Plimpton, American journalist, writer, and actor (b. 1927)
  - Edward Said, Palestinian-American literary critic (b. 1935)
- September 26 – Shawn Lane, American musician (b. 1963)
- September 27 – Donald O'Connor, American actor, singer, and dancer (b. 1925)
- September 28
  - Althea Gibson, American tennis player (b. 1927)
  - Elia Kazan, Greek-American director (b. 1909)
- September 30 – Robert Kardashian, American attorney and businessman (b. 1944)

=== October ===
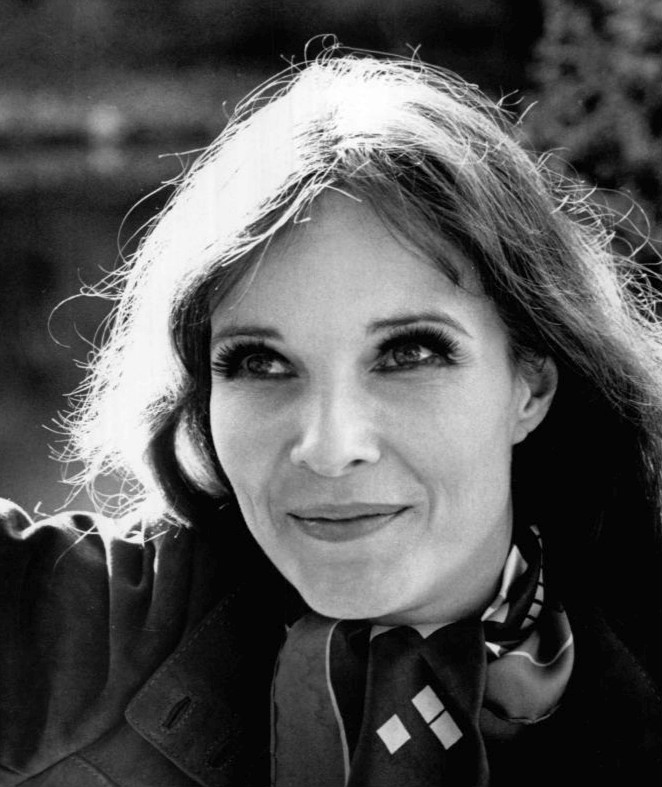
Janice Rule

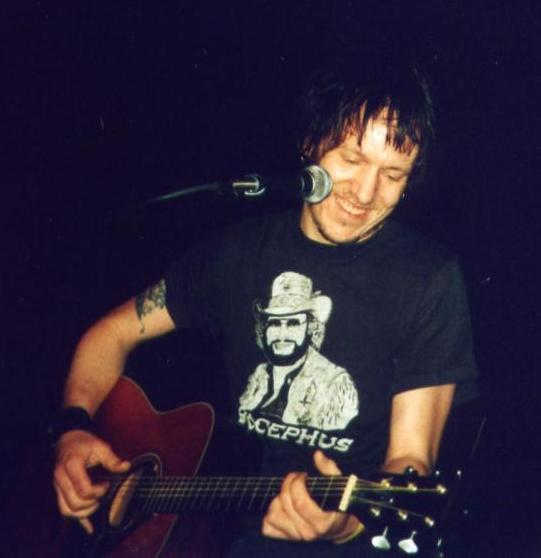
Elliott Smith

- October 3
  - Florence Stanley, American actress (b. 1924)
  - William Steig, American cartoonist, illustrator, and writer (b. 1907)
- October 5
  - Neil Postman, American writer, media theorist, and cultural critic (b. 1931)
  - Timothy Treadwell, American bear enthusiast, environmentalist and documentary film maker (b. 1957)
- October 8 – Thalia Mara, American ballet dancer, educator and author (b. 1911)
- October 10 – Eugene Istomin, American pianist (b. 1925)
- October 12 – Bill Shoemaker, American jockey (b. 1931)
- October 17 – Janice Rule, American actress (b. 1931)
- October 19
  - Margaret Murie, American environmentalist and author (b. 1902)
  - Road Warrior Hawk, American professional wrestler (b. 1957)
- October 20 – Jack Elam, American actor (b. 1920)
- October 21
  - Fred Berry, American actor (b. 1951)
  - Elliott Smith, American singer, songwriter, and musician (b. 1969)
- October 22 – Tony Renna, American race car driver (b. 1976)
- October 25 – Robert Strassburg, American conductor, composer, musicologist, and music educator (b. 1915)
- October 27 – Rod Roddy, American television announcer (b. 1937)
- October 29 – Hal Clement, American writer (b. 1922)
- October 30 – Walter Trohan, American journalist (b. 1903)
- October 31 – Richard Neustadt, American political scientist (b. 1919)

=== November ===
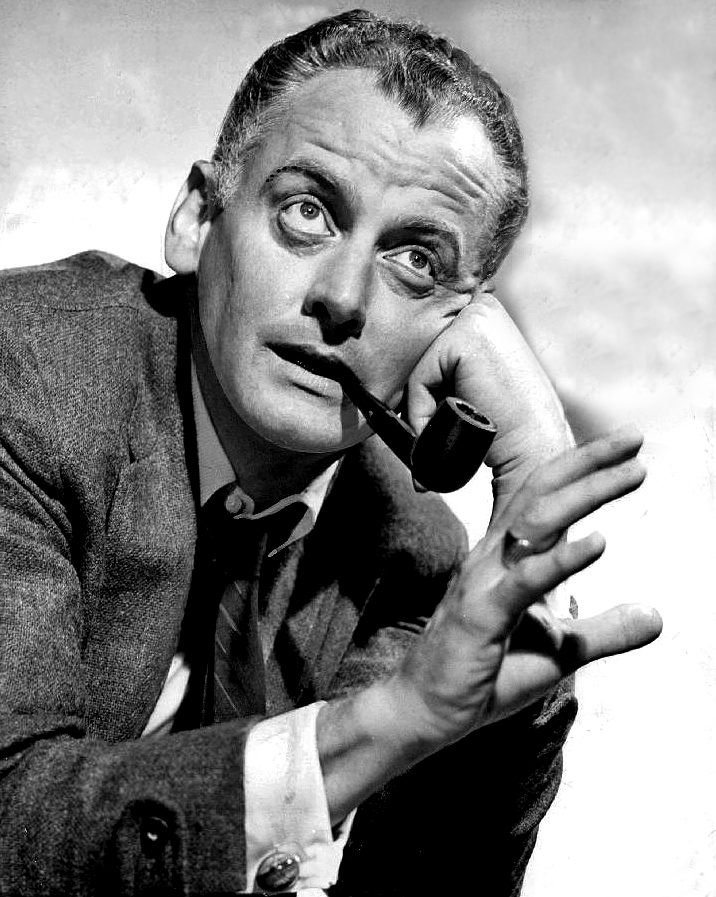
Art Carney

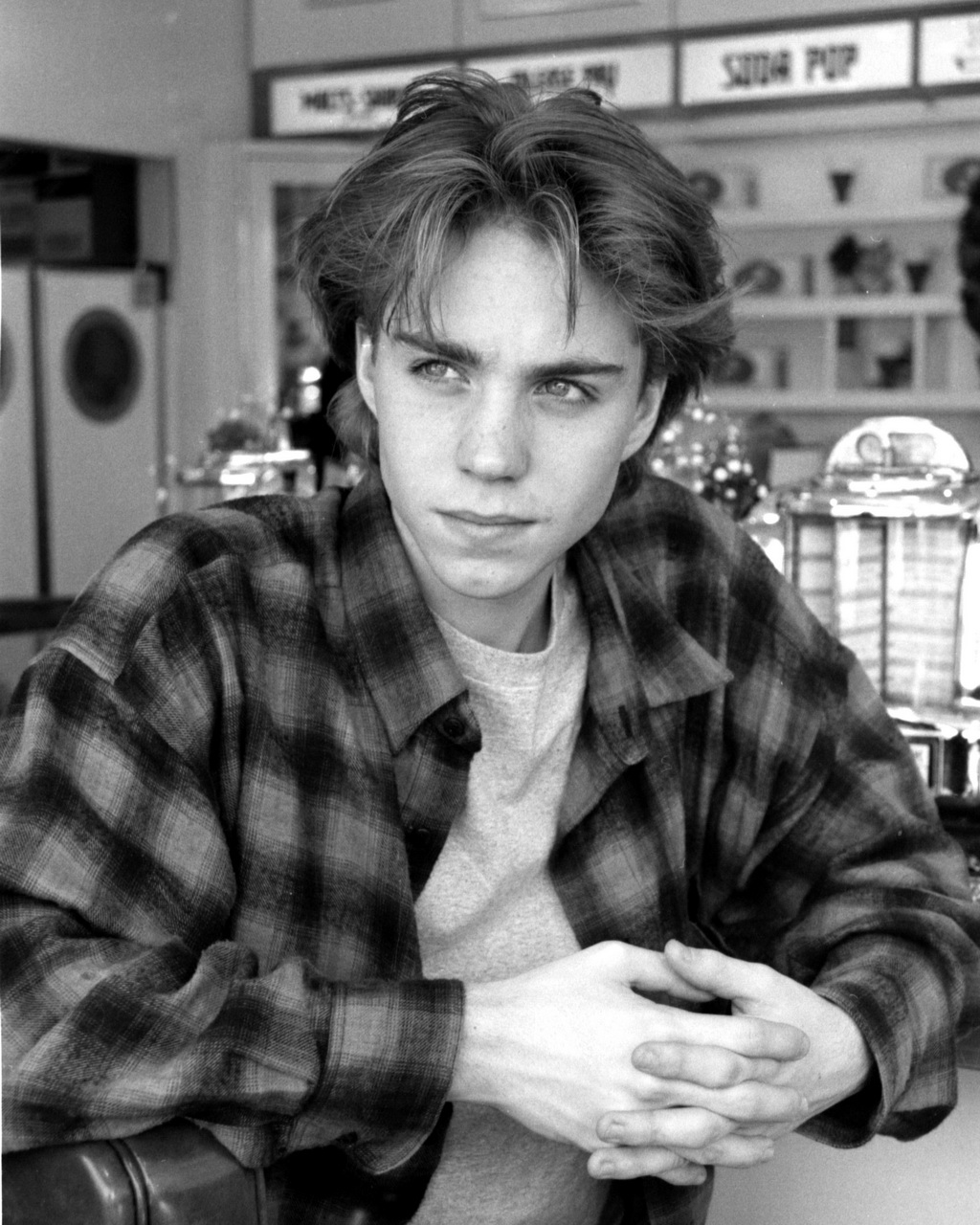
Jonathan Brandis

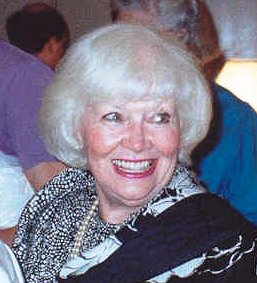
Penny Singleton

- November 5
  - Dorothy Fay, American actress (b. 1915)
  - Bobby Hatfield, American singer (b. 1940)
- November 6
  - Crash Holly, American wrestler (b. 1971)
  - Spider Jorgensen, American baseball player and coach (b. 1919)
- November 7 – Jack Durrance, rock climber and mountaineer (b. 1912)
- November 9 – Art Carney, American actor (b. 1918)
- November 10 – Irv Kupcinet, American columnist and television personality (b. 1912)
- November 12
  - Jonathan Brandis, American actor, director, and screenwriter (b. 1976)
  - Kay E. Kuter, American actor (b. 1925)
  - Penny Singleton, American actress (b. 1908)
- November 13 – Kellie Waymire, American actress (b. 1967)
- November 14
  - Gene Anthony Ray, American actor, dancer, and choreographer (b. 1962)
  - Carding Castro, Filipino actor and comedian (b. 1933)
- November 15
  - Dorothy Loudon, American actress and singer (b. 1925)
  - Laurence Tisch, American businessman, co-founded the Loews Corporation (b. 1923)
  - Speedy West, American guitarist and producer (b. 1924)
- November 17
  - Arthur Conley, American singer (b. 1946)
  - Don Gibson, American country musician (b. 1928)
- November 18
  - Patricia Broderick, American playwright and painter (b. 1925)
  - Michael Kamen, American composer, conductor, and songwriter (b. 1948)
- November 20 – Jim Siedow, American actor (b. 1920)
- November 24 – Warren Spahn, American baseball player (b. 1921)
- November 26 – Soulja Slim, American rapper, songwriter, and murder victim (b. 1977)
- November 29 – Moondog Spot, American professional wrestler (b. 1952)
- November 30 – Gertrude Ederle, American swimmer (b. 1905)

=== December ===
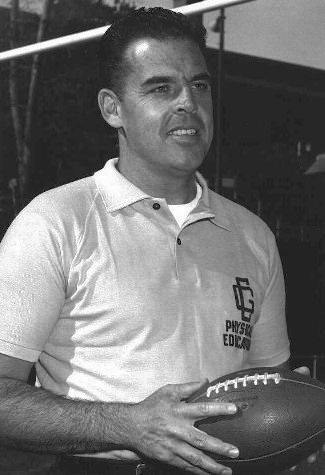
Otto Graham

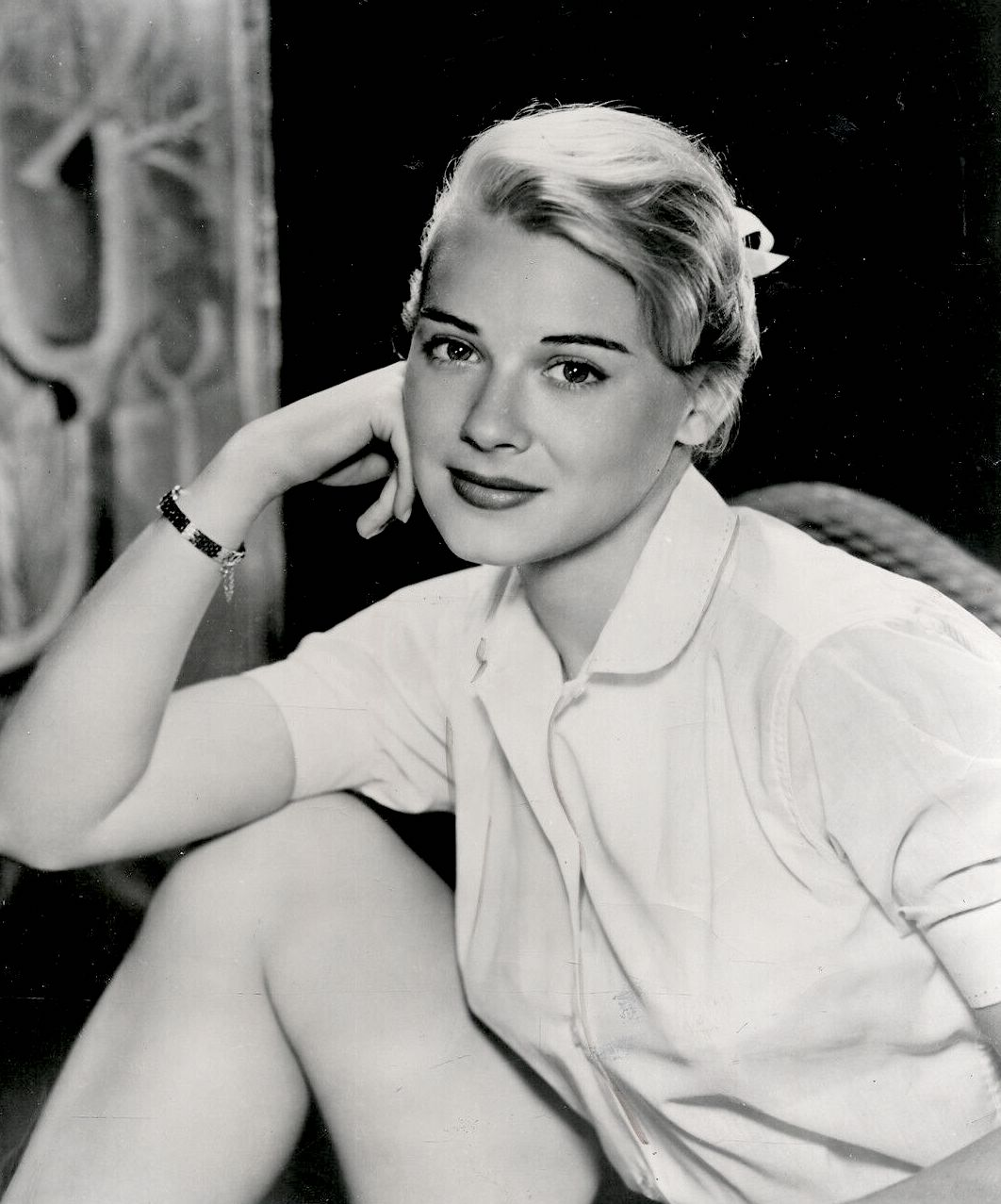
Hope Lange

- December 3 – Ellen Drew, American actress (b. 1915)
- December 4 – Iggy Katona, American race car driver (b. 1916)
- December 7
  - Carl F. H. Henry, American theologian and publisher (b. 1913)
  - Azie Taylor Morton, 36th Treasurer of the United States (b. 1936)
- December 9 – Paul Simon, American politician (b. 1928)
- December 13 – William Roth, American politician (b. 1921)
- December 14 – Jeanne Crain, American actress (b. 1925)
- December 15 – George Fisher, American political cartoonist (b. 1923)
- December 16
  - Madlyn Rhue, American actress (b. 1935)
  - Gary Stewart, American singer, songwriter, and musician (b. 1944)
- December 17 – Otto Graham, American football player and coach (b. 1921)
- December 19 – Hope Lange, American actress (b. 1933)
- December 22
  - Dave Dudley, American singer (b. 1928)
  - John Holter, American toolmaker and medical device inventor (b. 1916)
- December 27
  - Iván Calderón, Puerto Rican-American baseball player (b. 1962)
  - Pete Alvarado, American animator and comic book artist (b. 1920)
- December 28 – Helen Kleeb, American actress (b. 1907)
- December 29 – Earl Hindman, American actor (b. 1942)
- December 30 – John Gregory Dunne, American writer, screenwriter, literary critic, and journalist (b. 1932)

== See also ==
- 2003 in American soccer
- 2003 in American television
- List of American films of 2003
- Timeline of United States history (1990–2009)
