= Óscar Faura =

Spanish cinematographer

- Born: 28 March 1975 (age 51); Barcelona, Spain
- Education: Barcelona Film School
- Years active: 1999–present
- Website: oscarfaura.com

Óscar Faura is a Spanish cinematographer.

== Career ==
Faura graduated from ESCAC Film School and has been a cinematographer since 1999, working for both film and advertisement industry.

He shot the international hit The Orphanage (2007), a nominee for the European Film Award and garnered further acclaim for The Impossible (2012).

Other successful films under his credits include Mindscape (2013) and The Imitation Game (2014).

== Filmography ==
=== Film ===
Year	Title	Director	Notes
2007	The Orphanage	J. A. Bayona	
2009	Spanish Movie	Javier Ruiz Caldera	
2010	Julia's Eyes	Guillem Morales	
2012	The Body	Oriol Paulo	
2012	The Impossible	J. A. Bayona	
2013	Mindscape	Jorge Dorado	
2014	The Imitation Game	Morten Tyldum	
2016	A Monster Calls	J. A. Bayona	
2018	Jurassic World: Fallen Kingdom	J. A. Bayona	
2021	Fever Dream	Claudia Llosa	
2024	Young Woman and the Sea	Joachim Rønning	
2026	Moana	Thomas Kail	
TBA	Ibelin †	Morten Tyldum	Filming

=== Television ===
Year	Title	Director	Note
2022	The Lord of the Rings: The Rings of Power	J. A. Bayona	Episodes "A Shadow of the Past" and "Adrift"

== Awards and nominations ==
Year	Title	Award/Nomination
2007	The Orphanage	Barcelona Film Award for Best Cinematography; Central Ohio Film Critics Association Award for Best Cinematography; Nominated- European Film Award for Best Cinematographer; Nominated- Cinema Writers Circle Award for Best Cinematography
2010	Julia's Eyes	Nominated- Gaudí Award for Best Cinematography
2012	The Impossible	Gaudí Award for Best Cinematography; Nominated- Cinema Writers Circle Award for Best Cinematography; Nominated- Goya Award for Best Cinematography
2014	The Imitation Game	Nominated- ASC Award for Outstanding Achievement in Cinematography
2016	A Monster Calls	Goya Award for Best Cinematography; Nominated- Gaudí Award for Best Cinematography
2018	Jurassic World: Fallen Kingdom	Award- Gaudí Award for Best Cinematography
