= A Shadow of the Past =

- The Lord of the Rings: The Rings of Power episode
- Cover art for the episode's soundtrack album
- Episode no.: Season 1 Episode 1
- Directed by: J. A. Bayona
- Written by: J. D. Payne; Patrick McKay
- Cinematography by: Óscar Faura
- Editing by: Bernat Vilaplana; Jaume Martí
- Original release date: September 1, 2022
- Running time: 66 minutes

Additional cast
- Amelie Child-Villiers as young Galadriel; Will Fletcher as Finrod; Fabian McCallum as Thondir; Kip Chapman as Rían; Thusitha Jayasundera as Malva; Maxine Cunliffe as Vilma; Beau Cassidy as Dilly Brandyfoot; Geoff Morrell as Waldreg; Peter Tait as Tredwill; Ian Blackburn as Rowan; Augustus Prew as Médhor; Simon Merrells as Revion

Episode chronology
← Previous —	Next → "Adrift"
- The Lord of the Rings: The Rings of Power season 1

"A Shadow of the Past" is the first episode of the first season and series premiere of the American fantasy television series The Lord of the Rings: The Rings of Power, which is based on J. R. R. Tolkien's history of Middle-earth. It was written by showrunners J. D. Payne and Patrick McKay, and directed by J. A. Bayona.

The series is set thousands of years before Tolkien's novel The Lord of the Rings (1954–55), during the Second Age of Middle-earth. This episode begins with a recap of the First Age, and then introduces some of the story's key cultures: the Elves, the Men of the Southlands, and the Harfoots. Each culture was defined through designs, dialects, and music, and introduced at a time of change for their people. Filming for the first season began in New Zealand in February 2020, but was placed on hold in March due to the COVID-19 pandemic. Production resumed in September and wrapped for the first two episodes by the end of December.

"A Shadow of the Past" premiered on the streaming service Amazon Prime Video on September 1, 2022, with the second episode. They had the most viewers of any Prime Video premiere within 24 hours. Reviews were generally positive, with praise for the visuals and high production value but skepticism regarding the storytelling and slow pacing. The episode received several award nominations, including a Primetime Creative Arts Emmy Award nomination for its costume design.

== Background ==
The Lord of the Rings: The Rings of Power is based on J. R. R. Tolkien's history of Middle-earth. It is set thousands of years before his novels The Hobbit (1937) and The Lord of the Rings (1954–55). While it is contractually not a continuation of Peter Jackson's The Lord of the Rings (2001–2003) and The Hobbit (2012–2014) film trilogies, it is intended to be visually consistent with them, and the first season was produced in New Zealand like Jackson's films were. J. D. Payne and Patrick McKay were hired to develop the series and serve as its showrunners, with J. A. Bayona set to direct the first two episodes of the first season.

The series covers the major events of Middle-earth's Second Age. Amazon did not acquire the rights to Tolkien's main Second Age writings, so the writers identified references to the period in The Hobbit, The Lord of the Rings, and the latter's appendices, and created a story that bridges those passages. The Second Age begins after the defeat of the "Dark Lord" Morgoth, when his army of Orcs are scattered and his lieutenant Sauron is in hiding. The large cast of characters includes Elves, Dwarves, Men, and Harfoots, the last being precursors to the diminutive Hobbits from The Hobbit and The Lord of the Rings.

== Plot ==
When the two trees that lit the world were destroyed by Morgoth, the Elves sailed to Middle-earth from their home in Valinor and waged a centuries-long war against him. Morgoth was defeated, and Sauron took his place. Galadriel's brother Finrod died hunting Sauron, and Galadriel vowed to continue the search. Thousands of years later, Galadriel and a company of Elves discover an abandoned fortress in the northern wastelands of Forodwaith. They are attacked by a Snow-troll and sustain injuries before Galadriel kills it. She wishes to continue, but the others refuse and she reluctantly returns to the Elven capital Lindon.

A community of nomadic Harfoots in the wilderlands of Rhovanion are surprised to see human hunters at an uncommon time of year. Harfoot elder Sadoc Burrows also believes the stars are appearing when they should not be and wonders whether they are watching something unfold. Young Harfoot Nori Brandyfoot dreams of exploring the world but is discouraged by her parents, as it is their way to follow their well-trodden paths.

In Lindon, High King Gil-galad proclaims the war to be over and grants Galadriel's company the honor of returning to Valinor, where they can live in eternal peace. Galadriel's friend Elrond convinces her to accept the offer. Gil-galad tells Elrond that Galadriel's search for Sauron could help the latter endure. He introduces Elrond to Celebrimbor, a great Elven-smith, who is beginning an important project that Gil-galad wants Elrond to help with.

Word that the war is over reaches Elves in the Southlands of Middle-earth who watch over Tirharad, a village of Men descended from allies of Morgoth. The Elf Arondir has grown close with the human healer Bronwyn and is saying goodbye to her when a villager arrives with a sick cow. It wandered to the nearby village of Hordern, which the pair investigate and find in flames. Bronwyn's son Theo finds a broken sword bearing Sauron's mark.

Across the Sundering Seas, Galadriel and her company prepare to enter Valinor through a wall of cloud and light. Remembering a discussion with Finrod, Galadriel changes her mind about abandoning her search and jumps from the ship before it enters. At the same time, different groups across Middle-earth watch a meteor fly through the sky. It crashes near the Harfoots' camp and Nori finds a strange man in the crater.

== Production ==
=== Writing ===
The premiere episode was written by Payne and McKay. Its title, "A Shadow of the Past", is an allusion to the second chapter of The Lord of the Rings, "The Shadow of the Past". McKay said the season was influenced by dialogue from that chapter which he paraphrased as "After a defeat and a respite, a shadow grows again in a new form." The season introduces the Second Age and its major heroic characters, with each group being introduced at "a time of enormous change in their worlds" which the showrunners hoped would make the series more dramatic. They felt it was essential to establish relationships in the first episode that the audience could invest in, such as the Romeo and Juliet inspired love story between Arondir and Bronwyn, the hijinks-filled friendship between the young Harfoots Nori Brandyfoot and Poppy Proudfellow, and the respectful relationship between Galadriel and Elrond. McKay described the last two as "almost peers, but not quite". Elrond's introduction sitting in a tree was inspired by the film Young Mr. Lincoln (1939).

The showrunners chose to begin the series with an "intimate" flashback sequence showing a young Galadriel talking with Finrod under a tree. McKay said this was a conscious decision to subvert expectations for the "vast and incredible epic" that they felt audiences would be expecting. The episode then gives a recap of the First Age. Because they did not have access to Tolkien's The Silmarillion (1977), the showrunners had to write material that "harmonizes" with what that novel says about the First Age, without directly adapting anything that is not also covered by The Lord of the Rings and its appendices. They described this as a very high-level summary using general mythological terms that would be accessible to all audiences: there was a "great foe", Morgoth, whose actions triggered a war. This sequence went through hundreds of drafts throughout pre-production, filming, and post-production, and had the most iteration of any sequence in the season; the final version was settled on only days before the episode was completed. The showrunners believed that their version allowed Tolkien fans to fill in the gaps with their own knowledge, and hoped new fans who were intrigued by the sequence would read The Silmarillion to learn more about the First Age.

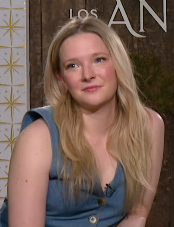
Morfydd Clark stars as Galadriel, one of the series' main characters.

After the prologue, the episode jumps forward to an older Galadriel who is still much younger than she is in The Lord of the Rings. Actress Morfydd Clark felt naïveté would show in Elves as arrogance, and was influenced by a quote from the character about "how with gaining wisdom, there's a loss of innocence". Galadriel's characterization in the series differs from the "elder stateswoman" that she is portrayed as in The Lord of the Rings, allowing the series to show her journey to becoming that version of the character. The writers took inspiration from Tolkien's description of a younger Galadriel as being a strong fighter of "Amazon disposition". Clark said the Elves of the Second Age feel the weight of their actions during the First, and Galadriel feels the weight of losing her brothers during the war. She said Galadriel is lonely and wearied as the sole survivor of her family. The episode highlights her relationship with Finrod, who Clark said was a particular favorite among fans of Tolkien. After Finrod's death, this relationship is symbolized by her taking his dagger and vowing to continue his search for Sauron.

The episode ends with a key decision for Galadriel in which she chooses to hunt for Sauron rather than enter Valinor to live in peace. Tolkien did not explain why Galadriel chose to remain in Middle-earth in his writings, but he considered several reasons including her pride, choosing to remain with her husband Celeborn, or being banned from Valinor for an unknown reason. This gave the writers leeway to create their own reason, which is Galadriel's choice to continue Finrod's hunt for Sauron. Clark said Galadriel has a feeling of hiraeth, a Welsh word meaning "a yearning and longing", in wanting to finish "what she was meant to do". At the same time as her decision, "The Stranger" crashes in a meteor. The showrunners said he lands "quite literally in [the Harfoots'] backyard", and executive producer Lindsey Weber added that this moment was one of their foundational ideas for the series. Payne and McKay felt it was a momentous enough event to unite the different storylines, despite the major characters being spread across Middle-earth; they all watch the meteor from their own locations.

=== Casting ===
The season's cast includes Robert Aramayo as Elrond, Nazanin Boniadi as Bronwyn, Morfydd Clark as Galadriel, Ismael Cruz Córdova as Arondir, Charles Edwards as Celebrimbor, Lenny Henry as Sadoc Burrows, Markella Kavenagh as Elanor "Nori" Brandyfoot, Tyroe Muhafidin as Theo, Megan Richards as Poppy Proudfellow, Dylan Smith as Largo Brandyfoot, Benjamin Walker as Gil-galad, Daniel Weyman as the Stranger, and Sara Zwangobani as Marigold Brandyfoot. Also starring in the episode are Amelie Child-Villiers as young Galadriel, Will Fletcher as Finrod, Fabian McCallum as Thondir, Kip Chapman as Rían, Thusitha Jayasundera as Malva, Maxine Cunliffe as Vilma, Beau Cassidy as Dilly Brandyfoot, Geoff Morrell as Waldreg, Peter Tait as Tredwill, Ian Blackburn as Rowan, Augustus Prew as Médhor, and Simon Merrells as Revion. Sophia Nomvete, who portrays the Dwarf princess Disa in the series, gave birth during the casting process. Her newborn daughter makes an uncredited cameo appearance in this episode as a young Harfoot.

=== Design ===
Rick Heinrichs was hired as production designer for the series before Bayona joined the project. Ramsey Avery was hired to replace Heinrichs around the end of August 2019. Avery said he was hired because most of what had been done initially "wasn't working", and he had to "start from scratch" and work quickly to be ready for filming. Heinrichs is credited as production designer for the first two episodes alongside Avery. One of the "guideposts" Avery was given when he joined the series was for each Middle-earth culture to be easily identifiable; a "war room" was assembled where the design language for each culture was defined, including for the Elves, Low Men, and Harfoots. Dialect coach Leith McPherson, returning from the Hobbit films, established different dialects for each culture, including Southern English for Elves, Northern English for the Southlanders, and Irish for Harfoots. Daniel Reeve, who was responsible for calligraphy and maps on the films, returned to do the same for the series and also to invent new writing systems for some of the cultures.

Bayona initially oversaw design work at home in Barcelona from September to October 2019. He asked for at least one piece of concept art for every scene in his episodes, totaling around 150 pieces of art, which Avery said was a "tremendous amount" to produce but created a basis for the whole series. He prioritized the designs for the first episode to ensure they would be ready for filming. Avery oversaw the concept artists while also beginning work on the initial sets. New Zealand supervising art director Jules Cook focused on the Southlands and Harfoot sets while another supervising art director, Don Macauley, was brought in to work with New Zealand art director Jill Cormack on the Elvish sets. The northern wasteland of Forodwaith was another environment that was prioritized. The production had use of seven stages and multiple backlot spaces across Auckland Film Studios, Kumeu Film Studios, and Kelly Park Film Studios; Kelly Park is a former equestrian center where they could dig into the dirt floor. Wētā Workshop created props, weapons, and prosthetics for the season.

=== Filming ===
Filming began in early February 2020, under the working title Untitled Amazon Project or simply UAP. Bayona directed the first two episodes, working with his frequent cinematographer Óscar Faura. Location filming took place around Auckland in February. Filming for the first two episodes was expected to continue through May, but was placed on hold in mid-March due to the COVID-19 pandemic. The majority of filming for the first two episodes was reportedly completed by then. Filming was allowed to resume in early May under new safety guidelines from the New Zealand government, but the production decided to segue into an extended filming break that had been planned for after the first two episodes were completed. Filming resumed on September 28, and Bayona completed his episodes by December 23. The director felt like he was making a feature film rather than two television episodes. He was originally supposed to be in New Zealand for nine months for the project, but because of the pandemic he was ultimately living there for a year and a half.

Vic Armstrong supervised the action sequences and was lead second unit director. It was important to Bayona that the fight with the Snow-troll feature Clark doing her own stunts, which Clark said was easier than some other sequences because she was fighting a creature that did not exist. She described Galadriel's fighting style as being "scrappier" than the other Elves, indicating that the character is losing the "elegance and regalness" of an Elf. For the moment where Galadriel jumps off a sword to kill the Troll, Clark was in a wire rig that was counterbalanced by a member of the stunt team. The latter jumped off a ladder to make Clark go higher and further than she otherwise could. Bayona took inspiration for the sequence where the Elves climb up a frozen waterfall from the film The Mission (1986), which Armstrong worked on. A part of the waterfall was created practically out of wax and resin for filming. The origami boat that young Galadriel makes during the opening flashback was created by the series' practical effects team and filmed for real. The production spent several days planning out the introduction sequence for the Harfoots, camouflaging the around 20 different wagons and then choreographing the reveal of the characters, their wagons, and their belongings. The meteor crater at the end of the episode was made to look like an eye, a symbol that is associated with Sauron, to set-up a mystery for the season: is the Stranger Sauron, is he related to Sauron, or is he opposed to Sauron?

=== Visual effects ===
Concept art of the Snow-troll by illustrator John Howe

Visual effects for the episode were created by Industrial Light & Magic (ILM), Wētā FX, Method Studios, Rodeo FX, Cause and FX, Atomic Arts, and Cantina Creative. The different vendors were overseen by visual effects supervisor Jason Smith. ILM was responsible for the ocean effects throughout the season. Rodeo handled much of the Harfoot storyline, including environment augmentation, scale work, and fire and magic effects. Cantina Creative created transitions between locations using a map of Tolkien's world.

Wētā returned from Jackson's films to work on the series. The company was responsible for the episode's prologue, the Forodwaith sequence, and the watchtower Ostirith in the Southlands. In-house visual effects supervisor Ken McGaugh said the biggest challenge of the prologue was the large number of Elves and Orcs that appear in the battle sequences, along with the addition of Fell beasts and Great Eagles flying above the battlefield which Wētā brought back from the films. A wide shot of Tirion, a city in Valinor, was one of the first visual effects shots worked on for the series. McKay felt the completed shot was "pretty spectacular", and it became the first image to be released for the project. Wētā based their digital environment for the frozen waterfall on Bowen Falls and the valley below Castle Mount in Milford Sound. A real frozen waterfall at Wye Creek near Queenstown was filmed as reference, just two weeks before it melted.

The abandoned fortress Durnost in Forodwaith and the Snow-troll that lives there were also created by Wētā. Smith said they considered questions such as "Why is that Troll there? What does he do? How healthy or not is he? How old is he? How long has he been there?" They felt the Troll would be still for long periods of time, allowing ice to form that would crack once it moves. The face and head were designed by Howe, who did six or seven sketches of the Troll. He said the design came from various inspirations including his work on other Trolls for the films. Another creature that is seen in the episode is Tolkien's tree-like Ents, with several shown to be watching the meteor in the final sequence.

=== Music ===
Musicians Janet Roddick, David Donaldson, and Steve Roche, who form the group Plan 9, and their collaborator David Long returned from the films to provide music during filming. Composer Bear McCreary began work in July 2021, and started by composing the main themes for the series. He wrote an "anthem" for each culture and then created individual character themes that relate to their culture's music in different ways. The first episode's score introduces several of these: "Valinor", which represents all Elves, with themes for Galadriel and Elrond; a main theme for the Southlands and a love theme for Bronwyn and Arondir; a general Harfoot theme as well as a separate theme for Nori Brandyfoot; and Sauron's theme, which also represents Morgoth in the prologue. Another theme, titled "Where the Shadows Lie", is heard during the end credits. This represents the Rings of Power and related elements and was primarily composed for the season finale. A chord progression from the theme is heard earlier in the episode over the opening title card and again when Celebrimbor is introduced.

The first version of the episode McCreary received began with four seconds of black screen before Galadriel's opening narration begins. He wanted to use these initial moments to introduce the Valinor theme but found that four seconds was not long enough. The showrunners agreed to extend this to 17 seconds. When the Elves sail to Valinor in the episode, they sing a song "whose memory [all Elves] carry". McCreary wanted this song to be the Valinor theme, but by the time he was hired the scene had already been filmed with the actors singing a different song written by Plan 9. McCreary liked that song but did not think it would work as a theme for Valinor in the score. To solve this, McCreary spent a month working with the editors to select specific takes where the actors' mouth movements matched to the Elvish lyrics of his Valinor theme, which he also adjusted for the scene. McCreary chose to use Elrond's theme for the introductions of Lindon and High King Gil-galad. He did this so the audience would focus on Elrond in those scenes. McCreary wrote a choral piece in Elvish that is heard during the ceremony where Gil-galad proclaims the war to be over; he felt this sounded like it was being sung by an off-screen choir in Lindon. The composer had a specific theme for Gil-galad planned but did not use it during the first season. When the meteor appears at the end of the episode, McCreary added a clarinet that "slices through the soundtrack from its lowest to highest register". This is a technique he borrowed from composer Igor Stravinsky that was also used by film composers such as John Williams and Jerry Goldsmith. McCreary was pleased that the showrunners appreciated the addition considering some modern filmmakers are against the use of woodwind instruments.

The Lord of the Rings: The Rings of Power (Season One, Episode One: A Shadow of the Past – Amazon Original Series Soundtrack)

Film score by Bear McCreary
- Released: September 1, 2022
- Genres: Orchestra; choir; world
- Length: 55:49
- Languages: English; Constructed languages
- Labels: Amazon; Mondo

Bear McCreary chronology
The Lord of the Rings: The Rings of Power (Season One) (2022)	A Shadow of the Past (2022)	Adrift (2022)

A soundtrack album featuring McCreary's score for the episode was released digitally on the streaming service Amazon Music on September 1, 2022. McCreary said the album contained "virtually every second of score" from the episode. It was added to other music streaming services after the full first season was released. A CD featuring the episode's music is included in a limited edition box set collection for the season from Mondo, Amazon Music, and McCreary's label Sparks & Shadows. The box set was released on April 26, 2024, and includes a journal written by McCreary which details the creation of the episode's score. All music was composed by Bear McCreary:

Track listing
No.	Title	Length
1.	"Prologue"	7:26
2.	"Forodwaith"	8:38
3.	"Beyond Our Wandering"	7:17
4.	"Return to Lindon"	3:30
5.	"Gil-galad's Gift"	6:16
6.	"The Southlands"	9:35
7.	"Strange Skies"	3:55
8.	"The Boat and the Crater"	6:08
9.	"Where the Shadows Lie – Instrumental"	3:04
Total length:		55:49

== Release ==
The first two episodes premiered on the streaming service Amazon Prime Video on September 1, 2022. They were released at the same time around the world, in more than 240 countries and territories. For two weeks leading up to the second season's premiere on August 29, 2024, the first season was made available for free on the streaming service Samsung TV Plus in the US, Canada, Brazil, the United Kingdom, and Germany.

Ahead of the third season's release in November 2026, a home media release for the first two seasons was announced. Each release features the eight episodes of the respective season along with behind-the-scenes content. They were released on 4K Ultra HD, Blu-ray, and DVD on November 3, and in limited edition 4K UHD SteelBook—with Amazon exclusive collectable art cards—on December 1.

== Reception ==
=== Viewership ===
Amazon announced that The Rings of Power had been watched by 25 million viewers globally in the first 24 hours that the first two episodes were available on Prime Video. The company stated that this was the biggest premiere ever for the service. It did not specify how much of an episode a user needed to watch to count as a viewer. Analytics company Samba TV, which gathers viewership data from certain smart TVs and content providers, reported that 1.8 million US households watched the first episode within four days of its release. Whip Media, which tracks viewership data for the 21 million worldwide users of its TV Time app, calculated that for the week ending September 4, three days after the episode's debut, it was the second-highest original streaming series for US viewership. Nielsen Media Research, which records streaming viewership on US television screens, estimated that The Rings of Power was watched for a combined 1.25 billion minutes during its first four days. This is around 12.6 million viewers, the most for any streaming series or film for the week ending September 4.

=== Critical response ===
On review aggregator Rotten Tomatoes, 84% of 161 critics gave the episode a positive review and the average of rated reviews was 7.3 out of 10. The critics consensus reads, "Forging its claim with astounding production value, vast scope and a dense—arguably impenetrable—amount of lore, 'A Shadow of the Past' suggests that this ambitious expansion of Tolkien's opus has a bright future." Multiple publications said the first two episodes received generally positive reviews, with particular praise for the visuals and high production value. Some reviewers were skeptical whether the storytelling and slow pacing justified the large budget.

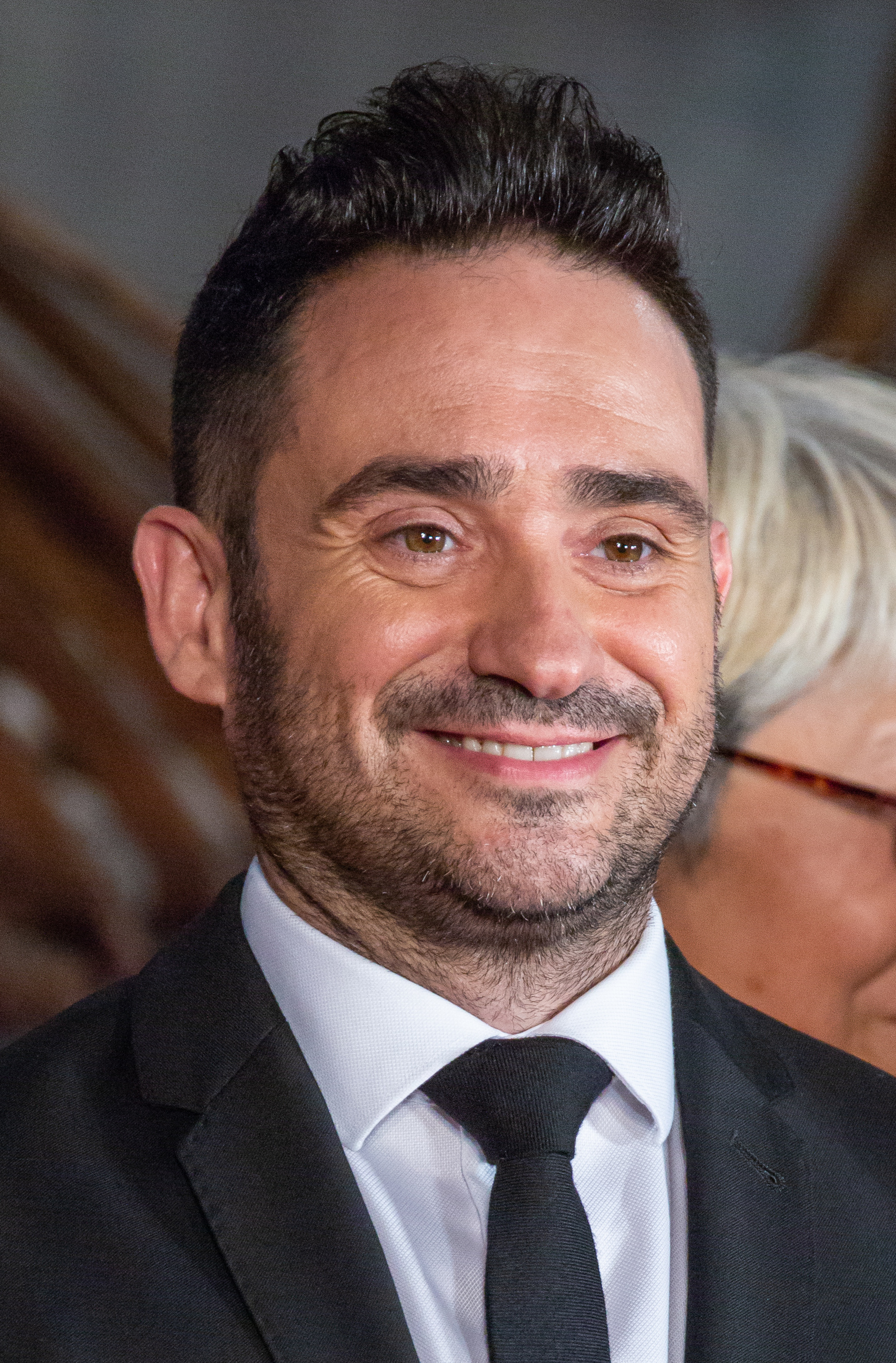
The episode's visuals and high production value were praised. Pictured is director J. A. Bayona.

Alex Welch at Inverse said the budget was on screen with "some of the most awe-inspiring images that have ever been brought to life on" television, and he thought Bayona's visuals was better than recent Hollywood blockbuster films. Welch highlighted the vibrant color palette and was impressed that the series' depiction of Middle-earth felt like it could evolve into Jackson's. Andy Welch of The Guardian also praised the visuals, comparing them positively to the films of Marvel Studios. Dave Nemetz graded the first two episodes an 'A-' for TVLine and said they were "a gorgeously immersive and grandly ambitious spectacle packed with stunning imagery and compelling plot threads". He highlighted the visuals, McCreary's score, the humanity of the characters, and the Snow-troll fight. Nemetz said the series "captures the same sense of awe we felt while watching the Lord of the Rings movies—one we don't often get to experience on the small screen". Writing for Screen Rant, Mae Abdulbaki praised the scope and visuals, highlighted Faura's cinematography, and said McCreary's score elevated the action sequences and brought "warmth to calmer, more heartwarming scenes". Juliette Harrisson of Den of Geek gave the first two episodes four out of five stars. She praised the costume and production design, visual effects, and acting. Keith Phipps, writing for Vulture, thought it was the right move for the visuals to align with Jackson's films. Reviewing the first two episodes for RogerEbert.com, Clint Worthington said they were gorgeous but thought the showrunners were trying to "have their cake and eat it too" by distancing the series from Jackson's films while still trying to be visually consistent with them.

Harrisson, writing for Den of Geek, said the drawback of the first two episodes was their focus on set-up and world-building. She thought the pacing of the first episode was particularly slow, though it meant information was given to the audience at an understandable pace. She was left feeling intrigued and excited to watch more. Alex Stedman at IGN said the episode was a 7 out of 10, lower than the second episode due to the large amount of exposition, but still felt it was a strong foundation for the series. Welch of The Guardian was excited by the series' start, though he agreed that the first episode "took a while to get going" with its large amount of world-building. Phipps gave the episode four out of five stars and called it a compelling and promising start, despite the large amount of exposition and set-up required. For Screen Rant, Abdulbaki agreed that the series "takes a while... to get going" with the first episode's focus on introducing various characters and conflicts. Worthington said the slow pacing was the major failing of the first episode, calling it a "somewhat dry, derivative prelude, filled with endless scenes of politicking and Elves droning on against green screens or elegantly-furnished conference rooms". Daniel Fienberg of The Hollywood Reporter said the series had potential, and held up better than he expected. He said the first episode was focused on world-building and generally met the grand scope it was aiming for, though he struggled with some of the exposition and longer dialogue scenes. Welch at Inverse was uncertain whether the series could live up to the "narrative elegance" of the films, and thought the lack of a clear villain gave the first two episodes "an unfortunate sense of waywardness".

Lacy Baugher Milas of Paste thought the first two episodes did a good job of introducing the many characters. Milas acknowledged that some Tolkien fans may take issue with changes to his lore, but she appreciated some of these decisions such as the depiction of Galadriel and inclusion of more female characters. Stedman at IGN felt the portrayal of Galadriel was key to the success of the series and praised Clark as an "instant star". Welch of The Guardian also praised Clark's performance. In his review for RogerEbert.com, Worthington was positive about the performances of Clark and Aramayo, as well as the "well-conceptualized" action sequence where Galadriel fights the Snow-troll. The Hollywood Reporter's Fienberg highlighted the performances of Clark and Aramayo, but disliked watching their characters "make pronouncements at each other".

=== Accolades ===
Accolades received by The Lord of the Rings: The Rings of Power episode "A Shadow of the Past"
Award	Date of ceremony	Category	Recipient(s)	Result	Ref.
Camerimage	November 19, 2022	Best Episode	J. A. Bayona and Óscar Faura	Nominated	
Costume Designers Guild Awards	February 27, 2023	Excellence in Sci-Fi/Fantasy Television	Kate Hawley	Nominated	
Primetime Creative Arts Emmy Awards	January 7, 2024	Outstanding Fantasy/Sci-Fi Costumes	Kate Hawley, Libby Dempster, Lucy McLay, Jaindra Watson, Pip Lingard, and Jenny Rushton	Nominated	

== Companion media ==
An episode of the official aftershow Deadline's Inside the Ring: LOTR: The Rings of Power for "A Shadow of the Past" was released on September 3, 2022. Hosted by Deadline Hollywood's Dominic Patten and Anthony D'Alessandro, it features exclusive "footage and insights" for the episode, plus interviews with cast members Clark, Aramayo, Walker, and Edwards, as well as executive producers McKay, Payne, and Weber. On October 14, The Official The Lord of the Rings: The Rings of Power Podcast was released on Amazon Music. Hosted by actress Felicia Day, the first episode is dedicated to "A Shadow of the Past" and features Clark, Payne, and McKay. On November 21, a bonus segment featuring behind-the-scenes footage from the episode was added to Prime Video's X-Ray feature as part of a series titled "The Making of The Rings of Power".
