= Adrift (The Lord of the Rings: The Rings of Power) =

- The Lord of the Rings: The Rings of Power episode
- Cover art for the episode's soundtrack album
- Episode no.: Season 1 Episode 2
- Directed by: J. A. Bayona
- Written by: Gennifer Hutchison
- Cinematography by: Óscar Faura
- Editing by: Bernat Vilaplana; Jaume Martí
- Original release date: September 1, 2022
- Running time: 67 minutes

Additional cast
- Thusitha Jayasundera as Malva; Maxine Cunliffe as Vilma; Berynn Schwerdt as Eamon; Virginie Laverdure as Abigail; Jane Montgomery Griffiths as Astrid; Geoff Morrell as Waldreg; Peter Tait as Tredwill; Peter Mullan as Durin III

Episode chronology
← Previous "A Shadow of the Past"	Next → "Adar"
- The Lord of the Rings: The Rings of Power season 1

"Adrift" is the second episode of the first season of the American fantasy television series The Lord of the Rings: The Rings of Power, which is based on J. R. R. Tolkien's history of Middle-earth. It was written by Gennifer Hutchison and directed by J. A. Bayona.

The series is set thousands of years before Tolkien's novel The Lord of the Rings (1954–55), during the Second Age of Middle-earth. This episode introduces one of the story's key cultures: the Dwarves. Each culture was defined through designs, dialects, and music, and introduced at a time of change for their people. Filming for the first season began in New Zealand in February 2020, but was placed on hold in March due to the COVID-19 pandemic. Production resumed in September and wrapped for the first two episodes by the end of December. Ocean sequences were filmed in large water tanks, with Olympic swimmer Trent Bray teaching the actors to swim and free dive.

"Adrift" premiered on the streaming service Amazon Prime Video on September 1, 2022, with the first episode. They had the most viewers of any Prime Video premiere within 24 hours. Reviews were generally positive, with praise for the visuals and high production value but skepticism regarding the storytelling and slow pacing. The episode received two nominations at the 21st Visual Effects Society Awards for its depiction of the Dwarven kingdom of Khazad-dûm and the ocean storm sequence.

== Background ==
The Lord of the Rings: The Rings of Power is based on J. R. R. Tolkien's history of Middle-earth. It is set thousands of years before his novels The Hobbit (1937) and The Lord of the Rings (1954–55). While it is contractually not a continuation of Peter Jackson's The Lord of the Rings (2001–2003) and The Hobbit (2012–2014) film trilogies, it is intended to be visually consistent with them, and the first season was produced in New Zealand like Jackson's films were. J. D. Payne and Patrick McKay were hired to develop the series and serve as its showrunners, with J. A. Bayona set to direct the first two episodes of the first season.

The series covers the major events of Middle-earth's Second Age. Amazon did not acquire the rights to Tolkien's main Second Age writings, so the writers identified references to the period in The Hobbit, The Lord of the Rings, and the latter's appendices, and created a story that bridges those passages. The Second Age begins after the defeat of the "Dark Lord" Morgoth, when his army of Orcs are scattered and his lieutenant Sauron is in hiding. The large cast of characters includes Elves, Dwarves, Men, and Harfoots, the last being precursors to the diminutive Hobbits from The Hobbit and The Lord of the Rings.

== Plot ==
Young Harfoots Nori Brandyfoot and Poppy Proudfellow find a strange man inside a meteor crater and move him to a makeshift shelter. Nori gives him food and learns that he does not speak their language. Nori and Poppy later find the Stranger looking at the stars and using magic to arrange fireflies into a constellation that Nori does not recognize. When he stops using the magic, the fireflies all die.

In the Southlands of Middle-earth, the Elf Arondir and human healer Bronwyn find no survivors or bodies in the ruined village of Hordern. Arondir enters a tunnel below the village and is captured. Bronwyn returns to the village of Tirharad to warn her neighbors, but they dismiss her. At home she finds her son Theo hiding from an Orc that has burst from beneath the floorboards. Bronwyn and Theo kill the Orc and use its head to convince the other villagers to flee to the nearby Elvish tower Ostirith. Theo brings the broken sword he found, which draws power from a bleeding wound.

At the Elven realm of Eregion, Celebrimbor tells Elrond that he is building a powerful forge and requires a workforce that High King Gil-galad cannot provide. Elrond suggests they travel to the nearby Dwarven realm of Khazad-dûm to ask his old friend Prince Durin IV for help. Elrond is surprised to find that he is not welcome and invokes the rite of sigin-tarâg, a rock-breaking contest between himself and Durin. Elrond loses and is banished from all Dwarf lands. As Durin escorts him out, Elrond learns that Durin is angry because Elrond has not visited in 20 years, missing Durin's wedding to Disa and the births of their children. Elrond apologizes to Durin and Disa, and the latter encourages the pair to make up. Durin agrees to relay Elrond's proposal to King Durin III, who is concerned that Elrond's arrival relates to the Dwarves' secret new discovery.

Swimming back to Middle-earth, Galadriel encounters a raft of stranded humans escaping from a sea monster called "The Worm". The Worm attacks the raft, leaving only Galadriel and one of the Men alive. He introduces himself as Halbrand of the Southlands and says he is escaping from Orcs. They are caught in a storm and Halbrand saves Galadriel from drowning. The next morning, the pair are found by a passing ship.

== Production ==
=== Writing ===
"Adrift" was written by Gennifer Hutchison. The season introduces the Second Age and its major heroic characters, with each group being introduced at "a time of enormous change in their worlds" which the showrunners hoped would make the series more dramatic. The Dwarves "are in the middle of a great change in their society" and Elrond's arrival upends their "established order". The showrunners said the series was an opportunity to show Khazad-dûm in its full glory, in contrast with the desolate ruin that it is in The Lord of the Rings. The episode also introduces the first female Dwarf with a prominent role in a Tolkien adaptation, Disa, who they intended to reflect all the strengths of Tolkien's male Dwarves. They wanted Disa and Durin IV's relationship to be an example of a healthy marriage. Durin actor Owain Arthur said his character's decision to forgive Elrond showed how deep the friendship is between the pair, and said it was a "true Durin trait" that he remained angry for the rest of the episode because he was angry with himself for forgiving Elrond.

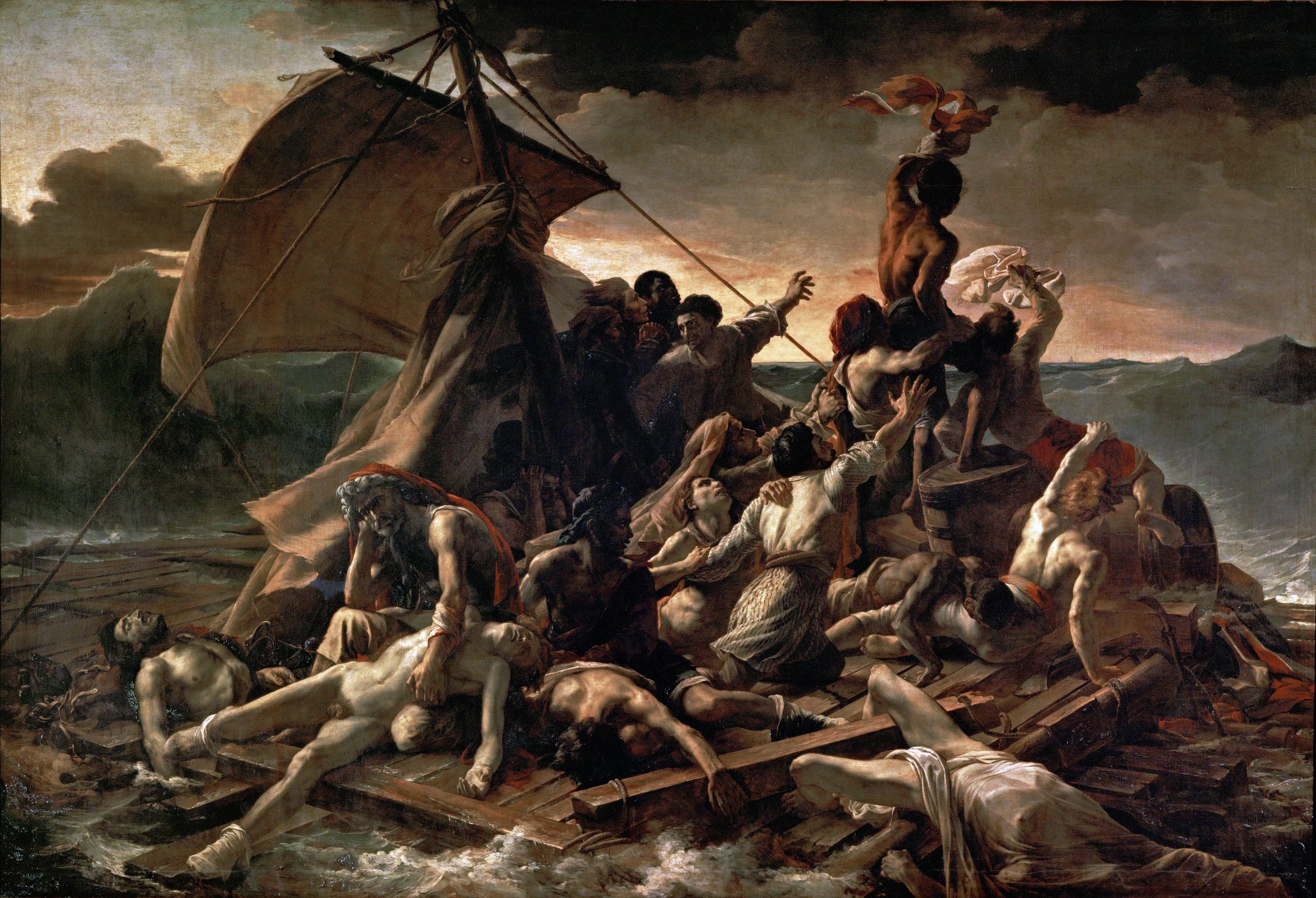
The Raft of the Medusa by Théodore Géricault inspired the scene where Galadriel comes across a raft of survivors in the ocean.

After Galadriel's "leap of faith" into the ocean at the end of the first episode, "A Shadow of the Past", she is forced to swim back to Middle-earth. The showrunners envisioned the episode as a survival story and took inspiration from the film Lawrence of Arabia (1962), although the episode is set in a ocean rather than a desert. Galadriel coming across a raft of survivors was inspired by the painting The Raft of the Medusa (1818–19) by Théodore Géricault. The showrunners felt Galadriel's meeting with new human character Halbrand on the raft was in-line with other chance meetings in Tolkien's writings. They enjoyed the ambiguity of whether this is truly an accidental meeting or if other forces are at play. Halbrand actor Charlie Vickers said his character initially trusts Galadriel out of his survival instinct and becomes fascinated with her, leading to him saving her life during the storm sequence.

The scene where Bronwyn and Theo fight an Orc in their kitchen was originally written for the third episode. Bayona loved the scene so much that he convinced the showrunners to move it to the second episode so he could direct it. The episode also explores the Stranger who falls from the sky at the end of the first episode and now interacts with the young Harfoots Nori Brandyfoot and Poppy Proudfellow. McKay compared the Stranger to the title characters of the films E.T. the Extra-Terrestrial (1982) and The Iron Giant (1999), being a mysterious character who talks in an unknown language and could be there "for good or ill". The showrunners took inspiration from the films of Buster Keaton and other silent films for the character, and gave actor Daniel Weyman "theater exercises" during his audition to see how he communicated emotions without dialogue.

=== Casting ===
The season's cast includes Robert Aramayo as Elrond, Owain Arthur as Durin IV, Nazanin Boniadi as Bronwyn, Morfydd Clark as Galadriel, Ismael Cruz Córdova as Arondir, Charles Edwards as Celebrimbor, Lenny Henry as Sadoc Burrows, Markella Kavenagh as Elanor "Nori" Brandyfoot, Tyroe Muhafidin as Theo, Sophia Nomvete as Disa, Megan Richards as Poppy Proudfellow, Dylan Smith as Largo Brandyfoot, Charlie Vickers as Halbrand, Daniel Weyman as the Stranger, and Sara Zwangobani as Marigold Brandyfoot. Also starring in the episode are Thusitha Jayasundera as Malva, Maxine Cunliffe as Vilma, Berynn Schwerdt as Eamon, Virginie Laverdure as Abigail, Jane Montgomery Griffiths as Astrid, Geoff Morrell as Waldreg, Peter Tait as Tredwill, and Peter Mullan as Durin III. Nathan Mennis plays the unnamed Orc in the episode.

=== Design ===
Rick Heinrichs was hired as production designer before Bayona joined the series. Ramsey Avery was hired to replace Heinrichs around the end of August 2019. Avery said he was hired because most of what had been done initially "wasn't working", and he had to "start from scratch" and work quickly to be ready for filming. Heinrichs is credited as production designer for the first two episodes alongside Avery. One of the "guideposts" Avery was given when he joined the series was for each Middle-earth culture to be easily identifiable; a "war room" was assembled where the design language for each culture was defined, including for the Dwarves. Dialect coach Leith McPherson, returning from the Hobbit films, used Scottish accents for the Dwarves. Daniel Reeve, who was responsible for calligraphy and maps on the films, returned to do the same.

Bayona initially oversaw design work at home in Barcelona from September to October 2019. He asked for at least one piece of concept art for every scene in his episodes, totaling around 150 pieces of art, which Avery said was a "tremendous amount" to produce but created a basis for the whole series. He prioritized the designs for the first episode to ensure they would be ready for filming. Avery oversaw the concept artists while also beginning work on the initial sets.While the series' supervising art directors and New Zealand art team worked on the sets needed for the first episode, Avery worked with United States art director Iain McFadyen and the Los Angeles art team to plan the Dwarvish sets for the second episode. The production had use of seven stages and multiple backlot spaces across Auckland Film Studios, Kumeu Film Studios, and Kelly Park Film Studios; Kelly Park is a former equestrian center where they could dig into the dirt floor. Wētā Workshop created props, weapons, and prosthetics for the season.

Kate Hawley was the costume designer for the season. The undergarment that Galadriel wears in this episode went through 70 different iterations to achieve the desired underwater visuals, and to create a version that would not be damaged by chlorine during filming. It was originally more ornate, with embroidery and pearls, but this was pared back due to the number of test versions that were being created.

=== Filming ===
Filming began in early February 2020, under the working title Untitled Amazon Project or simply UAP. Bayona directed the first two episodes, working with his frequent cinematographer Óscar Faura. Location filming took place around Auckland in February. Filming for the first two episodes was expected to continue through May, but was placed on hold in mid-March due to the COVID-19 pandemic. The majority of filming for the first two episodes was reportedly completed by then. Filming was allowed to resume in early May under new safety guidelines from the New Zealand government, but the production decided to segue into an extended filming break that had been planned for after the first two episodes were completed. Filming resumed on September 28, and Bayona completed his episodes by December 23. The director felt like he was making a feature film rather than two television episodes. He was originally supposed to be in New Zealand for nine months for the project, but because of the pandemic he was ultimately living there for a year and a half.

Filming for the episode's ocean sequences took place in water tanks, including this large outdoor tank.

The ocean sequences, including dialogue scenes on the raft, the storm, and the underwater scene, were filmed over six weeks to two months. This followed two months of training for Clark and Vickers, who were taught to "properly swim", free dive, and hold their breath for minutes at a time by Olympic swimmer Trent Bray. The scenes were filmed in two water tanks: an outdoor tank that was 10 feet (3.0 m) deep and held 2.5 million liters of water; and a smaller dive tank that was 16 feet (4.9 m) deep and held 1.2 million liters or water. The outdoor tank was covered by a retractable roof that Bayona and Faura requested, based on a similar set-up that they used on the film The Impossible (2012). Several diggers were used to create waves in the tank, which was big enough that some shots required no or minimal additions from the visual effects team. The raft was controlled by a gimbal to prevent it from drifting during filming. Clark and Vickers were often on the raft in the middle of the tank for multiple takes. The crew would send food to them on a boat between some takes. Some of the scenes were filmed at night, for which Clark and Vickers kept warm during filming breaks in a Jacuzzi on set. The storm sequence has 195 shots and took more than three weeks to film across both water tanks. The sequence where the characters are attacked by a sea monster was mostly filmed in the smaller dive tank. The final scene of the episode, in which Galadriel and Halbrand are found by a Númenórean ship and the shadow of a sailor is cast on their raft, is a direct reference to Lawrence of Arabia.

The showrunners initially intended to film some Khazad-dûm scenes in the Waitomo Caves, but this proved to be impractical. Exteriors for Khazad-dûm were filmed on location, and on a set that was built on the backlot at Kumeu Film Studios. A lot of the Dwarvish sets were built twice at different scales for filming with Dwarf and Elf characters. Other techniques were also used to make the Dwarf actors appear smaller than the rest of the cast, including oversized props and prosthetics, and actors looking over the heads of their scene partners. Producer Ron Ames said they tried to have the cast members looking at each other whenever possible to prioritize the performances. Executive producer Lindsey Weber said these technical requirements made the rock-breaking competition between Elrond and Durin one of the most complicated sequences in the season to create. It took three days to film, using repeated camera movements to capture each shot multiple times, with the different actors filmed at the correct scale. Bayona was concerned about using motion control photography to create repeated camera movements because he felt this approach created "rigid" shots that were noticeable to audiences. He asked the visual effects team if they could use hand-held cameras for motion control shots, and the team developed a system for the series that would replicate the movement of a hand-held shot. The showrunners wanted Durin and Disa to have a family but portraying Dwarvish children posed some production issues: it would be difficult to depict the children at the correct height, and the heavy prosthetics required would take too long to apply considering child actors are only allowed to work for limited hours each day. To solve these issues, Hawley suggested that the children be filmed running around wearing large Dwarvish helmets that hide their faces and most of their bodies.

Vic Armstrong supervised the action sequences and was lead second unit director. Bayona storyboarded the complete Orc fight scene and sent his plans to Armstrong, who worked to translate those plans into practical choreography. The showrunners felt some audience members would see Orcs as "video game characters", based on their appearances in the films, and wanted the first up-close interaction with one in the series to disprove this by showing that Orcs are scary and difficult to kill. They were inspired by Alfred Hitchcock's film Torn Curtain (1966) which features an extended fight scene where two characters struggle to kill a man in a kitchen. McKay explained: "They're stabbing him, they're shoving his head in the oven, and it just goes on and on and on. We were like, what if that was an Orc? And instead of Paul Newman, it's a mom and her kid?" The scene is around two minutes long and was filmed over two weeks. Supervising movement coach Lara Fischel-Chisholm worked with Mennis to create unpredictable movements for the Orc.

=== Visual effects ===
Visual effects for the episode were created by Industrial Light & Magic (ILM), Wētā FX, Method Studios, Rodeo FX, Rising Sun Pictures, Cause and FX, Atomic Arts, and Cantina Creative. The different vendors were overseen by visual effects supervisor Jason Smith. Rodeo handled much of the Harfoot storyline, including environment augmentation, scale work, and fire and magic effects. They added digital movements to the snails that Nori and the Stranger eat, as the on-set props were made of chocolate and candy. Wētā FX created the Khazad-dûm environment, and also enhanced the prosthetics that were used for the Orc. Smith explained that they made the arms look thinner to give him a "creepier feel", and adjusted the lips and tongue to make it look like the tongue is "too big for the mouth and is infected with a black, hairy growth... you can see the creature gagging on its own tongue." Rising Sun worked on the rock-breaking sequence, and Cantina Creative created transitions between locations using a map of Tolkien's world.

ILM worked on the ocean sequences, combining footage from the water tanks with aerial photography from New Zealand's coastline and oceans that Smith had captured at the start of production. The company also provided additional water effects and waves that could not be captured in the tanks, due to their size or because of actor safety, creating "terrifying and violently strong" waves. Ames said the result was "50/50" in terms of how much water in the shots was practical versus digital. Smith felt the sequences were successful because of ILM's experienced artists and existing tools for water simulations; they developed an "ocean machine" that could generate a specific ocean and sky based on the requirements of each scene. The company also created the sea monster that attacks the characters in the episode, which is called "The Worm". The producers felt that was what Tolkien would have called it. They went through 200 concepts for the creature to explore different ideas for it based on Tolkien's writings. The final design is based on a clay model by concept artist Simon Lee and resembles an eel with the mouth of an anglerfish. Smith highlighted the "pointy, dangerous" fins and a "bony protuberance at the front" that was inspired by dinosaurs. The visual effects team gave the Worm's movements the aggression of a shark. Smith praised the complex model that ILM created for the creature despite it only being partially seen in the episode. He said there was potential for it to be seen more in future seasons.

=== Music ===
Composer Bear McCreary began work in July 2021, and started by composing the main themes for the series. He wrote an "anthem" for each culture and then created individual character themes that relate to their culture's music in different ways. The second episode's score introduces several of these: a theme for Khazad-dûm which represents Dwarvish culture and King Durin III, plus a separate theme for Prince Durin IV; and a theme for the Stranger. Halbrand is represented by the Southlands theme from the first episode. A chord progression from "Where the Shadows Lie", the theme that represents the Rings of Power and related elements in the series, is heard when Durin IV and his father discuss their new discovery. McCreary spent most of a week composing the music for the action sequence where the characters on the raft are attacked by the Worm.

The Lord of the Rings: The Rings of Power (Season One, Episode Two: Adrift – Amazon Original Series Soundtrack)

Film score by Bear McCreary
- Released: September 1, 2022
- Genres: Orchestra; choir; world
- Length: 49:17
- Languages: English; Constructed languages
- Labels: Amazon; Mondo

Bear McCreary chronology
A Shadow of the Past (2022)	Adrift (2022)	Adar (2022)

A soundtrack album featuring McCreary's score for the episode was released digitally on the streaming service Amazon Music on September 1, 2022. McCreary said the album contained "virtually every second of score" from the episode. It was added to other music streaming services after the full first season was released. A CD featuring the episode's music is included in a limited edition box set collection for the season from Mondo, Amazon Music, and McCreary's label Sparks & Shadows. The box set was released on April 26, 2024, and includes a journal written by McCreary which details the creation of the episode's score. All music was composed by Bear McCreary:

Track listing
No.	Title	Length
1.	"Carrying a Giant"	6:27
2.	"Celebrimbor's Ambition"	3:50
3.	"Into Khazad-dûm"	6:07
4.	"Offering Snails"	4:21
5.	"Adrift"	4:28
6.	"Durin and His Family"	3:50
7.	"On the Raft"	5:37
8.	"From Under the Floorboards"	7:17
9.	"Constellation of Fireflies"	5:10
10.	"Bloodthirst"	2:10
Total length:		49:17

== Release ==
The first two episodes premiered on the streaming service Amazon Prime Video on September 1, 2022. They were released at the same time around the world, in more than 240 countries and territories. For two weeks leading up to the second season's premiere on August 29, 2024, the first season was made available for free on the streaming service Samsung TV Plus in the US, Canada, Brazil, the United Kingdom, and Germany.

Ahead of the third season's release in November 2026, a home media release for the first two seasons was announced. Each release features the eight episodes of the respective season along with behind-the-scenes content. They were released on 4K Ultra HD, Blu-ray, and DVD on November 3, and in limited edition 4K UHD SteelBook—with Amazon exclusive collectable art cards—on December 1.

== Reception ==
=== Viewership ===
Amazon announced that The Rings of Power had been watched by 25 million viewers globally in the first 24 hours that the first two episodes were available on Prime Video. The company stated that this was the biggest premiere ever for the service. It did not specify how much of an episode a user needed to watch to count as a viewer. Analytics company Samba TV, which gathers viewership data from certain smart TVs and content providers, reported that 1.3 million US households watched the second episode within four days of its release. Whip Media, which tracks viewership data for the 21 million worldwide users of its TV Time app, calculated that for the week ending September 4, three days after the episode's debut, it was the second-highest original streaming series for US viewership. Nielsen Media Research, which records streaming viewership on US television screens, estimated that The Rings of Power was watched for 1.25 billion minutes during its first four days. This is around 12.6 million viewers, the most for any streaming series or film for the week ending September 4.

=== Critical response ===
On review aggregator Rotten Tomatoes, 86% of 150 critics gave the episode a positive review and the average of rated reviews was 7.4 out of 10. The critics consensus reads, "'Adrift' belies its title and gives The Rings of Power some narrative shape, propelling its adventures forward in intriguing directions while treating fans to a tour of Khazad-dûm in all its glory." Multiple publications said the first two episodes received generally positive reviews, with particular praise for the visuals and high production value. Some reviewers were skeptical whether the storytelling and slow pacing justified the large budget.

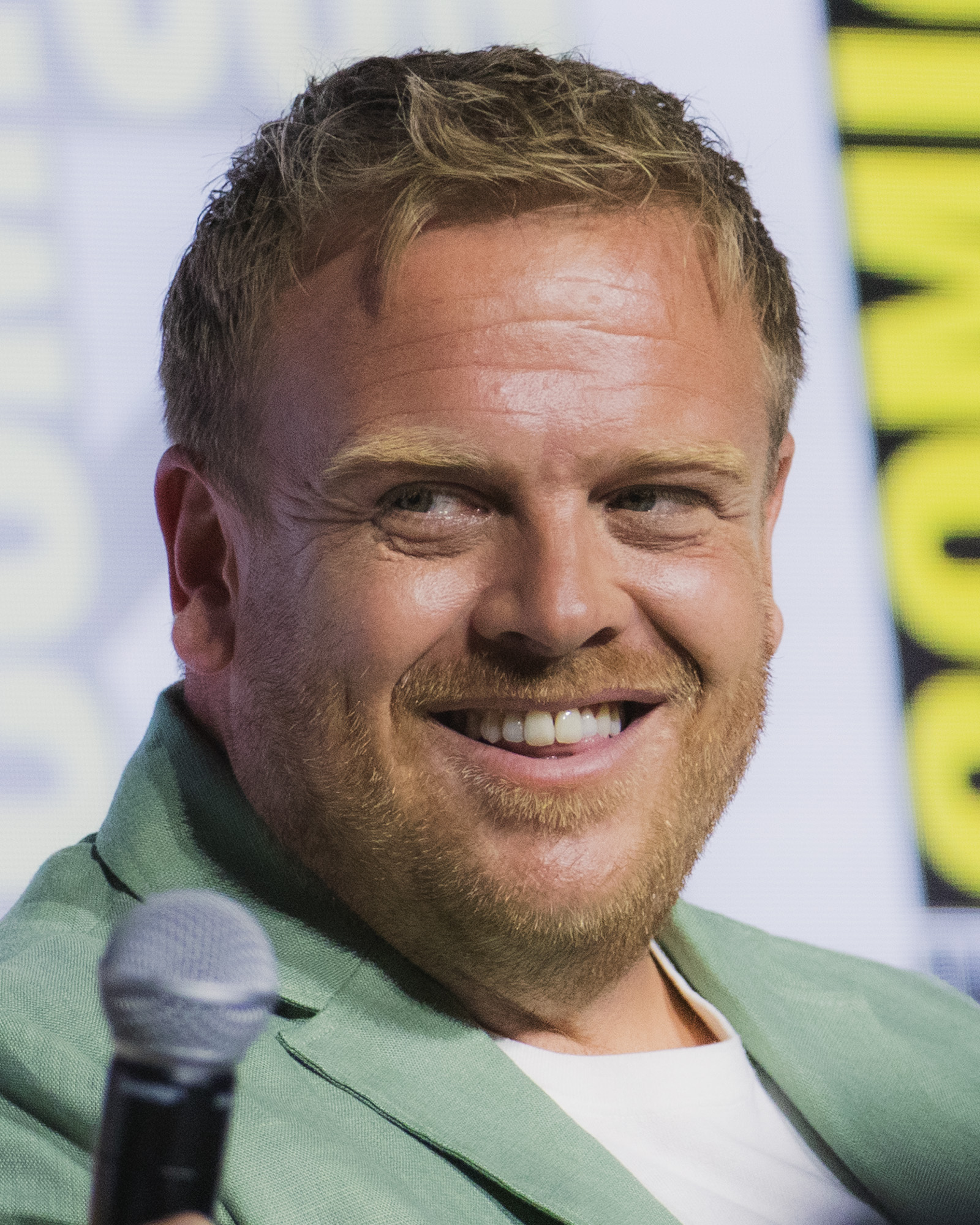
The episode's Dwarven storyline and characters were praised. Pictured is Dwarf actor Owain Arthur.

Daniel Fienberg of The Hollywood Reporter said the story "starts to actually move along" in the second episode and he thought the character groupings and relationships worked much better than in the first. Writing for RogerEbert.com, Clint Worthington similarly said the episode "picks things up considerably" and appreciated spending more time with the Dwarves and Harfoots. He was positive about the performances of Aramayo and Clark. Mae Abdulbaki of Screen Rant said the episode was stronger than the slow-paced first episode, adding dimension to the characters and tension to the conflicts. Dave Nemetz at TVLine graded the first two episodes an 'A-'. He said the second episode was better than the first and expanded on the relationships that were established in the premiere. For IGN, Alex Stedman said the episode was a 9 out of 10, higher than the first episode due to the increased focus on characters and story over exposition and world-building. She particularly highlighted the introduction of the Dwarves and the well-established relationships between Elrond, Durin, and Disa, as well as the episode's humor which Stedman felt was inline with previous Lord of the Rings projects. Andy Welch of The Guardian was excited by the series' start and enjoyed the pacing of the second episode more than the first. Welch said the episode benefited from the inclusion of the Dwarves, particularly enjoying the relationship between Durin and Disa. Alex Welch at Inverse was less positive about the episode, saying the disparate storylines made it feel "frustratingly unwieldy" and wishing the series would focus on the Dwarves over the Harfoots. He praised the performances of Clark and Arthur.

Lacy Baugher Milas of Paste scored the first two episodes 8.6 out of 10. She thought they did a good job of introducing the series' many characters and were confident in their storytelling approach. Juliette Harrisson at Den of Geek gave the first two episodes four out of five stars. She praised the costume and production design, visual effects, and acting, but said the drawback of the episodes was their focus on set-up and world-building. She thought the pacing of the second episode was faster than the first and highlighted the increased action with the Worm and Orc sequences. Welch of The Guardian praised the series' visuals, positively comparing them to those of Jackson's films and the Marvel Cinematic Universe. Worthington said the first two episodes were gorgeous but thought the showrunners were trying to "have their cake and eat it too" by distancing the series from Jackson's films while still trying to make it visually consistent with them. He compared the "well-conceptualized" Orc sequence to the Evil Dead franchise. Abdulbaki of Screen Rant praised the scope, visuals, and McCreary's score, and specifically highlighted Bayona's work on the tunnel chase and kitchen action sequences. Nemetz highlighted the visuals, McCreary's score, and the action sequences with the Worm and the Orc. Keith Phipps, writing for Vulture, gave the episode four out of five stars and called it a strong outing with less exposition than the first episode and more momentum. He praised the action sequence with the Orc for making the creature scary in a one-on-one scene compared to the large number seen in Jackson's films. The Hollywood Reporter's Fienberg credited Bayona with bringing the suspenseful directing style of his films to the episode's action sequences.

=== Accolades ===
Accolades received by the The Lord of the Rings: The Rings of Power episode "Adrift"
Award	Date of ceremony	Category	Recipient(s)	Result	Ref.
Visual Effects Society Awards	February 15, 2023	Outstanding Created Environment in an Episode, Commercial, or Real-Time Project	James Ogle, Péter Bujdosó, Lon Krung, and Shweta Bhatnagar (for Khazad-dûm)	Nominated	
Visual Effects Society Awards	February 15, 2023	Outstanding Special (Practical) Effects in a Photoreal or Animated Project	Dean Clarke, Oliver Gee, Eliot Naimie, and Mark Robson (for Middle-earth Storm)	Nominated	

== Companion media ==
An episode of the official aftershow Deadline's Inside the Ring: LOTR: The Rings of Power for "Adrift" was released on September 3, 2022. Hosted by Deadline Hollywood's Dominic Patten and Anthony D'Alessandro, it features exclusive "footage and insights" for the episode, plus interviews with cast members Nomvette, Arthur, Kavenagh, Richards, Weyman, Zwangobani, and Aramayo, as well as executive producers McKay, Payne, and Weber. On October 14, The Official The Lord of the Rings: The Rings of Power Podcast was released on Amazon Music. Hosted by actress Felicia Day, the second episode is dedicated to "Adrift" and features Kavenagh, Payne, and McKay. On November 21, a bonus segment featuring behind-the-scenes footage from the episode was added to Prime Video's X-Ray feature as part of a series titled "The Making of The Rings of Power".
