= Design of The Lord of the Rings: The Rings of Power =

The Lord of the Rings: The Rings of Power is an American fantasy television series developed by J. D. Payne and Patrick McKay for the streaming service Amazon Prime Video. It is based on J. R. R. Tolkien's history of Middle-earth, primarily material from the appendices of the novel The Lord of the Rings (1954–55). It is produced by Amazon MGM Studios in association with New Line Cinema.

The series is set thousands of years before the novel and depicts the major events of Middle-earth's Second Age. The design team defined a design language for each of Middle-earth's cultures based on Tolkien's writings and other research, informing the approach for production design, costume design, prosthetics, weapons and props, and more. Ramsey Avery was the production designer for the first season, and was replaced by Kristian Milsted for subsequent seasons. Kate Hawley was the costume designer for the first season, followed by Luca Mosca for the second season.

== Background ==
Amazon acquired the global television rights for J. R. R. Tolkien's The Lord of the Rings (1954–55) in November 2017. The company's streaming service, Amazon Prime Video, gave a multi-season commitment to a series based on the novel and its appendices, to be produced by Amazon Studios in association with New Line Cinema and in consultation with the Tolkien Estate. J. D. Payne and Patrick McKay were set as showrunners of the series, titled The Lord of the Rings: The Rings of Power, which is set in the Second Age of Middle-earth, thousands of years before Tolkien's The Hobbit (1937) and The Lord of the Rings. While it is contractually not a continuation of Peter Jackson's The Lord of the Rings (2001–2003) and The Hobbit (2012–2014) film trilogies, the series is intended to be visually consistent with them, and the first season was produced in New Zealand like Jackson's films were. In August 2021, Amazon announced that it was moving production of future seasons to the United Kingdom, and other locations in Europe.

== Production ==
=== New Zealand ===
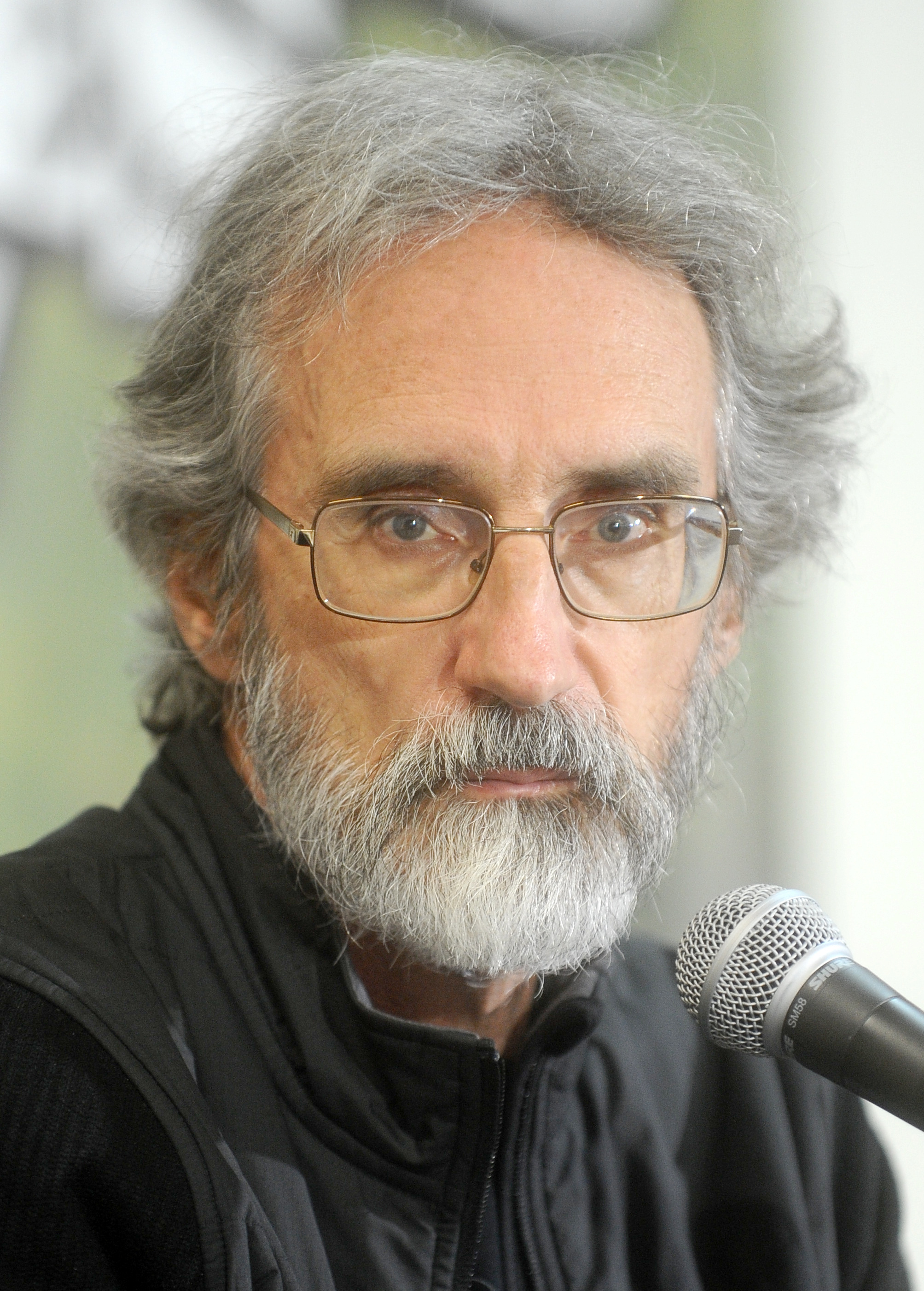
Illustrator John Howe was one of several creatives who returned from Peter Jackson's Middle-earth films to work on The Rings of Power. Although the series is not connected to the films, it is intended to be visually consistent with them.

Rick Heinrichs and Kate Hawley were respectively announced as production designer and costume designer in July 2019. Hawley returned from the films, along with illustrator/concept artist John Howe, and special effects company Wētā Workshop. Heinrichs was attached to the series before J. A. Bayona was hired to direct the first two episodes. Ramsey Avery was hired to replace Heinrichs as production designer around the end of August 2019, and said he was hired because most of what had been done initially "wasn't working", and the design team was struggling with the budget and schedule. He had to "start from scratch" and work quickly to be ready for filming in early 2020. Heinrichs is credited as production designer for the first two episodes alongside Avery. When he joined the series, the showrunners gave Avery five "guideposts" for what they wanted the design approach to be:

1. Middle-earth should feel like a real world that the characters live in, not a fantasy world
2. As many of the sets needed to be built for real as possible, using visual effects only when necessary
3. The audience should be able to easily identify the different cultures of Middle-earth
4. The design team had to work within the established budget and schedule
5. The series had to be true to Tolkien's writings

Avery studied the evolution of Middle-earth illustrations. The designers wanted Middle-earth to be recognizable for fans of the films, but they also had to reflect that the series is set thousands of years earlier and shows the "golden age" of many Middle-earth cultures. This contrasts with the Third Age's "period of decay". Hawley created mood boards that established a design language for each Middle-earth culture. The showrunners responded positively to these, and Avery was thankful that he could use them as the starting point for his own work. A "war room" was assembled where the design language for each culture was defined. Dialect coach Leith McPherson, returning from the Hobbit films, used different dialects for each culture, while supervising movement coach Lara Fischel-Chisholm developed different movement styles for the cultures based on their environments. Daniel Reeve, who was responsible for calligraphy and maps on the films, returned to do the same for the series and to invent new writing systems. Other key creatives included hair and makeup designer Jane O'Kane, prosthetics supervisor Jamie Wilson, prosthetics designer Jason Docherty, weapons master Joe Dunckley, prop master Matt Cornelius, and set decorator Megan Vertelle.

Bayona initially oversaw design work from his home in Barcelona from September to October 2019. Avery said "the Sun never set on the Rings of Power art department", which had 30 illustrators working across five continents and nine time zones for 18 months. They created around 38,000 pieces of concept art across different mediums, including at least one piece of concept art for every scene in Bayona's episodes, which Avery said was a "tremendous amount" to produce but created a basis for the whole series. Howe filled 40 sketchbooks with drawings for the first season. The production had use of seven stages and multiple backlot spaces in Auckland, at Auckland Film Studios, Kumeu Film Studios, and Kelly Park Film Studios; Kelly Park is a former equestrian center where they could dig into the dirt floor. Wētā Workshop created props, weapons, and prosthetics in Wellington, and shipped them to Auckland by truck. Due to the COVID-19 pandemic, the design team was unable to bring in extra help and resources from outside New Zealand once production on the first season was underway, changing some plans for later episodes. 87 sets, 2,000 costumes, and more than 1,000 weapons and 2,500 arrows were ultimately created.

=== United Kingdom ===
When production moved to the UK after the first season, several key creatives did not return including Avery and Hawley. Kristian Milsted and Luca Mosca took over as production designer and costume designer, respectively. Mosca had joined as an additional costume designer late in the first season. 70 shipping containers were used to move physical elements that were built for the first season from New Zealand to the UK. 120 physical sets were used for the second season, with two thirds of those being completely new builds. The other third of sets were re-used from the first season and were updated and expanded by the design team. Barrie and Sarah Gower's BGFX took over as the prosthetics house for the series. Other new creatives included hair and makeup designer Flora Moody, prop master John Hajdukiewicz, and set decorator Tina Jones. After joining the first season as a movement director, Tallulah Holly-Massey relocated to the UK to continue in that role on future seasons.

== Elves ==
Tolkien said the Elves were born under the stars "on shores of pearl" and first lived in nature, so stars, pearls, and other jewels became key symbols for them. Avery examined close-up photography of plants to include in Elvish architecture, and studied early Celtic art and La Tène culture for ways to make Elvish culture feel ancient. Vertical lines were used to show the Elves "reaching for the stars", including open towers. Light for Elvish locations was designed to be soft and ethereal. McPherson decided on Southern English accents for the Elves, Reeve used Tolkien's established scripts for Elvish writing, and Fischel-Chisholm directed the actors to move "serenely" and gracefully. Arondir actor Ismael Cruz Córdova differentiated his movements as a Wood Elf from the "aristocracy" of the High Elves by taking inspiration from capoeira and other martial arts. Prosthetics for the Elves' pointed ears were designed to match the lines of each actor's face. Each ear took several days to make and could only be used once.

Hawley differentiated costumes for Wood Elves, who she saw as reflecting grass, hills, and trees, from those for High Elves who reflect light, gold, and water. She chose fabrics that allowed for movement to show the gracefulness and lightness of the Elves. Arondir wears a wooden breastplate with a large face carved into it, inspired by an illustration of Elves by Alan Lee. The carved face is based on the Green Man architectural motif, but in the series it is meant to represent the face of an Ent, a tree-like being. The art of William Morris was another inspiration for Arondir's armor. The chainmail armor worn by Galadriel and her High Elf companions at the start of the series was inspired by depictions of Arthurian knights and a specific Pre-Raphaelite sculpture of a knight in armor. Some of the chainmail links were removed to make it appear more like lace. Because Tolkien described Elvish heroes in The Silmarillion as being "covered in the dust of diamonds" and reflecting surrounding snow and ice, Hawley added hundreds of rhinestones to the armor so it could reflect light.

The design team imagined that the near-immortal Elves would take long periods of time to create and refine their weapons. The Elvish weapons were also differentiated between High Elves, who are master metalworkers, and Wood Elves who are closer to nature. The metal used for the Elves' weapons was aged with acid to indicate that they allow corrosion to shape their blades. Bows were designed to look like an archer waited for the perfect branch to grow. Arondir's swords were designed to look like a tree grew around the blade and that branch was harvested without harming the tree, with the blade and wooden hilt refined together. Finrod's dagger, a key prop for the first season, was 3D printed using the superalloy Inconel. It has a stiletto blade design, representing a shaft of light, and the hilt is decorated with the Two Trees of Valinor. For Aeglos, the glaive wielded by High King Gil-galad, director Wayne Che Yip wanted it to have "the form of a wisp of smoke". A special machine was built to shape Aeglos from a single piece of aircraft-grade aluminum.

=== Lindon ===
Golden aspen trees (pictured) are featured in the series' depiction of the Elf-capital Lindon.

Avery differentiated the Elf-capital Lindon from the films' dark forest realm of Lothlórien by using golden birches and aspen trees. He was inspired by an image Hawley included in her mood board for the Elves which showed a pathway through a golden aspen forest. He felt this looked like both nature and architecture, and developed illustrations with artist Roberto Fernández Castro which guided the design of Lindon. Bayona wanted it to look like a forest in the shape of a cathedral, inspired by the works of architect Antoni Gaudí such as the church Sagrada Família in Barcelona. The production did not have access to any natural forests that could portray Lindon, so sets were built on a stage with 125 artificial aspen trees. These were built on platforms that could be rearranged to portray different areas of Lindon. The Great Tree of Lindon was a large sculpture dressed with 14,700 handmade leaves.

To show that the Elves are not just "lounging about", some are seen weaving a tapestry about Valinor in the background. The real 24-square-foot (2.2 m^{2}) tapestry was created by a weaver in France. The set for the Hall of Memorial Trees was created separately from the main Lindon stage and features twelve sculptures that Howe designed to represent Elves from Tolkien's history, including Finrod, and Lúthien. One of the carvings is based on Payne's likeness. Elvish swan-ships from Tolkien's writings are seen in the series. Avery said initial attempts at designing a swan-shaped boat looked more suited for "an afternoon-in-the-park", and they avoided this by forming the swan shape from vines.

=== Eregion ===
For Eregion, the realm of the great Elven-smith Celebrimbor, Avery used more statement architecture compared to his designs for Lindon. He attributed this to Celebrimbor's arrogance, differentiating Eregion from the Lindon style of blending architecture with nature. Architect Louis Sullivan was an inspiration for the Eregion designs. Based on early drafts of the scripts, which featured more interactions between the Elves of Eregion and the Dwarves of Khazad-dûm than is seen in the completed first season, Avery included Dwarvish influences in Eregion. In Tolkien's writings, Elrond founds the settlement of Rivendell after spending time in Eregion; Avery wanted to indicate that Eregion has an influence on Rivendell's design by including elements from the films' depiction of Rivendell in his designs for Eregion, such as similar rooftops. Reeve used Tolkien's Elvish scripts for Celebrimbor's laboratory notes, which include lists of elements, descriptions of alchemical experiments, and Elvish mathematics. He used watercolor paintings to depict architectural drawings.

During the first season, Celebrimbor builds a forge where most of the Rings of Power are eventually created. Avery originally planned to build a full new set for the forge, but was unable to due to the COVID-19 pandemic. Instead, a Númenórean dungeon set from earlier episodes was repurposed for the forge. The set and its props were inspired by research with real ring makers in Auckland.

== Dwarves ==
In Tolkien's history of Middle-earth, the Dwarves were created by Aulë—the smith of the god-like Valar—from fire and stone. This inspired a fire-based color palette and use of open flames for light. Avery researched ancient mines and stone carvings, while Bayona took inspiration from the films of Russian directors Sergei Eisenstein and Andrei Tarkovsky. Because Aulë is married to Yavanna, the Vala of nature, the design team felt the Dwarves would avoid cutting down trees where possible and chose to avoid using wood in Dwarvish furniture, often using metal instead. Vertelle suggested they use petrified wood in some instances. Words from "The Song of Durin", which the Dwarf Gimli sings in The Lord of the Rings, were carved into walls using Tolkien's Cirth runes. The angular runes also inspired the use of triangles and diamonds in Dwarvish designs. Other recurring motifs include rams, ravens, and three mountain peaks which represents the Misty Mountains above the Dwarven realm of Khazad-dûm.

McPherson gave the Dwarves a Scottish dialect, and the look of Durin IV was inspired by Scottish knights and kings. Hawley designed the costumes to hide the actors true body shapes, to imply that the Dwarves have a differen physiology; chainmail armor was made oversized to hide where the actors' waists are, and their boots look like they are hiding large, "gnarly" feet. The boots have a five-toe design based on classical Germanic statues. Some Dwarves wear helmets with built-in shields for their beards, inspired by Greek armor and concept art by Howe. Different costume designs were used to expand Dwarvish culture, with Hawley's team developing styles for actors who portray guards, farmers, priests, and more. The costumes include precious stones and gold dust from Dwarvish mines. Beard, hair, and facial prosthetics were applied to the Dwarvish actors. It took two-and-a-half hours to apply these to Durin IV actor Owain Arthur each day, including nose and ear prosthetics, a wig, and a 16-piece beard made from human, angora goat, horse, and yak hair as well as copper threads. The beard was supported by a hook built into his costume. Dwarvish movements were meant to look like they are carrying more weight, which was aided by the heavy costumes and prosthetics.

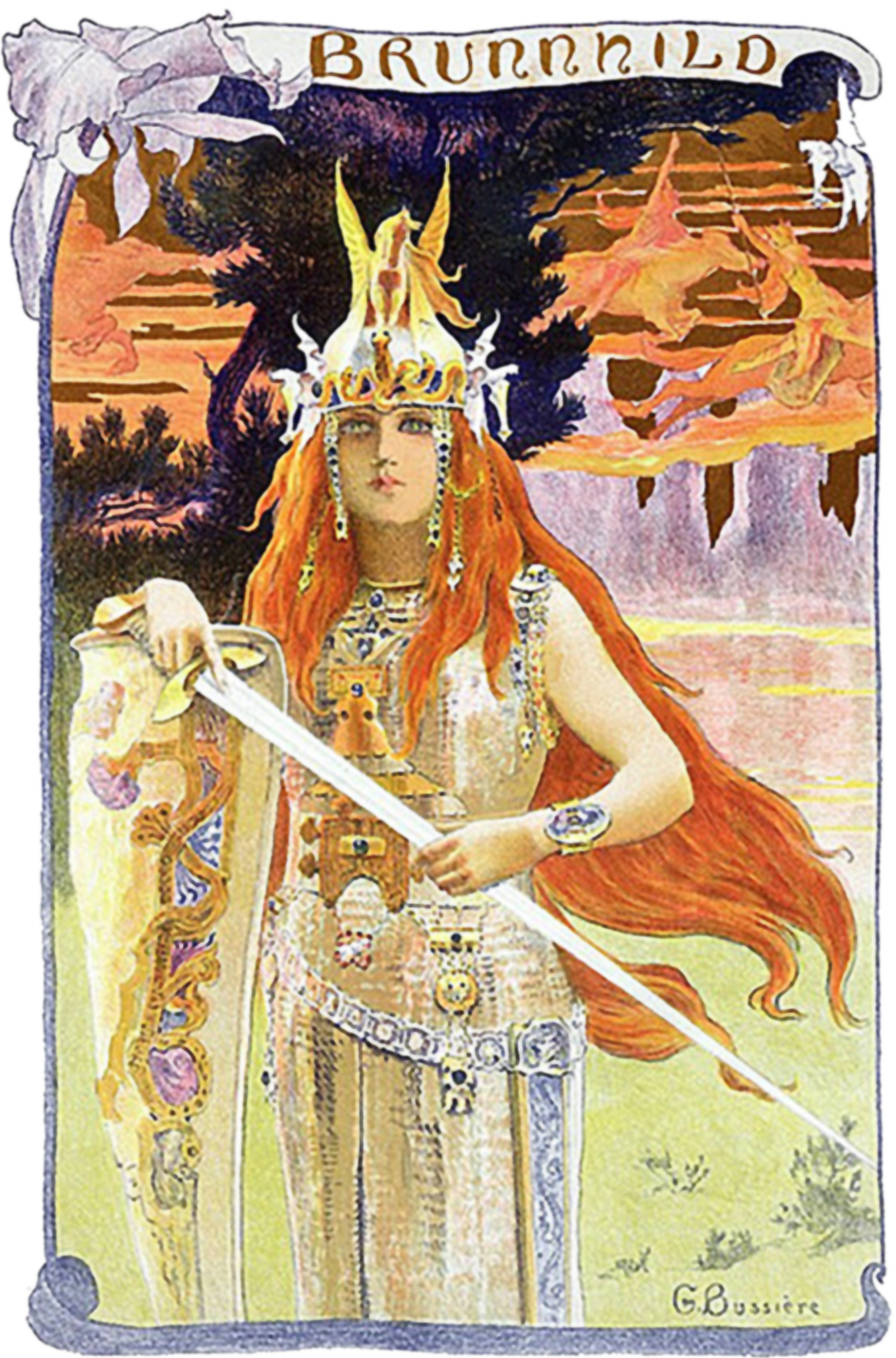
The costumes for the Dwarf princess Disa took some inspiration from depictions of Brunhild from Germanic heroic legend. Pictured is Brunnhild by Gaston Bussière.

Tolkien stated that female Dwarves were "in voice and appearance... so like to the Dwarf-men that the eyes and ears of other peoples cannot tell them apart", which was referenced in Jackson's films with a joke about female Dwarves having large beards like male Dwarves. For Durin's wife Disa, who is the first female Dwarf to have a prominent role in a Tolkien adaptation, the producers wanted to give her a beard but also did not want to lose her femininity. After trying beards of various lengths, they opted for more subtle facial hair with "sideburns and a sprinkling of face fluff". Hawley's initial concepts for Disa featured bulky costumes in an attempt to match the traditional physicality of Dwarves. The producers felt this hid actress Sophia Nomvete's body too much and did not match Disa's personality. Hawley moved towards a more flowy design inspired by water running over rocks. Taking inspiration from depictions of Brunhild and the Nibelung from Germanic heroic legends, she was inspired to add splits in Disa's dress to show her bare legs. To ensure she still looked Dwarvish, the character wears large boots like the other Dwarves and has elements of stone and gold throughout her dress. Her hair style was inspired by ram horns, and Nomvete wore contact lenses to give Disa golden eyes.

The showrunners said the series was an opportunity to show Khazad-dûm in its full glory, in contrast with the desolate ruin that it is in The Lord of the Rings. They initially intended to film some Khazad-dûm scenes in the Waitomo Caves, but this proved to be impractical. Because Gimli says in The Lord of the Rings that his people respect stone in a similar way to how others respect trees, Avery decided that the high ceilings and geometric carvings used for Dwarves in the films could have been caused by greed and corruption in the Third Age. The series is set before the Dwarves are overcome with greed, so he wanted the designs for Khazad-dûm in the Second Age to respect the natural shapes and formations within the mountain. He also added reflected light, rivers, and vegetation, and put a focus on the Dwarves' engineering skills. Khazad-dûm was designed with the Unreal Engine, SketchUp, and Rhino software, and was primarily created by visual effects company Wētā FX. Exterior shots were filmed on location, and on a set that was built on the backlot at Kumeu Film Studios. A lot of the Dwarvish sets were built twice at different scales to be able to depict the Dwarf and Elf characters at the correct heights. Dwarvish weapons feature non-symmetrical geometry to reflect natural rock formations, such as Durin's dagger which has an unshaped gold nugget and vein of gold in its hilt. The octagonal handles of the Dwarves' pickaxes were inspired by basalt columns.

== Low Men ==
Avery said the Low Men of the Southlands were downtrodden and the lowest of the human castes. McPherson assigned them a Northern English accent. Their light primarily comes from primitive torches and lanterns covered with layers of antler horn. The make-up team created the appearance of skin disorders, scabs, and psoriasis on the actors to show their lack of vitamins. The Southlanders use runes for writing, like the Dwarves, but Reeve evolved this so it could be written cursively in Bronwyn's apothecary notes.

The Tirharad village set was built on a farm near Auckland, while Bronwyn's house was built on a hill overlooking the village. Avery described the architecture as "melting into the landscapes", with thatched roofs that are made from surrounding grasses and further embed the buildings in the landscape. The bright green countryside was digitally altered to appear more grey and brown, to reflect the difficult living conditions of the Southlanders. The Ostirith tower set was built on a backlot at Kelly Park, up to 40 feet (12 m). The rest of the tower was created with visual effects, and digitally placed beside Lake Quill in Fiordland National Park. After the Southlands are destroyed in the eruption of Mount Doom at the end of the episode "Udûn", a new set was built for the ruins of Tirharad inside Kelly Park. A new location introduced in the second season is the Númenórean colony of Pelargir, where refugees from the Southlands are now living. It was designed to look like a Númenórean settlement that has been adapted to the style of the Southland buildings.

== High Men ==
The showrunners said visiting the island kingdom of Númenor was one of the key reasons for making a series set in the Second Age, calling it a major Tolkien location with important lore, characters, and ideas, that had not been seen in previous adaptations. Payne, McKay, and Avery put a lot of focus on the designs for Númenor, and the showrunners said they were obsessed with getting it right and depicting Númenor as the "greatest kingdom of Men that ever existed". Avery worked closely with Yip on the designs before confirming them with the showrunners. They planned the entire city of Armenelos, with three layers of architecture based on Tolkien's history of Númenor: the original Elvish layer, which is vertical and ethereal; a more "Mannish" layer as the Númenóreans developed their own culture; and an anti-Elvish layer as they cut ties with the Elves. Because the realm of Gondor in the films is founded by Númenóreans, Avery wanted Númenor to look like the inspiration for the Gondor city Minas Tirith but with more "grandeur, beauty, and richness".

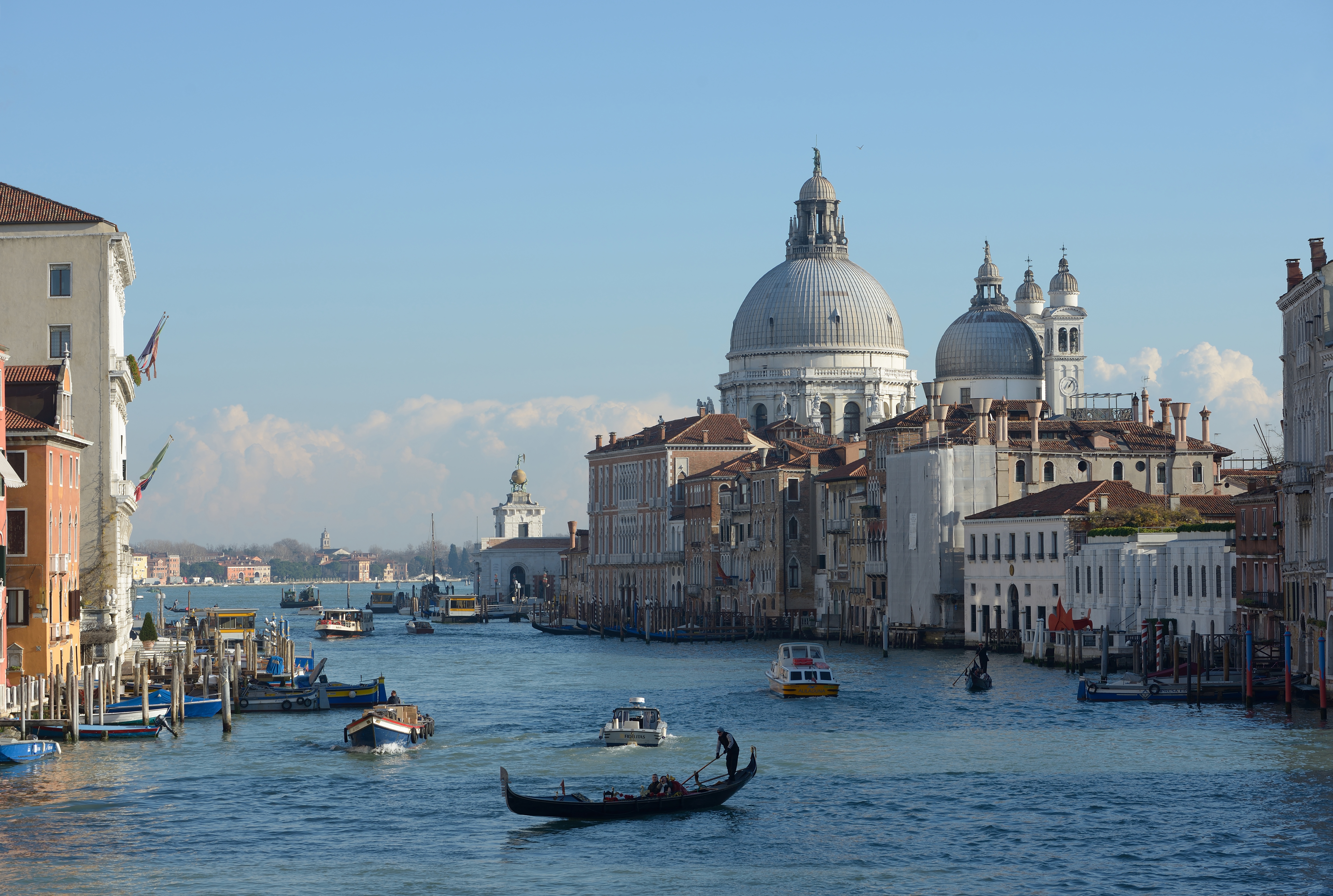
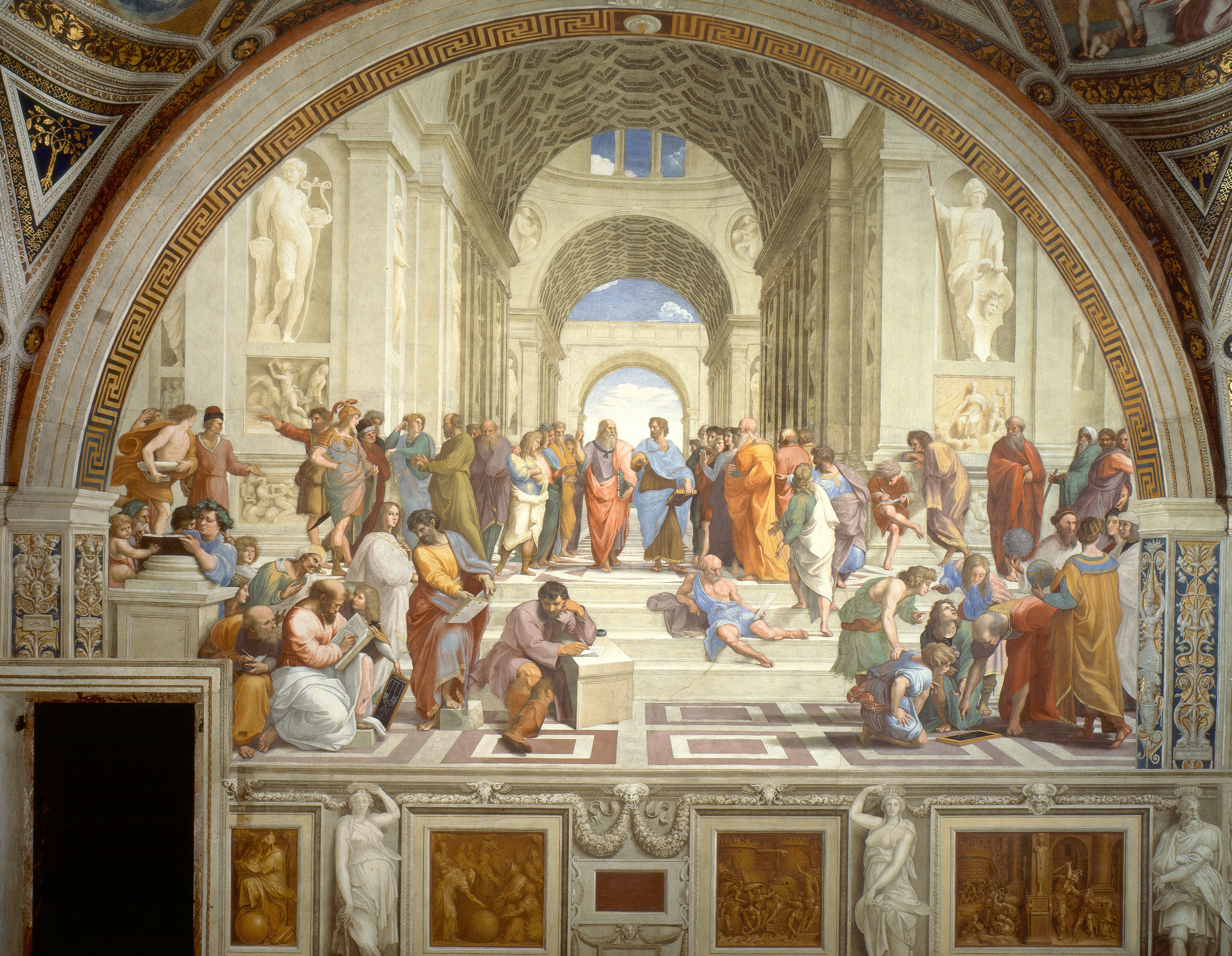
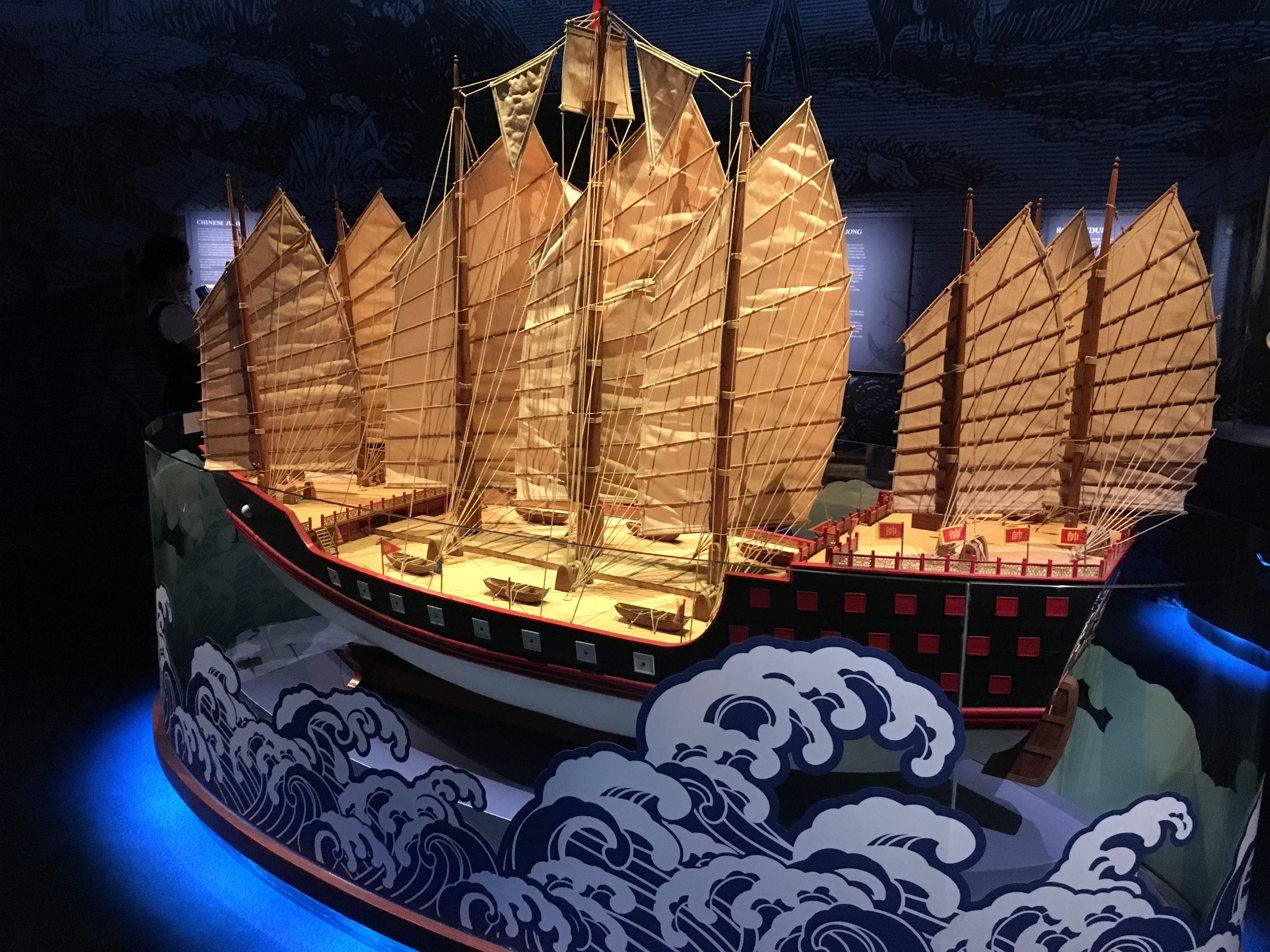
Some of the inspirations for Númenórean designs: Tolkien compared Númenor to Venice (top), so production designer Ramsey Avery studied that city; the showrunners were inspired by the painting The School of Athens by Raphael (middle) for Númenor's court room; and the sails of a Chinese junk ship (bottom) inspired the design for Númenórean ships after Avery saw a similarity between them and the crown of Gondor from the Lord of the Rings films.

Tolkien compared Númenor to Venice, so Avery studied that city and mirrored its connection to water. He used the color blue in a lot of the city's locations to emphasize the culture's relationship with water and sailing. He also used Venetian glass for many of its light sources. Tolkien said Men were the most creative race due to their short lifespans, which is shown in Númenórean designs with bold shapes and ornamentation. The city's "looming marble structures" and "bold shapes, rich colors, and geometrical ornament[s]" were inspired by Ancient Greece, Ancient Egypt, and the rest of North Africa and the Middle East. Designs from Ancient Rome, Babylon, and the Minoan civilization were also referenced to make Númenor feel ancient. A digital model of the city was created in Unreal Engine which the practical sets and final visual effects were both based on. Avery worked with Julien Gauthier at visual effects company Industrial Light & Magic (ILM) to work out the topography of Númenor, combining footage of the Aldermen Islands, Mokohinau Islands, cliffs near Kahurangi National Park, and the gorges of the Rangitīkei River. Númenor's harbor includes a giant statue of Eärendil that welcomes ships to the city. The statue includes a carving of a Silmaril on its brow and a bird on one shoulder that represents Eärendil's wife Elwing. Eärendil is the father of Elrond and Elros, the latter being the first king of Númenor.

The main set for Armenelos was almost 300,000 square feet (28,000 m^{2}) and was described as "an entire seaside city" with buildings, a market, a smithy, alleyways, shrines, graffiti, and a ship docked at the harbor inside a large water tank. The set took four or five months to build on the backlot at Kumeu Film Studios, using a form of Roman concrete that was created with seashells. The design team included real plants, fruits, and incense on set so it smelled like a real city to the actors. There are visible graves around the city because Avery wanted there to always be a sense of death hanging over the Númenóreans, due to a fear of death and a resentment of the immortal Elves being key drivers for the Númenórean story. Another recurring motif is the Sun, because Men appear in Tolkien's history when the Sun first rises, and as a reference to Icarus flying too close to the Sun in Greek mythology which was considered to be an apt metaphor for the Númenóreans. Reeve developed a history for Númenórean language and writing, tracking how they went from writing in the Elvish tengwar script to using a new script for their own language, Tolkien's constructed language Adûnaic. This was used for lore-relevant notes on message boards throughout the city.

Additional sets were made for specific locations within the city. The showrunners were inspired by the painting The School of Athens (1509–1511) by Raphael for their depiction of Númenor's court room, which is circular and does not have the throne elevated. Avery said this showed that the Númenóreans live with a sense of control and have no fear of dictators or enemies. The layers of Númenórean history were also reflected in these additional sets. For example, the Númenórean dungeon was designed to be a centuries-old Elvish-style shrine to Uinen, a Maia related to the sea, that had been converted into a holding cell by the anti-Elf Númenóreans in recent decades. It includes a 25-foot (7.6 m) tall sculpture of Uinen. Avery gave this as an example of the level of detail in the designs that were inspired by Tolkien's writings rather than the series' scripts. The Númenórean Hall of Lore used the same set as the dungeon, due to budget and space constraints. The details of the dungeon walls were hidden by cabinets full of scrolls. A decision that Avery made early in the design process was that the Númenóreans invented bookbinding while the Elves used scrolls, so filling the Hall of Lore with scrolls indicates that it is full of older knowledge related to Númenor's Elvish history. Avery studied how scrolls are stored in Tibet when approaching the storage cabinets for the set. A tapestry in the Hall of Lore shows Elrond and Elros together.

For Elendil's ship, Avery studied Greek triremes, Venetian barges, and a Māori waka model at the Auckland Maritime Museum. He had an epiphany when he saw a similarity between the sails of a double-masted Chinese junk ship and the crown of Gondor from the Lord of the Rings films. He felt a design like that for a Númenórean ship could indicate that the crown is based on the ships that the ancestors of Gondor take to Middle-earth. The body of the ship was inspired by scorpion-tailed Venetian boats, while Viking ships also influenced the design. Avery worked with experts to ensure the ship was functional with its unique sails, and real sailors were hired as extras to work on the ship during filming. The ship was 46 tons (41,730 kg), 105 feet (32 m) long, and was built on a six-axis gimble. It took 10 months to build and Avery credited its quality to the skill of local New Zealand boat builders.

Different guilds were created to help define Númenórean society, including the builders, merchants, horsemasters, and the sea guard. A crest was designed for each guild. The Númenórean scale armor was inspired by seahorses and replicated in the barding for their horses. Elendil's breastplate and bracers was inspired by whale bone carvings and include the Sun motif. Elements of coral and shell were also included in the armor for decoration. Númenórean weapons went through the most concept art of any culture due to the lack of precedent in previous adaptations. Elendil's sword features the Sun motif, while an infinity symbol was repeated throughout Númenórean weaponry, including on their scabbards, to reflect their struggle with mortality.

== Easterlings ==
The second season introduced the eastern land of Rhûn, which had not been seen in previous Tolkien adaptations. Rhûn was imagined for the series as once being a Garden of Eden-style paradise that has become a "dead wasteland" by the events of the second season. The showrunners were excited to depict the first on-screen Middle-earth desert. Location filming for Rhûn took place in Tenerife, Canary Islands.

== Halflings ==
=== Harfoots ===
Bayona took inspiration from traveler communities for the Harfoots, who are precursors to the diminutive Hobbits from The Lord of the Rings. Hobbits are known to be good at blending in with nature, which inspired the idea that their ancestors' clothing and wagons could camouflage with their surroundings as they migrate. The Harfoots use Irish accents. Fischel-Chisholm used the movements of young children and meerkats as references for how the Harfoots should move. The prosthetics for the Harfoots' large, hairy feet have the same design as those used for Hobbits in the films, but modern technology allowed the new versions to be sturdier and have moveable toes. The feet each took three weeks to create and could be used several times. The hair and make-up team referenced animals for the Harfoots and created their wigs from mohair.

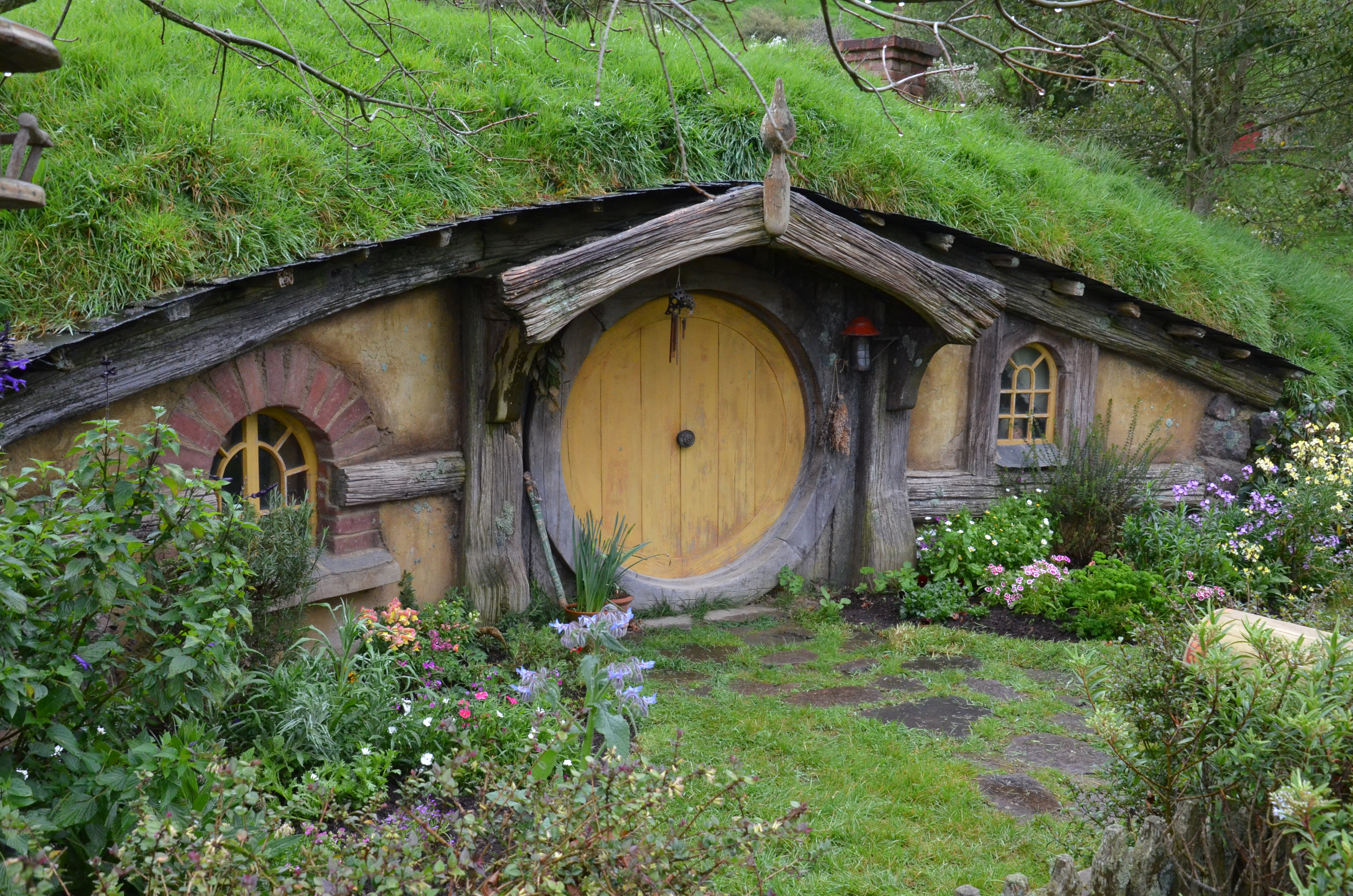
The large wheels of the Harfoot wagons were intended to evoke the round doors of Hobbit holes (pictured) seen in the Lord of the Rings films.

The Harfoot costumes include accessories as camouflage, including berries, acorns, leaves, and other natural elements. These were made bigger than normal so they would appear to be the correct size on the Harfoots, who are meant to be much smaller than humans. Elements were hand-made with techniques that the Harfoots would use themselves, such as coloring fabric with vegetable dyes, berry stains, and soot, or weaving the canopies of their wagons from branches. New Zealand willow weaver Mike Lilian was hired to work on the latter. Each wagon was designed to be unique to its Harfoot family and was engineered so they could actually be moved by the actors. Avery wanted the large wheels of the wagons to remind viewers of the round Hobbit doors seen in the films. The Harfoot furniture was designed to be collapsible so it could fit inside their wagons.

For the Harfoots' books, which record star maps and their collected knowledge, Reeve initially wrote in English with a "Harfoot-looking" script. Avery decided this was inappropriate for the Second Age and the text needed to be more primitive. He gave Reeve examples of early pictographs as inspiration, and Reeve developed a new script using simple pictures which the Harfoots could use to represent the natural world and phonetic sounds. These pictures were also carved into the Harfoots' wagons and furniture.

=== Stoors ===
The second season introduced a tribe of Harfoot-like Stoors who live in Rhûn. The arid canyon that the Stoors live in was designed to be very different from the Shire where the descendants of Harfoots and Stoors live in The Lord of the Rings. It features abodes dug into the rock, including a library.

== Orcs ==
It was important to the showrunners that practical effects and prosthetics be used to create the Orcs where possible, though these were augmented by the visual effects team in some instances. They also wanted to expand on Orc culture, creating rules for their society and introducing female and child Orcs. The design team defined five different types of Orcs, including leaders and "Reavers". Wilson described the latter as "crazy serial killer orcs". He explained that the Orcs in the series are intended to be "younger"-looking than those in the films, since these groups are just emerging from hiding after being scattered and nearly wiped out at the end of the First Age. Because of this, they feature less battle-scars than those in the films and are also lighter-skinned with some skin conditions caused by new exposure to the Sun. Lighter skin colors were achieved using translucent silicone as a base, which would not have been possible when the films were made and latex was the primary material used. The Orc prosthetics took between two and seven hours to apply each day. This included multiple interlocking prosthetic pieces as well as wigs, dentures, and contact lenses. Because of interference from the prosthetics in the actors' mouths, all of the Orc dialogue had to be re-recorded after filming. Orc weapons were designed to look like axes, scythes, and other scavenged items that have been deformed into "hooked" shapes with split edges and rust. They are decorated with items such as rotten bird skulls and severed ears. The tunnels that are dug by the Orcs through the beautiful landscape of the Southlands during the first season were inspired by the trenches of World War I.

Wilson said his biggest design challenge for the first season was Adar, the "father" of the Orcs, who is a corrupted Elf. The design went through many iterations to determine where he should fall between an Elf and an Orc. The final design is closer to an Elf, with Elvish pointed ears and a "noble" face but "one degree" of darkness added. The prosthetics include fake ears and cheekbones, along with scars and a "septic, slightly eerie" skin tone created with makeup. Actor Joseph Mawle had strong opinions on how Adar should look, focusing on the character's long life and many experiences of pain and sorrow. The character's sword began with a similar silhouette to Elvish swords, but was distorted to be "off kilter" and asymmetrical. Black gems were added which Dunckley compared to "many eyes peering from the twisted" hilt.

Around 1,500 sets of Orc prosthetics were created for the second season. The Orcs' armor was designed to look like it was pieced together with items stolen from other cultures.

== Other ==
The design team wanted magic and creatures to be rooted in nature. The powerful metal Mithril was made from a translucent material with a shape that mixed organic and faceted surfaces. This was gilded with gun bluing and augmented by the visual effects team. Taking inspiration from Sauron's whispers in the films, which can be heard in scenes related to the One Ring and the unseen world, sound designer Damian Del Borrello created a similar sound for magic by recording himself whispering Elvish incantations. These represent the whispers of Eru Ilúvatar, the creator of Middle-earth, since the One Ring does not yet exist at the start of the series.

=== Sauron ===
The broken hilt of a black sword, given by Sauron to the Low Men of the Southlands, is seen throughout the first season and revealed to be a key that helps trigger the eruption of Mount Doom. It was originally designed more like a traditional sword, but Avery wanted it to have a unique design. The final look was described as "dark [and] twisted", covered in barbs and spikes that draw the blood of the person holding it, which gives the hilt power. The spiked pommel reflects the design of Sauron's helmet, while the broken blade is meant to look like onyx and features an early version of the "Eye of Sauron" mark from The Lord of the Rings.

=== Tom Bombadil ===
The mysterious character Tom Bombadil from The Lord of the Rings is included in the second season's Rhûn storyline. The showrunners described his home in the season as a "summer cottage", since his actual home is not in Rhûn. Milsted wanted it to be in an oasis within the Rhûn desert, surrounded by trees, animals, and bees. He incorporated a star map into the house's ceiling to show the character's connection to the wider universe. Mosca's costume for Tom was based on Tolkien's description of the character: a blue jacket, yellow boots, and a feather in his distinctive hat.

== See also ==
- Production design of The Lord of the Rings film series
