= J. A. Bayona =

Spanish film director

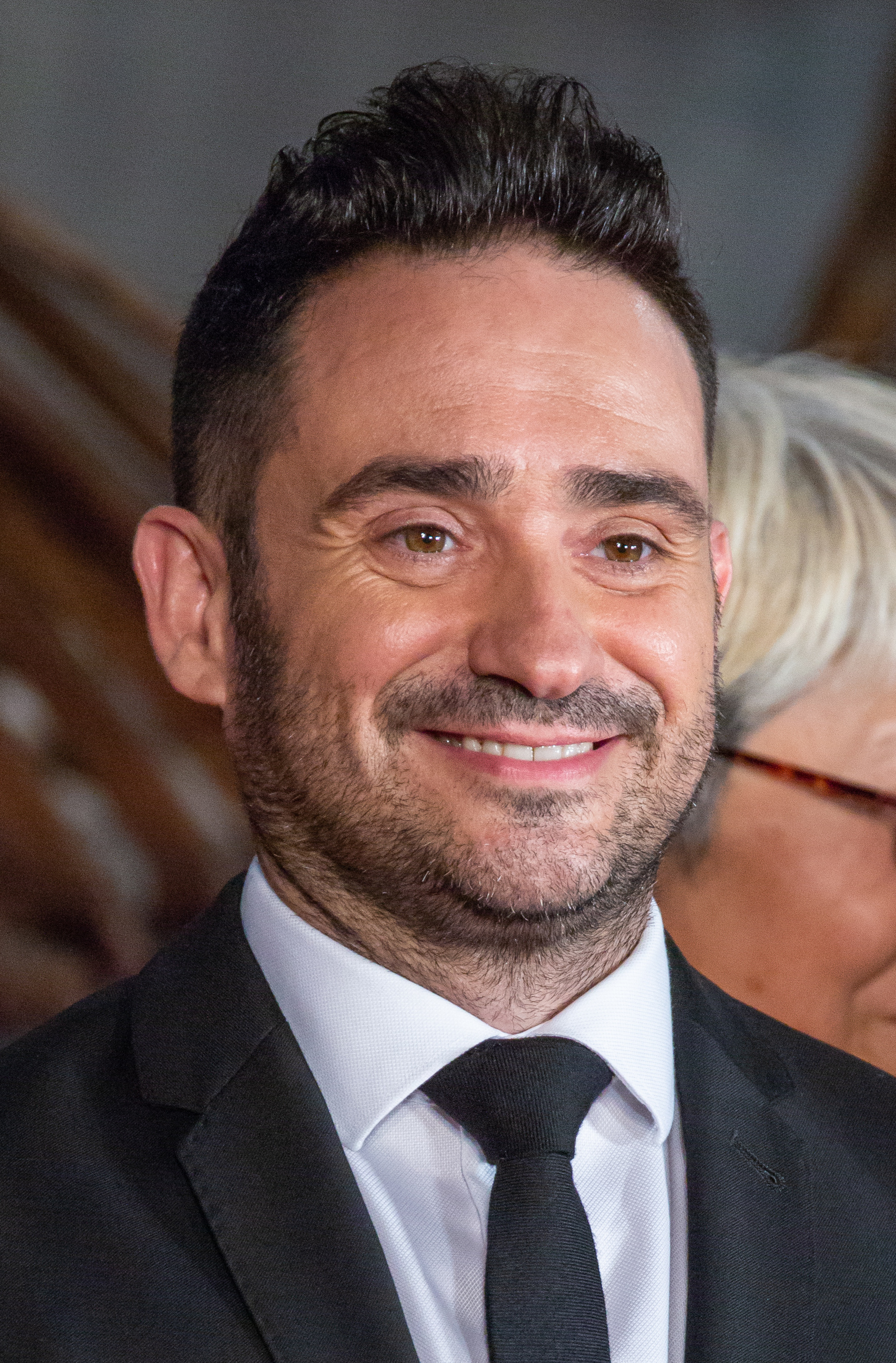
- Bayona at the 2018 Tokyo premiere of Jurassic World: Fallen Kingdom
- Born: Juan Antonio García Bayona; 9 May 1975 (age 51); Barcelona, Spain
- Occupation: Film director
- Years active: 1999–present

Juan Antonio García Bayona (born 9 May 1975) is a Spanish filmmaker.

Bayona directed the 2007 horror film The Orphanage, the 2012 drama film The Impossible, the 2016 fantasy drama film A Monster Calls, and the 2018 film Jurassic World: Fallen Kingdom. He also directed the first two episodes of The Lord of the Rings: The Rings of Power.

His 2023 film Society of the Snow received 12 awards including Best Picture and Best Director at the 38th Goya Awards, 6 awards at the 11th Platino Awards, and was nominated for 2 Academy Awards.

== Early life ==
Bayona was born in Barcelona, Spain. The first movie he ever saw was Richard Donner's Superman (1978) which inspired him to be a director. He studied at the Escola Superior de Cinema i Audiovisuals de Catalunya (ESCAC). At age 19 he met Guillermo del Toro at the Sitges Film Festival presenting Cronos (1993) and Bayona recognized him as a mentor there. After their initial conversations, del Toro promised to aid Bayona in the future if he were ever in the position to do so.

== Career ==
=== 1990s ===
After graduating from ESCAC he began his career directing commercials and music videos. At the age of 20, he signed his first contract as audiovisual producer for the Spanish band OBK. After three years working with them, he was awarded the Premios Ondas for the music video "Tú sigue así". Since then, he has become the principal director of the group Camela and was commissioned to illustrate the piece "Cómo repartimos los amigos", in which the duo Ella Baila Sola bid farewell to their audience.

He has also directed music videos for Pastora Soler ("En mi soledad"), Fangoria, Nena Daconte ("El Aleph"), Enrique Bunbury and Miren Iza ("Frente a frente"), in which the original singer Jeanette appears at the end of the video. In 2012 he created the music video for "Disconnected" by the British band Keane.

In 1999 he directed the short film My Holidays and in 2002 The Spongeman.

=== 2000s ===
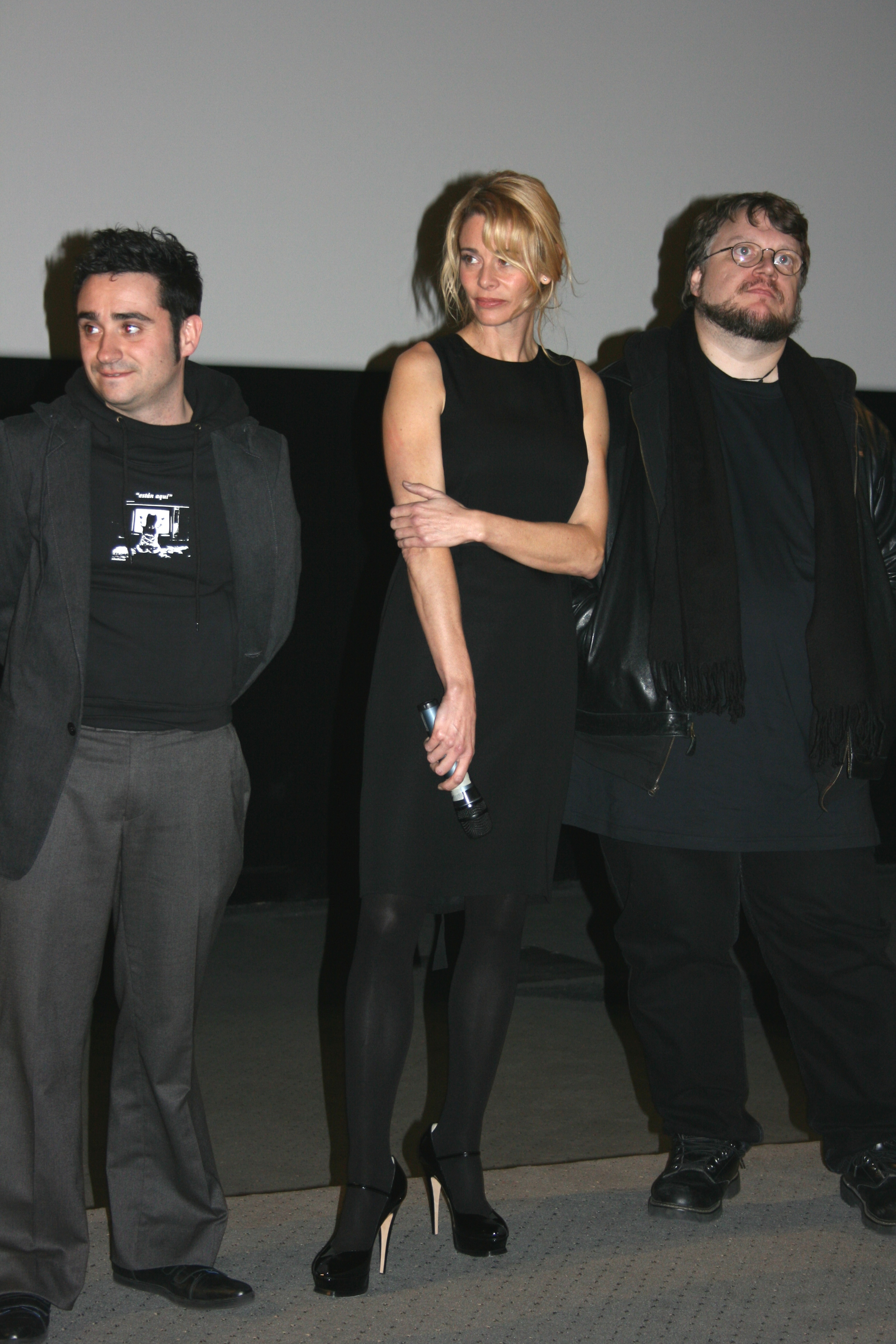
Bayona next to Belén Rueda and Guillermo del Toro presenting The Orphanage in Paris in 2008

In 2004 Bayona met writer Sergio G. Sánchez, who was working on the short 7337. Sánchez offered Bayona the script for The Orphanage. In order to create the film he wanted, Bayona had to double both the film's budget and its runtime so he reached out to his friend and mentor Guillermo del Toro, who offered to co-produce it. The Orphanage premiered on 20 May 2007, at the Cannes International Film Festival, where it received a standing ovation lasting more than ten minutes. Months later, on 11 October 2007, it was released in Spanish cinemas and grossed $8.3 million. Bayona was awarded the Goya Award for Best New Director in 2008. The film was nominated for 14 categories of Goyas, and won seven. In October of that same year, Variety announced that Universal Studios had signed a contract with Bayona to adapt the film Hater by David Moody, written by Glen Mazzara and produced by del Toro.

Bayona was one of the many candidates considered to direct The Twilight Saga: Eclipse but was not interested in making the film.

=== 2010s ===
In August 2010 he began filming The Impossible, based on the experiences of a Spanish family that lived through the 2004 Indian Ocean earthquake. Filmed in English and starring Ewan McGregor, Naomi Watts and Tom Holland, the film was released on 11 October 2012, to positive critical response. In its first weekend it grossed $8.6 million, breaking the record for the best opening in the history of the Spanish box office. The Impossible was nominated for the Oscar and Golden Globe Awards in the category of Best Actress for the interpretation of Naomi Watts. The film was also nominated in 14 categories at the Goya Awards, including Best Film, Best Director, Best Actress, Best Supporting Actor and Best Actor (Tom Holland), of which it won five awards. In 2013 The Impossible received a National Film Award in the framework of the 61st International Festival of San Sebastián.

In March 2012 Bayona directed the music video "Disconnected", the second single from the album Strangeland by the British band Keane. The band has stated that it admires Bayona's film work, and Bayona has said he follows the music of Keane. On 11 September 2016, Keane released a music video for an exclusive new song, "Tear Up This Town", written and recorded for the fantasy drama film A Monster Calls, directed by Bayona. The single was made available for digital download on 23 September 2016.

Bayona was responsible for directing the first two episodes of the Penny Dreadful series, created by John Logan and originally released on Showtime. Filmed in Dublin, the series tells the story of a group consisting of a rich man, a medium, a gunman and a young doctor, all looking for the rich man's missing daughter. To do this, they must cope with strange beings and Victorian era literary characters like Frankenstein, Dracula and Dorian Gray. The series has a lot of its creator, according to Bayona.

In 2014, Bayona began shooting the film A Monster Calls, an adaptation of the novel by Patrick Ness, starring Lewis MacDougall, Felicity Jones, and Liam Neeson. The film, which was released in 2016, tells the story of a young boy (MacDougall) who cares for his mother (Jones), ill with cancer, while befriending a monster (Neeson). With this film, Bayona closed his personal trilogy about mother-child relationships.

In 2018, Bayona next directed the science fiction sequel Jurassic World: Fallen Kingdom, starring Chris Pratt, Bryce Dallas Howard, Justice Smith, Rafe Spall, Toby Jones and James Cromwell. The film received mixed reviews from critics but Bayona's direction received praise. It was also a major commercial success, becoming the third-highest-grossing film of 2018 and the 12th-highest-grossing film of all time.

=== 2020s ===
Bayona directed the first two episodes of the Amazon Prime Video series The Lord of the Rings: The Rings of Power, filmed in New Zealand from 3 February 2020 and premiered on 2 September 2022.

In November 2021, it was announced Bayona would direct the disaster drama Society of the Snow for Netflix, based on the true story of Uruguayan Air Force Flight 571, which crashed into the Andes in October 1972. The film was released theatrically to Spanish-speaking audiences in December 2023 before its arrival to Netflix on 4 January 2024. It received positive reviews and many honors.

Beyond Society (Más allá de la sociedad) is an upcoming 2026 documentary series that Bayona created with Carlos Torres.

== Filmography ==
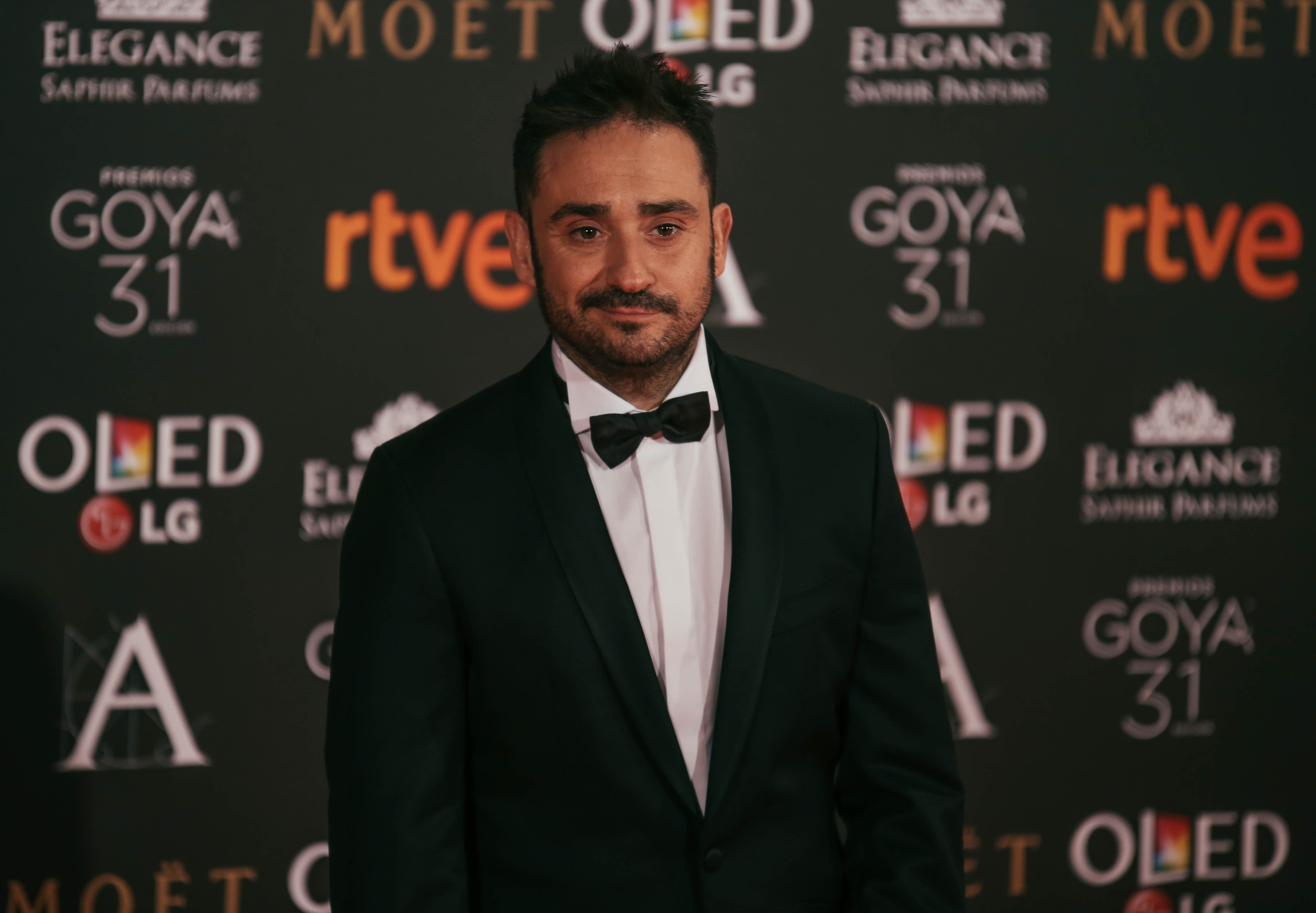
Bayona attending the 31st Goya Awards in 2017

=== Short films ===
Year	Title	Director	Writer	Executive Producer	Notes
1999	Mis vacaciones	Yes	Yes	No	
2003	El hombre Esponja	Yes	Yes	Yes	
2008	La Desgracia en 3D	Yes	Yes	No	
2015	9 días en Haití	Yes	Yes	No	Documentary short
2015	No me quites	No	No	Yes	

=== Feature films and documentaries ===
Year	Title	Director	Writer	Producer
2007	The Orphanage	Yes	No	No
2012	The Impossible	Yes	No	No
2016	A Monster Calls	Yes	No	No
2018	Jurassic World: Fallen Kingdom	Yes	No	No
2023	Society of the Snow	Yes	Yes	Yes
2024	Free Falling	No	No	Yes
2025	Crazy Old Lady	No	No	Yes
2025	She Walks in Darkness	No	No	Yes
2026	Beyond Society (documentary)	No	Yes (Created by)	Yes
2028	Untitled fifth Jurassic World film	Yes	No	No

Executive producer

- Marrowbone (2017)
- I Hate New York (2018) (Documentary)

=== Television ===
Year	Title	Director	Executive Producer	Notes
2014	Penny Dreadful	Yes	No	Episodes "Night Work" and "Séance"
2022–present	The Lord of the Rings: The Rings of Power	Yes	Yes	Episodes "A Shadow of the Past" and "Adrift"

== Awards and nominations ==
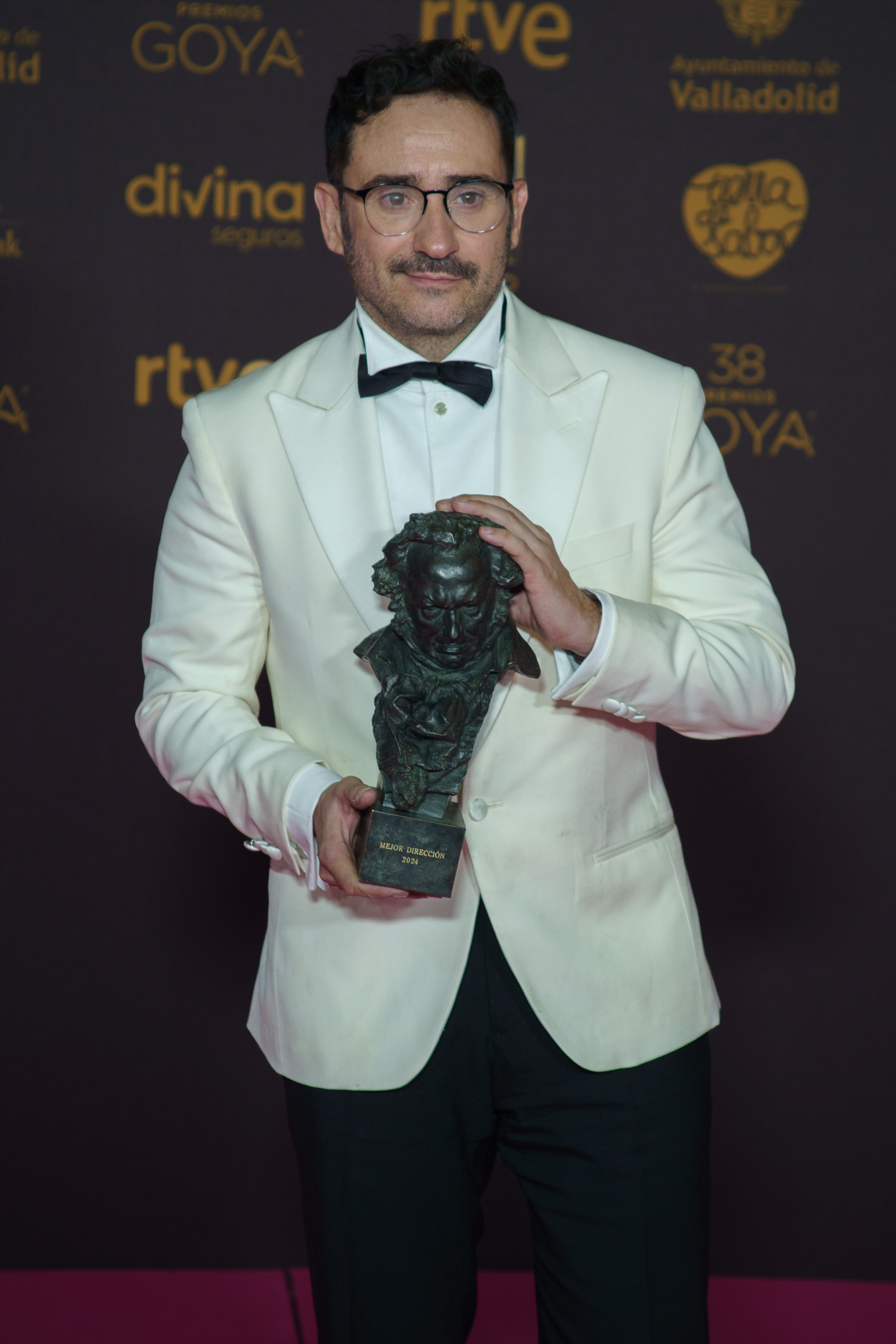
Bayona holding his Goya Award for Best Director for Society of the Snow

Academy Awards

Year	Title	Category	Result	Ref.
2024	Society of the Snow	Best International Feature Film	Nominated	

BAFTA Awards

Year	Title	Category	Result	Ref.
2024	Society of the Snow	Best Film Not in the English Language	Nominated	

Golden Globe Awards

Year	Title	Category	Result	Ref.
2024	Society of the Snow	Best Non-English Language Film	Nominated	

Goya Awards

Year	Title	Category	Result	Ref.
2008	The Orphanage	Best New Director	Won	
2013	The Impossible	Best Director	Won	
2017	A Monster Calls	Best Director	Won	
2024	Society of the Snow	Best Film	Won	
2024	Society of the Snow	Best Director	Won	
2024	Society of the Snow	Best Adapted Screenplay	Nominated	

Other awards

Year	Title	Award	Category	Result	Ref.
2012	The Impossible	Detroit Film Critics Society	Best Director	Nominated	
2013	The Impossible	Gaudí Awards	Best Director	Won	
2013	The Impossible	Capri Hollywood International Film Festival	Capri Director Award	Won	
2013	The Impossible	Capri Hollywood International Film Festival	Capri European Director Award	Won	
2013	The Impossible	Cinema Writers Circle Awards	Best Director	Nominated	
2017	A Monster Calls	Gaudí Awards	Best Director	Won	
2017	A Monster Calls	Feroz Awards	Best Director	Nominated	
2023	Society of the Snow	San Sebastián International Film Festival	City of Donostia / San Sebastian Audience Award for Best Film	Won	
2023	Society of the Snow	Mill Valley Film Festival	¡Viva el cine! - Narrative	Won	
2023	Society of the Snow	Middleburg Film Festival	Audience Award for International Feature	Won	
2023	Society of the Snow	Washington D.C. Area Film Critics Association Awards	Best Foreign Language Film	Nominated	
2023	Society of the Snow	Forqué Awards	Best Film	Nominated	
2023	Society of the Snow	Dallas–Fort Worth Film Critics Association	Best Foreign Language Film	4th Place	
2024	Society of the Snow	Astra Film Awards	Best International Feature	Nominated	
2024	Society of the Snow	Astra Film Awards	Best International Filmmaker	Won	
2024	Society of the Snow	Critics' Choice Awards	Best Foreign Language Film	Nominated	
2024	Society of the Snow	Feroz Awards	Best Drama Film	Nominated	
2024	Society of the Snow	Feroz Awards	Best Director	Won	
2024	Society of the Snow	Carmen Awards	Best Non-Andalusian Produced Film	Won	
2024	Society of the Snow	Gaudí Awards	Best European Film	Won	
2024	Society of the Snow	CEC Medals	Best Film	Won	
2024	Society of the Snow	CEC Medals	Best Director	Nominated	
2024	Society of the Snow	CEC Medals	Best Adapted Screenplay	Won	
2024	Society of the Snow	Satellite Awards	Best Motion Picture – International	Nominated	
