= Adar (The Lord of the Rings: The Rings of Power) =

- The Lord of the Rings: The Rings of Power episode
- Cover art for the episode's soundtrack album
- Episode no.: Season 1 Episode 3
- Directed by: Wayne Che Yip
- Written by: Jason Cahill; Justin Doble
- Cinematography by: Aaron Morton
- Editing by: Stefan Grube; Cheryl Potter
- Original release date: September 9, 2022
- Running time: 69 minutes

Additional cast
- Augustus Prew as Médhor; Simon Merrells as Revion; Anthony Crum as Ontamo; Alex Tarrant as Valandil; Beau Cassidy as Dilly Brandyfoot; Thusitha Jayasundera as Malva; Maxine Cunliffe as Vilma; Joseph Mawle as Adar; Jed Brophy as Vrath; Antonio Te Maioha as the sail master; Edward Clendon as Lurka; Luke Hawker as Magrot; Phil Grieve as Bazur; Phil Vaughan as the smithy; Jason Hood as Tamar

Episode chronology
← Previous "Adrift"	Next → "The Great Wave"
- The Lord of the Rings: The Rings of Power season 1

"Adar" is the third episode of the first season of the American fantasy television series The Lord of the Rings: The Rings of Power, which is based on J. R. R. Tolkien's history of Middle-earth. It was written by Jason Cahill and Justin Doble, and directed by Wayne Che Yip.

The series is set thousands of years before Tolkien's novel The Lord of the Rings (1954–55), during the Second Age of Middle-earth. This episode introduces some of the story's key cultures: the High Men of Númenor and the Orcs. Each culture was defined through designs, dialects, and music, and introduced at a time of change for their people. A lot of focus was put on the design of Númenor, which had not been seen in previous Tolkien adaptations. Filming for the first season took place in New Zealand, and work on episodes beyond the first two began in January 2021. Production wrapped for the season in August 2021. The design of the Orcs' Warg was based on chihuahuas.

"Adar" premiered on the streaming service Amazon Prime Video on September 9, 2022. It was estimated to have high viewership and received generally positive reviews. The episode received two awards as well as a Primetime Creative Arts Emmy Award nomination for its prosthetic makeup.

== Background ==
The Lord of the Rings: The Rings of Power is based on J. R. R. Tolkien's history of Middle-earth. It is set thousands of years before his novels The Hobbit (1937) and The Lord of the Rings (1954–55). While it is contractually not a continuation of Peter Jackson's The Lord of the Rings (2001–2003) and The Hobbit (2012–2014) film trilogies, it is intended to be visually consistent with them, and the first season was produced in New Zealand like Jackson's films were. J. D. Payne and Patrick McKay were hired to develop the series and serve as its showrunners, with Wayne Che Yip set to direct four episodes of the first season.

The series covers the major events of Middle-earth's Second Age. Amazon did not acquire the rights to Tolkien's main Second Age writings, so the writers identified references to the period in The Hobbit, The Lord of the Rings, and the latter's appendices, and created a story that bridges those passages. The Second Age begins after the defeat of the "Dark Lord" Morgoth, when his army of Orcs are scattered and his lieutenant Sauron is in hiding. The large cast of characters includes Elves, Dwarves, Men, and Harfoots, the last being precursors to the diminutive Hobbits from The Hobbit and The Lord of the Rings.

== Plot ==
The Elf Arondir is captured by Orcs and taken to a series of trenches that captives are being forced to dig through the Southlands. These trenches allow the Orcs, who are sensitive to sunlight, to move during the day. Arondir finds that his fellow Elves Médhor and Revion have also been captured, and they plan their escape. When Revion refuses to cut down a tree in their path, the Orcs kill Médhor. Arondir reluctantly agrees to cut down the tree. He sees that the surrounding area has become poisoned and desolate.

Across the Sundering Seas, the Elf Galadriel and her new human companion Halbrand are found by sea captain Elendil, who takes them to the island kingdom of Númenor. Relations between the Men of the island and the Elves have grown strained, and Queen Regent Míriel denies Galadriel's request for a ship back to Middle-earth. Elendil is assigned to watch over Galadriel, and he takes her to the kingdom's Hall of Lore.

Halbrand gets into a fight with some Númenóreans and is imprisoned. Galadriel finds him and reveals what she has learned: the mark of Sauron is a map of the Southlands, where a new realm for evil forces is planned; and Halbrand is the true king of the Southlands, descended from a Man who united the Southland tribes and was loyal to Morgoth. She asks him to return to Middle-earth with her to redeem both of their bloodlines. Meanwhile, Elendil's son Isildur nears the end of his training as a naval cadet, but is considering postponing his graduation at the urging of his brother Anárion, against Elendil's wishes.

The evening before the Harfoots' next migration, the Stranger accidentally reveals himself while trying to read some star maps. The shocked Harfoots consider exiling young Nori Brandyfoot for helping him, but she is forgiven because of her age. The next day, the Brandyfoots struggle to keep up with the migration due to Largo, Nori's father, who has an injured ankle. The Stranger follows them and helps with their cart.

Arondir, Revion, and some other Elvish captives attempt to escape from the Orcs when the Sun is highest. The Orcs send a Warg to attack them, which Arondir kills. Revion makes it out of the trench but is killed by archers. Arondir is unable to get free and is brought before the mysterious leader of the Orcs, Adar.

== Production ==
=== Writing ===
This episode introduces the island kingdom of Númenor, one of the key locations in the Second Age. The design team put a lot of focus on getting the design of the city right.

The episode was written by Jason Cahill and Justin Doble. After the first two episodes did a lot of worldbuilding and introduced a lot of different "worlds", the showrunners said the third episode introduces the "biggest world yet" in the island kingdom of Númenor. They said visiting Númenor was one of the key reasons for making a series set in the Second Age, calling it a major Tolkien location with important lore, characters, and ideas, that had not been seen in previous adaptations. The writers referred to the episode as a second pilot because it establishes so much of the Númenórean world. Doble felt there was a lot of exposition required before they could focus on the Númenórean characters in future episodes. Each group of characters in the series is introduced at "a time of enormous change in their worlds" which the showrunners hoped would make the series more dramatic. This includes the Númenóreans, who are "at a tipping point" in their politics. Executive producer Lindsey Weber explained that the Númenóreans "were given the island by the Elves. And half of the population or so feels very indebted and connected to Elven ways, and half or so feel that they are their own people who do things in the Númenórean way". Because of this, the arrival of Galadriel on the island has a big impact on their society, with the showrunners saying her arrival "is going to set all those conflicts simmering".

The episode's title, "Adar", is the word for "father" in Sindarin, one of Tolkien's constructed languages for the Elves. It is the name given to the leader of the Orcs in the series, who makes a brief, out-of-focus appearance at the end of this episode. The tunnels that are being dug by the Orcs through the beautiful landscape of the Southlands were inspired by the trenches of World War I. The scene where Arondir reluctantly cuts down a tree was originally improvised by actor Ismael Cruz Córdova during his audition for the series. He explained that cutting down a tree is one of the most difficult things an Elf can do due to their spiritual connection to nature, and he felt this only added to the character's struggles of losing his friend and father figure in the episode.

=== Casting ===
The season's cast includes Cynthia Addai-Robinson as Míriel, Maxim Baldry as Isildur, Morfydd Clark as Galadriel, Ismael Cruz Córdova as Arondir, Trystan Gravelle as Pharazôn, Lenny Henry as Sadoc Burrows, Ema Horvath as Eärien, Markella Kavenagh as Elanor "Nori" Brandyfoot, Lloyd Owen as Elendil, Megan Richards as Poppy Proudfellow, Dylan Smith as Largo Brandyfoot, Charlie Vickers as Halbrand, Daniel Weyman as the Stranger, and Sara Zwangobani as Marigold Brandyfoot. Also starring in the episode are Augustus Prew as Médhor, Simon Merrells as Revion, Anthony Crum as Ontamo, Alex Tarrant as Valandil, Beau Cassidy as Dilly Brandyfoot, Thusitha Jayasundera as Malva, Maxine Cunliffe as Vilma, Joseph Mawle as Adar, Jed Brophy as Vrath, Antonio Te Maioha as the sail master, Edward Clendon as Lurka, Luke Hawker as Magrot, Phil Grieve as Bazur, Phil Vaughan as the smithy, and Jason Hood as Tamar. Robert Strange plays an unnamed Orc in the episode.

=== Design ===
One of the "guideposts" that production designer Ramsey Avery was given when he joined the series was for each Middle-earth culture to be easily identifiable; a "war room" was assembled where the design language for each culture was defined, including for the High Men and the Orcs. Dialect coach Leith McPherson, returning from the Hobbit films, established different dialects for each culture. Daniel Reeve, who was responsible for calligraphy and maps on the films, returned to do the same for the series and also to invent new writing systems. Wētā Workshop created props, weapons, and prosthetics for the season.

Payne, McKay, and Avery put a lot of focus on the designs for Númenor, and the showrunners said they were obsessed with getting it right and depicting Númenor as the "greatest kingdom of Men that ever existed". Avery worked closely with Yip on the designs before confirming them with the showrunners. They planned the entire city of Armenelos, with different layers of architecture based on Tolkien's history of Númenor. The production had use of seven stages and multiple backlot spaces across Auckland Film Studios, Kumeu Film Studios, and Kelly Park Film Studios; Kelly Park is a former equestrian center where they could dig into the dirt floor. The main set for Armenelos was almost 300,000 square feet (28,000 m^{2}). Described as "an entire seaside city", it took four or five months to build on the backlot at Kumeu.

=== Filming ===
Production on episodes beyond the first two began in January 2021, under the working title Untitled Amazon Project or simply UAP, following an extended filming break that began due to the COVID-19 pandemic. Yip directed the episode, and confirmed that he had begun filming his episodes by March. Aaron Morton was the cinematographer for Yip's episodes. Filming for the season wrapped on August 2.

Location filming for the entrance to Númenor's harbor took place at an unnamed beach in the South Island of New Zealand that was only accessible by boat or helicopter. This was chosen because the surrounding rock formations matched with concept art of "King Stones" at the harbor's entrance. Yip shot a lot of the Númenor scenes with the camera pointing up from Galadriel and Halbrand's perspectives, to show the large scale of the city. When Galadriel rides with Elendil to the Númenórean Hall of Law, Yip wanted to capture her pure joy at riding a horse and exploring the island. Clark said filming the sequence on a beach in New Zealand was a dream.

Vic Armstrong supervised the action sequences and was lead second unit director. Simon Raby was also a second unit director for the episode. Cordova spent months preparing for the episode's fight sequence and was intent on doing all of the stunts himself. Yip said they wanted to find action movements that were specific to Elves, but they were cautious about making them "feel too superhuman" or going for "style over content. They're getting out of a situation in an Elf-like way, not creating a situation just so that we could do Elf stuff". For a stunt where Arondir leaps up and collapses an Orc structure, the canopy was rigged with mechanical releases so it could drop in time with Cordova's jump. Cordova said the jump was a struggle for him due to his fear of heights, and he was expecting to spend a lot of time on it due to the complexity. To his surprise, it was filmed in a single take. Another stunt in the sequence required performers to pull on the victim of the attacking Warg to create the correct movements before the creature was added by the visual effects team.

=== Visual effects ===
Concept art of the Warg that Arondir fights in the episode. The design was based on chihuahuas.

Visual effects for the episode were created by Industrial Light & Magic (ILM), Wētā FX, Method Studios, Rodeo FX, Cause and FX, Atomic Arts, and Cantina Creative. The different vendors were overseen by visual effects supervisor Jason Smith. Rodeo handled much of the Harfoot storyline, including environment augmentation, scale work, and fire and magic effects. ILM was responsible for the ocean effects throughout the season, and created the environments for Númenor. For the introduction to the latter, Yip felt going straight to a wide establishing shot would be overwhelming for the audience and stop them from seeing all the details of the city. He constructed the sequence so that it would reveal parts of the city first before expanding to wider shots once the ship reaches the harbor. The visual effects team used aerial photography of different European cities as reference for these shots. Payne said seeing the completed effects for this sequence, after the long design process for Númenor, was when he felt they had reached "the thing we've been trying to get to".

When approaching the wolf-like Warg that attacks Arondir, Smith did not want to copy the Wargs that had previously been seen in the films. The Wargs in the Lord of the Rings film trilogy were based on hyenas while those seen in the Hobbit film trilogy were more like wolves. For the series, Smith asked "What would an Orc's pet giant dog monster be?", and after various designs and researching footage of real dogs he settled on the idea of scaling up the "pure hate" of a chihuahua into a 5.5 feet (1.7 m) tall creature that is 800 pounds (360 kg) of muscle. He felt the familiarity that came with this made the creature even more horrific. Wētā created the Warg, and used footage of different carnivorous animals as reference for animating its movements. For instance, a moment where the Warg licks its mouth was based on a wolf doing the same movement. Smith said these references added a realistic messiness to the sequence.

=== Music ===
Musicians Janet Roddick, David Donaldson, and Steve Roche, who form the group Plan 9, and their collaborator David Long returned from the films to provide music during filming, including diegetic music for the streets of Númenor. Composer Bear McCreary began work in July 2021, and started by composing the main themes for the series. He wrote an "anthem" for each culture and then created individual character themes that relate to their culture's music in different ways. The third episode's score introduces several of these: themes for the Orcs and their leader, Adar; and themes for Númenor as well as Elendil and his family.

The Harfoots participate in a ceremony in the episode where they dress up in costumes and walk through the trees. McCreary scored the start of the sequence with low male vocals to play on the mystery before the scene reveals that it is the Harfoots and the music transitions to sounds from the Harfoot theme. McCreary composed the music for the sequence to be diegetic, as if the Harfoots were making the music themselves, and matched it with the steps and chanting of the actors in each shot. Similar to the Worm attack in the previous episode, "Adrift", McCreary spent nearly a week on the action sequence in this episode between the Elves and the Orcs.

The Lord of the Rings: The Rings of Power (Season One, Episode Three: Adar – Amazon Original Series Soundtrack)

Film score by Bear McCreary
- Released: September 8, 2022
- Genres: Orchestra; choir; world
- Length: 51:29
- Languages: English; Constructed languages
- Labels: Amazon; Mondo

Bear McCreary chronology
Adrift (2022)	Adar (2022)	The Great Wave (2022)

A soundtrack album featuring McCreary's score for the episode was released digitally on the streaming service Amazon Music on September 8, 2022. McCreary said the album contained "virtually every second of score" from the episode. It was added to other music streaming services after the full first season was released. A CD featuring the episode's music is included in a limited edition box set collection for the season from Mondo, Amazon Music, and McCreary's label Sparks & Shadows. The box set was released on April 26, 2024, and includes a journal written by McCreary which details the creation of the episode's score. All music was composed by Bear McCreary:

Track listing
No.	Title	Length
1.	"Into Númenor"	8:26
2.	"The Tests of Isildur and Eärien"	6:02
3.	"In the Trench"	4:43
4.	"To the Hall of Lore"	3:49
5.	"The Successor"	3:26
6.	"Nobody Walks Alone"	5:49
7.	"We Wait For You"	6:00
8.	"Both Our Bloodlines"	5:25
9.	"Breaking Chains"	4:12
10.	"Street Musicians" (Bonus Track)	3:37
Total length:		51:29

== Release ==
"Adar" premiered on the streaming service Amazon Prime Video on September 9, 2022. It was released at the same time around the world, in more than 240 countries and territories. For two weeks leading up to the second season's premiere on August 29, 2024, the first season was made available for free on the streaming service Samsung TV Plus in the US, Canada, Brazil, the United Kingdom, and Germany.

Ahead of the third season's release in November 2026, a home media release for the first two seasons was announced. Each release features the eight episodes of the respective season along with behind-the-scenes content. They were released on 4K Ultra HD, Blu-ray, and DVD on November 3, and in limited edition 4K UHD SteelBook—with Amazon exclusive collectable art cards—on December 1.

== Reception ==
=== Viewership ===
Whip Media, which tracks viewership data for the 21 million worldwide users of its TV Time app, calculated that for the week ending September 11, two days after the episode's debut, The Rings of Power was the third-highest original streaming series for US viewership behind Netflix's Cobra Kai and Disney+'s She-Hulk: Attorney at Law. JustWatch, a guide to streaming content with access to data from more than 20 million users around the world, placed the series second on its list of top 10 streaming series in the US for the week ending September 11, after Adult Swim's Rick and Morty. Nielsen Media Research, which records streaming viewership on US television screens, estimated that the series was watched for 1.2 billion minutes during the week ending September 11. This was on par with viewership from the previous week, but the series dropped from first to fourth-place on the company's list of top streaming series and films. Parrot Analytics determines audience "demand expressions" based on various data sources, including social media activity and comments on rating platforms. During the week ending September 16, the company calculated that The Rings of Power was 30 times more in demand than the average US streaming series, placing it eighth on the company's top 10 list for the week.

=== Critical response ===
On review aggregator Rotten Tomatoes, 86% of 35 critics gave the episode a positive review and the average of rated reviews was 7.3 out of 10. The critics consensus reads, "The Rings of Power risks straining viewers' patience by expanding its scope instead of meaningfully progressing its established story threads, but 'Adar' is just as impressive as its predecessors."

=== Accolades ===
Ismael Cruz Córdova was named an honorable mention for TVLine's "Performer of the Week" for the week of September 5, 2022, for his performance in this episode. The site highlighted Arondir's fight against the Warg, specifically "the fire in Ismael Cruz Córdova's eyes and the mighty roar from his lungs as the Elf fought back... Arondir is quickly becoming one of our favorites to watch" in the series.

Accolades received by the The Lord of the Rings: The Rings of Power episode "Adar"
Award	Date of ceremony	Category	Recipient(s)	Result	Ref.
Art Directors Guild Awards	February 18, 2023	Excellence in Production Design for a One-Hour Period or Fantasy Single-Camera Series	Ramsey Avery	Won	
Primetime Creative Arts Emmy Awards	January 7, 2024	Outstanding Prosthetic Makeup	Jason Docherty, Dan Perry, Mark Knight, and Simon Rose	Nominated	
Visual Effects Society Awards	February 15, 2023	Outstanding Created Environment in an Episode, Commercial, or Real-Time Project	Dan Wheaton, Nico Delbecq, Dan LeTarte, and Julien Gauthier (for Númenor City)	Won	

== Companion media ==
An episode of the official aftershow Deadline's Inside the Ring: LOTR: The Rings of Power for "Adar" was released on September 10, 2022. Hosted by Deadline Hollywood's Dominic Patten and Anthony D'Alessandro, it features exclusive "footage and insights" for the episode, plus interviews with cast members Owen, Clark, Vickers, Addai-Robinson, Gravelle, Kavenagh, Richards, Weyman, and Zwangobani, as well as Yip, Doble, and McCreary. On October 14, The Official The Lord of the Rings: The Rings of Power Podcast was released on Amazon Music. Hosted by actress Felicia Day, the third episode is dedicated to "Adar" and features Vickers, Payne, and McKay. On November 21, a bonus segment featuring behind-the-scenes footage from the episode was added to Prime Video's X-Ray feature as part of a series titled "The Making of The Rings of Power".
