= The Lord of the Rings: The Rings of Power season 1 =

2022 television season

The Lord of the Rings: The Rings of Power
- Season 1
- Home media cover art
- Showrunners: J. D. Payne; Patrick McKay
- No. of episodes: 8

Release
- Original network: Amazon Prime Video
- Original release: September 1 – October 14, 2022

Season chronology
- Next → Season 2

The first season of the American fantasy television series The Lord of the Rings: The Rings of Power is based on J. R. R. Tolkien's history of Middle-earth, primarily material from the appendices of the novel The Lord of the Rings (1954–55). Set thousands of years before the novel in Middle-earth's Second Age, the series begins in a time of relative peace and follows various characters as they face the re-emergence of darkness. The season includes a mystery about the whereabouts of the Dark Lord Sauron and concludes with the forging of the first Rings of Power. It was produced by Amazon Studios in association with New Line Cinema and with J. D. Payne and Patrick McKay as showrunners.

Amazon acquired the television rights to The Lord of the Rings in November 2017. Payne and McKay were set to develop the series in July 2018. They intended for it to be visually consistent with Peter Jackson's The Lord of the Rings (2001–2003) and The Hobbit (2012–2014) film trilogies, despite being separate from them. A large international cast was hired and each Middle-earth culture was defined through designs, dialects, and music. Filming began in February 2020 in New Zealand, where the films were produced, but was put on hold in March due to the COVID-19 pandemic. Production resumed in September and wrapped in August 2021, taking place in Auckland and on location around the country. J. A. Bayona, Wayne Che Yip, and Charlotte Brändström directed episodes. Special effects company Wētā Workshop and visual effects vendor Wētā FX returned from the films.

The season premiered on the streaming service Amazon Prime Video on September 1, 2022, with its first two episodes. This followed a marketing campaign that attempted to win over dissatisfied Tolkien fans. The other six episodes were released weekly until October 14. Amazon said the season was the most-watched of any Prime Video original series and third-party analytics companies also estimated viewership to be high. Initial reviews were generally positive, particularly for the visuals, but there were mixed feelings on the season's Tolkien connections and criticisms for its structure. Commentary about the season focused on vocal responses from Tolkien fans, online backlash to the diverse cast, and comparisons with concurrent fantasy series House of the Dragon. The season received various accolades including six Primetime Creative Arts Emmy Award nominations.

== Episodes ==
No. overall	No. in season	Title	Directed by	Written by	Original release date
1	1	"A Shadow of the Past"	J. A. Bayona	J. D. Payne & Patrick McKay	September 1, 2022
After the Dark Lord Morgoth is defeated, the Elf Finrod dies searching for Morgoth's servant Sauron. Finrod's sister Galadriel vows to continue the search and finds an abandoned fortress in the northern wastelands of Forodwaith which bears Sauron's mark. Her companions insist on returning to the Elven capital Lindon where High King Gil-galad proclaims the war against Morgoth's forces to be over. He grants Galadriel and her company the honor of sailing to Valinor where they can live an eternal life at peace. In the Southlands of Middle-earth, Elves watch over Men descended from allies of Morgoth. To the disapproval of the other Elves and Men, the Elf Arondir has grown close with the human healer Bronwyn. Together they discover that the village of Hordern has been destroyed, while Bronwyn's son Theo finds a broken sword bearing Sauron's mark in the barn of tavern owner Waldreg. Near Valinor, Galadriel chooses to turn back and continue the search for Sauron, jumping from the ship into the Sundering Seas. At the same time, the Harfoot Nori Brandyfoot discovers a strange man inside a meteor crater.
2	2	"Adrift"	J. A. Bayona	Gennifer Hutchison	September 1, 2022
Swimming back to Middle-earth, Galadriel comes across a raft with human survivors of a shipwreck. They are attacked by a sea monster and only one survives—Halbrand of the Southlands, who is fleeing from Orcs. He and Galadriel work together to survive a storm. Nori and her friend Poppy Proudfellow hide "The Stranger" from the other Harfoots and give him food and shelter. He does not speak their language but uses fireflies and apparent magic to indicate that he is searching for a constellation of stars that Nori does not recognize. Arondir investigates tunnels beneath Hordern and is captured. Bronwyn returns to her own village, Tirharad, where an Orc attacks her and Theo. They kill it and convince the rest of the town to leave for the tower of Ostirith. Gil-galad sends the half-Elf Elrond to Eregion to assist the great Elven-smith Celebrimbor who plans to build a powerful new forge. Elrond suggests they seek help from the Dwarves and goes to his friend Prince Durin IV in Khazad-dûm. Durin IV is angry that Elrond has not visited in 20 years, but his wife Disa convinces him to hear Elrond's proposal.
3	3	"Adar"	Wayne Che Yip	Jason Cahill and Justin Doble	September 9, 2022
Galadriel and Halbrand are picked up by a ship captained by Elendil. He takes them to Númenor, an island kingdom ruled by Men descended from Elrond's brother Elros. Relations between the island and the Elves have grown strained, and Queen Regent Míriel denies Galadriel's request for a ship back to Middle-earth. Galadriel visits a library of lore with Elendil and discovers that the mark of Sauron is actually a map of the Southlands where a new realm for evil forces is planned. She also learns that Halbrand, who is imprisoned after fighting some Númenóreans, is heir to the throne of the Southlands. In the Southlands, Arondir has been captured by Orcs and taken to a construction camp digging underground passages. His Elven compatriots have also been captured and are killed during an attempted prison revolt. Arondir is taken to the leader of the Orcs who they call Adar, which means "father". As the Harfoots prepare for their seasonal migration, the Stranger is revealed to them all while trying to read some star maps. They let him join them and he pushes Nori's wagon since her father is injured.
4	4	"The Great Wave"	Wayne Che Yip	Stephany Folsom and J. D. Payne & Patrick McKay	September 16, 2022
Míriel refuses to help defend the Southlands and has Galadriel imprisoned. Adar releases Arondir with a message for the Southlanders: forsake their claim to the area and swear fealty to Adar, or be destroyed. Theo returns to Tirharad for supplies and is attacked by Orcs who are searching for the broken sword. Arondir saves him. Waldreg tells Theo that the sword is a gift for Men from Sauron. In Eregion, the Elves and Dwarves begin building the forge. Elrond learns that Durin IV has been mining a powerful new ore, mithril, and promises to keep this secret. Galadriel escapes prison and goes to the tower of King Tar-Palantir, who is in ill health. Míriel explains that there was a rebellion because the king wanted to renew relations with the Elves, and Míriel was placed on the throne. This gave her access to a palantír seeing stone that showed her a vision of Númenor being destroyed in a great tsunami. She believes Galadriel will bring this about, but when the petals of Númenor's White Tree begin to fall Míriel sees this as a sign from the Valar and instead decides to accompany Galadriel to the Southlands.
5	5	"Partings"	Wayne Che Yip	Justin Doble	September 23, 2022
The Harfoots are saved from a wolf attack by the Stranger, who injures himself using magic to scare the wolves off. He later uses more magic to heal himself and nearly hurts Nori in the process, frightening her. In the tower of Ostirith, Waldreg convinces half of the Southlander refugees that they will be better off joining the Orcs. Theo shows the broken sword to Arondir who believes that it is some sort of key designed to enslave the Southlanders. In Lindon, Gil-galad reveals to Elrond that he knows of the existence of mithril and believes it can counteract the fading power of the Elves in Middle-earth. Elrond tells Durin IV and the pair return to Khazad-dûm to try convince his father, King Durin III, to help the Elves. As the Númenóreans prepare to depart for Middle-earth, Tar-Palantir warns Míriel not to go. Galadriel tells her that Halbrand will be accompanying them to claim the throne of the Southlands, but he does not want to and accuses Galadriel of using him. Galadriel later apologizes and opens up to him, and Halbrand eventually agrees to go. Númenor's ships depart for the Southlands.
6	6	"Udûn"	Charlotte Brändström	Nicholas Adams & Justin Doble and J. D. Payne & Patrick McKay	September 30, 2022
Adar and his Orcs find Ostirith abandoned, but this is a trap and Arondir collapses the tower on them. He and the refugees return to Tirharad to prepare for the next assault while Galadriel, Halbrand, and the Númenóreans make their way towards the Southlands. Arondir is unable to destroy the broken sword and hides it instead. That night, a group of Orcs enter Tirharad and are killed by the townspeople, who are horrified to learn that some of the enemies they just killed were the people who followed Waldreg. Orc archers fire on the town and wound Bronwyn. Adar arrives and Theo reveals the location of the broken sword to save Bronwyn's life. Adar attempts to flee as the Númenóreans arrive on horseback and kill or capture the remaining Orcs. Galadriel and Halbrand capture Adar and interrogate him. Halbrand is hailed as the King of the Southlands. Theo realizes that the broken sword is missing: Waldreg has it and uses it to unlock a dam beside Ostirith, sending water through the Orcs' tunnels and into a lava chamber beneath the mountain Orodruin. The resulting eruption covers the Southlands.
7	7	"The Eye"	Charlotte Brändström	Jason Cahill	October 7, 2022
Galadriel wakes up, covered in ash and surrounded by fire, and finds Theo. Míriel loses her eyesight, and Elendil's son Isildur is presumed dead. The Harfoots arrive at their destination, an orchard that has been destroyed by the nearby volcano. The Stranger attempts to fix it but endangers Nori and her sister. Scared, the Harfoots send him away, only to find the orchard regrown the next day. A trio of mysterious women arrive in search of the Stranger and destroy the Harfoots' caravans when Nori attempts to misdirect them. Galadriel and Theo are reunited with Bronwyn, Arondir, and a gravely injured Halbrand. Galadriel takes him to receive Elvish medicine while the Númenóreans depart on their ships. Míriel vows to return for revenge. Meanwhile, Elrond and Durin IV fail to convince Durin III to help the Elves. They are caught mining mithril in secret and Elrond is banished, taking a small piece of mithril with him. Durin IV is stripped of his royal status and Durin III seals the mine. Unbeknownst to them all, a Balrog lives deep below the mine. The Southlands, now a land of Orcs, is renamed Mordor.
8	8	"Alloyed"	Wayne Che Yip	Gennifer Hutchison and J. D. Payne & Patrick McKay	October 14, 2022
The three women find the Stranger and tell him that he is Sauron. Galadriel and Halbrand arrive in Eregion and the latter receives medical attention. As he recovers, he grows interested in Celebrimbor's work and suggests a way to create a small object with Elrond's mithril. Míriel and Elendil return to Númenor to learn that Tar-Palantir has died. The Harfoots find the Stranger and attempt to rescue him from the women. The Stranger, receiving encouragement from Nori, uses magic to banish the women to the unseen world. Regaining some of his memories, he explains to Nori that he is a Wizard and needs to travel east to the land of Rhûn. Nori decides to go with him. Galadriel reviews records on the Kings of the Southlands and realizes that Halbrand is not who he says he is. She confronts him and he reveals himself to be Sauron. She refuses to join him and he flees to Mordor. Choosing not to reveal this, Galadriel encourages Celebrimbor to move forward with the plan but make three objects instead. Elrond finds the records and deduces what happened, but too late: three Rings of Power are forged.

== Cast and characters ==
=== Starring ===
- Morfydd Clark as Galadriel
- Lenny Henry as Sadoc Burrows
- Sara Zwangobani as Marigold Brandyfoot
- Dylan Smith as Largo Brandyfoot
- Markella Kavenagh as Elanor "Nori" Brandyfoot
- Megan Richards as Poppy Proudfellow
- Robert Aramayo as Elrond
- Benjamin Walker as Gil-galad
- Ismael Cruz Córdova as Arondir
- Nazanin Boniadi as Bronwyn
- Tyroe Muhafidin as Theo
- Charles Edwards as Celebrimbor
- Daniel Weyman as the Stranger
- Owain Arthur as Durin IV
- Charlie Vickers as Halbrand
- Sophia Nomvete as Disa
- Lloyd Owen as Elendil
- Cynthia Addai-Robinson as Míriel
- Trystan Gravelle as Pharazôn
- Maxim Baldry as Isildur
- Ema Horvath as Eärien
- Leon Wadham as Kemen

=== Supporting ===
- Amelie Child-Villiers as young Galadriel
- Will Fletcher as Finrod
- Fabian McCallum as Thondir
- Kip Chapman as Rían
- Thusitha Jayasundera as Malva
- Maxine Cunliffe as Vilma
- Beau Cassidy as Dilly Brandyfoot
- Geoff Morrell as Waldreg
- Peter Tait as Tredwill
- Ian Blackburn as Rowan
- Augustus Prew as Médhor
- Simon Merrells as Revion
- Peter Mullan as Durin III
- Anthony Crum as Ontamo
- Alex Tarrant as Valandil
- Joseph Mawle as Adar
- Ken Blackburn as Tar-Palantir
- Edith Poor as the Nomad
- Kali Kopae as the Ascetic
- Bridie Sisson as the Dweller

== Production ==
=== Development ===
Amazon acquired the television rights for J. R. R. Tolkien's The Lord of the Rings (1954–55) in November 2017. The company's streaming service, Amazon Prime Video, gave a multi-season commitment to a series based on the novel and its appendices, to be produced by Amazon Studios in association with New Line Cinema and in consultation with the Tolkien Estate. The budget was expected to be around US$100–150 million per season.

Peter Jackson, director of the Lord of the Rings (2001–2003) and The Hobbit (2012–2014) films, was discussing his involvement with Amazon by April 2018. By early June, he was not expected to be involved, but later that month Amazon Studios head Jennifer Salke said discussions with Jackson were ongoing. The studio was meeting with potential writers and hoped the series could debut in 2021. J. D. Payne and Patrick McKay were hired to develop it in July. They were an unlikely choice, having only done unproduced or uncredited writing at that point. In December, Jackson said he and his producing partners would read scripts and offer notes, but later said this did not happen. Amazon explained that the deal with Tolkien's estate required the company to keep the series distinct from Jackson's films. Amazon executive Sharon Tal Yguado advocated for his involvement, but the estate was against this after not being consulted on Jackson's films. The showrunners attempted to discuss the series with Jackson, and intended for it to be visually consistent with the films.

J. A. Bayona directed the first two episodes of the season and was an executive producer.

After signing an overall deal with Amazon, Game of Thrones (2011–2019) writer Bryan Cogman joined as a consultant in May 2019. Amazon was also interested in having Game of Thrones creators David Benioff and D. B. Weiss consult on the series as part of a potential overall deal, before they signed with Netflix instead. In July, J. A. Bayona was hired to direct the first two episodes and executive produce alongside his producing partner Belén Atienza. Amazon confirmed that Payne and McKay were showrunners and executive producers, and the rest of the creative team was revealed: executive producers Bayona, Atienza, Bruce Richmond, Gene Kelly, Lindsey Weber, and Yguado; producer Ron Ames; costume designer Kate Hawley; production designer Rick Heinrichs; visual effects supervisor Jason Smith; Tolkien scholar Tom Shippey; and illustrator/concept artist John Howe. Hawley and Howe returned from the films, along with special effects company Wētā Workshop and visual effects vendor Wētā FX. Cogman, Kelly, Yguado, Heinrichs, and Shippey left during development for various reasons.

Ramsey Avery was hired as the new production designer around the end of August 2019. He said ten episodes were planned, but this was reduced to eight not long before he joined. Filming was scheduled to begin in January 2020 and was structured into blocks, with the first block covering the first two episodes. Due to concerns that writing and design work would not be ready for the second block, a two-and-a-half month break was planned following the first. By November, this break was expected to last four or five months so the newly ordered second season could be written. Callum Greene, a producer on Jackson's The Hobbit: The Desolation of Smaug (2013), joined as an executive producer by December. Wayne Che Yip was hired as co-executive producer and director for four episodes, with Charlotte Brändström directing the other two. Ames, who oversaw the technical departments, asked Amazon for unlimited cloud-based storage, allowing all technical data and footage to be accessible to crew around the world. The season was the first production to be completely cloud-based, which became crucial when the COVID-19 pandemic began in March 2020. Prime Video announced the series' title, The Lord of the Rings: The Rings of Power, in January 2022.

=== Writing ===
A writers' room opened in Santa Monica, California, by mid-February 2019. It included Payne, McKay, Gennifer Hutchison, Justin Doble, Cogman, Jason Cahill, Stephany Folsom, Helen Shang, and Nicholas Adams. They started each day discussing a quote from Tolkien that inspired them. The scripts were being rewritten by the end of August 2019 when the episode count was reduced from ten to eight.

The series is set in the Second Age of Middle-earth, thousands of years before the Third Age events of Tolkien's The Hobbit (1937) and The Lord of the Rings. The First and Second Ages are primarily explored in Tolkien works that Amazon did not acquire the rights to, so the writers had to identify all of the references to the Second Age in The Hobbit, The Lord of the Rings, and the appendices, and create a story that bridged those passages. One of their earliest ideas was a new "origin story" for the dark land of Mordor, introducing it as the Southlands which are devastated by a volcanic eruption. Another was a being falling from the sky and meeting a halfling; the showrunners believed the series would not feel like Middle-earth without Hobbits and Wizards, and wanted to have a "Tolkienian relationship" between a Wizard and a halfling similar to the characters Gandalf and Frodo Baggins in The Lord of the Rings. Hobbits are associated with the Third Age, so they explored secretive precursors to the Hobbits called Harfoots. One version of Tolkien's history has two Blue Wizards arrive in Middle-earth during the Second Age, which the showrunners used as the basis to include "The Stranger", who is revealed to be a Wizard in the season finale.

Three Rings for the Elven-kings under the sky,
Seven for the Dwarf-lords in their halls of stone,
Nine for Mortal Men doomed to die,
One for the Dark Lord on his dark throne

— Excerpt from the Ring Verse poem by J. R. R. Tolkien. The series introduces the Rings of Power in this order, starting with those for the Elves.

Though the Rings of Power for Elves were made after those for Men and Dwarves in Tolkien's history, the writers chose to follow the more widely-known order used in the Ring Verse poem and focus on the Elven rings first. Tolkien wrote that the power of the Elves in Middle-earth is fading during the Second Age, and it is the Elven rings that slow this. To explain this, the writers determined from Tolkien's writings that the light of the Two Trees of Valinor should counteract the Elves' fading power; the light of the Trees was captured in the Silmarils, powerful jewels from the First Age; and one of the Elven rings contains the rare ore mithril, which has special properties. They suggested a "grand unification theory" in which mithril is created from one of the Silmarils, giving it the power to save the Elves, and is then used to make all three Elven rings. The writers wanted the season's central storylines to justify the "Faustian deal" that the Elves accept when they make the rings: Elrond attempts to reverse the Elves' fading power while Galadriel gathers an army to fight the forces of evil; when they both fail, they turn to the creation of the Rings of Power out of desperation.

One of the Tolkien quotes discussed by the writers was a line from The Lord of the Rings where Galadriel says "I know [the Dark Lord Sauron's] mind, and he gropes ever to know mine". They inferred that the two could have met and wanted to explore that. Believing it could only happen if Sauron was in disguise, which he often is in Tolkien's writings, the showrunners saw an opportunity to have Sauron deceive the audience in the same way that he deceives other characters. They created a new disguise, the human "Halbrand", instead of using his "Annatar" disguise from the books, and hoped Tolkien fans could be surprised as well. McKay said hiding Sauron until the finale meant they were not rushing to focus on his evilness, and could begin the series by introducing the Second Age and its heroic characters.

The writers condensed Tolkien's Second Age timeline from thousands of years to a short period of time. This allowed major human characters from later in the timeline to be introduced in the season, including Isildur and others from Númenor. The showrunners said visiting Númenor, a kingdom of Men that is destroyed near the end of the Second Age, was one of the key reasons for making a Second Age series. The season uses a vision of the future to reveal that Númenor will eventually be destroyed. This was done so all viewers would be aware of the tragic ending that is coming, similar to the film Titanic (1997).

=== Location ===
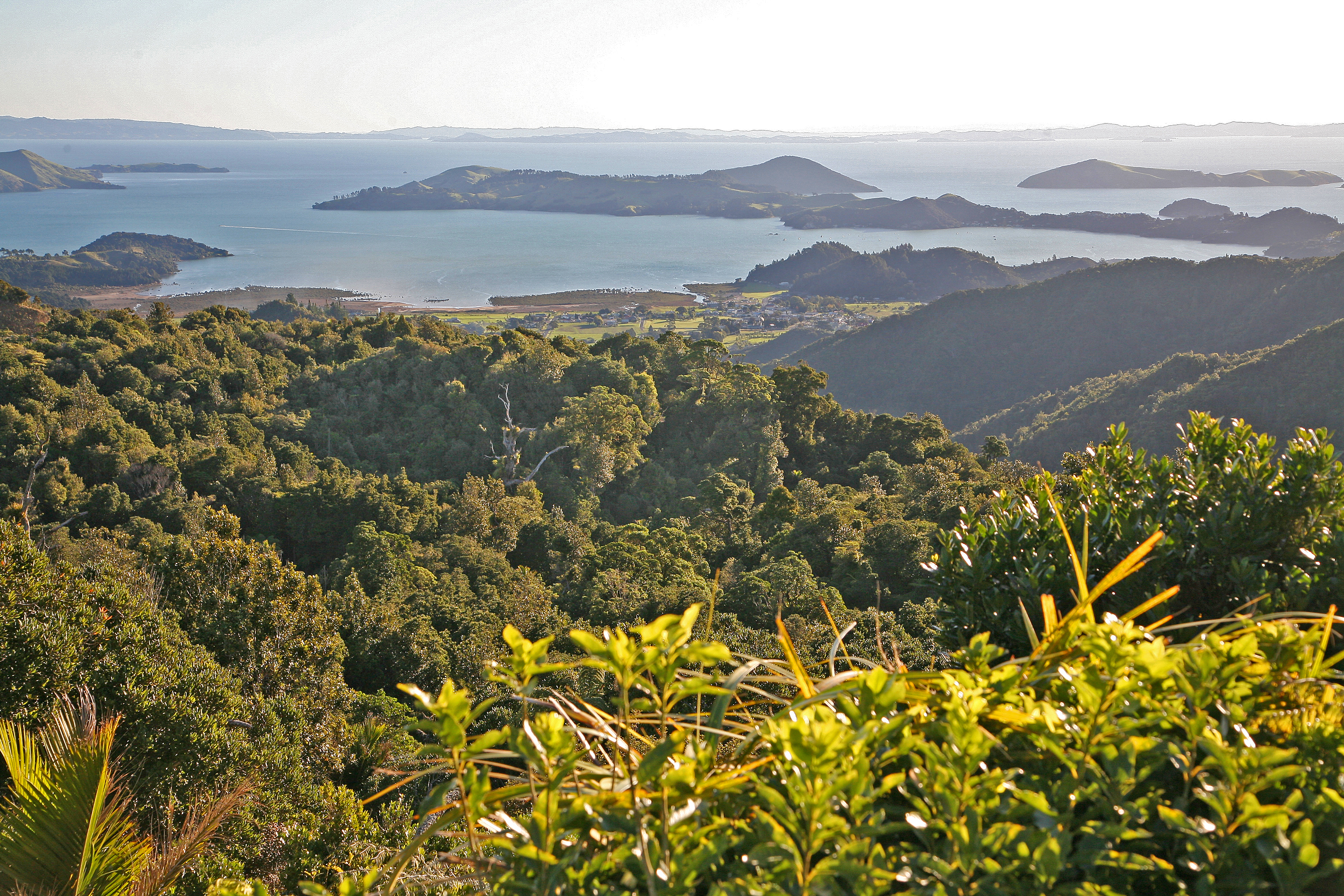
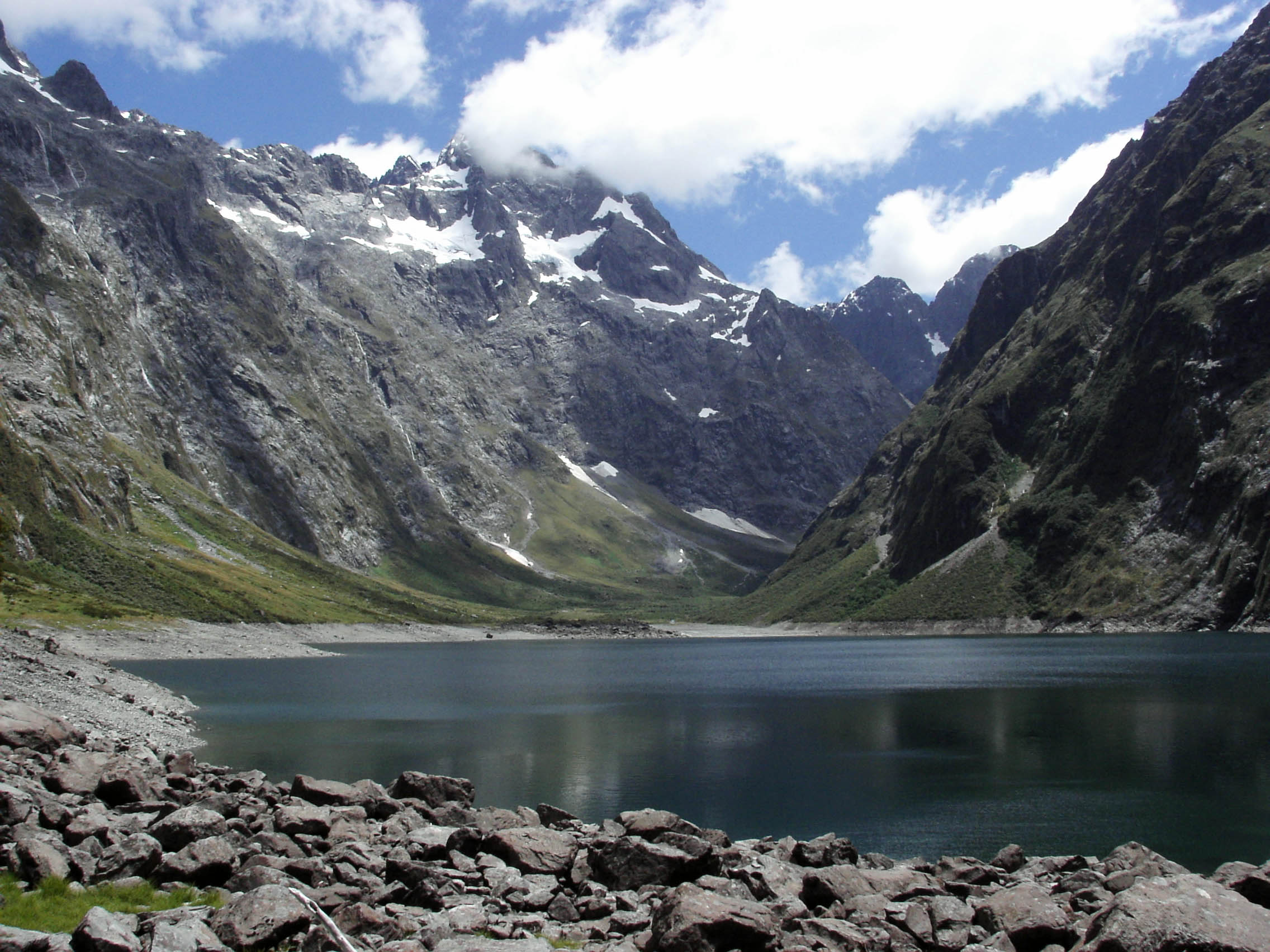
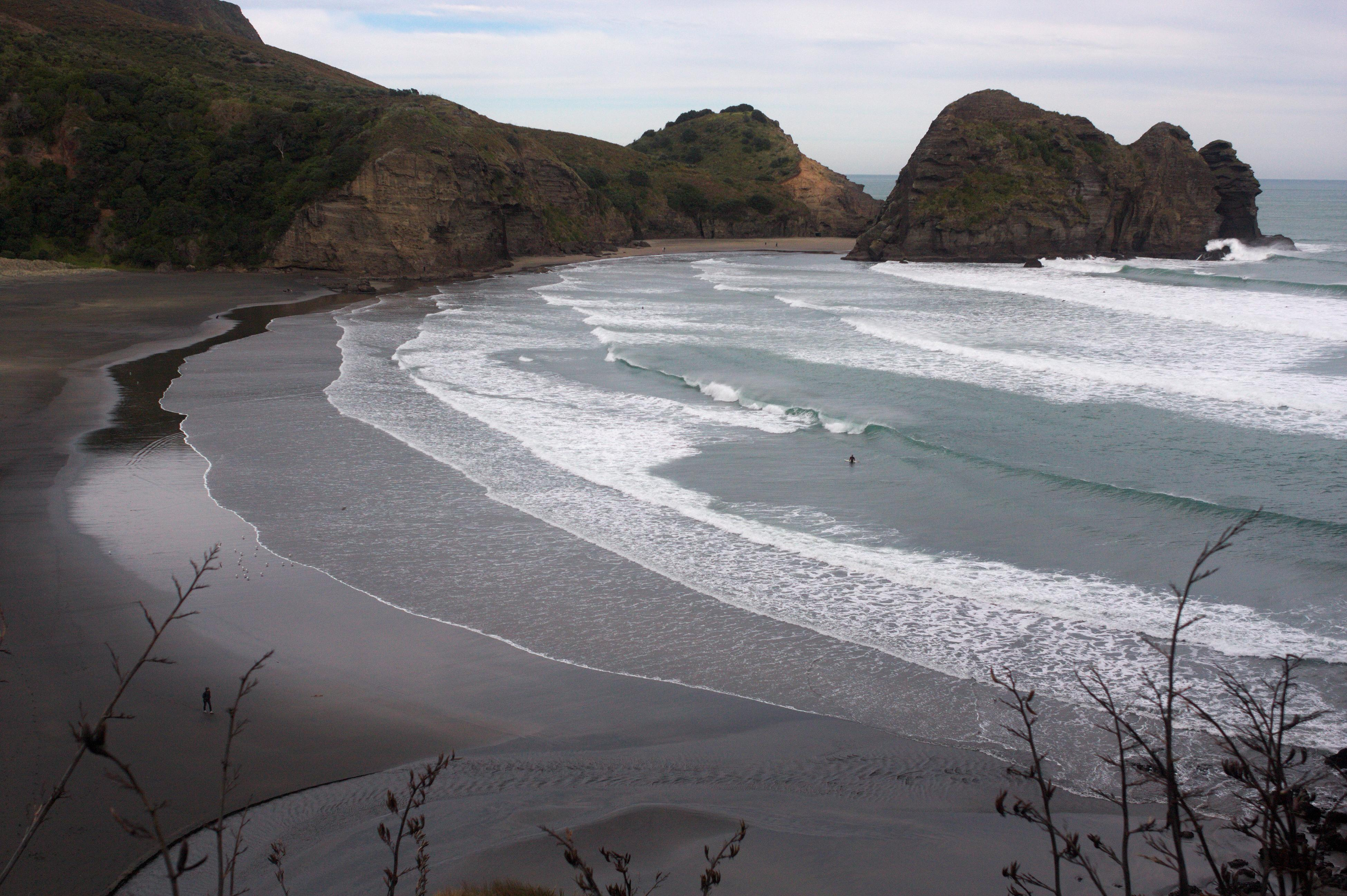
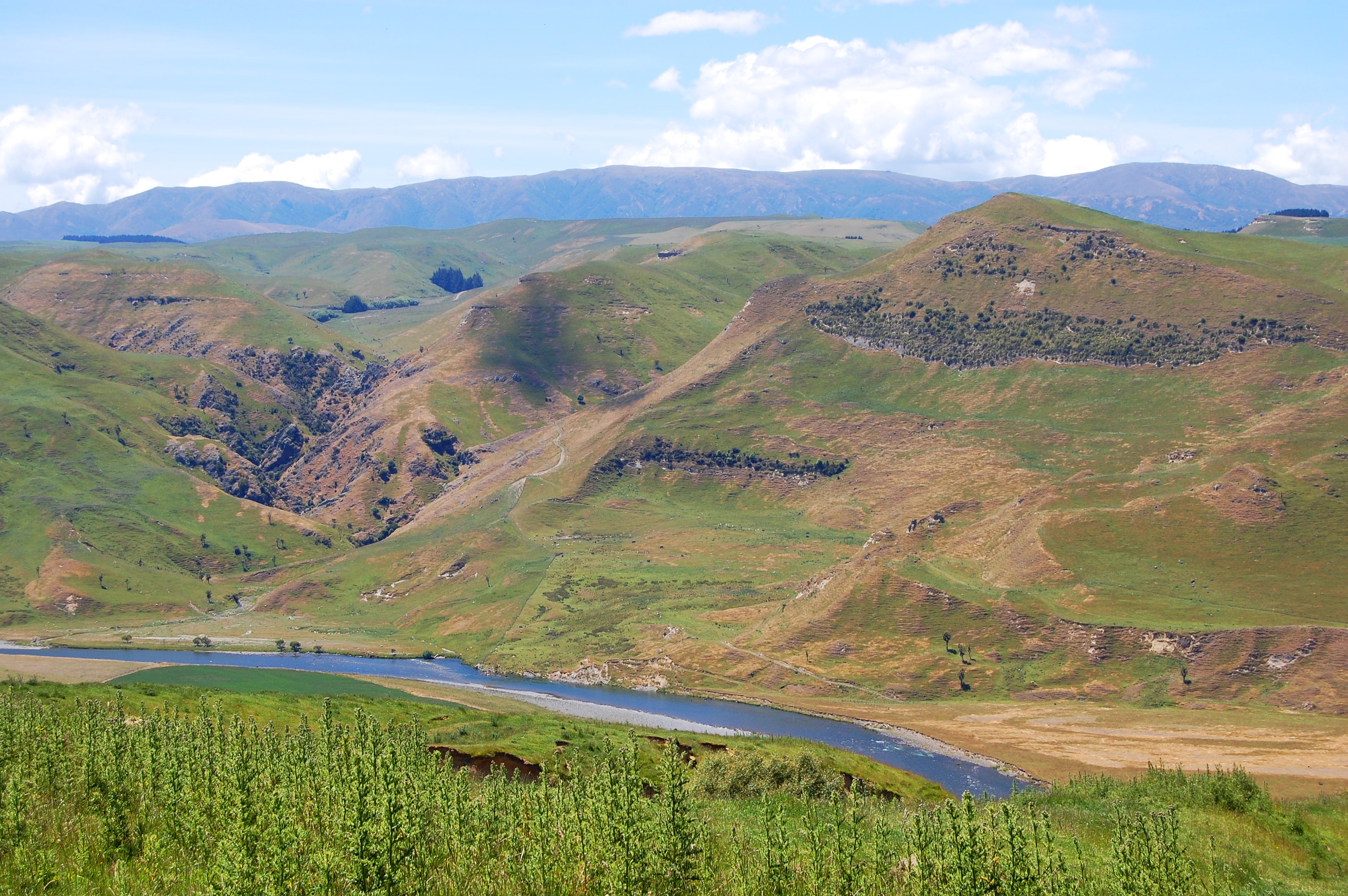
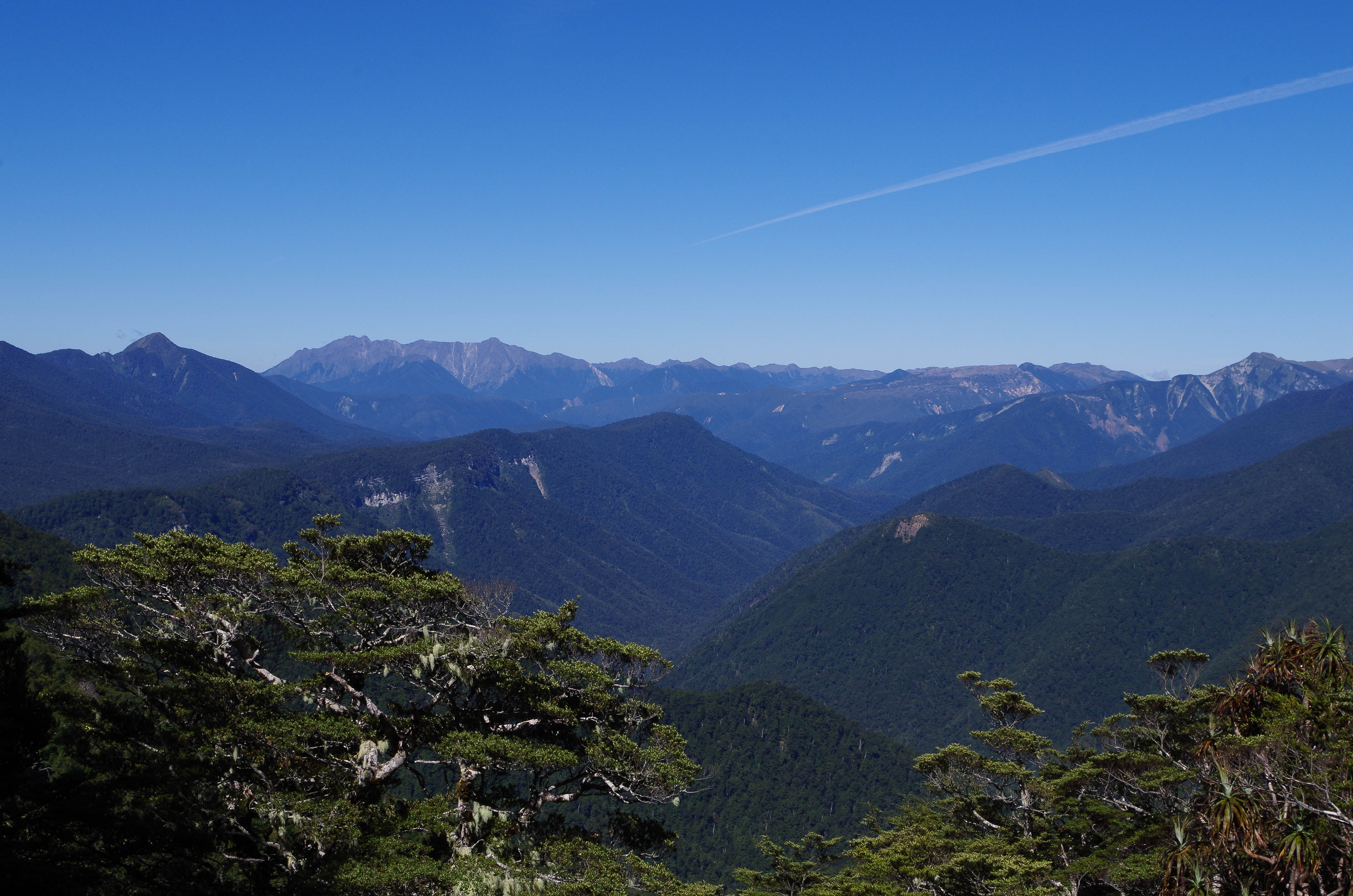
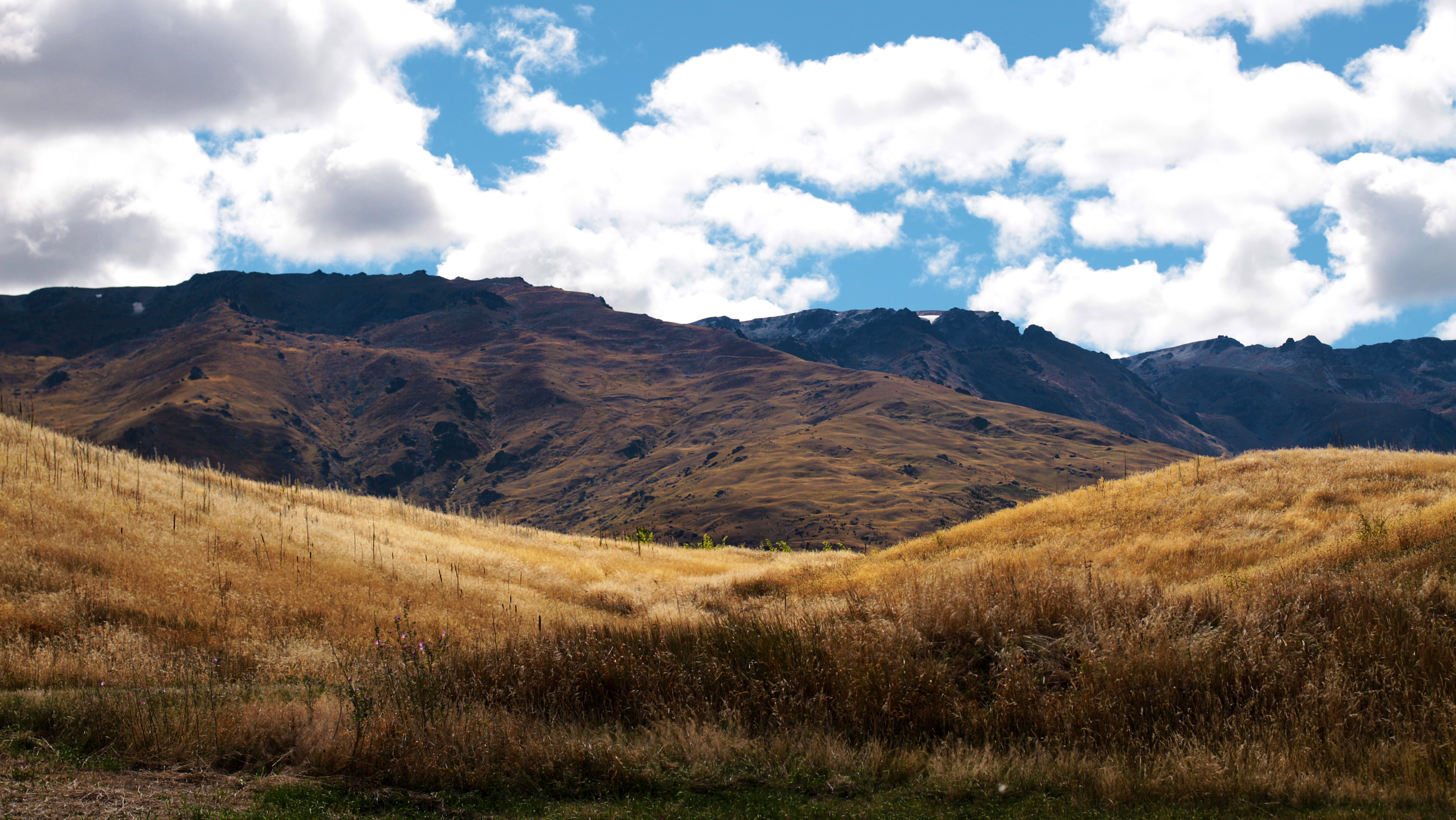
The season was filmed in New Zealand, where the Lord of the Rings films were made. Filming took place in 38 locations around the country, including (left-to-right, top-to-bottom) the Coromandel Peninsula, Fiordland, Piha, Rangitikei, Kahurangi National Park, and Central Otago.

In June 2018, Salke said the series could be produced in New Zealand like the films, but Amazon was willing to film in other countries. Pre-production reportedly began around that time in Auckland, while location scouting took place in Scotland around the Isle of Skye, Portpatrick, Scourie, Perthshire, and Loch Lomond. Amazon held talks with Creative Scotland about using studios that were under construction in Edinburgh, and had a "crisis meeting" with the New Zealand government regarding a lack of available studio space. Amazon ultimately decided to film in New Zealand, and was reportedly influenced by the potential effects of Brexit in Scotland.

Auckland was chosen as the primary location because the films' Wellington studios were being used by the Avatar franchise. Leases at Kumeu Film Studios and Auckland Film Studios took effect in July 2019, and Amazon officially confirmed in September that the series would be filmed in New Zealand. Through the country's Major Screen Production Grant, all film and television productions received a 20 percent tax rebate while projects that offer "significant economic benefits" could negotiate for an additional 5 percent. Amazon signed two Memoranda of Understanding in December 2020 to gain access to the additional amount, allowing Tourism New Zealand to use material from the series and committing to help grow New Zealand's screen sector and economy. Amazon invested NZ$3.5 million (US$2.5 million) in developing connections between the production studios and Auckland service providers, and trained more than 20 inexperienced New Zealanders in visual effects and post-production work.

The New Zealand government revealed in April 2021 that Amazon was spending NZ$650 million (US$465 million) on the season, making it eligible for up to NZ$160 million (US$114 million) in tax rebates. James Hibberd at The Hollywood Reporter said the US$465 million amount likely included additional costs to the season's production budget, including the startup costs of building sets, costumes, and props that would be used in future seasons. Salke confirmed this, describing the cost as a "crazy headline that's fun to click on, but that is really building the infrastructure of what will sustain the whole series". Despite media focus on the large budget, Avery said it was not significantly more than that of the two-and-a-half hour feature films he had worked on, and it had to be spread across eight hour-long episodes.

In his first month in New Zealand, Avery went location scouting around the country. Kevin Spring was the supervising location manager for the season. Because of budget restrictions and logistical issues, filming needed to primarily take place near the Auckland studios. This meant less filming around the country than Avery initially expected. The production also struggled with New Zealand's weather and lack of European-style forests. 38 filming locations were chosen, 15 of which were in Auckland. The others included the Hauraki Gulf, the Coromandel Peninsula, the Denize Bluffs in the King Country, Mount Kidd in Fiordland, Piha, Rangitikei, Kahurangi National Park, Central Otago, and Queenstown.

More than 1,250 New Zealanders were contracted for the season, including 80 percent of its department heads, and around 700 more were indirectly engaged by it. In August 2021, Amazon announced that it was moving production of future seasons to the United Kingdom and would not preserve the terms of the memoranda. This meant the season was no longer eligible for the additional 5 percent tax rebate (reportedly around NZ$33 million or US$23 million). Multiple factors led to the change, including Tolkien's estate wanting the series to be filmed in the UK. The New Zealand government listed the season's final qualifying expenditure as NZ$532.5 million (US$327.5 million), giving a final tax rebate of NZ$106.5 million (US$65.5 million) and a net cost in the country of NZ$426 million (US$262 million).

=== Casting ===
Casting was underway by July 2019, including in the United States, the United Kingdom, and Australia. Casting for extras also began in New Zealand at that time. The showrunners were not interested in hiring famous actors and wanted to find the best person for each role, which McKay said was like finding a needle in a haystack. By the end of July, Markella Kavenagh was in talks to portray a lead character who was referred to as "Tyra". Will Poulter was cast in another lead role, referred to as "Beldor", in September. His character was said to be one of the most sought after roles for young actors in Hollywood at the time. Maxim Baldry was informally attached in a significant role in mid-October, and Joseph Mawle was cast later that month. Mawle was reportedly playing the lead villain, referred to as "Oren". In December, Ema Horvath was cast in another lead role; Poulter was forced to leave the series due to scheduling conflicts; and Morfydd Clark was cast as Galadriel, who was portrayed by Cate Blanchett in Jackson's films.

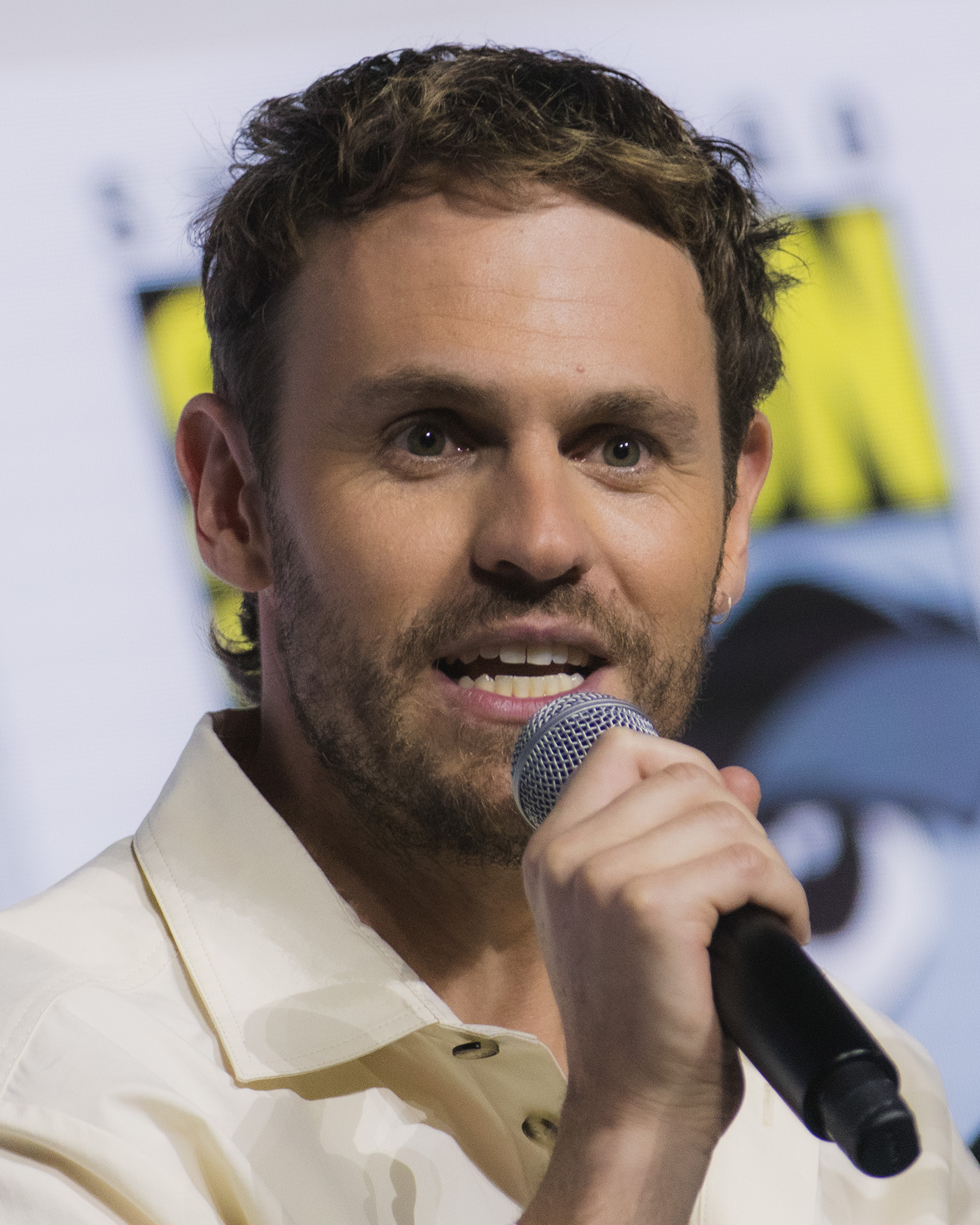
Charlie Vickers portrays Halbrand, who is revealed in the season finale to be the Dark Lord Sauron. This came after theories and speculation about who was playing Sauron in the series.

Robert Aramayo was cast in a lead role, replacing Poulter, in early January 2020. He was later revealed to be playing Elrond, who was portrayed by Hugo Weaving in the films. A week after Aramayo's casting, Amazon officially announced his casting along with that of Owain Arthur, Nazanin Boniadi, Tom Budge, Clark, Ismael Cruz Córdova, Horvath, Kavenagh, Mawle, Tyroe Muhafidin, Sophia Nomvete, Megan Richards, Dylan Smith, Charlie Vickers, and Daniel Weyman. The showrunners said there had been an "extensive global search" to cast these actors, who had begun table reads in New Zealand by that time. Amazon's co-head of television Vernon Sanders said there were still key roles to be filled, and one of these was confirmed to go to Baldry in March when his deal was completed. In December 2020, Amazon announced 20 new cast members for the series: Cynthia Addai-Robinson, Baldry, Ian Blackburn, Kip Chapman, Anthony Crum, Maxine Cunliffe, Trystan Gravelle, Lenny Henry, Thusitha Jayasundera, Fabian McCallum, Simon Merrells, Geoff Morrell, Peter Mullan, Lloyd Owen, Augustus Prew, Peter Tait, Alex Tarrant, Leon Wadham, Benjamin Walker, and Sara Zwangobani. Baldry, Owen, and Walker were respectively cast as Isildur, Elendil, and Gil-galad. Those characters are all from Tolkien's works and appeared in Jackson's films during flashbacks, where they were respectively portrayed by Harry Sinclair, Peter McKenzie, and Mark Ferguson.

In March 2021, Budge said he left the series after filming several episodes and explained that Amazon decided to recast his role, reported to be the Tolkien character Celebrimbor, after reviewing the first episodes. Due to the COVID-19 pandemic, further casting was restricted to actors in New Zealand at the time. Charles Edwards, who was starring in the New Zealand-based series Under the Vines (2021–2024), auditioned for Celebrimbor and Weber said it was a moment of luck for the producers. His casting was announced in July along with that of Will Fletcher, Amelie Child-Villiers, and Beau Cassidy. Logistical issues following Celebrimbor's recasting led to a subplot between him and the Dwarves being removed.

Seven of the main actors were New Zealanders and a third of the season's 124 speaking roles went to New Zealand actors. The rest of the cast came from Australia, Sri Lanka, the UK, and the US. The cast did not know which characters they were portraying until they arrived in New Zealand, and alternate scripts were written to hide the big character reveals. This secrecy led to theories and speculation about who could be portraying Sauron. Some fans identified a character in a trailer that they thought could be actor Anson Boon as Sauron's Annatar disguise. Weber said this was actually Bridie Sisson as a different character. The finale reveals that Vickers's Halbrand is Sauron in disguise. He learned this during the production break after filming the first two episodes, but suspected the character's villainous nature during auditions when he was asked to recite a monologue given by Satan in John Milton's poem Paradise Lost (1667). There was also speculation about the identity of the Stranger; the finale reveals that he is a Wizard and references dialogue spoken by Gandalf in The Lord of the Rings. Other Tolkien characters adapted for the season include the Dwarven kings Durin IV (Arthur) and Durin III (Mullan); the Númenórean rulers Tar-Míriel (Addai-Robinson), Ar-Pharazôn (Gravelle), and Tar-Palantir (Ken Blackburn); and Galadriel's brother Finrod (Fletcher).

=== Design ===
Heinrichs was attached to the series before Bayona joined. Avery said he was hired because most of what had been done initially "wasn't working", and he had to "start from scratch" and work quickly to be ready for filming. Heinrichs is credited as production designer for the first two episodes alongside Avery. One of the "guideposts" Avery was given when he joined the series was for each Middle-earth culture to be easily identifiable; a "war room" was assembled where the design language for each culture was defined. Dialect coach Leith McPherson, returning from the Hobbit films, established different dialects for each culture. Daniel Reeve, who was responsible for calligraphy and maps on the films, returned to do the same for the series and also to invent new writing systems for some of the cultures. The production had seven stages and multiple backlot spaces across Auckland Film Studios, Kumeu Film Studios, and Kelly Park Film Studios; Kelly Park is a former equestrian center where they could dig into the dirt floor. Wētā Workshop created props, weapons, and prosthetics, which were shipped from Wellington to Auckland by truck. 87 sets, 2,000 costumes, and more than 1,000 weapons and 2,500 arrows were created for the season.

=== Filming ===
==== Initial work ====
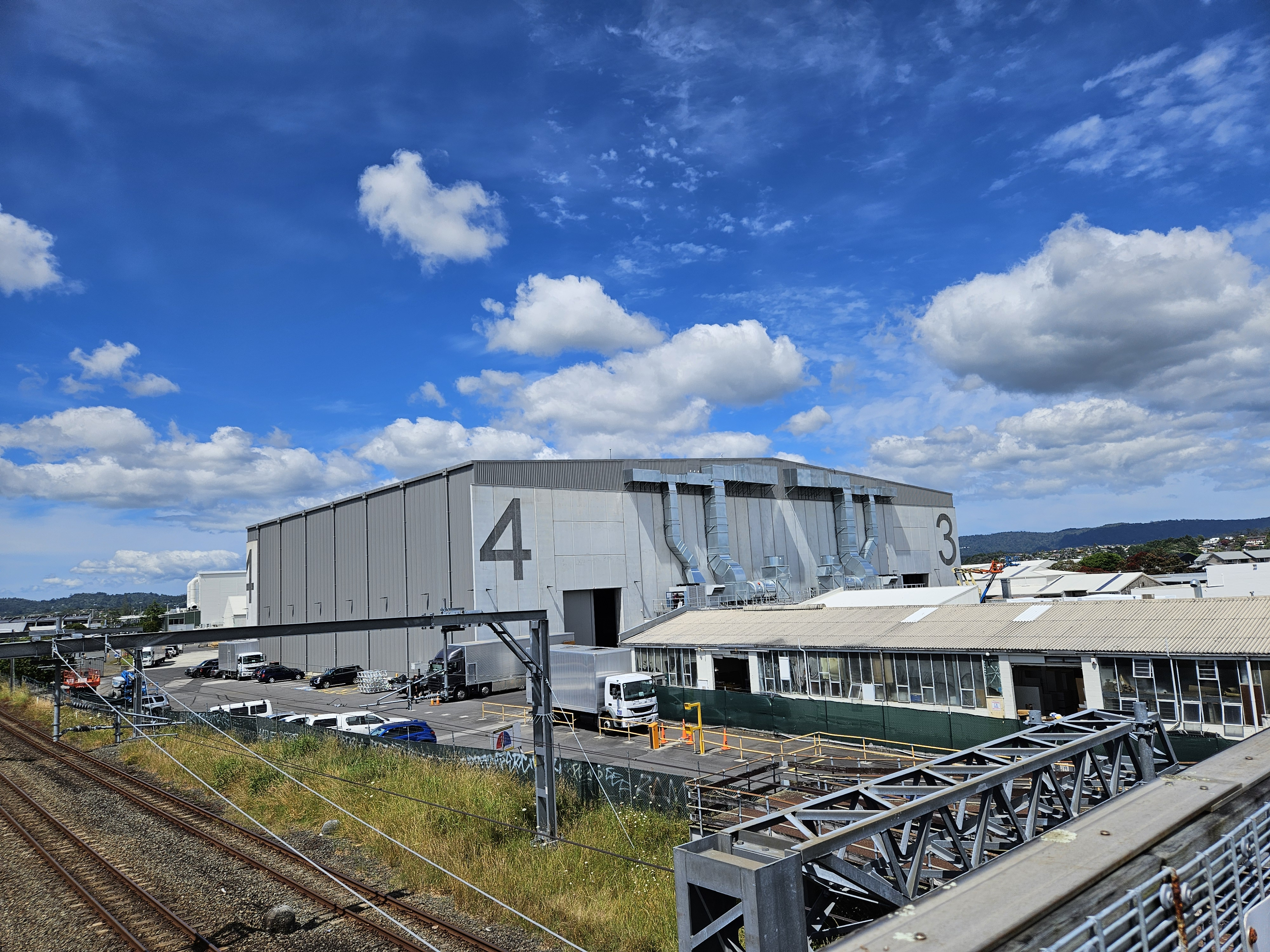
Auckland Film Studios was one of the season's production studios.

The season was produced under the working title Untitled Amazon Project or simply UAP. Filming for the first block of two episodes was scheduled to take place from January to May 2020, followed by the planned production break and then filming on the other episode blocks from October 2020 to June 2021. Óscar Faura returned from Bayona's films as cinematographer for the first two episodes, and chose Arri Alexa Mini LF cameras and a 2.39:1 widescreen aspect ratio. Arri Alexa LF and Phantom Flex4K cameras were used for higher frame rate sequences. Vic Armstrong supervised the series' action sequences and was the lead second unit director, with Glenn Suter as stunt coordinator. Filming for the series was reported to have begun in early February, but Avery said they "didn't really get started" until March.

Wētā FX provided the majority of on-set visual effects support. Real-time camera software was used to make previsualizations of set extensions and other digital elements visible during filming. A key technical challenge was to make the Dwarves and Harfoots look the correct size, as they are supposed to be much smaller than Men and Elves. After determining that this could not be done solely through visual effects, a list of "Ten Commandments" was created for approaching these scenes. Techniques included doubles who were the correct size, oversized props and prosthetics, actors looking over the heads of their scene partners, and forced perspective shots. Two versions of some sets were created at different scales, but these were limited by budgetary restrictions, and the preference was to have actors looking at each other to prioritize their performances. A new system for motion control photography was created so shots could be filmed multiple times at different scales while replicating the movement of hand-held cameras.

==== COVID-19 pandemic ====
Filming was placed on indefinite hold after 25 days due to the COVID-19 pandemic. Bayona was halfway through filming his episodes when filming was shut down. Around 800 cast and crew members were initially told to stay home, and many non-New Zealander cast and crew eventually left the country. Several actors and some artists remained. Filming was allowed to resume in early May under new safety guidelines from the New Zealand government, but the production decided to segue into the planned filming break early rather than complete work on the first two episodes. The crew took advantage of the extended break to refine the designs and scripts, including adjustments to align with the new second-season storylines. The series was one of seven film and television productions that were granted exemptions to allow cast and crew members to re-enter New Zealand while its borders were closed to non-New Zealanders during the pandemic. The exemptions were granted before June 18 and applied to 93 members of the production as well as 20 family members.

Pre-production work restarted within eight or nine weeks of the pandemic beginning. Filming resumed on September 28, and Bayona completed filming his episodes by December 23. Production on further episodes was set to begin in January 2021 following a two-week Christmas break. Because of the filming delays, the planned episode blocks were no longer followed and two first units began filming simultaneously. These were called "Ent" and "Warg", referencing two of Tolkien's creatures. At times there were also multiple second units filming, meaning there were four units working at the same time on some days. Once production was underway again, the design team was not able to bring in extra help from outside New Zealand, forcing them to cut back on some plans for later episodes and re-use sets instead of building new ones.

Yip confirmed that he had begun filming by March 2021, and Brändström was in New Zealand for production in May. Aaron Morton and Alex Disenhof were the respective cinematographers for their episodes. In June, Walker said the production's timeline was "nebulous" and Amazon would "let us go when they're done with us". Many of the international cast members were effectively trapped in New Zealand for nearly two years. Filming wrapped on August 2, after 385 shoot days covering 214 first unit days, 126 second unit days, and 45 splinter unit days. 786 hours of footage was recorded.

==== Production controversies ====
In July 2021, several stunt performers alleged that a senior stunt supervisor had created an "uneasy environment" that contributed to an unsafe workplace. At least three stunt performers were seriously injured on the set, including stuntwoman Dayna Grant who suffered a head injury in March 2021. Stuntwoman Elissa Cadwell was injured when she struck her head falling into a water tank while rehearsing a stunt in February 2020. Responding to the allegations, the production's head of safety Willy Heatley said the injury rate was 0.065 percent across 16,200 stuntperson work days and this was mostly "common stunt-related sprains" and strains.

In November 2022, The Guardian reported on "serious concerns" that crew had regarding the production's environmental impact. A sustainability team was appointed in January 2021, and said the production generated around 14,387 tonnes of carbon dioxide and more than 11,433 cubic metres (403,800 cu ft) of landfill waste by that July. The team promoted several sustainable practices but they felt their role was largely diagnostic. In response to The Guardian's story, an Amazon Studios spokesperson said their sustainability practices "either met or exceeded industry standards" and complied with New Zealand's environmental laws and regulations.

=== Visual effects ===
Part of a large Númenor set (top) that was constructed for the season, depicting the city's wharf and harbor, and the final shot (below) showing visual effects work to extend the set.

When filming ended in August 2021, post-production was expected to continue in New Zealand until June 2022. In addition to Wētā FX, visual effects were created by Industrial Light & Magic (ILM), Rodeo FX, Method Studios, DNEG, Rising Sun Pictures, Cause and FX, Cantina Creative, Atomic Arts, and Outpost VFX. 1,500 visual effects artists worked on the season, which has more than 9,500 visual effects shots. The different vendors were overseen by visual effects supervisor Jason Smith, who noted that big feature films usually have around 2,000 visual effects shots. Ames said the effects were completed to a theatrical resolution so they could be shown on screens ranging from televisions to IMAX.

Wētā handled key sequences, built environments such as Khazad-dûm, and created various creatures: the Balrog, Fell beasts, Great Eagles, a Warg, and a Snow-troll. Digital environments were based on real locations, though some locations were combined as was the case for Númenor. ILM was responsible for the ocean, which is a recurring effect for the season. The company also created the sea monster known as "The Worm", and the wolves that are seen in the season. Wētā, ILM, and Rising Sun all worked on the eruption of Mount Doom at the end of the sixth episode, while DNEG was responsible for the battle sequences earlier in that episode. Rodeo handled much of the Harfoot storyline, including environment augmentation, scale work, and fire and magic effects. Cause and FX were hired to do temporary work on more than 700 shots during editing. When final visual effects work began, the company contributed to set extensions, scale shots, augmenting props and prosthetics, and were responsible for the final scene in which Sauron enters Mordor. Atomic Arts worked on 317 shots, primarily doing cosmetic adjustments. Outpost was responsible for the forging of the rings in the final episode.

Cantina Creative, who Smith previously worked with for on-screen titles and digital displays, were hired to create the transitions between locations. These use a map of Tolkien's world, which was drawn by Reeve. Cantina translated his art into a digital model that was designed to look like aged leather. The company went to Wayne Christensen's leathercraft shop in San Fernando Valley to take macro photography of real leather for reference. Cantina artists used hand-controlled tools to add displacement, weathering, bumps, and scratches to the map to make it feel handmade. The camera moves for each transition were filmed for real on a life-size representation of the map using a motion control system that translated the camera movements onto the digital map.

=== Music ===
Composer Bear McCreary wrote fifteen themes or leitmotifs for the season, including an "anthem" for each culture and then individual character themes that relate to their culture's music. McCreary composed nine hours of music, which was recorded with 90-piece orchestras at Abbey Road Studios and AIR Studios in London, choirs at Synchron Stage in Vienna, and soloists on specialty instruments around the world.

The Lord of the Rings: The Rings of Power (Season One: Amazon Original Series Soundtrack)

Film score by Bear McCreary
- Released: August 19, 2022
- Recorded: November 2021 – April 2022
- Studios: Abbey Road; AIR; Synchron Stage Vienna; Miscellaneous
- Genres: Orchestra; choir; world
- Length: 160:54
- Languages: English; Constructed languages
- Labels: Amazon; Mondo

Bear McCreary chronology
Paws of Fury: The Legend of Hank (2022)	The Lord of the Rings: The Rings of Power (Season One) (2022)	A Shadow of the Past (2022)

Singles from The Lord of the Rings: The Rings of Power (Season One)
- 1. "Galadriel" Released: July 21, 2022; 2. "Sauron" Released: July 21, 2022

Two singles by McCreary, "Galadriel" and "Sauron", were released on Amazon Music on July 21, 2022. They were followed by a soundtrack album featuring Shore's main title theme and selections from McCreary's score for the season. The album was released on all major streaming services on August 19 and was physically released by Mondo for CD on October 14 and vinyl on January 13, 2023. The Amazon Music version includes two exclusive tracks. "Where the Shadows Lie" featuring Fiona Apple, a song heard during the end credits of the season finale, was added to the season album after that episode's debut. Additional albums featuring the full score for each episode were also released, as was a box set collecting the season album and all eight episode albums. All music for the season album was composed by Bear McCreary, except where noted:

Track listing
No.	Title	Length
1.	"The Lord of the Rings: The Rings of Power Main Title" (composed by Howard Shore)	1:34
2.	"Where the Shadows Lie" (featuring Fiona Apple)	3:49
3.	"Galadriel"	3:44
4.	"Khazad-dûm"	3:21
5.	"Nori Brandyfoot"	2:50
6.	"The Stranger"	5:04
7.	"Númenor"	4:32
8.	"Sauron"	2:46
9.	"Valinor"	2:40
10.	"In the Beginning"	7:50
11.	"Elrond Half-elven"	3:24
12.	"Durin IV"	3:05
13.	"Harfoot Life"	2:22
14.	"Bronwyn and Arondir"	2:48
15.	"Halbrand"	2:56
16.	"The Boat"	4:09
17.	"Sundering Seas"	2:42
18.	"Nobody Goes Off Trail"	4:26
19.	"Elendil and Isildur"	4:17
20.	"White Leaves"	4:43
21.	"The Secrets of the Mountain"	3:50
22.	"Nolwa Mahtar"	2:03
23.	"Nampat"	2:35
24.	"A Plea to the Rocks" (featuring Sophia Nomvete)	3:48
25.	"This Wandering Day" (featuring Megan Richards)	2:11
26.	"Scherzo for Violin and Swords"	1:53
27.	"Sailing into the Dawn"	4:19
28.	"Find the Light" (Amazon Music exclusive)	3:27
29.	"For the Southlands"	4:33
30.	"Cavalry"	4:07
31.	"The Promised King" (Amazon Music exclusive)	4:06
32.	"Water and Flame"	3:30
33.	"In the Mines"	8:15
34.	"The Veil of Smoke"	5:00
35.	"The Mystics"	7:55
36.	"Perilous Whisperings"	2:42
37.	"The Broken Line"	5:56
38.	"Wise One"	8:45
39.	"True Creation Requires Sacrifice"	5:52
40.	"Where the Shadows Lie – Instrumental"	3:05
Total length:		160:54

== Marketing ==
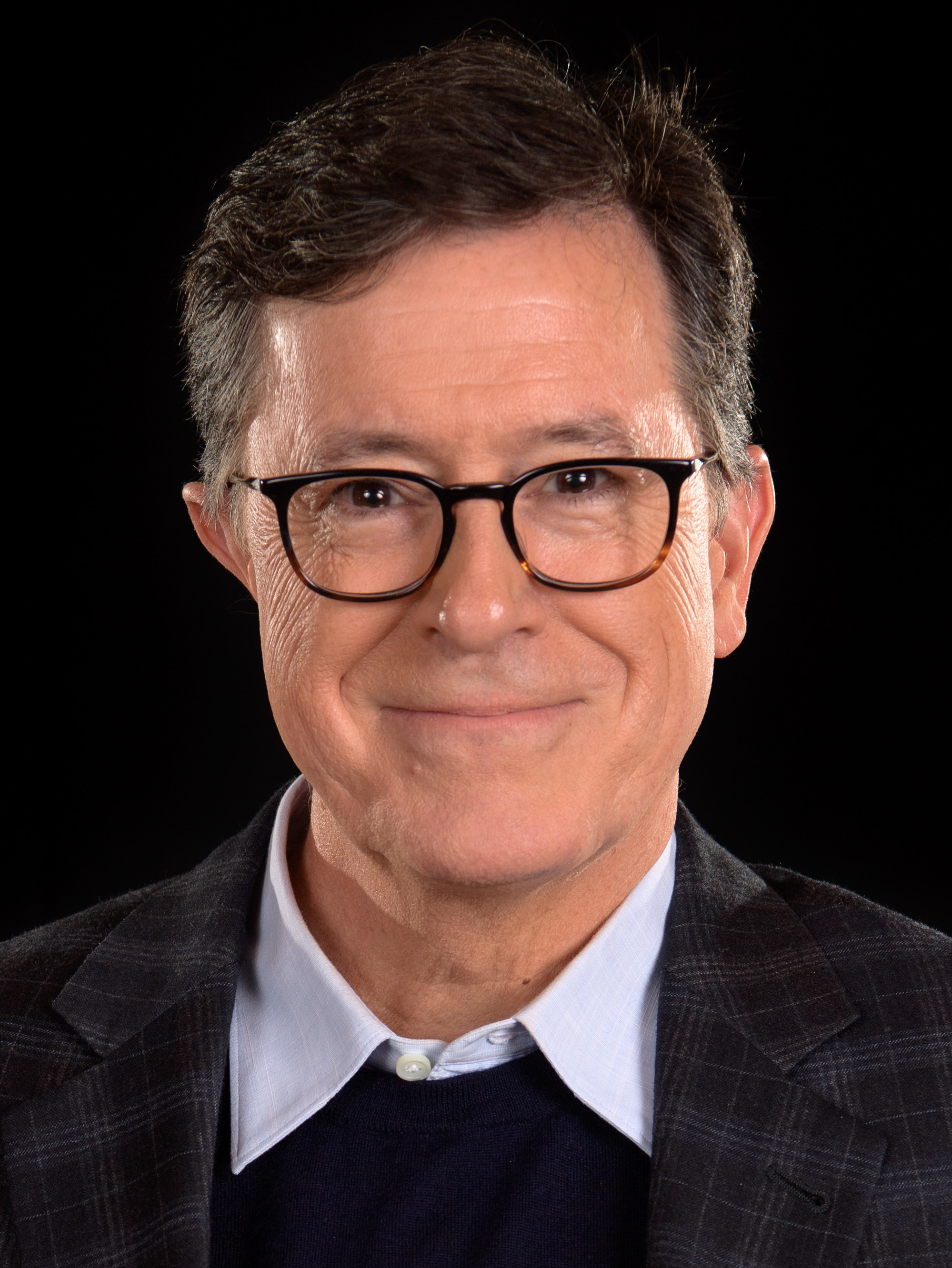
Television host and avid Tolkien fan Stephen Colbert moderated the series' panel at San Diego Comic-Con.

Marketing began in January 2022 with a title announcement video. 23 character posters were released on February 3 which just feature characters' hands and torsos, which Amazon said was done to "fuel fan speculation and discussion". A first look at some of the main characters and early story details were revealed on February 10, and the first teaser trailer was released on February 13 during Super Bowl LVI. Tolkien fan website TheOneRing.net hosted an official watch party, and high-profile fans promoted the teaser at Bellver Castle in the Balearic Islands, Spain. Commentators said it did not reveal many details but highlighted its "epic" scope and spectacle. Amelia Emberwing at IGN said the most successful aspect was that the teaser "feels like The Lord of the Rings". In contrast, Jack Butler of National Review felt the first look images were "Tolkienesque" but was less sure about the teaser, which made him think the series would be overly reliant on visual effects. Kevin E G Perry of The Independent was even more critical, comparing the visuals to a "cut scene from an old Final Fantasy computer game". Analysis company RelishMix reported that the teaser had 80.34 million views in 24 hours across Facebook, Twitter, YouTube, and Instagram, the third highest among trailers aired during Super Bowl LVI. Amazon, quoting researcher WaveMetrix, claimed a Super Bowl record of 257 million views in 24 hours across those platforms and TikTok.

The early marketing led to a "cacophony" of online fan discourse, including concerns about accuracy to Tolkien. The Escapist's Darren Mooney said "extreme reactions" online were to be expected and likely did not represent general opinions. In response to the fan concerns, Amazon flew several Tolkien critics, fan websites, and influencers to a screening in May 2022 at Merton College, Oxford, where Tolkien had been a professor. They were shown 20 minutes of completed footage, and talked to the showrunners and Howe. Justin Sewell of TheOneRing.net said the footage "looks like it should, sounds like it should, and feels like a return" to Middle-earth. Kaitlyn Facista, writing for the Tea with Tolkien blog, said the footage immersed her in Middle-earth better than the teaser, and she was impressed by the showrunners' knowledge of the source material. Others reported that the event made them "cautiously optimistic". Corey Olsen, an academic and podcaster known as the "Tolkien Professor", felt the series was in "very good hands" after meeting the showrunners.

A second teaser was released on July 14, 2022. Blake Hawkins at Comic Book Resources felt its inclusion of more Tolkien lore would help assuage the concerns of fans, but TechRadar's Matt Evans disagreed. He said many fans accepted the changes Jackson made to adapt The Lord of the Rings, but the same could not be said for his The Hobbit films and Evans felt The Rings of Power would be treated like them. Other commentators again noted the visuals and feeling of returning to Middle-earth, including Adam B. Vary and Wilson Chapman at Variety. However, they felt it did not explain the story enough for audience members unfamiliar with Tolkien. Scott Mendelson, writing for Forbes, said the teaser was not connected enough to the Lord of the Rings films to entice general audiences.

Later in July 2022, the series was promoted at San Diego Comic-Con with a "meticulously choreographed" presence that included a meet-and-greet between cast members and Tolkien fans; a private dinner with media; branding on San Diego trains and the convention's entrances; and a two-hour panel moderated by television host and avid Tolkien fan Stephen Colbert, who was flown in for the day as a surprise for attendees. The panel began with McCreary conducting a 25-piece orchestra and 16-person choir, performing a suite of his original score. A full trailer and five clips were shown, and Colbert interviewed the cast and crew. Marketing executive Susan Kroll said the convention was their "first real opportunity to show fans our dedication" to the source material. Several outlets included the series on lists of "winners" at the convention, and Adam Bankhurst at IGN said the panel "changed the conversation" and created positive buzz in a way that the teasers did not. The panel's trailer was also released online, and Vary said it explains the series' premise, unlike the teasers. He and several other commentators highlighted the appearance of a Balrog. James Whitbrook at Gizmodo said there was a lot going on in the trailer and the series was "looking quite fantastic".

== Release ==
The first two episodes were screened at premiere events in August 2022, in Los Angeles, Mexico City, Mumbai, New York City, and London. They were also shown in free fan screenings on August 31 in around 200 countries, including the US, Canada, the UK, Ireland, Argentina, Colombia, Australia, and New Zealand. The episodes premiered on Prime Video in the US on September 1. The other six episodes were released weekly from September 9 to October 14. Episodes were released on the streaming service around the world at the same time as the US release, in more than 240 countries and territories.

For two weeks leading up to the premiere of the second season on August 29, 2024, all episodes of the first season were made available for free on the streaming service Samsung TV Plus in the US, Canada, Brazil, the UK, and Germany. Ahead of the third season's release in November 2026, a home media release for the first two seasons was announced. Each release features the eight episodes of the respective season along with behind-the-scenes content. They were released on 4K Ultra HD, Blu-ray, and DVD on November 3, and in limited edition 4K UHD SteelBook—with Amazon exclusive collectable art cards—on December 1.

== Reception ==
=== Viewership ===
Amazon announced that The Rings of Power had been watched by 25 million viewers globally in the 24 hours after the first two episodes were released, marking Prime Video's biggest premiere ever. This was the first time Amazon publicly stated viewership data for the service. At the end of September 2022, Salke said the season had been watched by nearly 100 million customers. In December, Sanders said the season was Prime Video's most-watched series ever. He said there was a surge of new viewers after all of its episodes were released, and there had also been spikes in the sales of Tolkien's books. He called the season "a tremendous success... as significant as our investment has been, it has more than paid off". It remained in Prime Video's top 10 most-watched content until late January 2023. In April, The Hollywood Reporter's Kim Masters reported that the season was only finished by 37 percent of its initial US viewers and 45 percent of its international viewers. Industry insiders said a 50 percent completion rate would have been a "solid but not spectacular result".

Whip Media, tracking viewership data for the users of its TV Time app, said The Rings of Power had the fifth-highest first three days in its history. The series was in the top five of Whip's streaming chart each week of its release. JustWatch, a guide to streaming content, included The Rings of Power on its list of top 10 US streaming series for the weeks ending September 11, September 18, and October 16, and said the series was the second-most watched of September and the fifth-most watched of 2022. Parrot Analytics determines audience "demand expressions" based on social media activity, and listed The Rings of Power in its top ten until the week ending October 28. Parrot said the series was second in the list and 43.4 times more in demand than the average series with the release of its season finale. Nielsen Media Research, which records streaming viewership on US television screens, estimated that The Rings of Power was watched for 1.25 billion minutes during its first four days. This is around 12.6 million viewers, the most for any streaming series or film that week. The Rings of Power was the first Prime Video original series to top the list. It remained in the top four until the release of its finale in the week ending October 16, when the series was in second place with 1.1 billion minutes viewed. Nielsen said it was the 15th-most watched series of 2022 with 9.4 billion minutes viewed, the second best for a Prime Video series after The Boys (10.6 billion minutes over three seasons).

In September 2024, Salke said "tens of millions" of viewers had watched the season from early August ahead of the second season's premiere that month. The first season was still the most-watched season on Prime Video globally, despite being surpassed in US viewership by the first season of Fallout earlier in 2024. The season had been watched by more than 150 million viewers globally.

=== Critical response ===
The Lord of the Rings: The Rings of Power season 1: Critical reception by episode
Percentage of positive critics' reviews tracked by the website Rotten Tomatoes

The first two episodes received generally positive reviews from critics, with particular praise for the visuals and high production value. Some reviewers were skeptical whether the storytelling and slow pacing justified the large budget. On review aggregator Rotten Tomatoes, 84% of 487 critics gave the season a positive review and the average of rated reviews was 8 out of 10. The critics consensus reads, "It may not yet be the One Show to Rule Them All, but The Rings of Power enchants with its opulent presentation and deeply-felt rendering of Middle-earth." Metacritic assigned a weighted average score of 71 out of 100 based on 40 reviews, indicating a "generally favorable" response.

Discussing the full season, reviewers continued to praise the visuals and production design, but were more critical of the structure and pacing. The Escapist's Darren Mooney said the focus on character mysteries led to early episodes being drawn out and the finale being rushed. Others agreed the finale was rushed, and the season over-relied on mystery box-style storytelling at the expense of character development. The Númenor storyline was highlighted for its pacing issues, with Alan Sepinwall at Rolling Stone calling it a "tedious detour" and Samantha Nelson at IGN saying it made the fourth and fifth episodes "sluggish". In contrast, the friendship developed between Elrond and Durin IV received praise from multiple reviewers, as did Morfydd Clark's performance as Galadriel. Ed Power, writing for The Irish Times and The Telegraph, was critical of the Harfoots' affected "stage-Irish accents" and deemed them to be offensive stereotypes of Irish people. Other Irish critics and publications agreed, but some were less critical of this. The cruel nature of the Harfoot society was also questioned by critics.

Several reviewers saw the season as a starting point to improve on in future seasons, but James Whitbrook at Gizmodo said the series should have told its most interesting stories from the beginning. There were also mixed thoughts on its relationship to Tolkien's writings and Jackson's films. Sepinwall felt the series had struggled to balance the needs of Tolkien fans and more casual viewers, with the latter having a long wait until the key action sequences in the sixth episode. Ben Sledge at The Gamer was critical of the number of references made to Jackson's films and felt they undermined the series' own identity. Several critics found the season to be true to the themes and tone of Tolkien's works, but changes from his established lore were still criticized. Jeff LaSala at Reactor believed the showrunners knew the lore but felt they did not truly understand Tolkien and were stretching the source material rather than pulling directly from it. Responding to criticisms that the series is only "vaguely connected" to Tolkien and was just made to capitalize on the brand, the showrunners said it was "deeply, deeply connected" and they would not have "given four years of our lives, 24/7" if they did not think it was a story worth telling.

=== Audience response ===
After the series premiered, Amazon held reviews on Prime Video for 72 hours to ensure they were not coming from Internet trolls or bots, a policy that the company introduced earlier in 2022 for all its series. The Rings of Power's audience rating on Rotten Tomatoes was considerably lower than the critics rating, which was partially attributed to review bombing. James Hibberd at The Hollywood Reporter said some users were posting "numerous negative reviews for [the series] due to its perceived cultural or political issues rather than its actual quality", but he found the majority of negative reviews to be focused on reasons such as story, acting, and pacing. Hibberd felt the audience rating would increase if the series could "win people over" with its quality. The majority of reviews on IMDb and Google were the highest or lowest possible score.

Analysis company Brandwatch found 60 percent of online discussions in the days following the premiere to be negative. These mostly focused on the pacing, writing, acting, visual effects, and differences from Tolkien's writings. The other 40 percent praised the series for its plotlines, characters, cinematography, and respect for Tolkien. Discussing this for TechRadar, Tom Power said many of the negative responses were from Tolkien fans who likely did not want the series to be made at all. He attributed the positive responses to "TV aficionados". He felt the negative group could be won over by future episodes. Cindy White at The A.V. Club described some of the fan discourse as "a fight between loyal [Tolkien] fans who simply want to preserve the integrity of the thing they love and a multinational corporation looking to cash in on that devotion". Anthony Palomba, professor of business administration at the University of Virginia, also partially attributed the responses to "super diehard people" who did not necessarily reflect the views of general audiences. Shaun Gunner, the chair of the Tolkien Society, said responses away from social media were more nuanced. He said some members of the society loved the series, others were unsure, but "very few people are just writing it off".

After the season ended, cast members said conversations about the series had shifted towards more positive feedback. Jon Ben-Asher of TheOneRing.net felt Amazon had built trust with the Tolkien fan base and said his "little corner" of the community was loving the series; the website released a roundup of their staff members' opinions which were mostly positive, despite concerns with changes from Tolkien's works. Sanders said Amazon did a study with thousands of audience members, including fans of Tolkien's writings and Jackson's films, to understand their thoughts on each episode. He acknowledged that there were Tolkien fans who had major issues with the series, but he felt that was to be expected with such a beloved property and was confident in Amazon's approach due to the company having the endorsement of Tolkien's estate.

=== Casting backlash ===
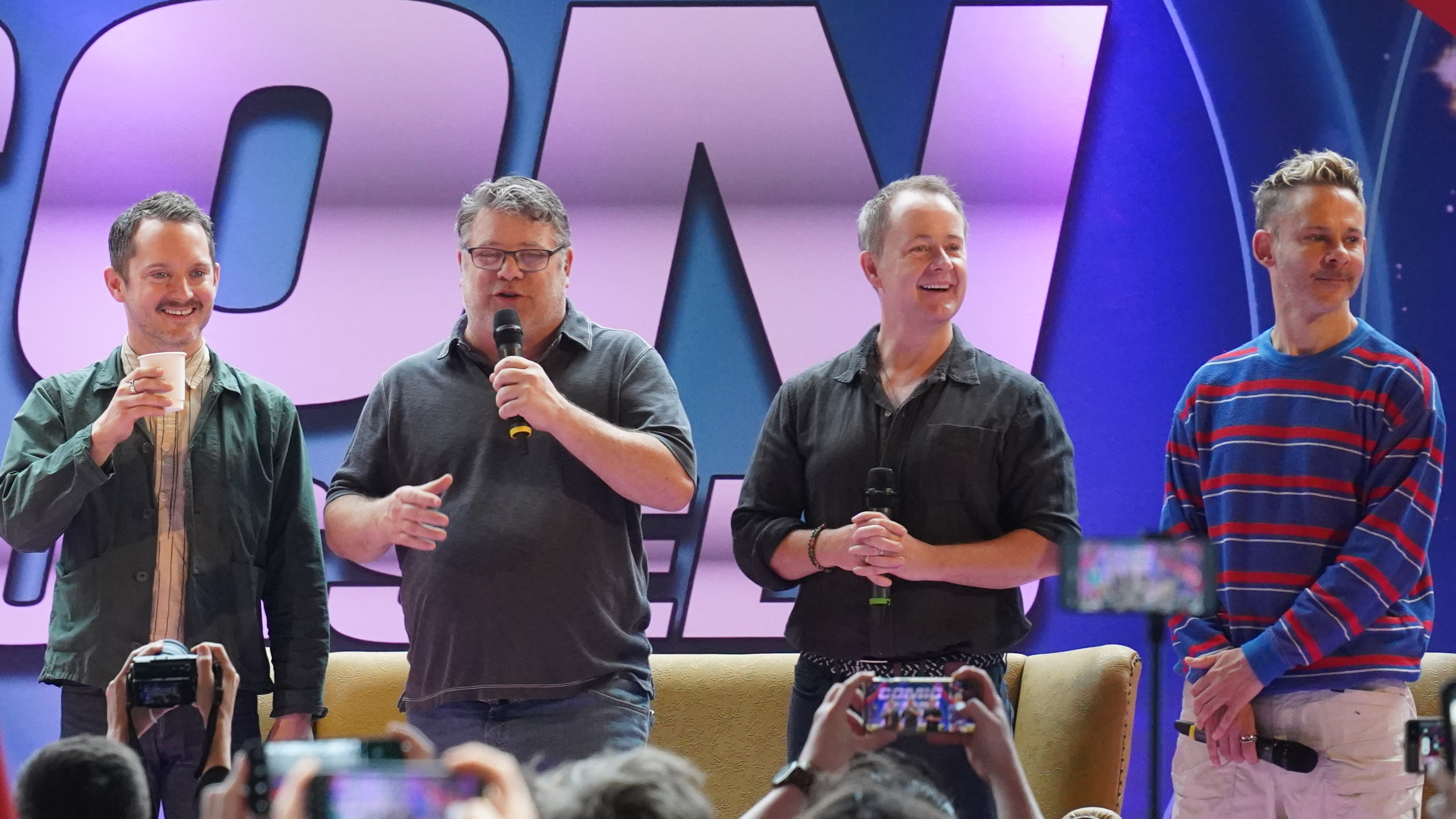
The Lord of the Rings film stars Elijah Wood, Sean Astin, Billy Boyd, and Dominic Monaghan supported the series' cast, whose diversity was the subject of online backlash.

Lenny Henry revealed in October 2021 that he and other people of color had been cast as Harfoots. Non-white actors were also cast as Elves and Dwarves for the first time in the franchise. Amazon received backlash from social media users for these casting decisions, including arguments that they were disrespectful to Tolkien because he never described Elves, Dwarves, and Hobbits as non-white. Tolkien described the Harfoots as being "browner of skin", and generally gave minimal physical descriptions which did not preclude non-white characters existing in his fictional world. The producers said they expected to receive some responses like this, but they wanted to ensure the series reflected "what the world actually looks like" and felt this was true to the spirit of the books. Weber stated, "Tolkien is for everyone. His stories are about his fictional races doing their best work when they leave the isolation of their own cultures and come together." Because of the backlash, Amazon hired an on-set therapist to help the cast and crew.

Several commentators said responses like this had become common for media projects starring women and people of color, including complaints of being "woke", and TheGamer's Ben Sledge compared the backlash to homophobic complaints about Ian McKellen's casting as Gandalf in the Lord of the Rings films. Various social media users expressed their dislike for the series with the following quote, which they incorrectly attributed to Tolkien: "Evil is not able to create anything new, it can only distort and destroy what has been invented or made by the forces of good." Andrew Blair at Den of Geek felt this was "colossally lacking in self-awareness". Some Tolkien fans were reluctant to critique the series in case they became associated with the backlash. Dimitra Fimi, a lecturer in fantasy and children's literature and specialist on Tolkien at the University of Glasgow, wrote a piece with Mariana Rios Maldonado for The Conversation that argues against various statements made in opposition to the diverse casting. James Poniewozik at The New York Times similarly dismissed claims that Tolkien's themes were being replaced by modern social justice ideas, especially because the series does not explore "contemporary or historical racial issues" such as the impact of Jim Crow laws.

Commentators continued to discuss the backlash after the series premiered, with many calling it racist. In September 2022, Puerto Rican star Ismael Cruz Córdova said he had been receiving hateful messages nearly every day for two years due to his casting. The Lord of the Rings film actors Elijah Wood, Billy Boyd, and Dominic Monaghan released a photo of themselves wearing shirts that feature human, Hobbit, and Elf ears in different skin tones along with the phrase "You are all welcome here" in Elvish. Their fellow cast member Sean Astin released his own photo wearing a hat with the same design. Clothing featuring the design was made available for purchase, with half of all proceeds going to a charity that supports people of color. The Rings of Power cast also released a statement using the hashtag #YouAreAllWelcomeHere which denounced the racism that several of their members had faced. Orlando Bloom, who portrayed the Elf Legolas in Jackson's films, posted a photo of himself with Córdova which he captioned "mellon", which means "friend" in Elvish.

=== Comparisons with House of the Dragon ===
Before their release, The Rings of Power and concurrent fantasy series House of the Dragon were widely compared and pitted against each other in what was described as "the biggest battle in fantasy TV history". Comparisons of the two series' online followings in August 2022 found that House of the Dragon had significantly more interest. When a final trailer for The Rings of Power was released after House of the Dragon's premiere, multiple commentators suggested this was specifically timed to remind audiences that The Rings of Power was also premiering.

Like The Rings of Power, House of the Dragon received negative criticisms from fans of its source material regarding the casting of people of color. In terms of audience viewership, Jennifer Maas at Variety said a fair comparison between the two series was not possible based on self-reported data. Comparisons using third-party estimations were complicated by House of the Dragon being broadcast on HBO at the same time as it was streaming on HBO Max, with Whip Media excluding it from its streaming lists because of this, and Nielsen only including HBO Max viewership for the series on its list. Steven Tweedie and Travis Clark of Business Insider felt The Rings of Power had been overshadowed by House of the Dragon, which was supported by social media data. They suggested that The Rings of Power's older audience did not "drive online engagement" in the same way as House of the Dragon's younger viewers. According to TorrentFreak, House of the Dragon was the most pirated series of 2022 and The Rings of Power was the second-most.

The executive producers of The Rings of Power said they did not feel any competition with House of the Dragon and Weber said this had been "manufactured by the media for headlines". The showrunners said they were making the series for years before HBO scheduled House of the Dragon to debut just weeks earlier than The Rings of Power, which then began to dominate "the narrative about how it's received. But it was not at all part of the narrative in how our show was conceived." Amazon reportedly used House of the Dragon for comparisons and were concerned by its high viewership. Comparing the two series' performances for Vanity Fair, Natalie Jarvey felt there were "no losers here. Neither project flopped on arrival and both have weathered early criticism... Hollywood should be cheering on both shows".

=== Accolades ===
Córdova was named an honorable mention for TVLine's "Performer of the Week" for his performance in "Adar". Clark was included on lists of standout television performances for 2022 by Vulture and Variety, the latter as a pair with Charlie Vickers. The Rings of Power was named on multiple lists of best television series for 2022, including by Comic Book Resources (2nd), BuddyTV (8th), JoBlo.com (9th), Boston.com (10th), Inverse (10th), The Mary Sue (10th), Time Out (12th), Radio Times (15th), MovieWeb (16th), Empire (17th), and NME (17th), as well as by CBC News, Collider, Gizmodo, Nerdist, and Wired on unranked lists. Additionally, "Udûn" was listed as one of the best television episodes of the year by Entertainment Weekly and Mashable. The season was one of 94 television series from the top 200 scripted series on industry database IMDbPro that received the ReFrame Stamp for the 2022 to 2023 television season. The stamp is awarded to productions that have gender-balanced hiring.

Accolades received by the first season of The Lord of the Rings: The Rings of Power
Award	Date of ceremony	Category	Recipient(s)	Result	Ref.
Art Directors Guild Awards	February 18, 2023	Excellence in Production Design for a One-Hour Period or Fantasy Single-Camera Series	Ramsey Avery (for "Adar")	Won	
Art Directors Guild Awards	February 18, 2023	Excellence in Production Design for a Commercial	Brian Branstetter (for "Title Announcement")	Won	
ASCAP Composers' Choice Awards	May 16, 2023	Television score of the year	Bear McCreary	Nominated	
Astra Creative Arts TV Awards	January 8, 2024	Best Fantasy or Science Fiction Costumes	The Lord of the Rings: The Rings of Power	Nominated	
Astra TV Awards	January 8, 2024	Best Supporting Actor in a Streaming Drama Series	Ismael Cruz Córdova	Nominated	
Australian Production Design Guild Awards	August 26, 2023	Concept Art Award	Matt Hatton	Won	
BAFTA Cymru Awards	October 15, 2023	Best Actor	Owain Arthur	Nominated	
Camerimage	November 19, 2022	Best Episode	J. A. Bayona and Óscar Faura (for "A Shadow of the Past")	Nominated	
Canneseries	April 19, 2023	Madame Figaro Rising Star Award	Morfydd Clark	Won	
Costume Designers Guild Awards	February 27, 2023	Excellence in Sci-Fi/Fantasy Television	Kate Hawley (for "A Shadow of the Past")	Nominated	
Critics' Choice Super Awards	March 16, 2023	Best Science Fiction/Fantasy Series, Limited Series or Made-For-TV Movie	The Lord of the Rings: The Rings of Power	Nominated	
Critics' Choice Super Awards	March 16, 2023	Best Actress in a Science Fiction/Fantasy Series, Limited Series or Made-For-TV Movie	Morfydd Clark	Nominated	
Critics' Choice Television Awards	January 15, 2023	Best Supporting Actor in a Drama Series	Ismael Cruz Córdova	Nominated	
Dorian Awards	June 26, 2023	Most Visually Striking Show	The Lord of the Rings: The Rings of Power	Nominated	
Golden Reel Awards	February 26, 2023	Outstanding Achievement in Sound Editing – Broadcast Long Form Dialogue / ADR	Robby Stambler, Damian Del Borrello, Stefanie Ng, Ailene Roberts, Ray Beentjes, and Gareth Van Niekirk (for "Udûn")	Nominated	
Golden Reel Awards	February 26, 2023	Outstanding Achievement in Sound Editing – Broadcast Long Form Effects / Foley	Damian Del Borrello, Robby Stambler, Paula Fairfield, James Miller, Chris Terhune, Gareth Van Niekerk, Ryan A. Sullivan, Goeun Everett, Richard Wills, Jonathan Bruce, and Amy Barber (for "Udûn")	Nominated	
Golden Reel Awards	February 26, 2023	Outstanding Achievement in Music Editing – Broadcast Long Form	Jason Smith and Michael Baber (for "Alloyed")	Nominated	
Golden Trailer Awards	June 29, 2023	Best Fantasy Adventure for a TV/Streaming Series (Trailer/Teaser/TV Spot)	Trailer Park Group	Nominated	
Golden Trailer Awards	June 29, 2023	Best Original Score for a TV/Streaming Series (Trailer/Teaser/TV Spot)	Trailer Park Group	Nominated	
Golden Trailer Awards	June 29, 2023	Best BTS/EPK for a TV/Streaming Series (Over 2 minutes)	SunnyBoy Entertainment (for Behind the Scenes of "Alloyed")	Nominated	
Golden Trailer Awards	June 29, 2023	Best Billboard (for Feature Film or TV/Streaming Series)	WORKS ADV (for Statue Billboard)	Nominated	
Hollywood Music in Media Awards	November 16, 2022	Original Score — TV Show/Limited Series	Bear McCreary	Nominated	
Hollywood Professional Association Awards	November 28, 2023	Outstanding Visual Effects – Live Action Episode or Series Season	Ron Ames, Jason Smith, Jesse Kobayashi, Ryan Tudhope, and Sam Scott	Nominated	
International Film Music Critics Association Awards	February 23, 2023	Score of the Year	Bear McCreary and Howard Shore	Won	
International Film Music Critics Association Awards	February 23, 2023	Composer of the Year	Bear McCreary	Won	
International Film Music Critics Association Awards	February 23, 2023	Composition of the Year	Bear McCreary (for "Galadriel")	Nominated	
International Film Music Critics Association Awards	February 23, 2023	Composition of the Year	Bear McCreary (for "Númenor")	Nominated	
International Film Music Critics Association Awards	February 23, 2023	Composition of the Year	Bear McCreary (for "Sailing Into the Dawn")	Nominated	
International Film Music Critics Association Awards	February 23, 2023	Best Original Score for Television	Bear McCreary and Howard Shore	Won	
Movieguide Awards	February 26, 2023	Best Mature Audience Television	"Alloyed"	Won	
Movieguide Awards	February 26, 2023	Epiphany Prize Television	"Alloyed"	Nominated	
Movieguide Awards	February 26, 2023	Faith & Freedom Award Television	"Alloyed"	Nominated	
People's Choice Awards	December 6, 2022	The Sci-Fi/Fantasy Show of 2022	The Lord of the Rings: The Rings of Power	Nominated	
Primetime Creative Arts Emmy Awards	January 7, 2024	Outstanding Fantasy/Sci-Fi Costumes	Kate Hawley, Libby Dempster, Lucy McLay, Jaindra Watson, Pip Lingard, and Jenny Rushton (for "A Shadow of the Past")	Nominated	
Primetime Creative Arts Emmy Awards	January 7, 2024	Outstanding Main Title Design	Katrina Crawford, Mark Bashore, Anthony Vitagliano, and Fernando Domínguez Cózar	Nominated	
Primetime Creative Arts Emmy Awards	January 7, 2024	Outstanding Prosthetic Makeup	Jason Docherty, Dan Perry, Mark Knight, and Simon Rose (for "Adar")	Nominated	
Primetime Creative Arts Emmy Awards	January 7, 2024	Original Main Title Theme Music	Howard Shore	Nominated	
Primetime Creative Arts Emmy Awards	January 7, 2024	Outstanding Sound Editing for a Comedy or Drama Series (One-Hour)	Robert Stambler, Damian Del Borrello, Ailene Roberts, Stefanie Ng, Paula Fairfield, Chris Terhune, James Miller, Michael Baber, Jason Smith, Amy Barber, and Jonathan Bruce (for "Udûn")	Nominated	
Primetime Creative Arts Emmy Awards	January 7, 2024	Outstanding Special Visual Effects in a Season or a Movie	Ron Ames, Jason Smith, Nigel Sumner, Ara Khanikian, Dean Clarke, Ken McGaugh, Tom Proctor, Greg Butler, and Joe Henderson	Nominated	
Saturn Awards	February 4, 2024	Best Fantasy Television Series	The Lord of the Rings: The Rings of Power	Nominated	
Saturn Awards	February 4, 2024	Best New Genre Television Series	The Lord of the Rings: The Rings of Power	Nominated	
Screen Actors Guild Awards	February 26, 2023	Outstanding Performance by a Stunt Ensemble in a Television Series	The Lord of the Rings: The Rings of Power	Nominated	
Set Decorators Society of America Awards	August 2, 2023	Best Achievement in Décor/Design of a One Hour Fantasy or Science Fiction Series	Megan Vertelle and Ramsey Avery	Nominated	
Society of Composers & Lyricists Awards	February 15, 2023	Outstanding Original Score for a Television Production	Bear McCreary	Nominated	
Visual Effects Society Awards	February 15, 2023	Outstanding Visual Effects in a Photoreal Episode	Jason Smith, Ron Ames, Nigel Sumner, Tom Proctor, and Dean Clarke (for "Udûn")	Won	
Visual Effects Society Awards	February 15, 2023	Outstanding Created Environment in an Episode, Commercial, or Real-Time Project	Dan Wheaton, Nico Delbecq, Dan LeTarte, and Julien Gauthier (for Númenor City in "Adar")	Won	
Visual Effects Society Awards	February 15, 2023	Outstanding Created Environment in an Episode, Commercial, or Real-Time Project	James Ogle, Péter Bujdosó, Lon Krung, and Shweta Bhatnagar (for Khazad-dûm in "Adrift")	Nominated	
Visual Effects Society Awards	February 15, 2023	Outstanding Effects Simulations in an Episode, Commercial, or Real-Time Project	Kurt Debens, Hamish Bell, Robert Kelly, and Gabriel Roccisano (for Volcano Destruction in "Udûn")	Won	
Visual Effects Society Awards	February 15, 2023	Outstanding Effects Simulations in an Episode, Commercial, or Real-Time Project	Rick Hankins, Aron Bonar, Branko Grujcic, and Laurent Kermel (for Water and Magma in "Udûn")	Nominated	
Visual Effects Society Awards	February 15, 2023	Outstanding Compositing and Lighting in an Episode	Sornalingam P, Ian Copeland, Nessa Mingfang Zhang, and Yuvaraj S (for Tirharad Cavalry Charge in "Udûn")	Nominated	
Visual Effects Society Awards	February 15, 2023	Outstanding Special (Practical) Effects in a Photoreal or Animated Project	Dean Clarke, Oliver Gee, Eliot Naimie, and Mark Robson (for Middle-earth Storm in "Adrift")	Nominated	
World Soundtrack Awards	October 21, 2023	Television Composer of the Year	Bear McCreary	Nominated	

== Companion media ==
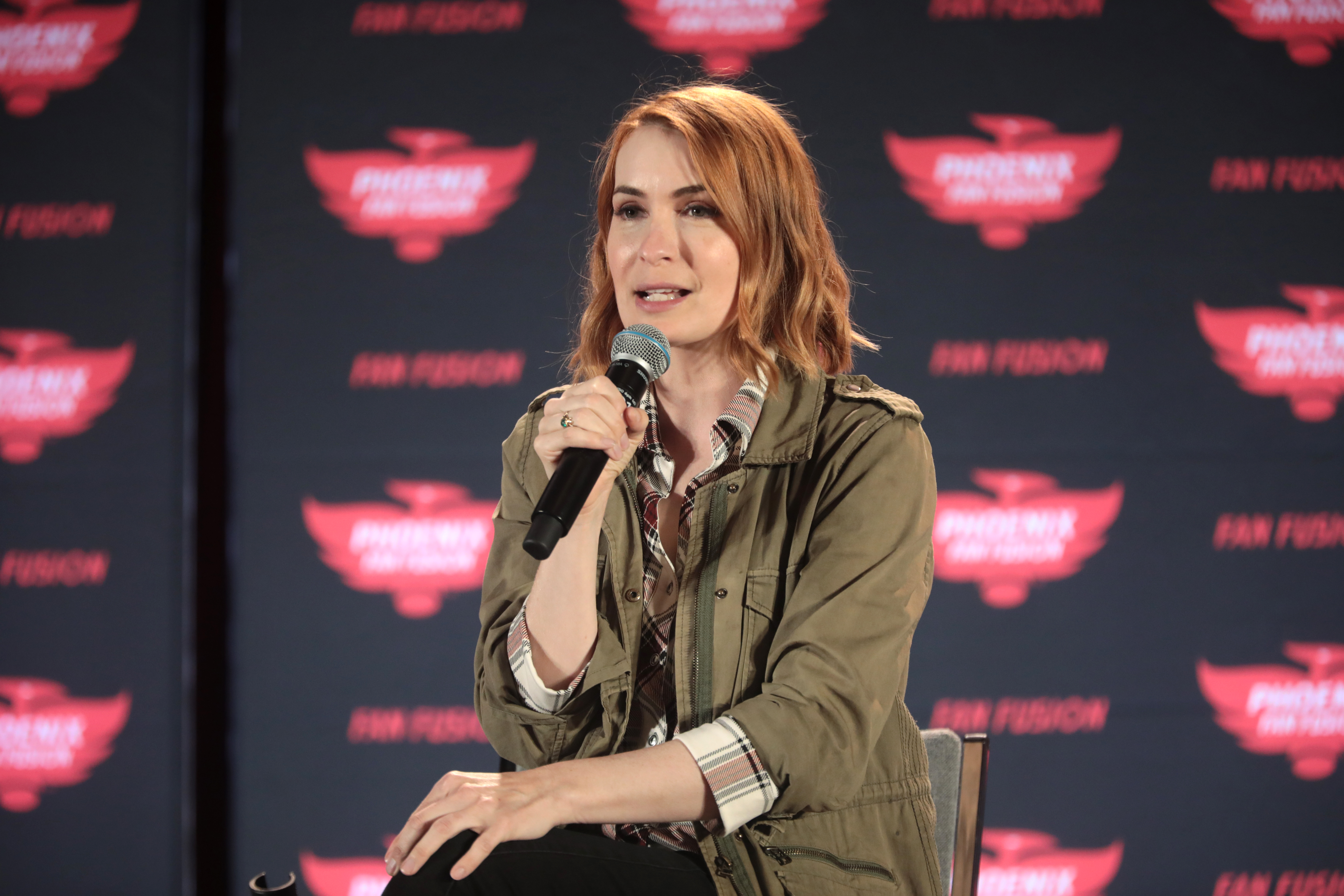
Actress Felicia Day hosted the series' official podcast.

An episode of Deadline's Inside the Ring: LOTR: The Rings of Power, an official aftershow hosted by Deadline Hollywood's Dominic Patten and Anthony D'Alessandro, was released after each episode of The Rings of Power debuted on Prime Video. The aftershow features interviews with cast and crew as well as exclusive "footage and insights" for each episode.

Actress Felicia Day, who described herself as a "super fan of all things Tolkien", hosted The Official The Lord of the Rings: The Rings of Power Podcast. She spent two months recording with the cast and crew while they were promoting the season around the world. The eight-episode podcast was released on Amazon Music on October 14. Day also interviewed cast members for a panel at New York Comic Con, which was recorded and released as a bonus podcast episode on November 9.

On November 21, a series of bonus segments called "The Making of The Rings of Power" were added to Prime Video's X-Ray feature, allowing viewers to learn additional information about the series while watching it. X-Ray executive Craig Muller said the segments were created from thousands of hours of behind-the-scenes footage.
