= JustWatch =

Streaming information website

- Developer: JustWatch GmbH
- Release: February 5, 2015; 11 years ago
- Platform: Amazon Fire TV; Android; Android TV; iOS; Apple TV; Web
- Available in: 36 languages
- List of languages Arabic, Azerbaijani, Belorussian, Bosnian, Bulgarian, Catalan, Chinese, Croatian, Czech, English, Estonian, Finnish, French, German, Greek, Hebrew, Hungarian, Icelandic, Italian, Japanese, Korean, Latvian, Lithuanian, Macedonian, Maltese, Polish, Portuguese, Romanian, Russian, Slovak, Spanish, Swahili, Swedish, Turkish, Ukrainian, Urdu
- Type: Entertainment
- License: Proprietary software, Freemium
- Website: www.justwatch.com

JustWatch is a website that provides information on the availability of films and TV shows on various streaming platforms such as Netflix, HBO Max, Disney+, Hulu, Peacock, Fandango, Apple TV, and Amazon Prime Video, among others. It is also available as a mobile application and smart TV application.

JustWatch provides a search engine that allows users to discover which digital platforms host a particular movie or TV series. As of November 2023, JustWatch is available to users in 139 countries.

== Features ==
JustWatch functions as a search engine by aggregating information about the online availability of films and TV series from video-on-demand streaming services. It aggregates information from more than 100 video content libraries, as well as providing information about video resolution quality, pricing, and purchase or rental options. The website includes various filters for searching, including genre, price, release date, rating, and popularity. Users are also able to create lists of shows and movies and to share these lists with other users.

== History ==
JustWatch GmbH is an international database company that is privately held and headquartered in Berlin, Germany. The company specializes in the online availability of movies and TV series. In addition to its user-facing website, the company also has an advertising-focused arm, JustWatch Media, that works with corporate clients, using data about what people watch that it gleans from user behavior to help entertainment companies tailor their marketing strategies. Its clients include Universal Pictures, Paramount Pictures, and Sony Pictures, among others.

Development of the website began in 2014, and it was launched in the U.S. and Germany in February 2015.

In 2018, the company received funding to improve databases within the European Union.

In December 2019, the company acquired a rival streaming aggregation service, GoWatchIt, from Plexus Entertainment. JustWatch also used the acquisition to open its first New York office.

In 2019, JustWatch had over 30 million users across 38 countries. By 2020, the company's streaming aggregation service was available in over 45 countries. By November 2023, it was available in 139 countries, and had over 40 million monthly users.

On October 20, 2026, JustWatch announced JustWatch TV, its own streaming service.

=== Founding ===
JustWatch was co-founded in 2013 by David Croyé, Christoph Hoyer, Kevin Hiller, Dominik Raute, Ingke Weimert, and Michael Wilken.

In a company blog post from February 2017, Croyé described the group of co-founders as all having previously "worked in leading roles at successful international tech-startups in Berlin." Croyé, who currently holds the title of CEO at JustWatch GmbH, had previously worked as the chief marketing officer at kaufDA, a European location-based mobile coupon and promotion service, and the background of other co-founders included time at the adtech company Trademob and the streaming site MyVideo.

Startup capital for the website initially came from the founders themselves. Croyé in particular was able to reinvest funds he had obtained from the sale of kaufDA to Axel Springer, a European media company, in March 2011. Since 2015, the company has had at least one additional round of seed funding, with investors including venture capital groups CG Partners and STS Ventures.
