= Sara Zwangobani =

Australian actress (born 1989)

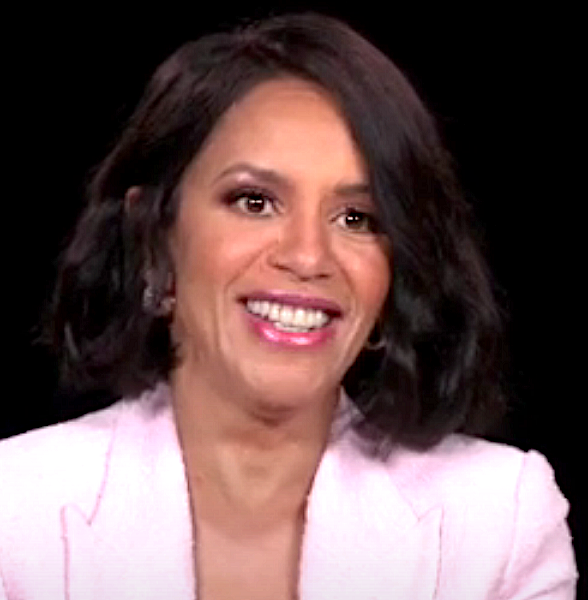
- Zwangobani in 2022
- Born: Sara Zwangobani; Canberra, Australian Capital Territory, Australia
- Occupation: Actress
- Years active: 1997–present

Sara Zwangobani is an Australian actress. She has appeared in Australian TV and film in Love My Way and Monarch Cove (2006), All Saints (2005 & 2009), Nightmares & Dreamscapes: From the Stories of Stephen King (2006), Disgrace (2008), Packed to the Rafters (2009), Soul Mates (2014), Home and Away and Doctor Doctor (2019). Her most notable role is portraying Marigold Brandyfoot in Amazon Prime Video's The Lord of the Rings: The Rings of Power in 2022.

== Early life ==
Zwangobani was born in Canberra, ACT, Australia, and brought up in Cook. She has a Zimbabwean father and a Zulu surname and a sibling, brother Elliott Zwangobani, Australian Sports Commission director, a former futsal player. She attended Cook Primary School, then undertook a drama program at Hawker College, Canberra. From 1985-1988, she trained in dance, many forms, such as ballet, jazz, modern, funk and as a tap dancer, at the Betsy Sawers School of Dance, and with the Human Veins Dance Theatre. In 1989, undertook a Television and Film Workshops course at Broadway Film Studios in Canberra. She furthered her education at the Victorian College of the Arts, graduating in 1992 with a Diploma of arts in dramatic arts (Acting).

== Career ==
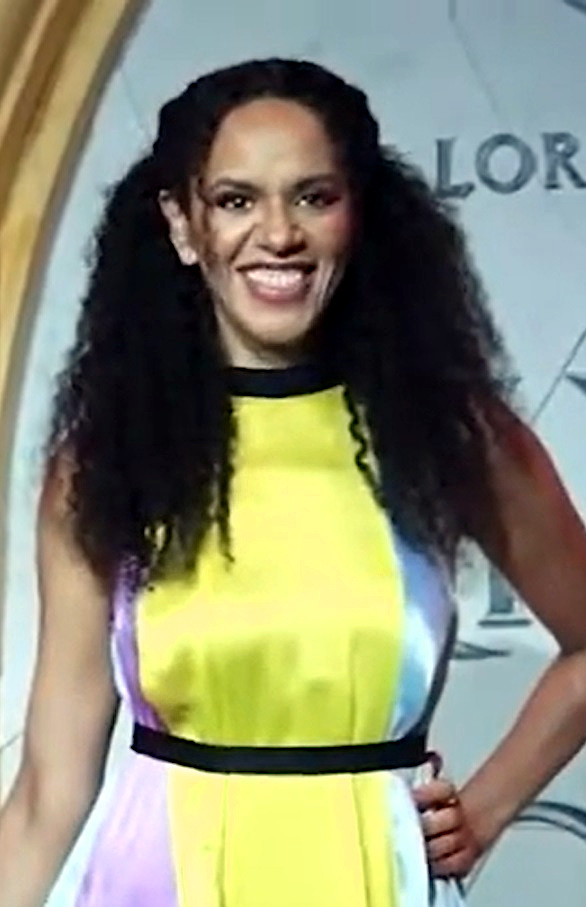
Sara Zwangobani at the LotR-TRoP Asia Premiere 2022

=== Theatre ===
On graduating, Zwangobani was approached by actor John Howard for acting roles for the Sydney Theatre Company. Performances include Summer of the Aliens, The Crucible (2000), Women in Shorts (1997), Pulse 10 (1999), Imago (2001). Girl in Tan Boots for the Griffin Theatre Company, Lyrebird for the Old Fitzroy Theatre, Dirty Butterfly. Zwangobani played Mark Antony in Julius Caesar In 2009, she played Rosetta in the Liv Ullmann directed A Streetcar Named Desire working with Cate Blanchett. In 2010, Zwangobani starred in the Sydney Theatre Company’s production of the Sarah Ruhl play In the Next Room (or The Vibrator Play) directed by Pamela Rabe. Zwangobani played Elizabeth, a wet nurse of the main character

=== Television and film ===
In 1997, she made her debut appearance on television in an episode of Fallen Angels In 2006, she starred as Imogen in six episodes of the Australian drama series Love My Way, which won ‘Best Television Drama Series’ at the Australian Film Institute Awards that year. and won ‘Most Outstanding Drama Program’ at the ASTRA Awards Continuing in 2006, she had a recurring role as Detective Maria Ramos for seven episodes of Lifetime’s prime time telenovela Monarch Cove. She made appearances on Australian television and film in All Saints (2005 & 2009), Nightmares & Dreamscapes: From the Stories of Stephen King (2006), Disgrace (2008), Packed to the Rafters (2009), Soul Mates (2014), Home and Away and Doctor Doctor (2019).

In 2022, She played Marigold Brandyfoot, stepmother of Elanor (Nori) Brandyfoot, played by fellow Australian actress Markella Kavenagh, in Amazon Prime Video's The Lord of the Rings: The Rings of Power. Filming of season 1 was carried out in New Zealand.

== Filmography ==
=== Film ===
Year	Title	Role	Notes
2001	Star Baby	Arial	Short film
2002	The Merchant of Fairness	Danielle	film
2006	One of the Lucky Ones	Hannah	Short film
2008	Disgrace	Young Woman	film
2017	Dance Academy: The Movie	ICU Nurse McDaniel	Film
2020	Grapefruit & Heat Death!	Prof. McLaw	Short film

=== Television ===
Year	Title	Role	Notes
1997	Fallen Angels	Community Liaison	S1 episode 3 – “Smoke Gets In Your Eyes”
2000	Water Rats	Toloti Vivi	S5 episode 28 – “With a Vengence”
2005–2009	All Saints	Carol Graham / Detective Allen	2 episodes
2006	Love My Way	Imogen	6 episodes Wins Best Television Drama Series
2006–2018	Home and Away	Jodi Anderson / Mel Harris	8 episodes
2006	Nightmares & Dreamscapes: From the Stories of Stephen King	News Anchor	1 episode "Road Virus"
2006	Monarch Cove	Detective Maria Ramos	7 episodes
2006	Two Twisted	Sarah	1 episode
2007	The Starter Wife	Debra	1 episode
2007	One of the Lucky Ones	Prosecuting Lawyer	TV movie
2009	Packed to the Rafters	Sonographer /Ultra Sound Technician	2 episodes
2014	Soul Mates	Nancy	Season 1 episode 5 – “Father Time”
2019	Doctor Doctor	Dr. Luisa	S4 episode2 - "Don't Stop Me Now"
2022	The Lord of the Rings: The Rings of Power	Marigold Brandyfoot	6 episodes
