= Rachelle Henry =

American actress and filmmaker

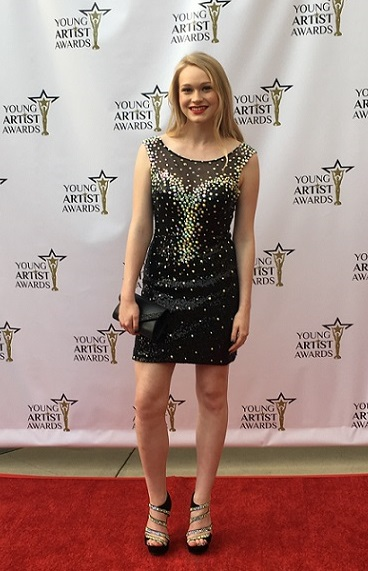
- Henry at the 38th Young Artist Awards in 2017
- Born: December 16, 2000 (age 25); Richland, Washington, U.S.
- Occupations: Actress; filmmaker
- Years active: 2006–present

Rachelle Henry (born December 16, 2000) is an American actress and filmmaker. She portrayed Sandy Hobbs in the TLC documentary series Escaping the Prophet and Lissa Golaski in Depth, a film prequel to the video game Soma developed by Frictional Games. Henry is also recognized for directing and producing socially conscious short films centered on coming-of-age themes, including Missing, Defining Moments, and Almost Boyfriends.

== Early life and career ==
Rachelle Henry was born on December 16, 2000, in Richland, Washington, and raised in Seattle. She began acting, modeling, and training at age six and was cast in the title role of Twelfth Night Productions' Oliver! at age 10. Shortly afterward, she began appearing regularly in television commercials and independent films across the Pacific Northwest.

At 15, Henry won a grant from Adobe Systems to produce a social change-themed project as part of the Adobe Pitch Project in collaboration with Reel Grrls. She wrote, produced, and directed the short film Missing, earning the Best Director award at the 2016 Premio Cinematografico Palena Film Festival in Palena, Italy, and Best Short Film with a Social Message at the 2016 NEZ International Film Festival in Kolkata, India.

Henry received two nominations at the 38th Young Artist Academy Awards and won Best Performance in a Short Film – Teen Actress on March 17, 2017, for her role as Daisy in Jersey Gurl. That same week, the Young Entertainer Awards named her Best Young Actress in a Short Film for her portrayal of Alex, a teenage pickpocket in Grifters, which she also produced. In 2019, she won Best Young Actress for her performance in Mehndi, which premiered at the Seattle International Film Festival and was an official selection at Outfest Los Angeles. She later became the first recipient of the Best Producer award at the 40th Young Artist Academy Awards, where she earned four nominations.

Henry co-starred in several festival-acclaimed projects, including Creased (featured at the 2016 San Diego Asian Film Festival and the HollyShorts Film Festival), Losing It (premiered at Slamdance Film Festival and the Cannes Film Festival Short Film Corner), and Wallflower (2017), in which she portrayed the alter ego of the Capitol Hill Massacre killer. The latter premiered at the Seattle International Film Festival. In 2018, she appeared alongside Willow Shields (The Hunger Games) and Meg DeLacy (The Fosters) in the feature film Woodstock or Bust, named Best Feature Film at the Artemis Film Festival. The same year, she earned a Best Supporting Actress nomination for her role as Molly in My Summer as a Goth.

In 2019, Henry portrayed Lisa Hunt, eldest daughter of Watergate conspirator E. Howard Hunt, in the Starz series Gaslit starring Sean Penn, Julia Roberts, and Dan Stevens. In 2022, she joined the cast of Netflix's Dead to Me as a young woman mirroring Christina Applegate's character, Jen Harding, in hospital flashbacks during her mother’s cancer battle. She also guest-starred as Annie in Justin Theroux's Apple TV+ series The Mosquito Coast, aiding runaway protagonist Dina Fox.

Henry was appointed Junior Editor at We Blab Entertainment Magazine in 2017. She frequently moderates panels and mentors aspiring artists, advocates for youth-focused legislation, and promotes student development initiatives through civic engagements.

== Philanthropy ==
Henry actively supports animal welfare initiatives, notably through partnerships with Emerald City Pet Rescue and P.A.W.S. She also advocates for cancer-related causes, participating in fundraising 5K runs such as Women of Wonder and Run of Hope. Her charitable efforts benefit organizations including The Seattle Children's Hospital and Team Survivor, which focus on supporting women and children affected by cancer.

== Filmography ==
=== Film ===
Year	Title	Role	Notes
2011	Rogue Saints	Lauren	
2012	All My Presidents	Susie	
2012	The Neely Family	Lenore Neely	
2013	Ship Shifters	Catherine Frontier	
2014	Laggies	Bridesmaid	
2015	Caprice	Lisa	Nominee, Best Actress, Claw Award 2015
2015	The Hollow One	Husk	
2015	UnSilent Night	Cyndi	
2015	Creased	Syd	
2016	Depth	Lissa Golaski	
2016	Grifters	Alex	Producer; Winner, Young Entertainer Award
2016	Missing	Maddie	
2016	Tall Men	Alicia Mariotti	
2016	The Book of Judith	Darcie	
2016	Jersey Gurl	Daisy	Producer; Winner, Young Artist Award
2016	Beast	Narrator	Nominee, Young Artist Academy Award
2017	Losing It	Sarah Newton	
2017	Wallflower	Female Murderer	
2017	Viral	Raquel	Post Production
2017	hitched	Britney Bell	Producer
2018	My Summer as a Goth	Molly	
2018	Enigmatic	Alexa Ryan	Nominee, Best Director, Young Entertainer Awards 2019
2018	Mehndi	Amy	
2018	Defining Moments	Ava Reynolds	
2019	Woodstock or Bust	Susan	
2019	Fragile Ghost	Krista Riefenstahl	
2021	Martingale	Maddy	
2021	Bermuda Island	Rey	

=== Television ===
Year	Title	Role	Notes
2014	Escaping the Prophet	Sandy Hobbs	Season 1, Episodes 1-6
2015	Portland Film Beat	Self	Season 2, Episode 1
2015	Transmissions	Lissa Golaski	Season 1, Episodes 3, 5, 6, 7, 8
2016	Dani's Bucket List	Dani Blanchard	Nominee, Young Artist Award 2017 and Young Entertainer Awards 2017 for Best Teen Actress. Episodes: "The Bump", "The Broken Triangle"
2017	Biz Kid$	Various	Season 6, Episodes 1-6
2021	Gaslit	Lisa Hunt	
2022	Dead to Me	Teen Daughter	Season 3, Episode 6
2023	The Mosquito Coast	Annie	Season 2, Episodes 9 & 10

=== Directing credits ===
Year	Title	Notes
2016	Missing	Winner, Best Director, Palena Film Festival 2016
2016	Almost Boyfriends	
2017	Defining Moments	
2018	Enigmatic	Nominee, Best Director, 2019 Young Entertainer Awards

== Awards and nominations ==
Year	Award	Category	Work	Result
2011	Accolade Award	Leading Actress	The Day	Won
2015	Claw Award	Best Actress	Caprice	Nominated
2016	Jury Award, Palena Film Festival 2016	Best Director	MISSING	Won
2017	Young Artist Award	Best New Media Performance - Teen Actress	Dani's Bucket List	Nominated
2017	Young Artist Award	Best Performance in a Short Film - Teen Actress	Jersey Gurl	Won
2017	Young Entertainer Award	Best Young Actress in a Web Performance - 14-Under	Dani's Bucket List	Nominated
2017	Young Entertainer Award	Best Young Actress in a Short Film 14-15	Grifters	Won
2018	Young Artist Award	Best Performance in a Voice-Acting Role - Teen Artist	Beast	Nominated
2018	Young Artist Award	Best Performance in a Short Film - Teen Actress	Hitched	Nominated
2018	Young Entertainer Award	Best Young Director	Defining Moments	Nominated
2018	Young Entertainer Award	Best Young Actress 13-15 - Short Film	Losing It	Nominated
2019	Young Entertainer Award	Best Young Director	Enigmatic	Nominated
2019	Young Entertainer Award	Best Young Actress - Short Film	Mehndi	Won
2019	Young Artist Award	Best Supporting Actress in a Feature Film	My Summer as a Goth	Nominated
2019	Young Artist Award	Best Director	Enigmatic	Nominated
2019	Young Artist Award	Best Writer	Enigmatic	Nominated
2019	Young Artist Award	Best Producer	Enigmatic	Won
