= Paper Girls (TV series) =

American sci-fi tv series (2022)

- Official promotional poster
- Genre: Science fiction; Drama
- Created by: Stephany Folsom
- Based on: Paper Girls by Brian K. Vaughan and illustrated by Cliff Chiang
- Starring: Camryn Jones; Riley Lai Nelet; Sofia Rosinsky; Fina Strazza; Adina Porter
- Music by: Bobby Krlic
- Country of origin: United States
- Original language: English
- No. of seasons: 1
- No. of episodes: 8

Production
- Executive producers: Stephany Folsom; Christopher C. Rogers; Christopher Cantwell; Brad Pitt; Dede Gardner; Jeremy Kleiner; Christina Oh; Brian K. Vaughan; Cliff Chiang; Steve Prinz
- Producer: Vail Romeyn
- Cinematography: Zachary Galler; Tarin Anderson
- Editors: Robert Komatsu; Ivan Victor; Emily E. Greene; Jennifer Barbot
- Running time: 38–56 minutes
- Production companies: Future Investigations; Sorry Dave Productions; Sic Semper Tyrannis; Plan B Entertainment; Legendary Television; Amazon Studios

Original release
- Network: Amazon Prime Video
- Release: July 29, 2022

Paper Girls is an American science fiction drama television series created by Stephany Folsom. It is based on the 2015–2019 comic book series of the same name written by Brian K. Vaughan and illustrated by Cliff Chiang. The series premiered on Amazon Prime Video in 2022 and was canceled after one season.

== Premise ==
Paper Girls follows four young girls who, while out delivering papers during morning after Halloween in 1988, become unwittingly caught in a conflict between warring factions of time-travelers. They go on an adventure through time that will save the world. As they travel between time periods, they encounter future versions of themselves and must choose to embrace or reject their fate.

== Cast and characters ==
=== Main ===
- Camryn Jones as Tiff Quilkin, an African-American girl with a high intellect
- Riley Lai Nelet as Erin Tieng, a Chinese-American girl on her first day delivering newspapers
- Sofia Rosinsky as Mac Coyle, an Irish-American tomboy who lives in the outskirts of Stony Stream
- Fina Strazza as KJ Brandman, a Jewish-American girl whose family owns several businesses in Stony Stream
- Adina Porter as Prioress, a high-ranking officer of the Old Watch

=== Recurring ===
- Ali Wong as adult Erin Tieng, a struggling paralegal in 2019
- Nate Corddry as Larry Radakowski, a farmer and member of the STF Underground
- Sekai Abenì as adult Tiffany Quilkin, a lighting designer in 1999

=== Guest ===
- Kai Young as Heck, a teenage STF Underground soldier who encounters the paper girls in 1988
- William Bennett as Naldo, Heck's comrade
- Celeste Arias as Juniper Plimpton, a female STF Underground soldier
- Cliff Chamberlain as Dylan Coyle, Mac's elder brother who is a successful surgeon in 2019
- Jessika Van as Missy Tieng, Erin's younger sister who works as a pilot in 2019
- Jason Mantzoukas as Grand Father, leader of the Old Watch
- Delia Cunningham as adult KJ Brandman, who becomes a film school student in 1999
- Maren Lord as Lauren, adult KJ's classmate and lover

== Episodes ==
No.	Title	Directed by	Written by	Original release date
1	"Growing Pains"	Georgi Banks-Davies	Teleplay by : Stephany Folsom	July 29, 2022
On November 1, 1988, Erin, Tiff, Mac, and KJ begin their early morning run of delivering The Cleveland Preserver in the neighborhood of Stony Stream. After Erin is jumped by a group of bullies, they enter an unfinished house to recover one of Tiff's walkie-talkies, but they encounter two hooded men. As they retreat to Mac's home for safety, they see the sky suddenly turn pink. When lights start flashing outside the windows, the girls begin to panic, and Mac accidentally shoots Erin with a revolver. As they rush Erin to the hospital, they are captured by the hooded men and brought to the forest. The men are killed in an ambush by assailants known as the "Old Watch", but one of them gives Tiff a device before the girls run away and Erin is miraculously healed by robotic bugs. After KJ inadvertently kills a member of the Old Watch with her hockey stick, the girls rush back to Erin's house, only to encounter Erin's older self in 2019.
2	"Weird Al Is Dead"	Georgi Banks-Davies	Christopher Cantwell & Christopher C. Rogers	July 29, 2022
When Erin discovers that her mother has long passed away, she approaches her future self to learn what happened over the past three decades. Adult Erin allows the girls to stay in the house. Mac bikes across town and discovers that her school has been replaced by a shopping district and her home has been demolished. The next day, after a heated argument between Erin and her adult self, the girls head to Cleveland to meet Tiff's future self when they realize they forgot the device. Meanwhile, adult Erin activates the device, which activates a heads-up display in her eyes before she goes out looking for the girls. At an abandoned mall, the girls reminisce their memories there until Mac reveals that her brother Dylan is now a doctor and bails out on them. After recovering KJ's stick, Prioress enters KJ's home and kills her parents.
3	"Blue Tongues Don't Lie"	Destiny Ekaragha	Lisa Albert	July 29, 2022
In 1988, STF Underground members Larry Radakowski and Juniper Plimpton are forced to abort their mission when the Old Watch close in on their location and they record their information on tape in case their memories are erased. In 2019, Larry fails to make Juniper recover her memories, but learns that the device has been activated. Meanwhile, Mac meets Dylan and discovers that she was supposed to have died of cancer 27 years ago. After picking up the other girls, adult Erin goes to the hospital to look for Mac, but she is nabbed by Larry and the girls chase after him until he lures them in his hideout and captures them. The next morning, Larry realizes that the girls were given the device by his comrades, and he briefs them on the war between the STF and the Old Watch. He tells the girls that they are now targets for traveling out of their time, and shows them a giant robot stored in the barn.
4	"It Was Never About the Corn"	Destiny Ekaragha	K. C. Perry	July 29, 2022
Larry informs adult Erin that she needs to pilot the robot to the year 1999, as the device has paired her to it. This leads to an argument with Tiff proposing to use the robot to take them back to 1988 so they can go home while saving Heck and Naldo from previously getting killed. Erin learns from her adult self that she and her younger sister Missy have not seen eye-to-eye since their mother's death. Meanwhile, Dylan discusses with Mac on keeping her in his family, but their interaction with Dylan's daughters causes Mac to resent her more mature brother. Missy pays adult Erin a visit at Larry's farm when KJ runs off to look for Mac. Erin witnesses her adult self and Missy fight over the rift between them. KJ meets up with Mac and brings her back to the farm before Prioress chases after them. The girls are reunited just in time for them, adult Erin, and Larry to take the robot into a time fold.
5	"A New Period"	Karen Gaviola	Kai Yu Wu	July 29, 2022
The robot exits the time fold, but an Old Watch robot shows up and kills Larry before adult Erin engages it in a robot fight and sacrifices herself to save the girls. As Old Watch soldiers led by Grand Father and Prioress surround the wreckage, Tiff rushes to retrieve Larry's backpack, which contains the log book of time fold coordinates. The Old Watch activates the ablution device to wipe the town of any memories of the time war, but just as before, the girls are not affected by it. Just as they argue over fulfilling their mission to save Heck and Naldo, they realize that they arrived on July 3, 1999, and Erin begins to experience her first period. The girls head to KJ's home, where her family is hosting a tiki party. While Tiff studies the logbook, Erin and Mac start stealing cash and supplies in the house and KJ meets her adult self's classmate Lauren. KJ also discovers that she is a lesbian before the girls leave. Shocked at her own revelation, KJ punches Mac in the face during an argument. Tiff makes a phone call to her adult self.
6	"Matinee"	Karen Gaviola	Christopher Cantwell & Stephany Folsom & Christopher C. Rogers	July 29, 2022
The girls arrive at a private rave party, where Tiff meets up with her adult self and explains the situation to her and adult Tiff has them sleep at her apartment. The next day, KJ goes to the theater to watch a Stanley Kubrick marathon and sees her adult self and Lauren a few rows in front of her. Both Tiffs pay 1999 Larry a visit to get the cipher for the log book. Back at the apartment, adult Tiff confesses to her younger self that she dropped out of MIT and became a DJ while working on an online educational startup. Mac reveals to KJ everything Dylan told her in 2019. Both Tiffs decode the next time fold to be 2006, much to Erin's dismay. Back at the farm, Larry witnesses the sky turn pink and sees Erin's bicycle and newspapers from 1988 fall before him.
7	"Some Kind of Burping Trash Hole"	Mairzee Almas	Christopher Cantwell & Christopher C. Rogers	July 29, 2022
Adult Tiff reveals to her younger self that she was adopted and she was expelled from MIT. Mac goes with KJ to the cemetery to visit her own grave, but they encounter her stepmother Alice before running away. Larry brings Erin to the farm to show her the anomaly in the sky, which is identified as a Class 2 time rip. The two Tiffs and the other girls head to the farm, and Juniper warns everyone that the Old Watch is on its way to execute the girls.
8	"It B Over"	Mairzee Almas	Stephany Folsom	July 29, 2022
Juniper uses Tiff's walkie-talkie to contact Heck and Naldo, but a return signal reveals that it was her voice that the girls heard back in 1988 before the first incident and they are in the middle of a time loop. Mac and KJ encounter Prioress and Grand Father, who offer them a return to their timeline, but Grand Father briefs them on what the Old Watch is preventing the STF from doing to the universe. Tiff gives her older self the log book before the latter and Juniper are taken away in an ablution beam. Mac and KJ turn down Grand Father's offer on the basis that everyone has a freedom of choice. Larry threatens Grand Father and Prioress at gunpoint, but is killed by Grand Father's pterodactyl Tessa while the girls run to the basement. Mac reveals her illness to Erin and Tiff before the girls regroup and surrender to the Old Watch. Aboard the ship, Prioress betrays the Old Watch and gives the girls a chance to escape before she is shot by one of the guards. Erin and Tiff rush to heal Prioress with a jar of robotic bugs, but they end up locked out of the time capsule. Prioress sends Erin and Tiff in another capsule before Grand Father kills her. Erin and Tiff return to Stony Stream, only to realize that it is the 1970s.

== Production ==
=== Development ===
On July 11, 2019, it was announced that Amazon Studios had put the project in development with a series commitment, with Brian K. Vaughan, who wrote the original comic book series, executive producing the project under his overall deal with Legendary Entertainment. It was also announced that Stephany Folsom would write the series, as well as executive produce alongside Vaughan. On July 23, 2020, the project was officially greenlit to series, with Cliff Chiang, Christopher Cantwell, and Christopher C. Rogers joining as executive producers. On July 31, 2021, it was reported that Folsom had exited the series. On September 9, 2022, Amazon Prime Video canceled the series after one season, with Legendary Television shopping it around to other networks.

=== Casting ===
On April 26, 2021, it was announced that Sofia Rosinsky, Camryn Jones, Riley Lai Nelet, and Fina Strazza were cast in the four lead roles. On May 6, 2021, Ali Wong joined the main cast. On June 15, 2021, Nate Corddry was cast in a starring role.

=== Filming ===
The series was initially set to begin filming on March 1, 2021 in Chicago, Illinois but was later pushed back to May 17, 2021. On May 28, 2021, photography took place in and around the Joliet police station. The series concluded filming on October 1, 2021.

== Release ==
The series was released on Amazon Prime Video on July 29, 2022.

== Reception ==
The review aggregator website Rotten Tomatoes reported an 87% approval rating with an average rating of 6.9/10, based on 70 critic reviews. The website's critics consensus reads, "Folding together time-traveling wonder with a strong ensemble of youngsters who are as dimensional as origami, Paper Girls is an absolute blast to the future." Metacritic, which uses a weighted average, assigned a score of 70 out of 100 based on 20 critics, indicating "generally favorable reviews".
