= Jax Malcolm =

American actor

- Born: July 12, 2003 (age 22); West Covina, California, U.S.
- Occupation(s): Actor, musician.
- Years active: 2010–present

Jax Malcolm (born July 12, 2003) is an American actor, singer and competitive swimmer who is best known for his roles in Kroll Show, Comedy Bang! Bang!, The Birthday Boys and Crazy Ex-Girlfriend, and for voicing Oliver in The Other Side of the Door.

== Early life and education ==
Jax Malcolm was born July 12, 2003, in West Covina, California. He first showed an interest in acting at the age of 5 after asking his parents why he was not on television like other children. From there, his family hired an agent, which led to his first appearance in a PSA for Smart Power.

== Acting career ==
His first acting credits include roles in the 2010 film Dark Crossing and the TV shows Redeeming Dave, Comedy Bang! Bang! and Kroll Show. By the age of 12, Jax had also appeared in The Birthday Boys, Crazy Ex-Girlfriend and About Scout.

In 2015, Jax guest starred in an episode of The League titled "The Great Night of Shiva". His appearance on this episode earned him a nomination to the 2016 Young Entertainer Awards for Best Guest Starring Young Actor 12 to 14 – Television Series, though he would ultimately lose the award to Graham Verchere.

In 2016, Jax was cast by the director of The Other Side of the Door, Johannes Roberts, to voice the main antagonist, Oliver. The film is set in Mumbai and portrays antiques dealer Jeremy Sisto as Michael and Sarah Wayne Callies as Maria as they find themselves the grieving parents of a deceased son. This role marked Jax's debut as a voice actor as well as his debut in a film produced by a major film studio (20th Century Fox).

== Other endeavors ==
Jax released his first music EP on Amazon Music and the iTunes store titled Jax Malcolm Holiday EP.

Jax Malcolm is also a competitive swimmer and lifeguard who has qualified to the Junior Olympics.

== Personal life ==
Jax currently lives in Tarzana, California, with his parents.

== Filmography ==
=== Film ===
Year	Title	Role	Notes
2010	Dark Crossing	School Child 9	
2011	Love is All You Need? (Short)	David	
2014	Grooming (Short)		
2015	About Scout		
2016	The Other Side of The Door	Oliver (Voice)	

=== Television ===
Year	Title	Role	Notes
2012	Vild med comedy	Birthday Boy	
2013	Redeeming Dave	Bedeazzled Boy	
2013	The Birthday Boys	Buddy's Son	
2013	Comedy Bang! Bang!	Birthday Boy	
2013	Westside (TV Movie)	Young Josh Nance Age 8	
2014	Kroll Show	Curly-Haired Boy / Get Oot Kid	
2015	Crazy Ex-Girlfriend	Jason	
2015	The League	Future Chalupa	
