= 38th Young Artist Awards =

2017 US media awards ceremony

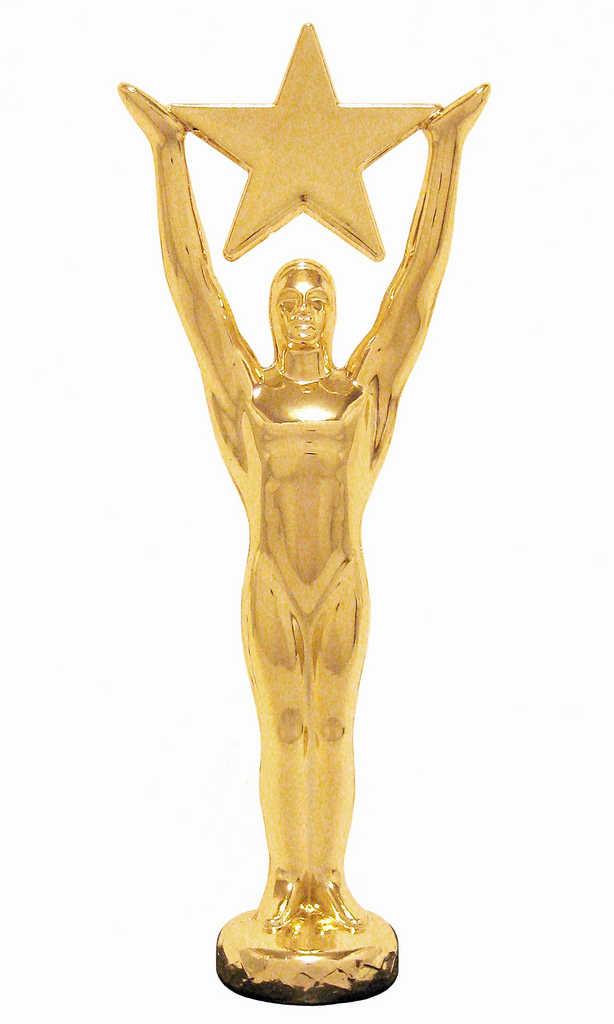
- Awarded for: Achievement during the year 2016 in film and television
- Date: March 17, 2017
- Site: Alex Theatre; Glendale, California
- Hosted by: Mark Christopher Lawrence

The 38th Young Artist Awards ceremony, presented by the Young Artist Association, honored excellence of young performers between the ages of 5 and 18 in the fields of film, television, theatre and the internet for the 2016 calendar year. Winners were announced on March 17, 2017, at the annual ceremony and banquet luncheon held at the Alex Theatre in Glendale, California.

== Winners and nominees ==
★ Winners were announced on March 17, 2017.

=== Best Performance in a Feature Film ===
Best Performance in a Feature Film – Leading Young Actor	Best Performance in a Feature Film – Leading Young Actress
★ Julian Feder – A Boy Called Po: Oakes Fegley – Pete's Dragon; Edouard Holdener – Hunky Dory; Sunny Pawar – Lion; Neel Sethi – The Jungle Book; Jacob Tremblay – Before I Wake	★ Sofia Rosinsky – The Other Side of the Door: Ruby Barnhill – The BFG; Kyla Kenedy – Love Is All You Need?; Olivia Presti – Odd Squad: The Movie
Best Performance in a Feature Film – Leading Teen Actor	Best Performance in a Feature Film – Leading Teen Actress
★ Jackson Martin – Sleeping Giant: Michael Barbieri – Little Men; Julian Dennison – Hunt for the Wilderpeople; Griffin Gluck – Middle School: The Worst Years of My Life; Jaeden Lieberher – The Confirmation; Theo Taplitz – Little Men	★ Oona Laurence – Pete's Dragon: Samantha Isler – Captain Fantastic; Aisholpan Nurgaiv – The Eagle Huntress
Best Performance in a Feature Film – Supporting Young Actor	Best Performance in a Feature Film – Supporting Young Actress
★ Caleb Brown – Mother's Day: Jack Fulton – Closet Monster; Charlie Shotwell – Captain Fantastic	★ Alexa Nisenson – Middle School: The Worst Years of My Life: Shree Crooks – Captain Fantastic; Kylie Rogers – Fathers and Daughters
Best Performance in a Feature Film – Supporting Teen Actor	Best Performance in a Feature Film – Supporting Teen Actress
★ Seth Lee – The Accountant: Thomas Barbusca – Middle School: The Worst Years of My Life; Nicholas Hamilton – Captain Fantastic; Alex R. Hibbert – Moonlight; Kai Norris – The Birth of a Nation; Jacob Rodier – Love Is All You Need?	★ Clare Foley – The Great Gilly Hopkins: Ava Allan – Love Is All You Need?; Annalise Basso – Captain Fantastic; Amanda Buhs – Wig'd Out

=== Best Performance in a Digital TV Series or Film ===
Best Performance in a Digital TV Series or Film – Young Actor	Best Performance in a Digital TV Series or Film – Young Actress
★ Hunter Payton – Who's Driving Doug: Aiden Lovekamp – Just Add Magic; Tyler Mazzei – Fun Size Horror; Dean Petriw – Kindergarten Cop 2; Noah Schnapp – Stranger Things	★ Pilot Paisley Rose – All Hallow's Eve: Millie Bobby Brown – Stranger Things; Chalet L. Brannan – Tinker; Jolie Ledford – A Doggone Christmas; Madeline Lupi – The Girl in the Cornfield
Best Performance in a Digital TV Series or Film – Teen Actor	Best Performance in a Digital TV Series or Film – Teen Actress
★ Sloane Morgan Siegel – Gortimer Gibbon's Life on Normal Street: Gaten Matarazzo – Stranger Things; Caleb McLaughlin – Stranger Things; Nicholas Neve – Boonville Redemption; John Paul Ruttan – Against The Wild 2; Finn Wolfhard – Stranger Things	★ Karlee Roberts – Little Miss Perfect: Natalia Dyer – Stranger Things; Lexi DiBenedetto – Martyrs; Savannah Kennick – Holidays; Alexis Rosinsky – My Best Friend

=== Best Performance in a Short Film ===
Best Performance in a Short Film – Young Actor	Best Performance in a Short Film – Young Actress
★ Christian Michael Cooper – Sidekick: Tyler Mazzei – Spin Cycle; Razvan Orban – Inward Edward; Lucas Royalty – Charming; Brandin Stennis – Straight Outta Oz; Aiden Cumming-Teicher – Always There	★ Stephanie Cood – Millennium: Eternal Sunrise: Carissa Bazler – Glory in the Shadows; Isabella Bazler – Milvio; Allison James – Magnolia's Dollhouse; Julia Jordan – Isa and the Frog Prince; Chalet L. Brannan – My Panda
Best Performance in a Short Film – Teen Actor	Best Performance in a Short Film – Teen Actress
★ Donovan Brown – Grandpa Was Here: Brecht Dael – Flying Rats; Matt Goldwyn – Nowhere Café; Toby Nichols – Arrow of Light; Daniel Rovira – If I Retaliate; Robin de Zwart – Peakers	★ Rachelle Henry – Jersey Gurl: Tara-Nicole Azarian – The Golden Plates; Isabella Blake-Thomas – The Blimp Trap; Tori Griffith – Lost Girls; Lizzy Kay – Elle; Madison Mae – Remnants

=== Best Performance in a TV Movie or Special ===
Best Performance in a TV Movie or Special – Young Actor	Best Performance in a TV Movie or Special – Young Actress
★ Christian Convery – Christmas List: Samuel Faraci – An American Girl Story; Jonah Wineberg – The Night Before Halloween	★ Madison Brydges – Love You Like Christmas: Chiara Aurelia – Secret Summer; Madison Horcher – Adventures in Babysitting; Shahadi Wright Joseph – Hairspray Live!; Jaeda Lily Miller – A Heavenly Christmas

=== Best Performance in a TV Series ===
Best Performance in a TV Series – Leading Young Actor	Best Performance in a TV Series – Leading Young Actress
★ Ethan Hutchison – Queen Sugar: Miles Brown – Black-ish; Ian Chen – Fresh Off the Boat; Albert Tsai – Dr. Ken; Forrest Wheeler - Fresh Off The Boat	★ Aalyrah Caldwell – Uncle Buck: Julia Butters – American Housewife; Ashley Gerasimovich – The Detour; Marsai Martin – Black-ish; Olivia Presti – Odd Squad
Best Performance in a TV Series – Leading Teen Actor	Best Performance in a TV Series – Leading Teen Actress
★ Hudson Yang – Fresh Off The Boat: Liam Carroll – The Detour; Daniel DiMaggio – American Housewife; Marcus Scribner – Black-ish; Jake Sim – Raising Expectations; Jaheem King Toombs – 100 Things To Do Before High School	★ Julia Tomasone – Backstage: Meg Donnelly – American Housewife; Emilia McCarthy – Max and Shred; Yara Shahidi – Black-ish; Erika Tham – Make It Pop
Best Performance in a TV Series – Supporting Young Actor	Best Performance in a TV Series – Supporting Young Actress
★ Anthony LaPenna – Black-ish: Christian Convery – Supernatural; Matt Raymond – Kim's Convenience	★ Saniyya Sidney – Roots: Alyce Donoghue – Mr. D; Faith Donoghue – Mr. D
Best Performance in a TV Series – Guest Starring Young Actor	Best Performance in a TV Series – Guest Starring Young Actress
★ Ian Chen – Loosely Exactly Nicole: Jack Fulton – Killjoys; Gunnar Goldberg – Grey's Anatomy; Maverick Thompson – Criminal Minds; Keith Williams – Teachers	★ Sanai Victoria – Lab Rats: Elite Force: Isabella Crovetti – Scorpion; Ava Kolker – Girl Meets World; Isabella Kai Rice – Dr. Ken; Sofia Rosinsky – Criminal Minds: Beyond Borders; Ashlyn Faith Williams – School of Rock
Best Performance in a TV Series – Guest Starring Teen Actor	Best Performance in a TV Series – Guest Starring Teen Actress
★ Rio Mangini – Teen Wolf: Ashton Arbarb – Mutt & Stuff; Zachary Conneen – Gamer's Guide to Pretty Much Everything; Jaedon Siewert – Odd Squad; Amarr Wooten – Bunk'd; Bryce Xavier – Family Time	★ Haley Brooke Walker – Chicago Med: Johnnie Ladd – Gamer's Guide to Pretty Much Everything; Leah Lewis – Best Friends Whenever; Sydney Mikayla – Game Shakers; Chloe Noelle – New Girl; Ciara Wilson – Bizaardvark
Best Performance in a TV Series – Recurring Young Actor	Best Performance in a TV Series – Recurring Young Actress
★ Carter Ryan Evancic – When Calls the Heart: Jared Breeze – The Young and the Restless; Parker Bates – This Is Us; Lonnie Chavis – This Is Us; Jack Fulton – 11.22.63; Christian Ganiere – Days of Our Lives	★ Asia Monet Ray – Grey's Anatomy: Siena Agudong – Nicky, Ricky, Dicky & Dawn; Mackenzie Hancsicsak – This Is Us; Michela Luci – Odd Squad
Best Performance in a TV Series – Recurring Teen Actor	Best Performance in a TV Series – Recurring Teen Actress
★ Trevor Larcom – Fresh Off The Boat: Luka Limoges – Subito Texto; Rio Mangini – Bella and the Bulldogs; Toby Nichols – Underground; Jordan Poole – Mr. D; Zachary S. Williams – Greenleaf	★ LuLu Lambros – Stuck in the Middle: Clare Foley – Gotham; Katelyn Nacon – The Walking Dead; Imogen Tear – When Calls the Heart

=== Best Performance in a TV Commercial ===
Best Performance in a TV Commercial – Young Actor/Actress

★ Gunnar Goldberg – Subaru

- Aalyrah Caldwell – Free To Dream
- Aiden Lovekamp – Home Depot
- Sydney Mikayla – Best Buy
- Brandin Stennis – The Unexpected John Cena Prank
- Lauren Thompson – Royale Velour

=== Best Performance in a Voice-Over Role ===
Best Performance in a Voice-Over Role – Young Actor	Best Performance in a Voice-Over Role – Young Actress
★ Samuel Faraci – Rusty Rivets: Devan Cohen – PAW Patrol; David Raynolds – United Way; Jonah Wineberg – Ranger Rob	★ Ciara Alexys – Luna Petunia: Mila Brener – Shimmer and Shine; Isabella Crovetti – Shimmer and Shine; Jaeda Lily Miller – Ready Jet Go; Nicole Sherman – Little People; Sanai Victoria – Little People
Best Performance in a Voice-Over Role – Teen Actor	Best Performance in a Voice-Over Role – Teen Actress
★ Grant Palmer – The Loud House: Jaden Betts – Only Yesterday; Max Calinescu – PAW Patrol; Jax Malcolm – The Other Side of the Door; Rio Mangini – Lasso & Comet	★ Berkley Silverman – PAW Patrol: Auli'i Cravalho – Moana; Kate Scott – Suspense; Sarah Sheppard – Doki Adventures; Hannah Swain – Ruff Ruff Tweet & Dave Christmas Special

=== Best New Media Performance ===
Best New Media Performance – Young Actor	Best New Media Performance – Young Actress
★ Bradley Bundlie – Danny the Manny: George Dalton – PoliKiDz; Wyatt McClure – Between 2 Phat Kids; Bryson Robinson – Class Dismissed	★ Lauren Thompson – BMO CAO: Sarah Bazler – 13 Stories; Caige Coulter – Funny or Die; Gabriela Francis – Kids On; Carmina Garay – Human Virtues
Best New Media Performance – Teen Actor	Best New Media Performance – Teen Actress
★ Walker Satterwhite – Junk Drawer Magic: Nicolas Fontaine – Marc-en-peluche; Brice Fisher – Between 2 Phat Kids; Joshua Pickel – Or So The Story Goes; Lofton Shaw – Because I Told You So	★ Cassandra Tusa – Jenny & Jeff: Ashlyn Boots – PoliKiDz; Rachelle Henry – Dani's Bucket List; Teagan Sirset – Things You Wish You Could Control in High School; Ciara Wilson – OMG! Zen Jen; Paris Smith – Small Girls Club
