= Reel Stories =

US non-profit organization

- Formation: 2013
- Founder: Esther Pearl
- Tax ID no.: 94-2403876
- Legal status: Non-profit organization
- Headquarters: Oakland, California, U.S.
- Region served: San Francisco Bay Area, California, U.S.
- Website: reel-stories.com
- Formerly called: Camp Reel Stories

Reel Stories, formerly Camp Reel Stories, is a filmmaking program for girls and non-binary youth aged 12–19 years old. Reel Stories seeks to close a gender gap in the film industry and empower youth to create media in a supportive environment.

== Summer camp ==
Their summer camp takes place in both Oakland and Los Angeles. The camp is divided into a beginners camp and an advanced camp.

== History ==
Reel Stories was founded in 2013 by Esther Pearl.

In 2021, Reel Stories merged with the Bay Area Video Coalition.

== See also ==
- Women in film
- Bechdel test
- Reel Grrls
- Bay Area Video Coalition
