= Paper Girls =

Comic book series

- Cliff Chiang's cover to issue #1. Left to right: Mac, KJ, Tiffany, and Erin.

Publication information
- Publisher: Image Comics
- Schedule: Monthly
- Genre: Mystery, science fiction
- Publication date: October 2015 – July 2019
- No. of issues: 30

Creative team
- Created by: Brian K. Vaughan and Cliff Chiang
- Written by: Brian K. Vaughan
- Artist: Cliff Chiang
- Colorist: Matt Wilson

Collected editions
- Volume One: ISBN 1-63215-674-1
- Volume Two: ISBN 1-63215-895-7
- Volume Three: ISBN 1-5343-0223-9
- Volume Four: ISBN 1-5343-0510-6
- Volume Five: ISBN 1-5343-0867-9
- Volume Six: ISBN 1-5343-1324-9

Paper Girls is a mystery/science fiction comic book series created by Brian K. Vaughan and Cliff Chiang, and published by Image Comics. The colorist is Matt Wilson, the letterer and designer is Jared K. Fletcher, and the color flatter is Dee Cunniffe. The series began publication on October 7, 2015 and concluded on July 31, 2019 with issue #30.

Paper Girls follows the story of four 12-year-old newspaper delivery girls (Erin, MacKenzie, KJ, and Tiffany) set in Stony Stream, a fictional suburb of Cleveland, Ohio. As they are out delivering papers on the morning after Halloween, the town is struck by an invasion from a mysterious force from the future. The girls become unwillingly caught up in the conflict between two warring factions of time travelers.

In 2016, Paper Girls received the Eisner Award for Best New Series and Best Penciller/Inker as well as the Harvey Award for Best New Series. A television adaptation premiered in July 2022 and ran for one season.

== Synopsis ==
Erin Tieng, a new resident of Stony Stream, is a recently hired paper delivery girl. While out delivering newspapers in the early hours of the morning of November 1, 1988, Erin meets Mac, KJ, and Tiffany, a group of friends and fellow paper girls who invite Erin to join them.

The girls are soon attacked by a group of teenagers; one of the teens steals a walkie-talkie from Tiffany. The girls subsequently chase the group to a construction house and find what appears to be a time machine in the basement. They are then struck by mysterious energy emanating from the machine. The girls learn that the teenagers are time travelers from the distant future, who are engaged in an ongoing war with a group known as the "Old-Timers" (known as "The Battle of the Ages"). At the center of this conflict is the question of whether or not the past can and should be changed by future time travelers.

Throughout the series, the girls are frequently (and usually, inadvertently) time-displaced, traveling between the 20th and 21st centuries, as well as eras of the distant past and future. As they travel through time, they encounter future versions of themselves and are forced to come to terms with who they will later become. Their lives also become intertwined with those of Wari and Jahpo, two "Old-Timers" who lead the war against their future descendants.

== Characters ==
=== Main ===
- Erin Tieng: A new resident of Stony Stream, she has a younger sister, Missy, of whom she is very protective. Erin is Chinese-American. She has maternal instincts and tends to follow the rules. She attends a Catholic school called St. Nick's and carries a pocketknife. She later learns that her future self in 2016 is unmarried, still works for the Cleveland Preserver, and struggles with anxiety, for which she takes medication. When Clone Erin scatters the paper girls to different times, Erin is transported back to Halloween in 2017. Erin realizes she must return to the house where she met Heck and Naldo; at the house, she discovers a rift in time which brings her face-to-face with Grand Father. Erin reveals to Grand Father that time travel was invented by his "mother", Doctor Qanta Braunstein. When Grand Father shoots an Editrix, he and Erin are transported to a deserted, 19th century Stony Stream where Erin reunites with her friends. Before her memory is wiped, Erin remarks that "Eve was right"; she is then returned to November 1, 1988. Erin meets the other paper girls for the "first" time. After spending the morning together, Erin convinces the others to stay just a little while longer, hanging out as friends.
- MacKenzie "Mac" Coyle: A cigarette-smoking tomboy who swears constantly, Mac was the first girl to become a paperboy in Stony Stream. Cynical and snarky, Mac comes from a blue-collar Irish-Catholic family. She deeply admires her older brother. In 2016, Mac is told she will die of leukemia; however, while in 2171 AD, she learns she actually has a rare, untreatable cancer called "4DC", which only affects time travelers. She makes homophobic comments, and pushed KJ to the ground when she comes out to her, though it is hinted that she may reciprocate KJ's feelings. Eventually, the two kiss in 2171 AD. Mac is later sent to the distant future just prior to the death of the Earth where she reunites with Dr. Braunstein. Following Dr. Braunstein's death, Mac attempts to use Dr. Braunstein's time machine to travel back to 1988. Instead, Mac is rerouted to a deserted, 19th century Stony Stream to be reunited with her friends. She and KJ share a final kiss. Mac admits she is happy to have her memory wiped, as she will no longer be weighed down by the knowledge of when she will die. After being sent back to November 1, 1988, Mac dreams of attending KJ's bat mitzvah, where the two slow-dance and KJ tells Mac that Mac loves her. Mac also dreams of Erin and Tiffany, the latter of who tells Mac not to forget that they're not just paper girls. Later, Mac reunites with KJ and the others. After spending the morning together, she agrees they should hang out just a little while longer.
- Karina "KJ" J. Brandman: Considered the "rich one" of the group, KJ attends a private school (Buttonwood Academy), plays field hockey, and is Jewish. She carries her field hockey stick at all times and occasionally uses it as a weapon. KJ's grandmother is a Holocaust survivor. While in first grade, KJ witnessed her cousin drown. In 11,706 BCE, KJ touches a futuristic device that shows glimpses of her future. This leads her to come to the realization that she is a lesbian and has feelings for Mac, which puts a strain on their friendship. In 2171 AD, KJ and Mac kiss. When she is sent to 1958, KJ seeks out Charlotte in order to find her way back home, where she later meets Jude, who helps transport KJ to a deserted, 19th century Stony Stream. KJ is briefly reunited with her friends and shares a kiss with Mac. Her memory is then wiped and she is returned to the morning of November 1, 1988. Once again, KJ reunites with her fellow paper girls after they save her from a group of teenage bullies. After spending the morning together, she decides to stay with Mac and her "new" friends for a little while longer.
- Tiffany "Tiff" Quilkin: Is a smart obsessive gamer who loves her walkie-talkies, Tiffany is African-American and the adopted daughter of a mixed-race family. She attends a Catholic school called St. Pete's. When Tiffany is briefly held captive by a futuristic device, she is shown her past; Tiffany is discouraged to realize she had thus far just spent her life playing video games. In 2000, she discovers that her older self has adopted a Goth style, attended Stern, and married a man named Chris. Prior to the age of 13, her parents force her to give up her paper route. After being sent to the distant future, she encounters a second Clone Erin. This Clone Erin introduces Tiffany to her companions: the third clone of Erin (age 16), a clone of KJ (age 42), and 2000-Tiffany (now an elderly woman). Tiffany realizes that the girls' strange dreams were all messages sent by the clones in order to guide them to where they are now. Tiffany is persuaded to help the clones and her older self by sending messages to her friends in order to reunite them all. After discovering her memory is to be wiped, Tiffany tries to force herself not to forget by repeatedly stating "we're not just paper girls, we're friends". Back in November 1988, Tiffany meets Erin and gives Erin her walkie-talkie. Tiffany then confesses to the others that she has decided to give up being a paper girl, wanting to just "be" for a while. Despite this, Tiffany agrees to hang out with the group for the rest of the morning.

=== War factions ===
==== Old-Timers ====
The "Old-Timers" (also known as "WATCH" in 2171 AD) are the first generation following the invention of time travel. They strongly believe in preserving the original timeline and strictly enforce the rules regarding time travel. They cannot travel to their own futures. Their leader is known by the title of "Grand Father". A sub-sect of Old-Timers are known as Restorers, who actively work to restore timelines altered by the events of the war. The Restorers have the ability to erase and alter a person's memory. Old-Timers speak in a modified version of English, heavily dependent on slang and similar to Old English in style. Some of them can also speak 21st century English if asked. When Clone Erin (first generation) scatters the girls to separate past/present timelines, she causes the Old-Timers to become stuck inside the fourth dimension. The Old-Timers' base, "the Cathedral", is later destroyed when Grand Father misguidedly shoots an Editrix. However, all of the occupants of the cathedral are saved and restored to their original time. They later come to a truce with the Teenagers via Grand Father, who agrees to ban time travel forever.

- Jahpo: The current "Grand Father". His speech and attire are seemingly more in line with the 20th/21st century than his charges. He is actually the son of Wari and was born in 11,706 BCE, though this is unknown to him and everyone else. As a baby, Jahpo was saved by the girls and Dr. Braunstein when a group of men from Wari's tribe attempted to kill him in a misguided sacrifice. Jahpo alleges he is under the command of the Editrixes. He does not believe Erin when she states that his "mother" Dr. Braunstein invented time travel, not the Editrixes. He shoots at an Editrix in order to save one his crew members, which leads to him being transported to a deserted, 19th-century version of Stony Stream. While there, he touches an Editrix and is shown the truth of his origin. Expressing regret, he agrees to end the war with the teenagers by abolishing time travel forever.
- Wari: Publicly known as Jahpo's "big sister", she is actually a woman from 11,706 BCE and Jahpo's mother, having birthed him when she was 12 years old. Wari originally meets and is helped by the paper girls when they inadvertently jumped to Wari's original time period. At some point, Wari is brought to the future by Dr. Braunstein in an effort to help protect Jahpo from the inherent dangers of 11,706 BCE. Wari spent some years hiding in Indonesia with Dr. Braunstein as her "mother". She and Jahpo later return to Cleveland where they reside in 2171 AD. Wari is bequeathed with Dr. Braunstein's time travel machine following Dr. Braunstein's death. She then uses it to go back in time and prevent the paper girls from being hit by a car on the morning of November 1, 1988.
- Prioress: A commander in Jahpo's army who is romantically involved with Jahpo. She is killed during a battle on New Year's Eve in 1999/2000.

==== Teenagers ====
The descendants of the Old-Timers, from the 71st century; Grand Father refers to them as this regardless of age. They believe in the idea of altering history. Unlike the Old-Timers, teenagers do not have any rules regarding time travel. They often seek the assistance of "locals" (people living in the present time) to provide them with information for the war effort. They speak in a futuristic language that is only decipherable through translation gadgets. They have the ability to clone humans. At some unknown point in time, a small group of clones and 2000-Tiffany gain the ability to transmit coded messages to the paper girls in the past via bizarre dreams. This was done in order to covertly guide the paper girls to their destiny. This group of clones and 2000-Tiffany help to end the war by convincing Grand Father to ban all time travel forever, believing such power should never be abused again. They then erase the memories of the paper girls and return the girls to their original timeline.

- Heck, Naldo, and Jude: Teenagers from the distant future. They are infected with a mysterious illness ("4DC", a rare cancer that only affects time travelers). Although they speak in an unknown, futuristic language, they are able to use a translation stone to speak to "locals". Jude travels back to 1958 where he meets Charlotte Spachefski. Jude is able to speak modern English (which he calls "Oldenglish") without a translator. While in 1958, he also meets a time-displaced KJ; he agrees to help KJ reunite with her friends. KJ later informs Jude of his future death and the death of his friends, Heck and Naldo. After meeting Erin in 1988, Heck and Naldo briefly transport Erin to their original time and help Erin heal her gunshot wound by using electronic bugs called iNsecs. They both later die from injuries sustained in a time jump after returning Erin to 1988. Heck and Naldo are also responsible for the creation of the first generation Clone Erin.
- Charlotte "Chuck" Spachefski: A baby boomer cartoonist whose work is featured in the Cleveland Preserver. She took over drawing and writing the comic strip Frankie Tomatah from her father. In 1958, she encounters Jude, a time traveler from 70,000 AD who is hiding in her basement. Jude teaches her about "The Battle of the Ages" and how to protect herself from the Old-Timers. Charlotte learns the origin of "foldings" (rifts in time) and where to find them; this information allows her to leave clues in her comics to aid the teenagers against the Old-Timers. She attempts to kill the girls in 2000, though they escape. She is later killed by an Old-Timer.
- Clone Erin (First Generation, 12 years old): The first clone of Erin. Originally from the 71st century, she travels back to 2016 in search of the girls. She alleges that the girls are important to the ongoing war between teenagers and Old-Timers. She attempts to recruit them for the war effort, but the other girls mistrust her and manage to send her back to her original time. Unbeknownst to the girls, Clone Erin secretly tracks them through time. In 2171 AD, after tricking and luring the girls to her location, she scatters them to four separate time periods.
- Clone Erin (Unknown Generation, 12 years old): A "descendant" of the first Clone Erin. She meets Tiffany in the distant future beyond the 71st century and explains to her that the war ended some time prior, thanks to the efforts of the paper girls and this Clone Erin's companions. Her group created a dream-message machine, which allowed 2000-Tiffany to send bizarrely, coded messages to the paper girls in the past, covertly guiding them. Later, Clone Erin and her group convince Grand Father to end the war by calling a truce: a permanent ban on all-time travel.
- Clone Erin (Unknown Generation, 16 years old): Another "descendant" of the first Clone Erin who works alongside the other Clone Erin descendant and one of the creators of the dream-message machine. She helps end the time travel war, though is disappointed that she does not get to participate in one final, decisive battle.
- Clone KJ (Unknown Generation, 42 years old): A clone who works alongside both Clone Erin descendants and one of the creators of the dream-message machine. She explains to Tiffany that they had attempted millions of times to change the past but were always unsuccessful. Along with the others, she helps end the time war. She believes that KJ's memories being wiped is for the best, as KJ would otherwise grow up with crushing guilt about the man she killed while protecting Wari and Jahpo in the distant past.
- 2000-Tiffany: Tiffany's future self. After being saved by the girls from a battle between the Old-Timers and teenagers on January 1, 2000, she decides to travel with and assist the girls. She is believed to have been killed in 2171 AD while protecting the girls from a police officer, however, she is saved at the last moment and brought to live in the future after the time war. It was 2000-Tiffany who was responsible for sending coded messages to the paper girls via bizarre dreams. Alongside a small group of clones, she helps to end the time travel war.

=== Minor and recurring ===
- Editrixes: Mysterious beings of unknown origin from the fourth dimension who Grand Father believes are possibly responsible for the time travel war. According to Dr. Braunstein, the Editrixes can exist in the fourth dimension while allowing part of themselves to be "observed" by 3D beings such as humans. Their goals and motives, if any, are unknown. Touching Editrixes results in one seeing flashes of their past or future.
- Doctor Qanta Braunstein: Born November 25, 2016, she is a project leader for AppleX and has a sister, Shusha. She arrives in 11,706 BCE and thus becomes the "woman who invented time travel". She accidentally crosses paths with the girls, Wari, and Jahpo, and is later injured while helping to save Jahpo from being ritualistically murdered. She is stranded in 11,706 BCE for some time and lives with Wari and Jahpo, though she is eventually rescued and brought back to 2055. She is persuaded by Wari to bring her and Jahpo to the future and they spend an unknown number of years hiding in Indonesia before later returning to the United States. She is later named as "Patient Zero" for cancer "4DC". When her health worsens, she time travels to the distant future in order to die with the rest of Earth. Upon her death, she wills her time travel machine to Wari.
- Chris: Tiffany's husband in the year 2000. The two met while both were attending Stern. Like 2000-Tiffany, he dresses in the style of the Goth subculture. He assists the girls during a battle on New Year's Eve in 1999/2000 and helps them find his wife. He then disappears, having been captured by the Restorers.
- Melissa "Missy" Tieng: Erin's younger sister and best friend. In 2016, she is a helicopter life-flight pilot and engaged. She takes the girls to the "Fourth Folding" (which leads to 11,706 BCE) via helicopter to escape the Old-Timers.
- Alice Coyle: Mac's alcoholic stepmother. When Grand Father's dinosaurs appear in 1988, Alice decides to commit suicide, believing it is a sign from God that the world is ending. She attempts to shoot herself in the head, but Mac intervenes, and in the ensuing scuffle, Erin is accidentally shot. Alice then disappears, captured by Restorers.

== Reception ==
At the review aggregator website Comic Book Roundup, the series received an average score of 8.7 out of 10 based on 173 reviews. Paper Girls won two Eisner Awards in 2016 for Best New Series and Best Penciller/Inker. It also won the Best New Series at the Harvey Awards in 2016. In 2017 Wilson (Best Colorist) and Vaughan (Best Writer) both won Eisner Awards, in part because of their work on the series. In 2017, the first compilation was shortlisted for the Hugo Award for Best Graphic Story. In 2019, Wilson again won an Eisner Award for Best Colorist for his work on the series.

The series has received widespread acclaim from reviewers. Alex Abad-Santos at Vox proclaimed that "Paper Girls is the next great American comic book". Laura Hudson from Slate stated that the series "is a reminder of how fresh and accessible even the most familiar stories and tropes can feel when people who have been consigned to the sidelines of popular entertainment take center stage". Steven Padnick from Tor noted that "the real emotional theme of Paper Girls comes to the fore: the contrast between children's fantastic hopes for adulthood and the disappointing banality of reality" and "[the series] is glorious and moving, and also awkward and funny".

The writing and artwork have been consistently praised: "Paper Girls' vivid color palette and Chiang's unique drawing style beautifully complement Vaughan's creative time-bending storyline". As David Barnett from The Guardian noted, "[Vaughan's] plotting on Paper Girls is second to none, and lays subplot trails with an artistry ... the look of Paper Girls is utterly gorgeous as well." Abad-Santos also praised the creative team, saying "Vaughan's writing and Chiang's art—along with colors from Matt Wilson and letters from Jared K. Fletcher—all make for one gorgeous mystery."

Paper Girls is often favorably compared to the Netflix hit Stranger Things. According to Barnett, fans of Stranger Things should "read this comic". Susana Polo for Polygon stated in her review of the comic series that "if you're a fan of Stranger Things but wish the show handled its female characters, or its queer coding, or its rosy-eyed love of 1980s pop culture with a little more nuance more frequently, you'll find a lot to like". While comparing Paper Girls to Stranger Things and Super 8, Glen Weldon stated that Paper Girls "tell[s] its story from the point of view of young women, not boys, and it doesn't seem coincidental that its tone is harder, flintier, funnier, more pragmatic, and far less concerned with idealizing the "lost innocence" of childhood."

== In other media ==
=== Television ===
On July 11, 2019, Deadline reported that Amazon had given a series commitment to a television adaption of Paper Girls from studios Legendary Television and Plan B. Toy Story 4 co-writer Stephany Folsom had been slated to pen the adaptation of the graphic novel. Executive producers would be series creator Vaughan, writer Folsom, and studio Plan B. On July 23, 2020, Amazon ordered the television adaptation to series. On April 26, 2021, Deadline reported that Sofia Rosinsky, Camryn Jones, Riley Lai Nelet and Fina Strazza were cast as Mac Coyle, Tiffany Quilkin, Erin Tieng and KJ Brandman respectively. On July 31, 2021, Folsom stepped down as co-showrunner of the series. Paper Girls premiered on July 29, 2022. Filming for the second season began in June 2022. In September 2022, the series was canceled after one season.

== Publication history ==
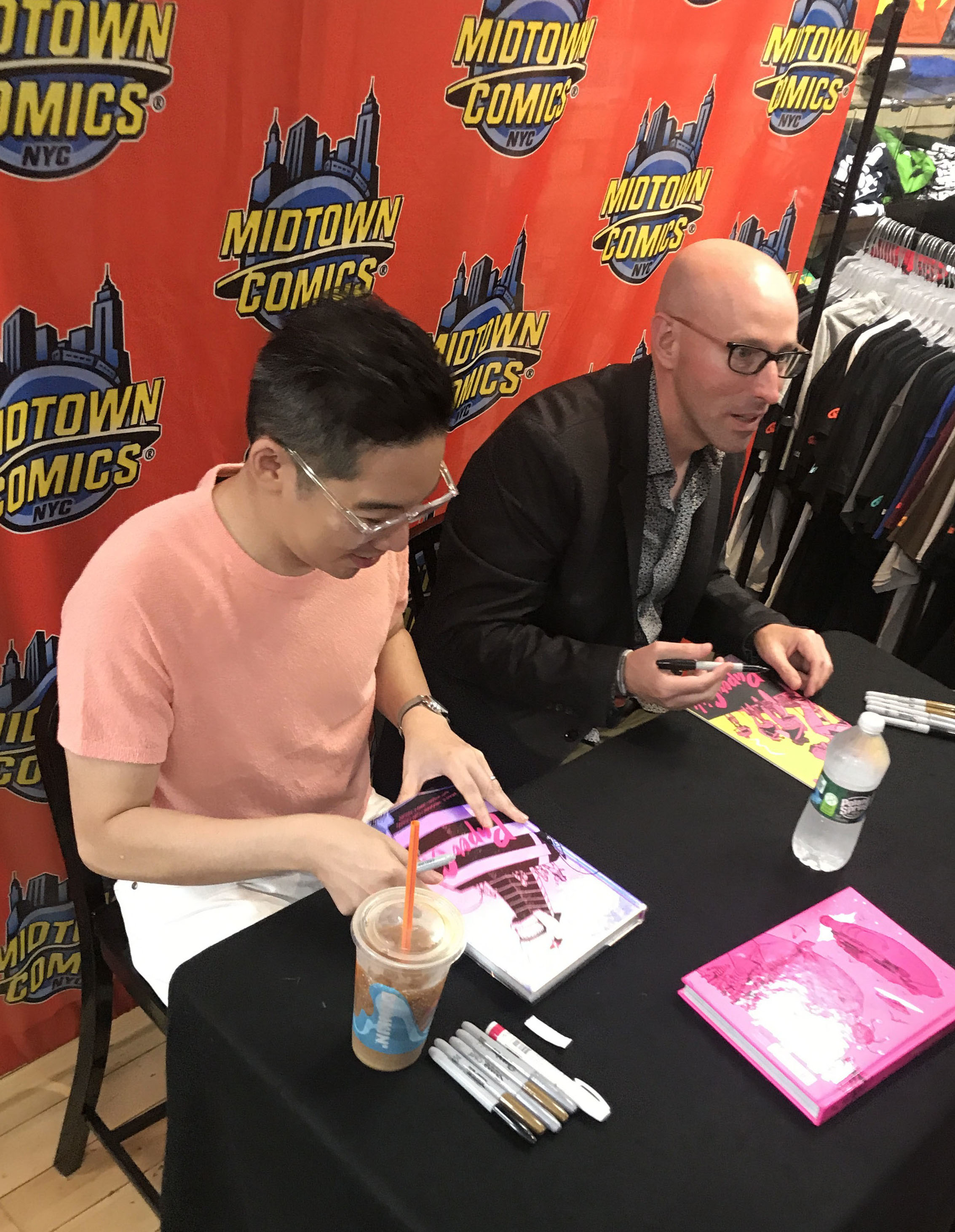
Chiang and Vaughan at an August 2019 signing for the series' final issue at Midtown Comics in Manhattan

Creator Brian K. Vaughan, talking about the creation of the series, stated that "Cliff Chiang and I wanted to do a story about kids from the 20th century confronting their adult selves in the future that's nothing like Marty McFly's world of flying cars and (actual) hoverboards, but a future that's equally amazing and terrifying for many different reasons." Vaughan elaborated in another interview:

"I wanted to do something different ... I wanted something more contained and grounded with some spectacular element to it. Paper Girls is the story of four 12-year-old newspaper delivery girls growing up, like me, in the suburbs outside Cleveland in the late 1980s. They stumble upon something extraordinary and it's a mystery and an adventure and a weird book. I didn't think it would appeal to anyone because it's too personal and offbeat."

Regarding the all-female main cast, Vaughan has said that he likes writing female characters. "I remember when I was doing Runaways at Marvel, that was a teen book that had more females than males in it ... Now being at Image, where we could do anything we want. Here's a great opportunity to do what I always wanted to do, just a group of females and not have to defend it or explain it, and just get to write them." Vaughan went on to say,

"I wanted to write a story about four kids who did not give a ... about the opposite sex. They're aware of them, but it doesn't define their lives. They're these sorts of hard-core gangsters that are much more interested in going around, shaking down the adults who owe them money so they can get their cassettes or buy their own Nintendo systems. It was avoiding the relationship traps that come up in those 1980 films ... and just letting them and their friendship be the story."

=== Bibliography ===
The series is subdivided into "arcs" of five issues each; between each group of five, the series went on pre-planned hiatuses for three months each, during which time the trade paperback collection of the preceding five issues is released. "Deluxe Edition" hardcover volumes, consisting of 10 issues each, were also released. Additionally, a compendium edition was released titled "Paper Girls: The Complete Story", collecting all 30 issues in one trade paperback.

==== Issues ====
Issue #	Publication Date
1	October 7, 2015
2	November 4, 2015
3	December 2, 2015
4	January 6, 2016
5	February 3, 2016
6	June 1, 2016
7	July 6, 2016
8	August 3, 2016
9	September 7, 2016
10	October 5, 2016
11	February 1, 2017
12	March 1, 2017
13	April 5, 2017
14	May 3, 2017
15	June 7, 2017
16	October 4, 2017
17	November 1, 2017
18	December 6, 2017
19	January 3, 2018
20	February 7, 2018
21	June 6, 2018
22	July 4, 2018
23	August 1, 2018
24	September 5, 2018
25	October 3, 2018
26	March 6, 2019
27	April 3, 2019
28	May 1, 2019
29	June 5, 2019
30	July 31, 2019

==== Collected Editions ====
Title	Contents	Pages	Release	ISBN
Trade Paperbacks
Paper Girls Vol. 1	Paper Girls #1–5	144	5 Apr 2016	978-1-63215-674-7
Paper Girls Vol. 2	Paper Girls #6–10	128	6 Dec 2016	978-1-63215-895-6
Paper Girls Vol. 3	Paper Girls #11–15	128	8 Aug 2017	978-1-5343-0223-5
Paper Girls Vol. 4	Paper Girls #16–20	128	10 Apr 2018	978-1-5343-0510-6
Paper Girls Vol. 5	Paper Girls #21–25	128	11 Dec 2018	978-1-5343-0867-1
Paper Girls Vol. 6	Paper Girls #26–30	144	1 Oct 2019	978-1-5343-1324-8
Deluxe Hardcovers
Paper Girls Book One	Paper Girls #1–10	320	14 Nov 2017	978-1-5343-0334-8
Paper Girls Book Two	Paper Girls #11–20	288	2 Apr 2019	978-1-5343-1061-2
Paper Girls Book Three	Paper Girls #21–30	320	17 Nov 2020	978-1-5343-1648-5
Compendium
Paper Girls: The Complete Story	Paper Girls #1–30	784	2 Nov 2021	978-1-5343-1999-8
