= Cliff Chiang =

American comic book artist

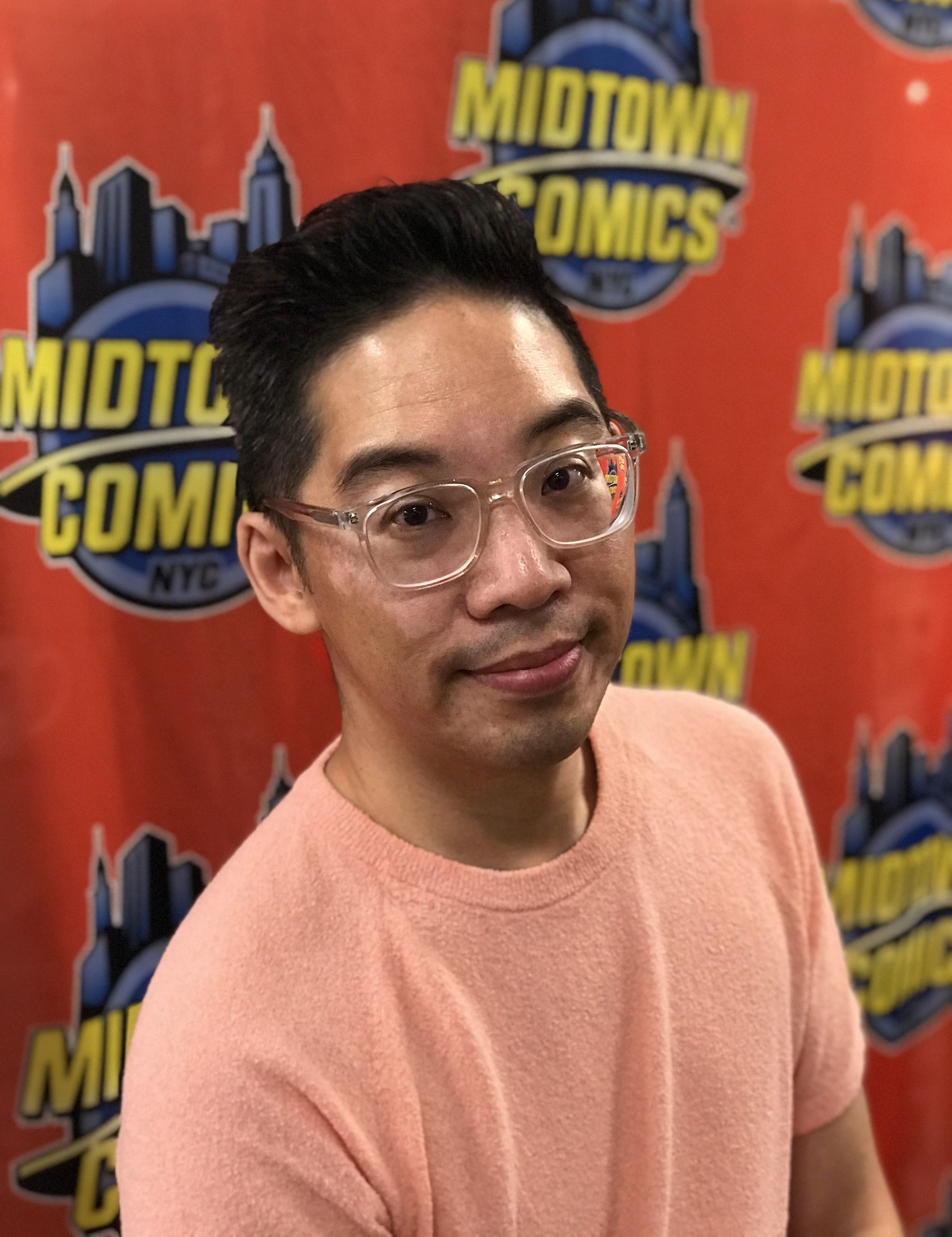
- Chiang at an August 2019 signing at Midtown Comics in Manhattan
- Born: Cliff Wu Chiang; 1974 (age 51–52)
- Area: Penciller
- Notable works: Human Target; Architecture & Mortality; Green Arrow/Black Canary; Wonder Woman; Paper Girls
- Awards: Eisner Award

Cliff Wu Chiang (born 1974) is an American comic book artist. He began his career in the industry as an assistant editor at DC Comics, before becoming an illustrator, and is known for his work on Human Target, Beware the Creeper and Crisis Aftermath: The Spectre, Green Arrow/Black Canary, Wonder Woman and Paper Girls.

== Early life ==
Chiang graduated from Harvard College, with a joint degree in English Literature and Visual Arts.

== Career ==
Chiang illustrated the series Green Arrow/Black Canary, under writer Judd Winick, from issues 1 - 7, although he continued to supply cover art until issue #15.

Chiang wrote an eight-part Dr. Thirteen back-up story, "Architecture & Mortality", in Tales of the Unexpected with writer Brian Azzarello.

In September 2011, DC Comics launched a new Wonder Woman series as part of its line-wide New 52 title relaunch, with Chiang as artist on the title, reuniting him with his previous collaborator Brian Azzarello. The first issue of the series was released in September 2011.

In July 2012, as part of San Diego Comic-Con, Chiang was one of six artists who, along with DC co-publishers Jim Lee and Dan DiDio, participated in the production of "Heroic Proportions", an episode of the Syfy reality television competition series Face Off, in which special effects artist contestants are tasked to create a new superhero, with Chiang and the other DC artists on hand to help them develop their ideas. The winning entry's character, Infernal Core by Anthony Kosar, was featured in Justice League Dark #16 (March 2013), which was published January 30, 2013. The episode premiered on January 22, 2013, as the second episode of the fourth season.

In 2015, Cliff began working on writer Brian K. Vaughan's creator-owned series for Image Comics, Paper Girls, for which Chiang won the 2016 Eisner Award for Best Penciller/Inker.

In 2021, Chiang joined the Rewriting Extinction campaign to fight the climate and biodiversity crisis through comics. He teamed up with Brian Azzarello and contributed the art and lettering to the story "Oh No" which was released in the book The Most Important Comic Book on Earth: Stories to Save the World on 28 October 2021 by DK.

== Personal life ==
Chiang lives in Brooklyn, New York City.

== Bibliography ==
=== Interior comic work ===
- The Big Book of... (anthology, Paradox Press):
  - "Little Red Cap" (with Jonathan Vankin, in The Big Book of Grimm, 1999)
  - "The Decade of Evel" (with Jonathan Vankin, in The Big Book of the 70s, 2000)
- Flinch #11: "Emergent" (with John Rozum, anthology, Vertigo, 2000)
- Vertigo Secret Files & Origins: Swamp Thing: "Bitter Fruit" (with Brian K. Vaughan, co-feature, Vertigo, 2000)
- Golden Age Secret Files: "The Dawn of the Golden Age" (with John Ostrander, co-feature, DC Comics, 2001)
- Martian Manhunter vol. 3 #35: "In My Life, Part Three" (with John Ostrander and Eduardo Barreto, DC Comics, 2001)
- Wonder Woman: Our Worlds at War: "Inspiration!" (with Phil Jimenez and Jamal Igle, one-shot, DC Comics, 2001)
- Detective Comics (DC Comics):
  - Josie Mac (with Judd Winick, co-feature):
    - "Lost Voices" (in #763-772, 2001–2002)
    - "Trading Up" (in #784, 2003)
  - "Victims" (with Shane McCarthy, in #815-816, 2006)
- Grendel: Red, White and Black #4: "Evidence of the Devil" (with Matt Wagner, anthology, Maverick, 2002)
- Batman: The Golden Streets of Gotham (with Jen Van Meter and Tommy Lee Edwards, graphic novel, DC Comics, 2003)
- Beware the Creeper #1-5 (with Jason Hall, Vertigo, 2003)
- Human Target vol. 2 #6-10, 14–16, 19-21 (with Peter Milligan, Vertigo, 2004–2005)
- Nightwing vol. 2 #111, 113 (with Devin Grayson, DC Comics, 2005)
- Crisis Aftermath: The Spectre #1-3: "Dead Again" (with Will Pfeifer, DC Comics, 2006)
- Tales of the Unexpected vol. 2 #1-8: "Dr. Thirteen" (with Brian Azzarello, co-feature, DC Comics, 2006–2007)
- Green Arrow/Black Canary #1-4, 6 (with Judd Winick, DC Comics, 2007–2008)
- Countdown to Final Crisis #4: "The Origin of Ra's Al Ghul" (with Scott Beatty, co-feature, DC Comics, 2008)
- Supergirl vol. 5 #50: "A Hero's Journey" (with Helen Slater and Jake Black, co-feature, DC Comics, 2010)
- The Brave and the Bold vol. 3 #33: "Ladies' Night" (with J. Michael Straczynski, DC Comics, 2010)
- Neil Young's Greendale (with Joshua Dysart, graphic novel, Vertigo, 2010)
- Zatanna vol. 2 #8-10 (with Paul Dini, DC Comics, 2011)
- DMZ #57: "Collective Punishment: Amina, Mother of One" (with Brian Wood, Vertigo, 2011)
- Wonder Woman vol. 4 #1-4, 7–8, 11–12, 0, 15–16, 18, 20–23, 27–29, 32-35 (with Brian Azzarello, DC Comics, 2011–2014)
- The Witching Hour: "Mars to Stay" (with Brett Lewis, anthology one-shot, Vertigo, 2013)
- Batman: Black and White vol. 2 #6: "Clay" (script and art, anthology, DC Comics, 2014)
- Thought Bubble Anthology #4: "Morning on Europa" (script and art, Image, 2014)
- Secret Origins vol. 3 #6: "The Secret Origin of Wonder Woman!" (co-scripting with Brian Azzarello, art by Goran Sudžuka, DC Comics, 2014)
- Little Nemo: Dream Another Dream: "Little Nemo in Slumberland" (script and art, anthology graphic novel, Locust Moon, 2014)
- Paper Girls #1-30 (with Brian K. Vaughan, Image, 2015–2019)
- Mine!: "Fright of the Morning Dread!" (with Brian Azzarello, anthology graphic novel, ComicMix, 2017)
- Where We Live: "Biography of a Bullet" (with Scott Bryan Wilson, anthology graphic novel, Image, 2018)
- Catwoman: "Lonely City" #1-4 (script and art, DC, 2022)

=== Covers only ===
- All-Star Comics Archives Volume 7 hc (DC Comics, 2001)
- Batgirl #38 (DC Comics, 2003)
- Batman: Gotham Knights #61-68 (DC Comics, 2005)
- Batman: Legends of the Dark Knight #190-191, 212 (DC Comics, 2005–2007)
- Gotham Central #31 (DC Comics, 2005)
- Green Arrow vol. 3 #52-53 (DC Comics, 2005)
- Red Sonja: Monster Isle #1 (Dynamite, 2006)
- Outsiders: Five of a Kind: Katana/Shazam #1 (DC Comics, 2007)
- Green Arrow/Black Canary #5, 7-14 (DC Comics, 2008–2009)
- Hawkman Companion sc (TwoMorrows, 2008)
- Secret Six vol. 3 #1-2, 30 (DC Comics, 2008–2011)
- Detective Comics #864-865 (DC Comics, 2010)
- Birds of Prey vol. 2 #1, 3 (DC Comics, 2010)
- Justice League: Generation Lost #6-13 (DC Comics, 2010–2011)
- Shazam! #1 (DC Comics, 2011)
- American Vampire: Survival of the Fittest #1 (DC Comics, 2011)
- Flashpoint: Deadman and the Flying Graysons #1-3 (DC Comics, 2011)
- Wonder Woman vol. 4 #5-6, 9–10, 13–14, 17, 19, 24–26, 30-31 (DC Comics, 2012–2014)
- Sacrifice #2 (Sam Humphries, 2012)
- The New Deadwardians #1 (Vertigo, 2012)
- Action Comics vol. 2 #12 (DC Comics, 2012)
- Before Watchmen: Minutemen #3 (DC Comics, 2012)
- The Green Team: Teen Trillionaires #1 (DC Comics, 2012)
- Superman/Wonder Woman #1, 18 (DC Comics, 2013–2015)
- Superman Unchained #3 (DC Comics, 2013)
- Batman/Superman #6 (DC Comics, 2014)
- Dead Boy Detectives #1 (DC Comics, 2014)
- Hellblazer Volume 8: Rake at the Gates of Hell tpb (Vertigo, 2014)
- Batgirl vol. 4 #33, 36, 39-40 (DC Comics, 2014–2015)
- G.I. Joe vol. 4 #1 (IDW Publishing, 2014)
- Life with Archie vol. 2 #37 (Archie Comics, 2014)
- Robin Rises: Omega #1 (DC Comics, 2014)
- Teen Titans vol. 5 #1 (DC Comics, 2014)
- Starlight #6 (Image, 2014)
- Drifter #1 (Image, 2014)
- Detective Comics vol. 2 #35, 44 (DC Comics, 2014–2015)
- The Multiversity: Thunderworld #1 (DC Comics, 2015)
- Robin Rises: Alpha #1 (DC Comics, 2015)
- Batman Eternal #48-51 (DC Comics, 2015)
- Ant-Man #3 (Marvel, 2015)
- Hellbreak #1 (Oni Press, 2015)
- Sons of the Devil #3 (Image, 2015)
- Archie vol. 2 #3 (Archie Comics, 2015)
- Ms. Marvel vol. 3 #19 (Marvel, 2015)
- Ms. Marvel vol. 4 #1-3 (Marvel, 2016)
- Spider-Gwen vol. 2 #2 (Marvel, 2016)
- Batman/Teenage Mutant Ninja Turtles #1 (DC Comics, 2016)
- The Dark Knight III: The Master Race #2 (DC Comics, 2016)
- Silver Surfer vol. 6 #1 (Marvel, 2016)
- Spider-Man/Deadpool #3 (Marvel, 2016)
- Jughead vol. 3 #6 (Archie Comics, 2016)
- Betty and Veronica vol. 3 #1 (Archie Comics, 2016)
- Star Wars: Darth Vader #25 (Marvel, 2016)
- Moonshine #6 (Image, 2017)
- Nova vol. 7 #2 (Marvel, 2017)
- America #1 (Marvel, 2017)
- Batman/The Shadow #1 (DC Comics/Dynamite, 2017)
- The Infinite Loop vol. 2 #1 (IDW Publishing, 2017)
- Southern Bastards #17 (Image, 2017)
- Dark Nights: Metal #1, 6 (DC Comics/Dynamite, 2017–2018)
- Black Magick #9 (Image, 2017)
- Gideon Falls #2 (Image, 2018)
- The Archies #7 (Archie Comics, 2018)
- The Wicked + The Divine #38 (Image, 2018)
- Asgardians of the Galaxy #1 (Marvel, 2018)
- Barbarella #10 (Dynamite, 2018)
- The Weatherman #6 (Image, 2018)
- Uncanny X-Men vol. 5 #1 (Marvel, 2019)
- Faithless #3 (Boom! Studios, 2019)
- Doctor Doom #1 (Marvel, 2019)
