= Crush (comics) =

2003 comic book

- Crush #1

Publication information
- Publisher: Dark Horse Comics
- Format: Comic book mini-series
- Publication date: 2003
- No. of issues: 4
- Main character(s): Elizabeth Mason (Crush); Mr. Vesper

Creative team
- Written by: Jason Hall
- Artist: Sean Murphy

Crush is a four-issue comic book mini-series created in 2003 by Jason Hall (writer) and Sean Murphy (artist), and published by Dark Horse Comics.

== Summary ==
Elizabeth Mason is a girl in a dysfunctional family who unwittingly changes into a monster named Crush whenever she bleeds. In her alternate form, Elizabeth seeks revenge against anyone who makes her daily life miserable. To make matters worse, the masked Mr. Vesper sends his minions to try to capture her. Along with her friends, Elizabeth makes an effort to figure out the mystery of her past and the identity of her true family.

== Collected editions ==
A collection of all four issues was published on August 25, 2004.
