= Beware the Creeper =

DC comic book series

- Beware the Creeper #1, art by Steve Ditko.

Publication information
- Publisher: DC Comics; Vertigo Comics
- Schedule: Vol. 1: Bi-monthly; Vol. 2: Monthly
- Format: All; Standard U.S., 4 color. When published, ongoing.
- Genre: Superhero
- Publication date: Vol. 1: April 1968 – February 1969; Vol. 2: April – August 2003
- No. of issues: Vol. 1: 6 Vol. 2: 5
- Main character: Creeper

Creative team
- Written by: Vol. 1: Dennis O'Neil; Steve Ditko (#1); Vol. 2: Jason Hall
- Artist(s): Vol. 1: Steve Ditko; Jack Sparling (#6); Vol. 2: Cliff Chiang
- Penciller(s): Vol. 1: Steve Ditko (#1–4); Jack Sparling (#5–6); Vol. 2: Cliff Chiang
- Inker(s): Vol. 1: Steve Ditko (#1–4); Mike Peppe (#5–6); Vol. 2: Cliff Chiang
- Letterer(s): Vol. 2: John Workman
- Colorist(s): Vol. 2: Dave Stewart

Beware the Creeper is the name of two comic book series published by DC Comics. The first series debuted in 1968 and starred the Creeper. This series was cancelled after six issues. The second was a five-issue limited series published in 2003 by DC under their Vertigo imprint.

== 1968 series ==
Beware the Creeper began in the March/April dated, Showcase #73 in 1968, in a story plotted and drawn by Steve Ditko, with Don Segall assisting with the dialog. DC's policy at the time was to give a character a single appearance in Showcase as an introduction before launching their series. Two months later, the first issue of Beware the Creeper was released with a cover date of June 1968. Beware the Creeper was cancelled after six issues, the victim, per columnist and artist Fred Hembeck, of "bean-counters [who] were a little quick to yank the rug out from underneath a new series during that particular stage of DC's history...." The storyline started in the six issues of Beware the Creeper would eventually be concluded seven years later in Super-Team Family #2, published in 1975.

=== Creators ===
- Denny O'Neil - writer
- Steve Ditko - penciller and inker (co-writer issue #1)
- Mike Peppe - inker (issues #5 and #6)
- Jack Sparling - penciller (pages #12-24 of issue #6)

== 2003 series ==
Beware the Creeper #1, art by Cliff Chiang.

With no obvious connection to the original series (though with subtle ties to DC Universe continuity), DC released Beware the Creeper, a five issue limited series, under their Vertigo imprint in 2003. Set in 1925 Paris, Beware the Creeper tells the story of Judith and Madeline Benoir, twin sisters, one a surrealist painter, the other a playwright. After Judith is beaten by Mathieu Arbogast, a man from a rich upper-class family, a woman calling herself the Creeper begins to terrorize the Arbogast family. The Creeper uses methods that appear to be based out of the surrealist movement. The situation quickly spirals out of control as the Arbogasts begin to seek revenge in turn, and lives are eventually lost. There is also a major sub-plot involving Ric Allain, the inspector in charge of the Creeper investigation. He is in love with Judith based on letters sent to him while he was fighting in the Great War. Unbeknownst to him, Madeline wrote the letters but was too shy to sign them, instead having Judith sign them for her.

=== Creators ===
- Jason Hall - writer
- Cliff Chiang - penciller and inker
- Dave Stewart - colourist
- John Workman - letterer
