= The Great Wave (The Lord of the Rings: The Rings of Power) =

- The Lord of the Rings: The Rings of Power episode
- Cover art for the episode's soundtrack album
- Episode no.: Season 1 Episode 4
- Directed by: Wayne Che Yip
- Written by: Stephany Folsom; J. D. Payne; Patrick McKay
- Cinematography by: Aaron Morton
- Editing by: Stefan Grube; Cheryl Potter
- Original release date: September 16, 2022
- Running time: 71 minutes

Additional cast
- Anthony Crum as Ontamo; Alex Tarrant as Valandil; Joseph Mawle as Adar; Peter Tait as Tredwill; Geoff Morrell as Waldreg; Ian Blackburn as Rowan; Ken Blackburn as Tar-Palantir; Peter Mullan as Durin III; Laura Medes as young mother; Carmel McGlone as Edda; Jason Hood as Tamar; Adam Faiz as guild merchant; Antonio Te Maioha as the sail master; Phil Grieve as Bazur; Luke Hawker as Magrot; Jed Brophy as Vrath; Edward Clendon as Grugzûk

Episode chronology
← Previous "Adar"	Next → "Partings"
- The Lord of the Rings: The Rings of Power season 1

"The Great Wave" is the fourth episode of the first season of the American fantasy television series The Lord of the Rings: The Rings of Power, which is based on J. R. R. Tolkien's history of Middle-earth. It was written by Stephany Folsom and showrunners J. D. Payne and Patrick McKay, and directed by Wayne Che Yip.

The series is set thousands of years before Tolkien's novel The Lord of the Rings (1954–55), during the Second Age of Middle-earth. This episode uses a palantír seeing stone to show the future destruction of the island kingdom of Númenor, allowing all audience members to know its tragic fate. It also introduces Adar (Joseph Mawle), an Elf who was transformed into one of the first Orcs. Sophia Nomvete provided the vocals for her character, Disa, who sings "A Plea to the Rocks" in the episode. Filming for the first season took place in New Zealand, and work on episodes beyond the first two began in January 2021. Production wrapped for the season in August 2021.

"The Great Wave" premiered on the streaming service Amazon Prime Video on September 16, 2022. It was estimated to have high viewership and received generally positive reviews.

== Background ==
The Lord of the Rings: The Rings of Power is based on J. R. R. Tolkien's history of Middle-earth. It is set thousands of years before his novels The Hobbit (1937) and The Lord of the Rings (1954–55). While it is contractually not a continuation of Peter Jackson's The Lord of the Rings (2001–2003) and The Hobbit (2012–2014) film trilogies, it is intended to be visually consistent with them, and the first season was produced in New Zealand like Jackson's films were. J. D. Payne and Patrick McKay were hired to develop the series and serve as its showrunners, with Wayne Che Yip set to direct four episodes of the first season.

The series covers the major events of Middle-earth's Second Age. Amazon did not acquire the rights to Tolkien's main Second Age writings, so the writers identified references to the period in The Hobbit, The Lord of the Rings, and the latter's appendices, and created a story that bridges those passages. The Second Age begins after the defeat of the "Dark Lord" Morgoth, when his army of Orcs are scattered and his lieutenant Sauron is in hiding. The large cast of characters includes Elves, Dwarves, Men, and Harfoots, the last being precursors to the diminutive Hobbits from The Hobbit and The Lord of the Rings.

== Plot ==
Queen Regent Míriel has a vision of Númenor being destroyed by a giant tsunami. The Elf Galadriel and Númenórean captain Elendil believe Sauron's forces are attacking the Southlands in Middle-earth, but Míriel refuses to intervene. When Galadriel demands to speak with her father, King Tar-Palantir, Míriel has her imprisoned. Elendil's son Isildur gets distracted during his naval cadet training, leading to him and his friends Valandil and Ontamo being dismissed from service.

Captured Elf Arondir meets Adar, the Elf-like leader of the Orcs, who sends Arondir back to the Southlanders with a message: swear fealty to Adar or be killed. Young Southlander Theo attempts to recover food from the Tirharad tavern and is attacked by Orcs. Arondir rescues Theo and they reunite with the other Southlanders at the tower of Ostirith. Tavern owner Waldreg reveals to Theo that he is a follower of Sauron and states that the broken sword Theo secretly carries is a gift from Sauron.

At the Elven realm of Eregion, Elves and Dwarves are building Celebrimbor's new forge. Celebrimbor believes Prince Durin IV is hiding something, and Elrond learns that Durin IV has been mining a powerful new ore. Elrond promises to keep this secret and names it "mithril". When the mine collapses, King Durin III shuts down further mithril mining. Durin IV is angered, but reconciles with his father and agrees to learn about the Elves' plans.

On the suggestion of her human companion Halbrand, Galadriel escapes prison and sneaks into Tar-Palantir's tower. She finds the king in ill health, protected by Míriel. The latter says there was a rebellion because the king wanted to renew relations with the Elves, and Míriel was placed on the throne in his stead. This gave her access to a palantír seeing stone which showed her the vision of Númenor's downfall. She shows this vision to Galadriel and explains her belief that helping Galadriel will bring upon this cataclysmic future. As she has Galadriel escorted back to Middle-earth, the petals of Númenor's White Tree fall. Míriel says this signifies the tears of the Valar and changes her mind. She announces that she will take an expeditionary force with Galadriel to assist the Men of the Southlands. Isildur, Valandil, and Ontamo volunteer to join the force.

== Production ==
=== Writing ===
"The Great Wave" was written by Stephany Folsom, Payne, and McKay. They wanted to establish a working relationship between Míriel and her cousin, Chancellor Pharazôn, in anticipation of Pharazôn turning on Míriel in future seasons. The episode also shows that Míriel has been having visions of Númenor's destruction in a great tsunami after looking into a crystal ball-like palantír. The showrunners said there was ambiguity about the abilities of the palantíri in Tolkien's works. They are primarily used to communicate across great distances, but there are also indications that they can be used to communicate across time. The palantíri can also be misused and mislead the user. The showrunners wanted to explore all of that and knew that there are seven palantíri present in Númenor during the series' events. Using the palantír to show a vision of Numenor's destruction allowed them to lean into the fact that Númenor is doomed, with Tolkien giving it a similar fate to Atlantis. By letting the audience know that, they could tell that story in a similar way to the film Titanic (1997) in which the viewer is aware of the tragic end that is coming and they can watch as the characters' choices move them away from or towards that tragedy. This is especially seen in Míriel, who takes steps to prevent the destruction of Númenor but potentially helps bring about that fate through her actions. They compared elements of Míriel to Cassandra from Greek mythology. Míriel star Cynthia Addai-Robinson said there was an earlier version of the script where a set of stones falling over was a key sign for Míriel at the end of the episode, before the final version of the script which uses the leaves of the White Tree of Númenor as a sign instead.

Discussing Isildur's story in the episode, star Maxim Baldry explained that he has grown up in Númenor not fitting in, unlike his friends Valandil and Ontamo, and Isildur is looking for "something more to life". He added that the character is conflicted by these feelings because he also wants to remain with his family. After the season finished, the showrunners gave Isildur's storyline as an example of elements from the first season that were "small" and did not meet audience expectations for a The Lord of the Rings story. For future seasons they wanted to ensure that all the story beats were tied to more "existential" ideas.

Adar was inspired by one of Tolkien's explanations for where Orcs come from, in which Elves were corrupted by dark forces into the first Orcs. The showrunners felt that was a compelling idea that could be revealed as part of Adar's backstory. Further exploring Orc culture was one of the reasons the showrunners wanted to make the series, and they wanted to explore the idea that the Orcs are not inherently evil considering Tolkien's view that nothing in his world was evil in the beginning. However, they did not want to introduce "good" Orcs and believed they should continue to be portrayed as "pretty horrible". The idea that the Orcs are fighting for what they think is right was inspired by Claude Rains's antagonist Alexander Sebastian in Alfred Hitchcock's film Notorious (1946). The showrunners felt Adar's care for the Orcs as his "children" would be relatable to the audience.

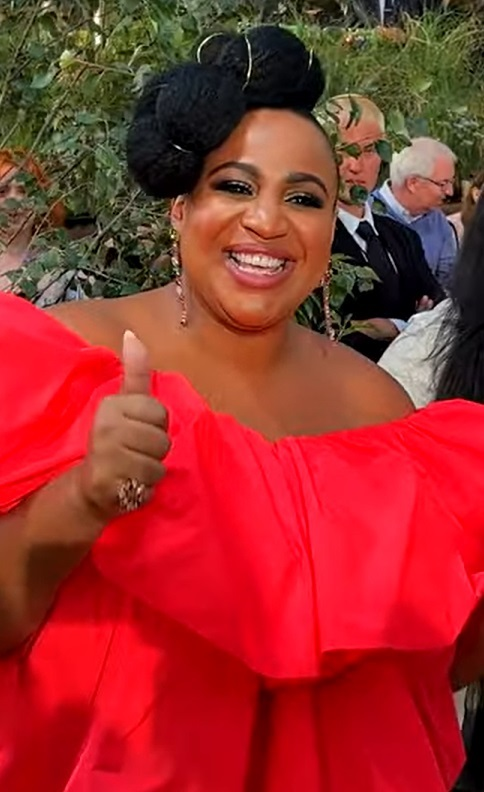
Sophia Nomvete's character Disa sings "A Pleas to the Rocks"

The showrunners wanted to give the Dwarf princess Disa an element that set her apart from the male Dwarves that had been seen in previous Tolkien adaptations, and developed the idea of her magical ability to resonate stone with her voice. They described her role in Dwarvish society as combining elements of an artist and a priestess. The showrunners thought this aligned with the established culture and society of the Dwarves, and was a believable extension of the echolocation that real-life cave-dwelling creatures have developed.

Disa actress Sophia Nomvete felt there was a pain at the center of her character's husband, Prince Durin IV, that was created by the absence of his friend Elrond in the years before the start of the series. Nomvete said Disa was aware of this and wanted to help him overcome it. In researching Dwarvish culture for the series, Nomvete read about Aulë, the creator of the Dwarves, and felt the dynamic between him and his wife Yavanna was reflected in the relationship between Disa and Durin. Durin actor Owain Arthur saw the scene between Prince Durin and King Durin III as a coming-of-age moment for the prince where he has to decide between his personal wishes and the expectations of his father. For the preceding scene, where Durin and Elrond discuss their respective fathers, Arthur and Elrond star Robert Aramayo discussed their own relationships with their fathers as preparation. This storyline introduces the powerful ore mithril to the series. Yip felt this introduction would register for audiences who were not familiar with Tolkien's lore because of the time that had been invested in the relationship between Durin and Elrond so far in the series: "You don't need to necessarily understand exactly what Durin is talking about regarding the mithril, but you can see how much it means to him".

=== Casting ===
The season's cast includes Cynthia Addai-Robinson as Míriel, Robert Aramayo as Elrond, Owain Arthur as Durin IV, Maxim Baldry as Isildur, Nazanin Boniadi as Bronwyn, Morfydd Clark as Galadriel, Ismael Cruz Córdova as Arondir, Charles Edwards as Celebrimbor, Trystan Gravelle as Pharazôn, Ema Horvath as Eärien, Tyroe Muhafidin as Theo, Sophia Nomvete as Disa, Lloyd Owen as Elendil, Charlie Vickers as Halbrand, and Leon Wadham as Kemen. Also starring in the episode are Anthony Crum as Ontamo, Alex Tarrant as Valandil, Peter Tait as Tredwill, Geoff Morrell as Waldreg, Ian Blackburn as Rowan, Ken Blackburn as Tar-Palantir, Peter Mullan as Durin III, Laura Medes as young mother, Carmel McGlone as Edda, Jason Hood as Tamar, Adam Faiz as guild merchant, Antonio Te Maioha as the sail master, Phil Grieve as Bazur, Luke Hawker as Magrot, Jed Brophy as Vrath, and Edward Clendon as Grugzûk. Robert Strange plays an unnamed Orc in the episode.

=== Design ===
Wētā Workshop created props, weapons, and prosthetics for the season, and prosthetics supervisor Jamie Wilson said Adar was their biggest design challenge. The design went through many iterations to determine where he should fall between an Elf and an Orc, before settling on a look that is closer to an Elf, with Elvish prosthetic ears along with scars and a "septic, slightly eerie" skin tone created with makeup. Mithril was created with a translucent material in a shape that mixes organic and faceted surfaces. This was gilded with gun bluing and augmented by the visual effects team for close-up shots. In the Númenórean king's tower where the palantír is kept, other artifacts from the First Age can also be seen in the background: Dramborleg, the axe wielded by Tuor against a group of Balrogs; the shield of Tuor which features a swan wings design; the sword Aranrúth which is wielded by the rulers of Númenor; and the sword Narsil, which is eventually passed to Elendil and his descendants, with a similar design to its appearance in Jackson's films.

=== Filming ===
Production on episodes beyond the first two began in January 2021, under the working title Untitled Amazon Project or simply UAP, following an extended filming break that began due to the COVID-19 pandemic. Yip directed the episode, and confirmed that he had begun filming his episodes by March. Aaron Morton was the cinematographer for Yip's episodes. Yip felt the audience would expect Adar to be a monstrous figure and played into that with the character's introduction by focusing on his spiky glove and scars, before subverting expectations by revealing that he is Elf-like. For the scene where Pharazôn addresses a crowd of Númenóreans, there were 200 to 250 extras on set. Gravelle said Yip "whipped them up into a frenzy" over a microphone, preparing the crowd for Gravelle's performance. Filming for the season wrapped on August 2.

=== Visual effects ===
Visual effects for the episode were created by Industrial Light & Magic (ILM), Wētā FX, Method Studios, Rodeo FX, DNEG, Cause and FX, Atomic Arts, and Cantina Creative. The different vendors were overseen by visual effects supervisor Jason Smith. The palantír effect was created by Rodeo, based on a design suggestion by Smith. He believed that the visions shown by the palantír create "a little bit of strife, a little bit of division" which led to the idea that the crystal and its surrounding environment would fracture to reveal a vision. He explained that, from the perspective of the unseen world, the area around the crystal is also made of crystal and so the cracking indicates that something from the unseen world is being revealed. Rodeo described this as linking two scenes with a broken glass effect. Yip acknowledged that this is different from the way that the palantíri work in Jackson's films and explained that "this was a completely different palantír that did different things". He compared the fracturing effect to rocks and gemstones and felt it was organic in addition to magical.

=== Music ===
==== "A Plea to the Rocks" ====
For the scene where Disa sings to the mountain, Nomvete worked to find a tone of voice that sounded like it could be resonating stone. She explained that she had been taught to "clean up the natural rasp in her voice" during musical theater training and always felt that held her back, "because I always thought that my voice somehow wasn't perfect. And so this moment felt like an expression of what I had as a vocalist. It just felt like a freedom cry for my voice." Nomvete saw a metaphor in the song of using your own voice and power. She said the song was one of the highlights of her career due to being able to collaborate on composing it in addition to performing it. The producers did not want any of the other actors to hear the music until it was sung on set, so they could be filmed hearing it for the first time.

This scene was one of composer Bear McCreary's favorites from the episode, along with the preceding slow motion action sequence featuring Arondir and Theo. He composed a choral piece in Quenya, one of Tolkien's constructed languages for the Elves, which is heard during the Arondir and Theo scene and transitions to Nomvete's on-set vocals for the Disa scene. McCreary added deep vocals singing in Khuzdul, Tolkien's constructed Dwarvish language, to accompany Nomvete's performance, and had her re-record the song in a studio so he could adjust the ending. Sound designer Robby Stambler added a resonating effect to Nomvete's vocals for the song's climax.

==== Episode score ====
This is the first episode of the series that McCreary did not introduce any new themes for, instead using the themes established in the previous episodes. For example, his themes for Númenor and the "Faithful" Númenóreans, like Elendil, are heard throughout the episode. The final scenes feature McCreary's wife and frequent collaborator Raya Yarbrough, in her first contribution to the series, singing Galadriel's theme as that character prepares to leave Númenor. This transitions to McCreary's theme for the Faithful Númenóreans as the leaves of the White Tree fall, before ending on a "triumphant and rousing" version of the Númenor theme as the Númenóreans agree to accompany Galadriel to Middle-earth. The scenes featuring mithril use a chord progression from "Where the Shadows Lie", the theme that represents the Rings of Power and related elements in the series.

The Lord of the Rings: The Rings of Power (Season One, Episode Four: The Great Wave – Amazon Original Series Soundtrack)

Film score by Bear McCreary
- Released: September 15, 2022
- Genres: Orchestra; choir; world
- Length: 54:53
- Languages: English; Constructed languages
- Labels: Amazon; Mondo

Bear McCreary chronology
Adar (2022)	The Great Wave (2022)	Partings (2022)

A soundtrack album featuring McCreary's score for the episode was released digitally on the streaming service Amazon Music on September 15, 2022. McCreary said the album contained "virtually every second of score" from the episode. It was added to other music streaming services after the full first season was released. A CD featuring the episode's music is included in a limited edition box set collection for the season from Mondo, Amazon Music, and McCreary's label Sparks & Shadows. The box set was released on April 26, 2024, and includes a journal written by McCreary which details the creation of the episode's score. All music was composed by Bear McCreary:

Track listing
No.	Title	Length
1.	"Civil Unrest in the Island Kingdom"	9:35
2.	"Adar Lord-father"	4:26
3.	"A New Ore"	8:41
4.	"The King in the Tower"	7:50
5.	"Theo in the Shadows"	6:43
6.	"A Plea to the Rocks" (featuring Sophia Nomvete)	3:47
7.	"Father Figures"	8:36
8.	"White Leaves"	5:15
Total length:		54:53

== Release ==
"The Great Wave" premiered on the streaming service Amazon Prime Video on September 16, 2022. It was released at the same time around the world, in more than 240 countries and territories. For two weeks leading up to the second season's premiere on August 29, 2024, the first season was made available for free on the streaming service Samsung TV Plus in the US, Canada, Brazil, the United Kingdom, and Germany.

Ahead of the third season's release in November 2026, a home media release for the first two seasons was announced. Each release features the eight episodes of the respective season along with behind-the-scenes content. They were released on 4K Ultra HD, Blu-ray, and DVD on November 3, and in limited edition 4K UHD SteelBook—with Amazon exclusive collectable art cards—on December 1.

== Reception ==
=== Viewership ===
Whip Media, which tracks viewership data for the 21 million worldwide users of its TV Time app, calculated that for the week ending September 18, two days after the episode's debut, The Rings of Power was the third-highest original streaming series for US viewership behind Netflix's Cobra Kai and Disney+'s She-Hulk: Attorney at Law. JustWatch, a guide to streaming content with access to data from more than 20 million users around the world, placed the series sixth on its list of top 10 streaming series in the US for the week ending September 18. Nielsen Media Research, which records streaming viewership on US television screens, estimated that the series was watched for 988 million minutes during the week ending September 18. This was a drop from the previous two weeks, but the series moved up to second-place on the company's list of top streaming series and films, behind only Cobra Kai. Parrot Analytics determines audience "demand expressions" based on various data sources, including social media activity and comments on rating platforms. During the week ending September 23, the company calculated that The Rings of Power was 27.2 times more in demand than the average US streaming series, placing it tenth on the company's top 10 list for the week.

=== Critical response ===
On review aggregator Rotten Tomatoes, 84% of 32 critics gave the episode a positive review and the average of rated reviews was 6.7 out of 10. The critics consensus reads, "'The Great Wave' is an awkwardly sluggish mid-point for a season still searching for momentum, but the slow pacing doesn't wash away glittering virtues like awe-inspiring visuals and impressively detailed world-building."

== Companion media ==
An episode of the official aftershow Deadline's Inside the Ring: LOTR: The Rings of Power for "The Great Wave" was released on September 17, 2022. Hosted by Deadline Hollywood's Dominic Patten and Anthony D'Alessandro, it features exclusive "footage and insights" for the episode, plus interviews with cast members Córdova, Boniadi, Addai-Robinson, Gravelle, Muhafidin, and Baldry, as well as Yip, Doble, and dialect coach Leith McPherson. On October 14, The Official The Lord of the Rings: The Rings of Power Podcast was released on Amazon Music. Hosted by actress Felicia Day, the fourth episode is dedicated to "The Great Wave" and features Arthur, Nomvete, Payne, and McKay. On November 21, a bonus segment featuring behind-the-scenes footage from the episode was added to Prime Video's X-Ray feature as part of a series titled "The Making of The Rings of Power".
