= Stephany Folsom =

American screenwriter

- Born: Colorado Springs, Colorado, U.S.
- Education: Loyola Marymount University
- Occupations: Screenwriter; producer
- Writing career
- Years active: 2013–present

Stephany Folsom is a screenwriter, best known for her work on Toy Story 4 (2019) and Paper Girls.

== Early life ==
Folsom was raised in Colorado Springs, Colorado. While growing up, Folsom developed an appreciation for films: "I'd frequently visit the local movie theaters or DVD rental store, watching new and old movies as much as possible, studying the various crafts, genres and history." She told her high school counselor that she wanted to enroll in film school, but was advised instead to study radio. Folsom did not follow that advice, and after her high school graduation, she moved to Los Angeles, California. There, she enrolled in film school at Loyola Marymount University. After her graduation from Loyola, Folsom worked in feature film development, which she provided script coverage and notes.

Folsom left the position to focus on her personal writing, but soon left Los Angeles to assist a friend in filming a documentary short to support an AIDS clinic in India. Complications arose, in which Folsom later explained, "The clinic was never going to be built. It was near the Golden Triangle so there were all kinds of problems with drug trafficking. I didn't know any of this was going on there before I went ... We ended up being in lockdown and under curfew." The project was never completed; nevertheless, Folsom later worked with various foundations to produce documentary shorts about human trafficking and AIDS. Meanwhile, she wrote for the YouTube series Ds2dio 360, while writing feature-length spec scripts. After a few years, Folsom recalled she felt "completely burnt out on the travel and tough subject matter."

== Career ==
Back in the United States, Folsom attended a NASA Social event and later toured a Stanley Kubrick exhibit at the Los Angeles County Museum of Art. There, she was reminded of the conspiracy theory that Stanley Kubrick had faked the Apollo 11 Moon landing. Inspired by the idea, she began writing 1969: A Space Odyssey in January 2013. That same year, her script was listed at number 56 on the 2013 Hit List, Launchpad's list of the best spec scripts of the year. It was also listed on the 2013 Black List. A year later, 1969: A Space Odyssey was given a live reading at the first Black List Live! event as part of the LA Film Festival. The reading featured Jared Harris as Stanley Kubrick and Kathryn Hahn as Barbara, a NASA employee.

In May 2015, Folsom was hired to write The Princess of North Sudan for Walt Disney Pictures. The project was based on the real-life story of Jeremiah Heaton, a man who claimed a piece of land between Egypt and Sudan to make his daughter a princess. The project received immediate criticism from users on Twitter who claimed the project evoked colonization and "literal white entitlement." Folsom defended the project by responding, "There is no planting a flag in Sudan or making a white girl the princess of an African country. That's gross."

In December 2015, Folsom was hired to polish the script for Thor: Ragnarok (2017). Before the film's release, she was denied a writing credit by the Writers Guild of America (WGA). Folsom publicly lambasted the decision on Twitter, writing "Marvel gave me 'story by' credit on THOR RAGNAROK and the writers' guild denied me the credit due to guild regulations ... There's something very wrong when a major corporation is doing more to protect your interests than your own guild." Folsom was later hired to write two episodes ("The High Tower" and "Secrets and Holograms") for Star Wars Resistance. Folsom was the first female writer to work on the series.

In January 2018, Folsom was hired to write a new screenplay for Toy Story 4 (2019) with Andrew Stanton. The screenplay was a finalist for the 45th annual Humanitas Prize in the Family Feature Film Category. In November 2018, it was announced that Folsom would write the screenplay for This is Jane, a film adaptation of The Story of Jane: The Legendary Underground Feminist Abortion Service by Laura Kaplan. The project was set to star Michelle Williams.

In July 2019, Folsom was hired as the head writer and executive producer for the television adaptation of Brian K. Vaughan's comic book series, Paper Girls produced by Amazon Studios. That same month, Folsom was hired as a consulting producer on Amazon Studios' The Lord of the Rings: The Rings of Power, for which she served as an episode writer. By July 2021, Folsom officially departed her position as co-showrunner for Paper Girls.

In August 2022, Folsom was hired to write an upcoming television adaptation of King Kong for Disney+.

== Personal life ==
Folsom lives in Altadena, California.

== Filmography ==
=== Film ===
Year	Title	Credit	Notes
2013	1969: A Space Odyssey, or How Kubrick learned to Stop Worrying and Land on the Moon	Written by	Unproduced
2017	Thor: Ragnarok	Story by	Due to WGA regulations, Folsom was denied a writing credit.
2019	Toy Story 4	Story by / Screenplay by	Story co-written with John Lasseter, Andrew Stanton, Josh Cooley, Valerie LaPointe, Rashida Jones, Will McCormack and Martin Hynes; Screenplay co-written with Andrew Stanton

=== Television ===
Year	Title	Credit	Notes
2018	Star Wars Resistance	Writer	Episodes: "The High Tower" and "Secrets and Holograms"
2022	The Lord of the Rings: The Rings of Power	Writer / Consulting producer	Episode: "The Great Wave"
2022	Paper Girls	Showrunner / Writer / Executive producer	Folsom left her position in July 2021

== Awards and nominations ==
Year	Film	Nomination/Win	Award	Category	Notes
2020	Toy Story 4	Nomination	Humanitas Prize	Family Feature Film	
