= Smart Power =

Book written by Christian Whiton

Smart Power: Between Diplomacy and War
- First edition cover of Smart Power: Between Diplomacy and War
- Author: Christian Whiton
- Language: English
- Subject: Diplomacy, Statecraft, Politics, U.S. history
- Genre: Non-fiction
- Published: 2013 (Potomac Books)
- Publication place: United States
- Media type: Print
- Pages: 304
- ISBN: 978-1-612-34619-9
- Dewey Decimal: 327.7300905
- LC Class: E902 .W495 2013

Smart Power: Between Diplomacy and War is a 2013 book written by Christian Whiton with a foreword by Paula Dobriansky. Both were diplomats in the George W. Bush administration.

The book is Whiton's attempt to articulate a realistic defense strategy for major contemporary threats to U.S. national security, with an emphasis on using smart power, which he defines as "the neglected tools of statecraft that lie between diplomacy and outright war." Whiton includes personal accounts from the Bush administration and critiques of foreign policy in the Obama administration to illustrate what he believes to be a lack of U.S. smart power acumen. Whiton also draws heavily from the Cold War and other points in history to illustrate successful smart power. He adapts these tools to current threats, which he argues are primarily composed of Iran, China, and Islamism. Whiton also addresses the politics of national security, critiquing prominent figures on both the political left and the right.

One reviewer summarized, "He defines the essence of 'smart power' as 'peacefully shaping political outcomes in foreign countries,' a skill no recent presidency has mastered."

== Reviews ==
Lewis Lehrman, a Reagan administration official, favorably reviewed Smart Power, writing, "This book should be read by every unselfconscious, unapologetic patriot, whether conservative or liberal. Libertarians, too, will find the analysis useful to their purposes. And it should be on the reading list of every potential candidate who aspires to replace the incumbent president." However, Lehrman criticized "Whiton's derisive treatment of Ron Paul."

Writing for the Claremont Review of Books, John R. Bolton, a former U.S. ambassador to the United Nations, questioned Whiton's focus on reform of the national security apparatus: "Readers can agree or disagree with Christian Whiton's recommendations for reform. My own view is that the problems are more cultural than structural, and that something more than a simple rearrangement of the bureaucracy is required." However, Bolton wrote favorably that, "His policy critiques are worthwhile, but what really shines is his version of Gulliver's Travels through the national security bureaucracy. His journey is of course unique, but it reflects larger patterns and failures within the State Department and beyond."

Elliott Abrams, who was a deputy national security advisor in the George W. Bush administration, was critical of what he called Whiton's "habit of attacking potential allies—for example, neoconservatives—and Whiton writes of 'neoconservatives on the right and moralists on the left [who] call for intervention at the drop of a hat' and 'whose sole solution to foreign problems so often seems to be sideshow wars.'" However, Abrams also wrote that "it is not Whiton's specific proposals that make this a valuable book; it is his analyses of today's foreign policy challenges and our bureaucratic failings in meeting them. His portrait of the Foreign Service is etched in acid, and his description of the jumble of agencies and offices supposedly handling political warfare when they oppose even the idea that we should engage in this type of combat is effective and therefore depressing. But he seems a happy warrior himself, confident that the next Harry Truman or Ronald Reagan is out there and that "American voters will find them eventually.'"

In the Huffington Post, James Farwell summarized, "Whiton is a member of what I call the hard-nosed school of realism. He advocates the use of kinetic means if essential, but mostly he favors a tough-minded approach that challenges those who oppose the U.S. through savvy peaceful means that achieve well-defined political objectives -- what the military thinks of as 'end-states'—while avoiding unnecessary bloodshed." However, Farwell disagreed with some of Whiton's conclusions, including over non-intervention in Rwanda to stop genocide in the mid-1990s.

== List of chapters ==
1. The False Choice: Diplomacy or War
2. Arab-Persian Spring: How Not to Use Smart Power
3. Failed Politics of National Defense
4. Smart Power with Chinese Characteristics
5. Islamist Political Warfare
6. Five Deadly Illusions
7. Washington's Broken Institutions
8. Organizing for Victory
9. Undermining Iran and Islamists
10. Making Life Harder for Beijing
11. Leading America's Pacific Century
12. Spreading The Song of Masters

== See also ==
- Power (international relations)
- Smart power
- Soft power
- Foreign policy of the George W. Bush administration
- Foreign policy of the Barack Obama administration
- History of U.S. foreign policy

== Related books ==
- Presidential Command: Power, Leadership, and the Making of Foreign Policy from Richard Nixon to George W. Bush (2009), by Peter Rodman
- The China Fantasy: How Our Leaders Explain Away Chinese Repression (2007), by James Mann
- The Craft of Intelligence (1963), by Allen Dulles
