= The Other Side of the Door (2016 film) =

2016 film by Johannes Roberts

- Theatrical release poster
- Directed by: Johannes Roberts
- Written by: Ernest Riera; Johannes Roberts
- Produced by: Alexandre Aja; Rory Aitken; Ben Pugh
- Starring: Sarah Wayne Callies; Jeremy Sisto
- Cinematography: Maxime Alexandre
- Edited by: Baxter
- Music by: Joseph Bishara
- Production companies: 42; Fire Axe Pictures
- Distributed by: 20th Century Fox
- Release date: March 4, 2016
- Running time: 95 minutes
- Countries: United Kingdom; India
- Language: English
- Budget: $5 million
- Box office: $14.3 million

The Other Side of the Door is a 2016 supernatural horror film directed by Johannes Roberts, and co-written by Roberts and Ernest Riera. Starring Sarah Wayne Callies, Jeremy Sisto, Javier Botet, and Sofia Rosinsky, the film was co-production between the United Kingdom and India and was released in the United Kingdom and the United States on 4 March 2016. The film grossed over $14 million worldwide from a $5 million budget.

== Plot ==
Maria Harwood has not recovered from the tragedy of losing her son Oliver, who drowned in a car accident in India. Maria instead rescued her daughter, Lucy, because Oliver's leg was trapped and Maria was unable to free it. Maria has been consumed by her guilt ever since. In the hospital following a suicide attempt, Maria is comforted by her housekeeper Piki. Piki asks Maria if she wants one final chance to say goodbye to Oliver. Piki explains that she has been in a similar predicament: she lost her own daughter in a drowning incident. According to Piki, there is an abandoned temple in her hometown where the barrier between the living and the dead is very thin. Maria must scatter her son's ashes at the temple steps and lock herself in. Oliver will speak to her once night falls. However, no matter what Oliver says, Maria must not open the temple door for him. Maria agrees and the pair have Oliver's body exhumed and burned. Maria notices some strange men covered in ash. Piki explains that they are Aghoris who consume the flesh of the dead and coat themselves in ash to strengthen their bonds between the worlds of the living and the dead.

The next day Maria arrives at the temple and follows Piki's instructions. Inside, she uncovers the mummified corpse of a woman. Night falls and Oliver begins talking to Maria. Maria apologizes to Oliver for leaving him. Oliver pleads with Maria to open the door but she explains that she cannot. When Oliver says he has to leave, Maria panics, wanting more time and opens the door, but sees no one. She returns home the next day. Now having closure, she focuses her attention on her husband, Michael, and Lucy but doesn't tell Piki that she opened the door. Strange things start happening: their piano plays itself and Lucy tells Maria that Oliver has come back and that he is hiding from someone. Lucy also tells Maria that she should not let Michael know about Oliver's return until Oliver is ready. In Oliver's room, a chair moves toward her along with a copy of The Jungle Book, which Maria had been reading to Oliver before the accident. Maria reads the book aloud. Piki notices that the nearby plants have started dying and realizes that Maria disobeyed her instructions.

Later, the decomposed body of Oliver appears near Lucy. Maria discovers a bloody bite mark on Lucy's shoulder when giving her a bath. Lucy, who was pleased with Oliver's return, tells Maria that she no longer likes Oliver. Maria tells Oliver that he musn't hurt Lucy. Oliver pulls out the chair and book again and Maria promises to read to him as long as he doesn't hurt Lucy. An aghori appears at the house and Maria is chased by the mummified body from the temple. Piki is outraged and confronts Maria; due to Maria's actions, Oliver's soul cannot reincarnate and has become evil. She reveals to Maria that the strange figure she has been seeing is Mrtyu, the gatekeeper of the underworld, who reclaims the errant souls of the dead. Piki urges Maria to burn all of Oliver's possessions to break his hold on the living world.

Oliver appears in the guise of Piki's dead daughter and lures Piki to a pond where he drowns her. Michael discovers Maria burning Oliver's possessions. He does not believe Maria's story, and Lucy suddenly denies any knowledge of Oliver returning. Maria realises that Oliver has possessed Lucy. Michael believes that Maria is becoming mentally unhinged and locks her in a room.

The aghoris crowd the house. The possessed Lucy kills the Harwood's dog with a knife and stabs Michael. Maria escapes the locked room and finds aghoris in Oliver's room chanting over Lucy's body. Unable to remove Oliver's spirit from Lucy, they plan to sacrifice her. Michael stops them and Maria commands Oliver to leave. Oliver says he is scared, but Maria says she will go with him. Oliver's spirit leaves Lucy's body and enters Maria's. She charges the aghoris and demands they take her instead. Their leader fatally stabs her. She falls and awakens in the room alone. Mrtyu appears and takes Maria to the afterlife.

Maria then wakes up and briefly believes that she is alive. She hears Michael's voice call out for her. She sees the temple steps and realises Michael is attempting the same ritual to bring back Maria as she did with Oliver. Maria screams for him not to open the door, but by not listening to it, this horror is repeated again.

== Cast ==
- Sarah Wayne Callies as Maria Harwood
- Jeremy Sisto as Michael Harwood, Maria's husband
- Sofia Rosinsky as Lucy Harwood, Maria and Michael's old daughter
- Logan Creran as Oliver Harwood, Maria and Michael's deceased young son
- Jax Malcolm as the voice of Oliver
- Suchitra Pillai as Piki
- Javier Botet as Mrtyu

== Production ==
Producer Alexandre Aja came across the Johannes Roberts and Ernest Riera's script for The Other Side of the Door and was impressed enough that he wanted to produce it. Aja met with Roberts to see if they could work together and asked which of Roberts' prior films Aja should watch. At Roberts' suggestion, Aja saw F and Storage 24 and felt they showed Roberts could efficiently and effectively use limited resources to get the most production values possible.

The film was shot on location in and around Mumbai, India.

== Release ==
The film was originally scheduled to be released on 26 February 2016. However, the release date was pushed back to 11 March 2016 and then later moved up to 4 March 2016.

=== Home media ===
The Other Side of the Door was released on DVD and Blu-ray by 20th Century Fox Home Entertainment on June 7, 2016.

=== Streaming ===
The film became available on Disney+ on October 22, 2021.

== Reception ==
=== Box office ===
The film opened on March 4, 2016, in limited release at only 546 locations where it got $1.2 million opening at No. 16. It grossed $3,000,342 in the United States. The film was a success internationally debuting top five across the world for a total of $14,332,467. In France the film opened at No. 4 and grossed $1,851,016.

=== Critical response ===
On Rotten Tomatoes, the film has an approval rating of 35%, based on reviews from 37 critics, with an average rating of 4.60/10. The site's critical consensus reads: "Laden with flimsy jump scares and cheap stereotypes, The Other Side of the Door wastes solid work from Sarah Wayne Callies on thoroughly middling horror fare." On Metacritic, the film has a score of 41% based on reviews from 10 critics, indicating "mixed or average reviews".

Christian Holub from Entertainment Weekly gave the film a B+, writing: "Like all the best horror, The Other Side of the Door is concerned not just with what freaks us out on a gut level, but the deeply-repressed anxieties that truly terrify us." Critic Tim Janson at the SciFi Movie Page gave the film two stars out of five, stating the film "is a predictable, by-the-numbers affair which marks no new territory."

Tom Huddleston of Time Out noted how the film panders to seamier representations of India "packed with scowling beggars, scuttling cockroaches, dutiful housemaids and shady shamans" — and that by doing so, the film was ultimately "so tasteless and knee-jerk in its depiction that it makes Indiana Jones and the Temple of Doom look like a triumph of racial awareness." Geoff Berkshire of Variety agreed with that assessment, adding "with a bare minimum of anthropological curiosity ... there's no interest in mining the setting for anything other than exploitation."
