= Sofia Rosinsky =

American actress (born 2006)

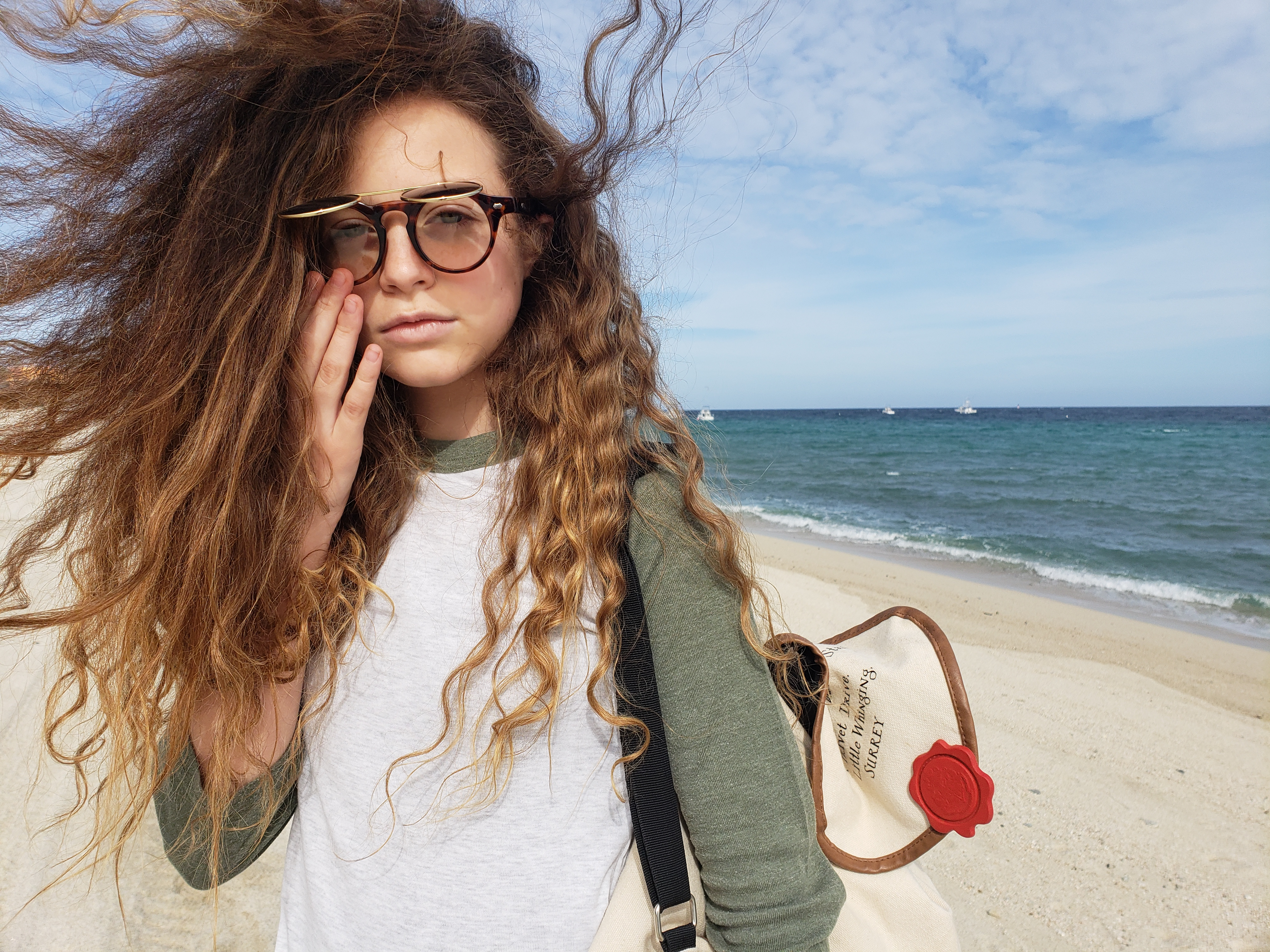
- Rosinsky in Mexico, 2019
- Born: June 10, 2006 (age 20)
- Occupation: Actress
- Years active: 2012–present

Sofia Rosinsky (born June 10, 2006) is an American actress, who began her career as a child actress.

== Personal life ==
Rosinsky's mother is actress K. Louise Middleton, studied with acting coach Sanford Meisner. She began acting at age five. She is half-Jewish on her father's side, whose family is from Ukraine.

== Career ==
Rosinsky had a role in the 2016 horror film The Other Side of the Door. In 2018, Rosinsky starred in the short film Faery, alongside Tessa Ferrer and William Ostrander. The film was directed by her sister and producer partner, actor Alexis Rosinsky, who won the "Breakthrough Director" award at the Hollywood Reel Independent Film Festival for the film.

In 2019, Rosinsky played Zora Morris in the Disney Channel television miniseries Fast Layne. In April 2021, she was cast in a co-leading role of Mac Coyle on the Amazon Prime Video science-fiction television series Paper Girls, which was released in July 2022. In 2023, Rosinsky played Tonya in Young Sheldon for 2 episodes.

== Filmography ==
=== Film appearances ===
Year	Title	Role	Notes	Ref.
2016	The Other Side of the Door	Lucy Harwood		
2017	Our Little Secret	Abigail		
2018	The Passing Parade	Errol's Inner Child		
2018	Where Is She Now	Producer		
2019	A Wake	Molly	Direct-to-video film	

=== Television appearances ===
Year	Title	Role	Notes	Ref.
2013	Bloodline	Bird	Unsold television pilot	
2015	Family Fortune	Young Fortune	Unsold television pilot	
2016	Criminal Minds: Beyond Borders	Grace Wagner	Episode: "Paper Orphans"	
2016	My Best Friend	Shelby	Television film	
2016	Forever Boys	Blanche	Unsold television pilot	
2019	Fast Layne	Zora Morris	Main role	
2022	Paper Girls	Mac Coyle	Main role	
2023	Young Sheldon	Tonya	2 episodes	
2024	Death and Other Details	Yeva	Recurring role	
2026	The Miniature Wife	Lulu Littlejohn		

== Awards and nominations ==
Year	Award	Category	Nominated work	Result	Ref.
2015	48 Hour Film Project	Best Actress	Zoe and the Prince	Won	
2015	48 Hour Film Project	Best Ensemble Acting (shared with cast members)	Zoe and the Prince	Won	
2017	Young Artist Awards	Best Performance in a Feature Film – Leading Young Actress	The Other Side of the Door	Won	
2017	Young Artist Awards	Best Performance in a TV Series – Guest Starring Young Actress	Criminal Minds: Beyond Borders	Nominated	
2017	Young Entertainer Awards	Best Leading Young Actress – Feature Film	The Other Side of the Door	Won	
