= Jason Hall (writer) =

American comic book writer

Jason Hall is an American comic book writer. His works include the creator-owned graphic novel series Pistolwhip (nominated for multiple prestigious Harvey Awards and one of Time Magazine's Top 10 Graphic Novels of 2001), Beware the Creeper and Trigger for DC/Vertigo, Batman Adventures, Justice League Adventures, Justice League Unlimited, Superman, Detective Comics, Ben 10, Samurai Jack, and Dexter's Laboratory for DC Comics, and Star Wars and Hellboy Animated for Dark Horse Comics.

== Works ==
=== DC Comics ===
- Batman: Gotham Adventures #51 - "Early Thaw"
- Batman Adventures #15 - "Best Served Cold"
- Justice League Adventures #20 - "Emotional Baggage"
- Justice League Adventures #28 - "Future Imperfect"
- Detective Comics #782 - "The Mourning After"
- Justice League: The Animated Series Guide (DK Publishing)
- Beware the Creeper (Vertigo)
- Trigger (Vertigo)
- Justice League Unlimited #33 - "Everything Old is New Again"
- Ben 10 (Cartoon Network Action Pack #22, 23, 25, 26)
- Ben 10: Alien Force (Cartoon Network Action Pack #41, 46)
- Ben 10: Ultimate Alien (Cartoon Network Action Pack #TBD)
- Dexter's Laboratory (Cartoon Network Block Party #57)
- Samurai Jack (Cartoon Network Action Pack #34, 38, 40, 44)
- Superman 80-Page Giant (2010) - "Superman is My Co-Pilot"

=== Dark Horse Comics ===
- Hellboy Animated Volume 3: The Menagerie
- Hellboy: The Companion - The Official Hellboy Timeline
- The Messengers - Graphic Novel Adaptation
- The Amazing Adventures of the Escapist #5 - "The Final Curtain"
- Crush
- Star Wars Tales #10, 11, 13-19
- Star Wars: Clone Wars Adventures Volumes 8 & 10
- Star Wars: Full of Surprises (Hasbro - Toys R Us Give-a-way)
- Star Wars: Practice Makes Perfect (Hasbro - Toys R Us Give-a-way)
- Star Wars: A Jedi's Most Precious Weapon (Hasbro - Toys R Us Give-a-way)
- Star Wars: Machines of War (Hasbro - Toys R Us Give-a-way)
- Dark Horse Maverick: Happy Endings - "Pistolwhip Presents: January"
- The Complete Pistolwhip (Hardcover collecting the complete series in full-color)

=== Top Shelf Comics ===
- Pistolwhip
- Pistolwhip: The Yellow Menace
- Mephisto and the Empty Box

=== Th3rd World Studios ===
- Space Doubles #2 - "A Saucerful of Secrets"

== Awards and recognition ==
- Harvey Award Nomination: Best New Talent, 2002
- Harvey Award Nomination: Best Graphic Album of Original Work, 2002 (Pistolwhip)
- Time Magazine's Top 10 Graphic Novels of 2001 (Pistolwhip)
- Wizard Magazine's Best Indy Comics of 2001 (Pistolwhip / Mephisto and the Empty Box)
- Wizard Magazine's Top 25 Indy Comics of All Time (Pistolwhip series)
