= Reel Grrls =

US-based non-profit organization

- Formation: 2001; 25 years ago
- Founder: Malory Graham
- Type: Nonprofit
- Location: Seattle, Washington, United States
- Services: Filmmaking and media literacy programs for teenage girls

Reel Grrls is a non-profit organization in Seattle, Washington which has filmmaking and media literacy program for teenage girls.

== Comcast controversy ==
In 2011, a Twitter post sparked controversy involving an $18,000 grant that Comcast had made for 15 teenage girls to attend programs' summer program. After the FCC approved the Comcast-NBC Universal merger 4-1, the group tweeted "OMG! @FCC Commissioner Baker voted 2 approve Comcast/NBC merger & is now lving FCC for A JOB AT COMCAST?!? http://su.pr/1trT4z #mediajustice" The move by FCC Commissioner Meredith Attwell Baker was widely criticized at the time, though Comcast said it did not begin discussions of employment until after the decision. A vice president of communications at Comcast, Steve Kipp, sent the group a letter that "I hope you can respect that this Tweet has put me in an indefensible position with my bosses. I cannot continue to ask them to approve funding for Reel Grrls, knowing that the digital footprint your organization has created about Comcast is a negative one" and "Given the fact that Comcast has been a major supporter of Reel Grrls for several years now, I am frankly shocked that your organization is slamming us on Twitter. I cannot in good conscience continue to provide you with funding—especially when there are so many other deserving nonprofits in town."

The group responded with a video, and the story gained national media attention. Comcast later apologized, calling Kipp's actions unauthorized and stating funding was not at risk. but the Huffington Post opined, "Comcast and its foundation have donated $1.8 billion to local nonprofits over the past decade. How many times did those groups have to think twice before saying something about their Internet service or cable bills? How many emails have been written like this that didn't get leaked to the press?". By contrast, the executive director of another nonprofit, a Boys and Girls Club of Burlington, Vermont, told the New York Times she had submitted a letter favoring the Comcast merger to the FCC after she was sent a draft by Comcast, which had given her organization $20,000 for new equipment.

The group declined Comcast funding and sought alternative funding. By June 7th, they raised over $24,000 from 620 donors.

In light of the events with Comcast last week, we've decided to change the focus of our summer apprenticeship program. Participants will now produce short films exploring media reform and media justice issues in partnership with Free Press and the Center for Media Justice. The program will include a trip to the Allied Media Conference in Detroit for all participants who are able to attend.
