= List of Yowamushi Pedal chapters =

Yowamushi Pedal is written and illustrated by Wataru Watanabe. It started in Akita Shoten's Weekly Shōnen Champion on February 21, 2008. The series was later published in tankōbon format by Akita Shoten, with the first volume being released on July 8, 2008. As of July 2026, 101 volumes have been published. On August 8, 2013, a limited-edition version of the 29th volume of Yowamushi Pedal was released with a bundled anime DVD directed by Osamu Nabeshime and produced by TMS Entertainment.

The manga is published in English by Yen Press in North America, who are releasing the series as two-in-one omnibuses. The first omnibus volume was released on December 15, 2015.

== Yowamushi Pedal volumes ==
This is the first and main series of the manga which was written and illustrated by Wataru Watanabe. As of May 2026 the series has been collected into 100 volumes and is ongoing. The chapter numbering starts with "Ride", followed by the chapter number. An anime television series adaptation aired from October 2013 to July 2014, followed by a second season aired from October 2014 to March 2015, a third season aired from January to June 2017, a fourth season aired from January to June 2018, and a fifth season aired from October 2022 to March 2023. A live-action television drama adaptation aired in August 2016. A live-action film adaptation is set to release in August 2020.

No.	Original release date	Original ISBN	English release date	English ISBN
1	July 8, 2008	978-4-253-21451-3	December 15, 2015	978-0-316-30952-3
RIDE.1 "Because I Can Go to Akiba for Free" (アキバにタダで行けるから, "Akiba ni Tada de Ikeru kara"); RIDE.2 "Did You Really Go to Akiba?" (本当にアキバに行ったの？, "Hontō ni Akiba ni Itta no?"); RIDE.3 "What Do You Mean by "Race"?" (勝負って何ですか？, "Shōbu tte nan desu ka?"); RIDE.4 "To Recruit More Members" (部員をふやすため, "Buin o Fuyasu tame"); RIDE.5 "There's No Way He's Here!" (来るわけない！, "Kuru wake nai!"); RIDE.6 "Cadence" (ケイダンス, "Keidansu"); RIDE.7 "He Went All the Way to Akiba on That Bike?" (そんな自転車でアキバまで..., "Sonna Jitensha de Akiba made...")
2	September 8, 2008	978-4-253-21452-0	December 15, 2015	978-0-316-30952-3
RIDE.8 "The Race's Conclusion" (決着, "Ketchaku"); RIDE.9 "A Guy Who's Always Got to Stand Out" (目立ってナンボの男, "Medatte Nanbo no Otoko"); RIDE.10 "A Sense of Camaraderie" (相棒感いうやつや, "Aibō-kan yū yatsu ya"); RIDE.11 "The Chase" (追走, "Tsuisō"); RIDE.12 "Gear Shift" (ギアチェンジ, "Gia Chenji"); RIDE.13 "A Train" (列車, "Ressha"); RIDE.14 "The Sohoku High School Bicycle Racing Club" (総北高校自転車競技部, "Sōhoku-Kōkō Jitensha Kyōgi-bu"); RIDE.15 "If I've Got Potential..." (ボクに可能性があるなら, "Boku ni Kanōsei ga Aru nara"); RIDE.16 "The Forty Minutes Before the Race" (レースまでの40分, "Rēsu made no Yonji-ppun")
3	November 7, 2008	978-4-253-21453-7	April 26, 2016	978-0-316-35468-4
RIDE.17 "The Welcome Race Begins" (ウエルカムレース スタート, "Uerukamu Rēsu Sutāto"); RIDE.18 "The First Stage!" (第1ステージ突入！, "Dai-Ichi Sutēji Totsunyū!"); RIDE.19 "Shifting Into Deceleration" (変則x失速, "Hensoku kakeru Shissoku"); RIDE.20 "One With the Bicycle" (人車一体, "Jin-sha-Ittai"); RIDE.21 "You Are Fast!" (あなたは速いわ‼, "Anata wa Hayai wa!!"); RIDE.22 "He Can't Catch Up" (追いつかない, "Oitsukanai"); RIDE.23 "The Competition" (サグリアイ, "Saguriai"); RIDE.24 "Climb" (クライム‼, "Kuraimu‼"); RIDE.25 "Reaching the Summit" (登ってきた男, "Nobottekita Otoko")
4	January 8, 2009	978-4-253-21454-4	April 26, 2016	978-0-316-35468-4
RIDE.26 "Sprint Climb!!" (スプリントクライム‼, "Supurinto kuraimu!!"); RIDE.27 "Naruko Shoukichi!" (鳴子章吉！, "Naruko Shōkichi!"); RIDE.28 "Faster Than Anyone" (誰よりも速く, "Dare yori mo Hayaku"); RIDE.29 "Pride" (プライド, "Puraido"); RIDE.30 "Something I Can Do" (ぼくに出来ること, "Boku ni Dekiru Koto"); RIDE.31 "What He Lacks As A Climber" (クライマーとしての欠点, "Kuraimā to shite no Ketten"); RIDE.32 "Full Speed Ahead" (全力x全力, "Zenryoku kakeru Zenryoku"); RIDE.33 "The Winner Is Onoda!" (勝者 小野田！, "Shōsha Onoda!"); RIDE.34 "Result" (リザルト, "Rizaruto")
5	March 6, 2009	978-4-253-21455-1	August 30, 2016	978-0-316-393645
RIDE.35 "Training Begins!" (個人練習 開始！, "Kojin Renshū Kaishi!"); RIDE.36 "Peak Spider" (ピーク スパイダー, "Pīku Supaidā"); RIDE.37 "Makishima" (巻島, "Makishima"); RIDE.38 "Inter-High Qualifiers" (インターハイ予選, "Intāhai Yosen"); RIDE.39 "Sohoku" (総北, "Sōhoku"); RIDE.40 "The Cyclist from Hakone" (箱根の自転車乗り, "Hakone no Jitensha-nori"); RIDE.41 "First Day of Camp!" (合宿初日！, "Gasshuku Shonichi!"); RIDE.42 "Sealed Away" (封じ, "Fūji"); RIDE.43 "The Challenge" (しかけの壁, "Shikake no Kabe")
6	June 8, 2009	978-4-253-21456-8	August 30, 2016	978-0-316-39364-5
RIDE.44 "Imaizumi And Naruko's 1000km" (今泉と鳴子の1000km, "Imaizumi to Naruko no Sen-kiromētoru"); RIDE.45 "Hakone Academy" (箱根学園, "Hakone-Gakuen"); RIDE.46 "Second Meeting at Dawn" (朝霧の再会, "Asagiri no Saikai"); RIDE.47 "Sangaku And Sakamichi" (山岳x坂道, "Sangaku kakeru Sakamichi"); RIDE.48 "Inter-High" (インターハイ, "Intāhai"); RIDE.49 "740km" (「740km」, "Nanahyakuyonji-kkiromētoru"); RIDE.50 "Strategy" (策略, "Sakuryaku"); RIDE.51 "Team of Two" (2人, "Futari"); RIDE.52 "Breakthrough" (一点突破, "Ittentoppa")
7	August 7, 2009	978-4-253-21457-5	December 20, 2016	978-0-316-39366-9
RIDE.53 "60 Seconds" (限界60秒, "Genkai Rokujū-byō"); RIDE.54 "Out of Ideas" (万策尽きて, "Bansaku Tsukite"); RIDE.55 "Closing In" (迫る, "Semaru"); RIDE.56 "In Last Position" (最後尾の小野田, "Saikōbi no Onoda"); RIDE.57 "Showdown" (最終決着, "Saishū Ketchaku"); RIDE.58 "Winners and Losers" (勝者と敗者, "Shōsha to Haisha"); RIDE.59 "All-Out Battle" (全力の勝負, "Zenryoku no Shōbu"); RIDE.60 "Fourth Day's Rain" (雨の4日目, "Ame no Yo-kka-me"); RIDE.61 "Pedal" (ペダル, "Pedaru")
8	November 6, 2009	978-4-253-21458-2	December 20, 2016	978-0-316-39366-9
RIDE.62 "Onoda Makes the Goal!" (小野田、ゴールへ！, "Onoda, Gōru e!"); RIDE.63 "A New Start" (新たなるスタート, "Aratanaru Sutāto"); RIDE.64 "Sohoku in Action!" (総北始動！, "Sōhoku Shidō!"); RIDE.65 "Manami Sangaku" (真波山岳, "Manami Sangaku"); RIDE.66 "Road Battle" (道との闘い, "Michi to no Tatakai"); RIDE.67 "Snake of the Stone Path" (石道の蛇, "Sekidō no Hebi"); RIDE.68 "Unwavering Will" (譲れぬ信念, "Yuzurenu Shinnen"); RIDE.69 "Fall" (落下, "Rakka")
9	December 8, 2009	978-4-253-21459-9	April 18, 2017	978-0-316-39367-6
RIDE.70 "Utter Defeat" (惨敗, "Zanpai"); RIDE.71 "Inter-High Opening" (インターハイ開幕, "Intāhai Kaimaku"); RIDE.72 "The Other Reunion" (もう1つの再会, "Mō Hito-tsu no Saikai"); RIDE.73 "Midousuji" (御堂筋, "Midōsuji"); RIDE.74 "Calm Before the Storm" (スタートの鼓動, "Sutāto no Kodō"); RIDE.75 "Starting Line" (スタートライン, "Sutāto Rain"); RIDE.76 "Top Sprinter!!" (トップスプリンター‼, "Toppu Supurintā‼"); RIDE.77 "Race!!" (競争‼, "Kyōsō!!"); RIDE.78 "Sprint Machine!!" (スプリントマシーン‼, "Supurinto Mashīn!!")
10	March 8, 2010	978-4-253-21460-5	April 18, 2017	978-0-316-39367-6
RIDE.79 "Atonement" (贖罪, "Shokuzai"); RIDE.80 "No More Tricks!!" (かくし玉はない‼, "Kakushidama wa Nai!!"); RIDE.81 "Izumida's Anxiety" (震える泉田, "Furueru Izumida"); RIDE.82 "Awakening" (覚醒, "Kakusei"); RIDE.83 "Loss" (負け, "Make"); RIDE.84 "Trio" (三つ巴, "Mitsudomoe"); RIDE.85 "Fast Sprinter" (FAST SPRINTER, "Fasuto Supurintā"); RIDE.86 "Exchange" (交代, "Kōtai")
11	April 8, 2010	978-4-253-21463-6	August 22, 2017	978-0-316-39368-3
RIDE.87 "Hakone" (箱根, "Hakone"); RIDE.88 "I Can See the Sky" (空が見える, "Sora ga Mieru"); RIDE.89 "100 People" (100人, "Hyaku-nin"); RIDE.90 "Humming" (鼻歌, "Hanauta"); RIDE.91 "God of the Mountain Toudou" (山神東堂, "Sanshin Tōdō"); RIDE.92 "Climber" (クライマー, "Kuraimā"); RIDE.93 "One More Climber" (もう1人のクライマー, "Mō Hitori no Kuraimā"); RIDE.94 "The Barrier of 100 People" (100人の関所, "Hyaku-nin no Sekisho")
12	June 8, 2010	978-4-253-21464-3	August 22, 2017	978-0-316-39368-3
RIDE.95 "The 100th Person" (百人目, "Hyaku-nin-me"); RIDE.96 "Hopes Arrive" (想い、届く, "Omoi, Todoku"); RIDE.97 "Throw Away Hope" (希望を捨てて, "Kibō o Sutete"); RIDE.98 "Climax" (最高潮, "Saikōchō"); RIDE.99 "Last Climb" (最後勝負, "Saigo Shōbu"); RIDE.100 "Summit" (山頂, "Sanchō"); RIDE.101 "The Aces Make Their Moves" (動き出す、エース, "Ugokidasu, Ēsu"); RIDE.102 "In the Lead!!" (先行‼, "Senkō!!"); RIDE.103 "Arakita" (荒北, "Arakita")
13	August 6, 2010	978-4-253-21465-0	December 19, 2017	978-0-316-55860-0
RIDE.104 "Essence" (本質, "Honshitsu"); RIDE.105 "Imaizumi Rages" (猛る今泉, "Takeru Imaizumi"); RIDE.106 "Kyoto #91: Midousuji" (京都91番 御堂筋, "Kyōto Kyūjūichi-ban Midōsuji"); RIDE.107 "As Planned" (予定通り, "Yotei-dōri"); RIDE.108 "The Strong Three" (強者3人, "Kyōsha San-nin"); RIDE.109 "Zekken" (ゼッケン, "Zekken"); RIDE.110 "Darkening" (陰る, "Kageru"); RIDE.111 "Night of Hope" (希望の夜, "Kibō no Yoru"); RIDE.112 "The 2nd Day Starts" (2日目スタート, "Futsu-ka-me Sutāto")
14	October 8, 2010	978-4-253-21466-7	December 19, 2017	978-0-316-55860-0
RIDE.113 "Dark Clouds" (暗雲, "An'un"); RIDE.114 "Not the Time to Stop" (止まらぬ刻, "Tomaranu Toki"); RIDE.115 "Tadokoro, Sinking" (沈む、田所, "Shizumu, Tadokoro"); RIDE.116 "Here Comes Sakamichi" (坂道、来る, "Sakamichi, Kuru"); RIDE.117 "Hime Na No Da" (ヒメなのだ, "Hime na no da"); RIDE.118 "Hime Na No Da 2" (ヒメなのだ2, "Hime na no da Ni"); RIDE.119 "Joining Up" (交流, "Kōryū"); Extra Story. "Yowamushi Pedal Extra Story" (弱虫ペダル番外編, "Yowamushi Pedaru Bangaihen")
15	December 8, 2010	978-4-253-21467-4	April 24, 2018	978-0-316-52078-2
RIDE.120 "Kyoto Fushimi Moves" (京都伏見始動, "Kyōto Fushimi Shidō"); RIDE.121 "Provocation" (挑発, "Chōhatsu"); RIDE.122 "Hakone Academy #4" (箱根学園 4番, "Hakone-Gakuen Yo-ban"); RIDE.123 "Shinkai" (新開, "Shinkai"); RIDE.124 "Sohoku's Disadvantage" (総北劣勢, "Sōhoku Ressei"); RIDE.125 "Buuuuu-" (ウーウーウー, "Ū Ū Ū"); RIDE.126 "Shinkai, Cornered" (追いつめられた新開, "Oitsumerareta Shinkai"); RIDE.127 "Demon" (鬼, "Oni"); RIDE.128 "The Man Who Triumphs" (勝利する男, "Shōri-suru Otoko")
16	March 8, 2011	978-4-253-21468-1	April 24, 2018	978-0-316-52078-2
RIDE.129 "Strongest and Fastest" (最強最速, "Saikyō Saisoku"); RIDE.130 "The Second Half of the Battle" (後半戦, "Kōhan-sen"); RIDE.131 "Onoda's Riding" (小野田の走り, "Onoda no Hashiri"); RIDE.132 "Sohoku, Together!!" (総北揃う‼, "Sōhoku Sorou!!"); RIDE.133 "The End of the Sprinters" (スプリンターの結末, "Supurintā no Ketsumatsu"); RIDE.134 "Discarded Baggage" (捨てられた荷物, "Suterareta Nimotsu"); RIDE.135 "Replacing the Kings" (王者交代, "Ōja Kōtai"); RIDE.136 "The Last of the Kings" (王者の最後, "Ōja no Saigo"); RIDE.137 "Single Digit Zekken" (シングルゼッケン, "Shinguru Zekken")
17	May 6, 2011	978-4-253-21469-8	August 21, 2018	978-0-316-52084-3
RIDE.138 "Kings" (王者, "Ōja"); RIDE.139 "The Soul of Sohoku" (総北の魂, "Sōhoku no Tamashii"); RIDE.140 "The Last Team Strategy" (最後のチーム戦, "Saigo no Chīmu-sen"); RIDE.141 "Phase 49" (段階49, "Dankai Yonjūkyū"); RIDE.142 "The Fastest, Shinkai!" (最速の新開！, "Saisoku no Shinkai!"); RIDE.143 "A Reason to Ride" (走る理由, "Hashiru Riyū"); RIDE.144 "The Last Deadlock" (最終局面, "Saishū Kyokumen"); RIDE.145 "The 3 Meters of Perseverance" (がまんの3メートル, "Gaman no San-mētoru"); RIDE.146 "Movement" (動く, "Ugoku")
18	July 8, 2011	978-4-253-21470-4	August 21, 2018	978-0-316-52084-3
RIDE.147 "Margin" (秒差, "Byōsa"); RIDE.148 "Ace" (エース, "Ēsu"); RIDE.149 "Two Aces" (2人のエース, "Futari no Ēsu"); RIDE.150 "Approach" (接近, "Sekkin"); RIDE.151 "A Passion for Winning" (勝利への情念, "Shōri e no Jōnen"); RIDE.152 "Akira" (翔, "Akira"); RIDE.153 "Victory" (勝利, "Shōri"); RIDE.154 "The Winner of the Second Stage!!" (弟2ステージ決着‼, "Dai-Ni-Sutēji Ketchaku‼")
19	September 8, 2011	978-4-253-21472-8	December 11, 2018	978-0-316-52091-1
RIDE.155 "Sohoku in Second Place" (総北2位, "Sōhoku Ni-i"); RIDE.156 "Midousuji's Decision" (御堂筋の決意, "Midōsuji no Ketsui"); RIDE.157 "The Three Kilometers to The Pharmacy" (薬局までの3km, "Yakkyoku made no San-kiromētoru"); RIDE.158 "The Third Day Begins!" (動き出す、3日目!, "Ugokidasu, Mi-kka-me!"); RIDE.159 "Lucky Man Machimiya" (モってる男 待宮, "Motteru Otoko Machimiya"); RIDE.160 "The Man Who Won't Come" (来ない男, "Konai Otoko"); RIDE.161 "The Last Start" (最後のスタート, "Saigo no Sutāto"); RIDE.162 "Cooperation" (協調, "Kyōchō"); RIDE.163 "Reunion With the Front" (先頭交流, "Sentō Kōryū")
20	December 8, 2011	978-4-253-21473-5	December 11, 2018	978-0-316-52091-1
RIDE.164 "The Pack Approaches" (迫る、集団, "Semaru, Shūdan"); RIDE.165 "Hiroshima Kureminami" (広島呉南, "Hiroshima Kureminami"); RIDE.166 "The Terrible Machimiya" (戦慄の待宮, "Senritsu no Machimiya"); RIDE.167 "ARAKITA" (アラキタ, "Arakita"); RIDE.168 "The Three's Chase!!" (3人の追走‼, "San-nin no Tsuisō!!"); RIDE.169 "Jet Coaster Ride" (ジェットコースターライド, "Jetto Kōsutā Raido"); RIDE.170 "Con artist" (ペテン師, "Peten-shi"); RIDE.171 "The Fighting Dog of Kure" (呉の闘犬, "Kure no Tōken"); RIDE.172 "Fighting Dog, Howl!" (闘犬、吠える！, "Tōken, Hoeru!")
21	February 8, 2012	978-4-253-21474-2	April 30, 2019	978-0-316-52095-9
RIDE.173 "Explosive Power Born from a Grudge" (恨みという爆薬, "Urami to yū Bakuyaku"); RIDE.174 "My Old Self" (昔のオレに, "Mukashi no Ore ni"); RIDE.175 ""Forward"" (「前に」, "Mae ni"); RIDE.176 "The Domain That Lies Ahead" (その先の領域, "Sono Saki no Ryōiki"); RIDE.177 "The Teams Assemble" (チーム終結, "Chīmu Shūketsu"); RIDE.178 "Real Survival" (本当のサバイバル, "Hontō no Sabaibaru"); RIDE.179 "Last Stage" (ラストステージ, "Rasuto Sutēji"); RIDE.180 "For One Jersey" (1枚のジャージを, "Ichi-mai no Jāji o"); RIDE.181 "Pursuit!!" (追いつく!!, "Oitsuku!!")
22	May 8, 2012	978-4-253-21475-9	April 30, 2019	978-0-316-52095-9
RIDE.182 "Selection" (セレクション, "Serekushon"); RIDE.183 "Izumida's Pride" (泉田の誇り, "Izumida no Hokori"); RIDE.184 "The Third-years' Decision" (3年の決意, "San-nen no Ketsui"); RIDE.185 "Their Backs" (背中, "Senaka"); RIDE.186 "The Six Line Up!!" (6人、並ぶ‼, "Roku-nin, Narabu‼"); RIDE.187 "Flat-Out Run at Lake Yamanaka" (激走、山中湖, "Gekisō, Yamanaka-ko"); RIDE.188 "Tadokoro, Last Sprint" (田所、ラストスプリント, "Tadokoro, Rasuto Supurinto"); RIDE.189 "The End of the Ace" (エースの終わり, "Ēsu no Owari"); RIDE.190 "The Final Strategy" (最後の作戦, "Saigo no Sakusen"); Extra Story 2. "Yowamushi Pedal Bangaihen Butai "Yowamushi Pedal" Geki Atsu Report!" (弱虫ペダル番外編 舞台『弱虫ペダル』激アツレポート！, "Yowamushi Pedaru Bangaihen Butai "Yowamushi Pedaru" Gekiatsu Repōto!")
23	June 8, 2012	978-4-253-21476-6	September 3, 2019	978-0-316-52099-7
RIDE.191 "The Trusted Four" (託された4人, "Takusareta Yo-nin"); RIDE.192 "Naruko's True Worth!!" (鳴子！真骨頂‼, "Naruko! Shinkotchō!!"); RIDE.193 "The Unveiling!!" (御開帳‼, "Gokaichō!!"); RIDE.194 "Obstinacy" (意地, "Iji"); RIDE.195 "The Man Who Fulfilled His Duty" (やり遂げた男, "Yaritogeta Otoko"); RIDE.196 "Ace Imaizumi!" (エース 今泉！, "Ēsu Imaizumi!"); RIDE.197 "Evolution" (進化, "Shinka"); RIDE.198 "Awakening" (覚醒, "Kakusei"); RIDE.199 "The Persistent Man" (執念の男, "Shūnen no Otoko")
24	August 8, 2012	978-4-253-21477-3	September 3, 2019	978-0-316-52099-7
RIDE.200 "Unexpected" (予想ガイ, "Yosō Gai"); RIDE.201 "Hakone Academy #6" (箱根学園ゼッケン6番, "Hakone-Gakuen Zekken Roku-ban"); RIDE.202 "Manami's Smile" (真波の笑い, "Manami no Warai"); RIDE.203 "Wind" (風, "Kaze"); RIDE.204 "Step by Step" (一歩一歩, "Ippo Ippo"); RIDE.205 "Sohoku Glasses" (「総北メガネ」, "'Sōhoku Megane'"); RIDE.206 "Sakamichi, Off-Course" (坂道 コースアウト, "Sakamichi Kōsu Auto"); RIDE.207 "The End!!!" (決まる!!!, "Kimaru!!!"); Special Story. "Yowamushi Pedal Special Chapter: A Tale at Sohoku Cycling Club's Clubroom" (弱虫ペダル特別編 総北自転車部 部室譚, "Yowamushi Pedaru Tokubetsu-hen Sōhoku Jitensha-bu Bushitsu-tan")
25	October 5, 2012	978-4-253-21478-0	January 14, 2020	978-1-9753-8733-4
RIDE.208 "Sakamichi's Job" (坂道の役割, "Sakamichi no Yakuwari"); RIDE.209 "Erosion" (侵食, "Shinshoku"); RIDE.210 "The Two's Bond" (二人の絆, "Futari no Kizuna"); RIDE.211 "Imaizumi VS Midousuji" (今泉VS御堂筋, "Imaizumi tai Midōsuji"); RIDE.212 "A Close Battle" (ギリギリバトル, "Girigiri Batoru"); RIDE.213 "What Lies Ahead of Battle" (闘いの先にあるもの, "Tatakai no Saki ni Aru Mono"); RIDE.214 "Full Speed Dash" (全 力 疾 走, "Zenryoku Shissō"); RIDE.215 "#91" (91番, "Kyūjūichi-ban"); RIDE.216 "The Sixth Man" (6人目の男, "Roku-nin-me no Otoko")
26	December 7, 2012	978-4-253-21479-7	January 14, 2020	978-1-9753-8733-4
RIDE.217 "Manami and Sakamichi" (真波と坂道, "Manami to Sakamichi"); RIDE.218 "The Will to Fight" (闘う意思, "Tatakau Ishi"); RIDE.219 "I Will Get Past You" (キミを抜く, "Kimi o Nuku"); RIDE.220 "Manami's Wings" (マナミノツバサ, "Manami no Tsubasa"); RIDE.221 "Manami Climbs" (真波、登る, "Manami, Noboru"); RIDE.222 "Shift Up" (シフトアップ, "Shifuto Appu"); RIDE.223 "Last Gear" (ラストギア, "Rasuto Gia"); RIDE.224 "Remaining, 1 km" (のこり、1km, "Nokori, Ichi-kiromētoru"); RIDE.225 "Straight Ahead" (まっすぐに, "Massugu ni")
27	March 8, 2013	978-4-253-21480-3	April 28, 2020	978-1-9753-0794-3
RIDE.226 "The Promised Road" (約束の道, "Yakusoku no Michi"); RIDE.227 "Let These Feelings Reach" (届け、思い, "Todoke, Omoi"); RIDE.228 "Simply to the Goal" (ただ、ゴールへ, "Tada, Gōru e"); RIDE.229 "Last Sprint" (ラストスプリント, "Rasuto Supurinto"); RIDE.230 "The One to Look Up at the Sky" (空を仰ぎし者, "Sora o Aogishi Mono"); RIDE.231 "Winner" (WINNER, "Winā"); RIDE.232 "To a Height of 15cm" (15cmの高みへ, "Jūgo-senchimētoru no Takami e"); RIDE.233 "Inter High Special Stage" (IHスペシャルステージ, "Intāhai Supesharu Sutēji"); RIDE.234 "New Machine" (ニューマシン, "Nyū Mashin")
28	May 8, 2013	978-4-253-22121-4	April 28, 2020	978-1-9753-0794-3
RIDE.235 "The Last Minegayama" (最後の峰ヶ山, "Saigo no Minegayama"); RIDE.236 "Reborn Sohoku" (新生総北, "Shinsei Sōhoku"); RIDE.237 "What Makishima Left Behind" (巻島が残したもの, "Makishima ga Nokoshita mono"); RIDE.238 "What Lights the Heart Aflame" (心焦がすもの, "Kokoro Kogasu mono"); RIDE.239 "The Third Man" (3人目の男, "San-nin-me no Otoko"); RIDE.240 "Metronome" (メトロノーム, "Metoronōmu"); RIDE.241 "Teammates in Middle School" (中学のチームメイト, "Chūgaku no Chīmumeito"); RIDE.242 "Ashikiba VS Sohoku" (葦木場VS総北, "Ashikiba tai Sōhoku"); RIDE.243 "Teshima, and the Riding of His Soul" (手島、魂の走り, "Teshima, Tamashii no Hashiri")
29	August 8, 2013	978-4-253-22122-1	September 22, 2020	978-1-9753-1057-8
RIDE.244 "The Fastest Man on Minegayama" (峰ヶ山で一番速い男, "Minegayama de Ichiban Hayai Otoko"); RIDE.245 "Ashikiba's Trail" (葦木場の道, "Ashikiba no Michi"); RIDE.246 "Sprinters!!!" (スプリンター！！！, "Supurintā!!!"); RIDE.247 "New Sohoku" (新・総北, "Shin. Sōhoku"); RIDE.248 "Sugimoto's Younger Brother" (杉元・弟, "Sugimoto. Otōto"); RIDE.249 "3-Minute Break" (3分間, "San-pun-kan"); RIDE.250 "Osaka" (大阪, "Ōsaka"); RIDE.251 "Bicycle Baritude" (自転車異種格闘技, "Jitensha Ishu Kakutōgi"); RIDE.252 "Naruko VS Midousuji" (鳴子VS御堂筋, "Naruko tai Midōsuji")
30	October 8, 2013	978-4-253-22123-8	September 22, 2020	978-1-9753-1057-8
RIDE.253 "Shaving Away at Each Other" (削り合い, "Kezuriai"); RIDE.254 "Locust" (飛蝗, "Batta"); RIDE.255 "The Man From Osaka" (大阪の男, "Ōsaka no Otoko"); RIDE.256 "Hakogaku, The Last Farewell Party" (箱根学園最後の走行会, "Hakone-Gakuen Saigo no Sōkō-kai"); RIDE.257 "The 4 Zekken" (4枚のゼッケン, "Yon-mai no Zekken"); RIDE.258 "To the Figure I Admire" (憧れの背中に, "Akogare no Senaka ni"); RIDE.259 "The Pair's Summit" (2つの頂上, "Futa-tsu no Chōjō"); RIDE.260 "Kuroda, Defiant" (黒田、逆らう, "Kuroda, Sakarau")
31	December 6, 2013	978-4-253-22124-5	December 15, 2020	978-1-9753-1060-8
RIDE.261 "Hakogaku's Goal Line" (箱根学園のゴールライン, "Hakone-Gakuen no Gōru Rain"); RIDE.262 "New Souhoku Start!!" (新総北スタート！！, "Shin Sōhoku Sutāto!!"); RIDE.263 "Sugimoto's Determination" (杉元の決意, "Sugimoto no Ketsui"); RIDE.264 "To the Wide World" (広い世界に, "Hiroi Sekai ni"); RIDE.265 "The First Opponent" (最初の敵, "Saisho no Teki"); RIDE.266 "The Miracle Pair" (驚異の2人, "Kyōi no Futari"); RIDE.267 "The 6th Man" (6人目の男, "Roku-nin-me no Otoko"); RIDE.268 "The Stronger Feelings" (きもちを強く, "Kimochi o Tsuyoku"); RIDE.269 "Kaburagi's Declaration" (鏑木の宣言, "Kaburagi no Sengen")
32	January 8, 2014	978-4-253-22125-2	December 15, 2020	978-1-9753-1060-8
RIDE.270 "The Bond Between the Sugimoto Brothers" (杉元兄弟の絆, "Sugimoto Kyōdai no Kizuna"); RIDE.271 "4 People Downhill" (4人のダウンヒル, "Yo-nin no Daunhiru"); RIDE.272 "Conclusion" (決着, "Ketchaku"); RIDE.273 "Final Preparation" (最後の覚悟, "Saigo no Kakugo"); RIDE.274 "New Sohoku 6 Members" (新・総北6人, "Shin. Sōhoku Roku-nin"); RIDE.275 "Kaburagi Issa's Debut Match!" (鏑木一差のデビュー戦！, "Kaburaki Issa no Debyū-sen！"); RIDE.276 "Trouble!" (トラブル！, "Toraburu!"); RIDE.277 "The Strength of 6" (6枚の力, "Roku-mai no Chikara"); RIDE.278 "The Man Who Doesn't Yield" (譲らない男たち, "Yuzuranai Otoko-tachi")
33	April 8, 2014	978-4-253-22126-9	April 20, 2021	978-1-9753-1063-9
RIDE.279 "Telephone" (電話, "Denwa"); RIDE.280 "1000km Once More" (1000km再び, "Sen-kiromētoru futatabi"); RIDE.281 "Kaburagi All Alone" (ひとりぼっちの鏑木, "Hitoribotchi no Kaburagi"); RIDE.282 "One More 3rd Year" (もう1人の3年生, "Mō Hitori no San-nensei"); RIDE.283 "Koga of the Thunderous Roar" (轟音の古賀, "Gōon no Koga"); RIDE.284 "Teshima's Determination" (手嶋の覚悟, "Teshima no Kakugo"); RIDE.285 "Teshima VS Koga" (手嶋VS古賀, "Teshima tai Koga"); RIDE.286 "The 2nd Day of the Training Camp Starts!!" (合宿2日目スタート！！, "Gasshuku Futsu-ka-me Sutāto!!"); RIDE.287 "1st Year Tag #73 Koga" (1年ゼッケン73番古賀, "Ichi-nen Zekken Nanajūsan-ban Koga")
34	June 6, 2014	978-4-253-22127-6	April 20, 2021	978-1-9753-1063-9
RIDE.288 "Teshima's Challenge" (手嶋の挑戦, "Teshima no Chōsen"); RIDE.289 "The Remaining 400m" (のこり400m, "Nokori Yonhyaku-mētoru"); RIDE.290 "The Average Person And the Genius" (凡人と天才, "Bonjin to Tensai"); RIDE.291 "Koga's Goal" (古賀のゴール, "Koga no Gōru"); RIDE.292 "Deep Wheel" (ディープホイール, "Dīpu Hoīru"); RIDE.293 "Fingertips" (指先, "Yubisaki"); RIDE.294 "1000km!" (1000km！, "Sen-kiromētoru!"); RIDE.295 "Start!!!" (スタート！！！, "Sutāto!!!")
35	August 8, 2014	978-4-253-22128-3	August 17, 2021	978-1-9753-1065-3
RIDE.296 "Single Digit Tag" (シングルゼッケン, "Shinguru Zekken"); RIDE.297 "Grappling With Each Other" (つかみ会い, "Tsukamiai"); RIDE.298 "Trembling" (触れる, "Fureru"); RIDE.299 "Confrontation" (対峙, "Taiji"); RIDE.300 "The Second Start" (二度目のスタート, "Ni-do-me no Sutāto"); RIDE.301 "Road That Leads to the Goal" (ゴールにつながる道, "Gōru ni Tsunagaru Michi"); RIDE.302 "Start Flag" (スタートフラッグ, "Sutāto Furaggu"); RIDE.303 "Sprinter?!" (スプリンター！？, "Supurintā!?")
36	October 8, 2014	978-4-253-22129-0	August 17, 2021	978-1-9753-1065-3
RIDE.304 "Expanding Aoyagi" (ふくらむ青八木, "Fukuramu Aoyagi"); RIDE.305 "Monster Doubashi" (怪道銅橋, "Kaidō Dōbashi"); RIDE.306 "The God of the Vending Machine" (自販機の神, "Jihanki no Kami"); RIDE.307 "I Am Right" (オレは正しい, "Ore wa Tadashii"); RIDE.308 "Doubashi Attacks" (銅橋、襲う, "Dōbashi, Osou"); RIDE.309 "The Strongest Legs" (最強の脚, "Saikyō no Ashi"); RIDE.310 "Sohoku's Light" (総北の光, "Sōhoku no Hikari"); RIDE.311 "Kaburagi Full Throttles" (鏑木、全開, "Kaburagi, Zenkai"); Special Story. "Mountain God's Winter Party" (特別読み切り 冬の山神パーティー, "Tokubetsu Yomikiri Fuyu no Sanshin Pātī")
37	December 8, 2014	978-4-253-22130-6	January 25, 2022	978-1-9753-3751-3
RIDE.312 "The Two Sprinters" (2人のスプリンター, "Futari no Supurintā"); RIDE.313 "Hakone Academy Moves!" (箱根学園、動く！, "Hakone gakuen, Ugoku!"); RIDE.314 "Sohoku And Hakone Academy" (総北と箱根学園, "Sōhoku to Hakone gakuen"); RIDE.315 "Trapped Sakamichi" (落ちる坂道, "Ochiru Sakamichi"); RIDE.316 "The Pressure of #1 Tag" (ゼッケン1のプレッシャー, "Zekken Ichi no Puresshā"); RIDE.317 "Inescapable Net" (抜けない包囲網, "Nukenai Hōimō"); RIDE.318 "Teshima Junta!" (手嶋純太！, "Teshima Junta!"); RIDE.319 "Sho!" (ショ！, "Sho!"); RIDE.320 "Teshima's Challenge!!" (手嶋のチャレンジ！！, "Teshima no Charenji!!")
38	February 6, 2015	978-4-253-22131-3	January 25, 2022	978-1-9753-3751-3
RIDE.321 "Message" (メッセージ, "Messēji"); RIDE.322 "Pedal, Pedal!!" (回れ、回れ！！, "Maware, Maware!!"); RIDE.323 "Kyoto Fushimi" (京都伏見, "Kyōto Fushimi"); RIDE.324 "Manami's Wings" (真波の羽根, "Manami no Hane"); RIDE.325 "Concentration" (集中力, "Shūchū-ryoku"); RIDE.326 "Sakamichi vs Kyofushi Yamaguchi" (坂道vs京伏 山口, "Sakamichi vs Kyōfushi Yamaguchi"); RIDE.327 "A Weed's Riding" (雑草の走り, "Zassō no Hashiri"); RIDE.328 "Search for A "Chance"!!" (「チャンス」をさがせ！！, "Chansu o Sagase!!")
39	April 8, 2015	978-4-253-22132-0	May 31, 2022	978-1-9753-3913-5
RIDE.329 "400m to the Line" (ラインまで400m, "Rain made Yonhyaku-mētoru"); RIDE.330 "The Two Wishes" (2つの願い, "Futatsu no Negai"); RIDE.331 "Looking Up at the Sky" (空を仰ぐ, "Sora o Aogu"); RIDE.332 "The Ones Providing Support" (支える者たち, "Sasaeru Mono-tachi"); RIDE.333 "Hakone Academy's Ace Assist" (箱根学園のエースアシスト, "Hakone gakuen no Ēsu Ashisuto"); RIDE.334 "Super Wavering Downhill!!" (スーパーピラピラダウンヒル！！, "Sūpa pirapira Daunhiru!!"); RIDE.335 "Hakone's Delivery Man" (箱根の届け屋, "Hakone no Todokeya"); RIDE.336 "Naruko, Version II" (鳴子、バージョンII, "Naruko, Bājon-Tsū"); RIDE.337 "The Two Aces!!" (2人のエース！！, "Futari no Ēsu!!")
40	June 8, 2015	978-4-253-22133-7	May 31, 2022	978-1-9753-3913-5
RIDE.338 "Overlapping Wishes!!" (重ねる願い！！, "Kasaneru Negai!!"); RIDE.339 "Near Future" (襲来, "Shūrai"); RIDE.340 "Severely Earthshaking" (激震, "Gekishin"); RIDE.341 "Spiky Bean" (マメトサカ, "Mametosaka"); RIDE.342 "Switch" (スイッチ, "Suitchi"); RIDE.343 "Getting Away!!" (逃げ切り！！, "Nigekiri!!"); RIDE.344 "Exciting Straight Line!!" (シビれる直線！！, "Shibireru Chokusen!!"); RIDE.345 "Ashikiba Takuto" (葦木場拓斗, "Ashikiba Takuto"); RIDE.346 "The Resolute Five Persons" (覚悟の5人, "Kakugo no Go-nin")
41	August 7, 2015	978-4-253-22134-4	October 4, 2022	978-1-9753-3915-9
RIDE.347 "Transformation" (変態, "Hentai"); RIDE.348 "Shaving Off 3 Seconds" (削る3秒, "Kezuru San-byō"); RIDE.349 "Goal Line!!!" (ゴールライン！！！, "Gōru Rain!!!"); RIDE.350 "The Wings of Glory" (栄光のウイング, "Eikō no Uingu"); RIDE.351 "Wavering Sohoku" (揺らぐ総北, "Yuragu Sōhoku"); RIDE.352 "Kinjou's Words" (金城の言葉, "Kinjō no Kotoba"); RIDE.353 "The Footsteps of Hope" (希望の足音, "Kibō no Ashioto"); RIDE.354 "Kyoto Fushimi's Uneasiness" (京都伏見の焦燥, "Kyōto Fushimi no Shōsō"); RIDE.355 "The Morning of the 2nd Day" (2日目の朝, "Futsuka-me no asa")
42	November 6, 2015	978-4-253-22135-1	October 4, 2022	978-1-9753-3915-9
RIDE.356 "Nickname" (アダ名, "Adana"); RIDE.357 "Second Day Starts!!" (スタートする2日目!!, "Sutāto suru Futsuka-me! !"); RIDE.358 "Sohoku Moves Forward" (進む総北, "Susumu Sōhoku"); RIDE.359 "Kaburagi's Struggle" (鏑木のあがき, "Kaburagi no Agaki"); RIDE.360 "Teshima And Onoda" (手嶋と小野田, "Teshima to Onoda"); RIDE.361 "The Final Decision" (最後の決断, "Saigo no Ketsudan"); RIDE.362 "Koga Yells!!" (叫ぶ古賀！！, "Sakebu Koga!!"); RIDE.363 "The Baton of Hope" (願いのタスキ, "Negai no Tasuki"); RIDE.364 "Two People Who Can't Advance" (進めぬ2人, "Susumenu Futari")
43	January 8, 2016	978-4-253-22703-2	March 21, 2023	978-1-9753-3917-3
RIDE.365 "Anisong" (アニソン, "Anison"); RIDE.366 "#16, Shinkai Yuuto" (16番、新開悠人, "Jūroku-ban, Shinkai Yūto"); RIDE.367 "Yes" (yes, "Ies"); RIDE.368 "Mountain King" (山王, "Sannō"); RIDE.369 "The Battle to Join Up" (合流の勝負, "Gōryū no Shōbu"); RIDE.370 "Souhoku's Three" (総北3人, "Sōhoku San-nin"); RIDE.371 "Chase After!!" (追いかける！！, "Oikakeru!!"); RIDE.372 "Correct Decision" (正しい判断, "Tadashii Handan")
44	March 8, 2016	978-4-253-22704-9	March 21, 2023	978-1-9753-3917-3
RIDE.373 "Fallen Feelings" (こぼれ落ちた想い, "Koboreochita Omoi"); RIDE.374 "Izumida VS!" (泉田VS！, "Izumida VS!"); RIDE.375 "Massager" (マッサージャー, "Massājā"); RIDE.376 "Meat Is Beautiful" (筋肉は美しい, "Kinniku wa Utsukushii"); RIDE.377 "Hakone Academy Captain, Izumida" (箱根学園キャプテン、泉田, "Hakone gakuen kyaputen, Izumida"); RIDE.378 "The Fastest Javelin" (最速の槍, "Saisoku no Yari"); RIDE.379 "Flower Field" (花畑, "Hanabatake"); RIDE.380 "Heart's Bundle" (心のつつみ, "Kokoro no Tsutsumi"); RIDE.381 "Heart's Box" (心の函, "Kokoro no Hako")
45	June 8, 2016	978-4-253-22705-6	August 22, 2023	978-1-9753-3919-7
RIDE.382 "The Kings' Resolution" (王の決意, "Ō no Ketsui"); RIDE.383 "Risk" (リスク, "Risuku"); RIDE.384 "Delightful Sprint Line" (歓喜のスプリントライン, "Kanki no Supurinto rain"); RIDE.385 "Inherited Spirit" (継承された精神, "Keishō sareta Seishin"); RIDE.386 "The Behind Sohoku" (遅れる総北, "Okureru Sōhoku"); RIDE.387 "The Two Sprinters" (2人のスプリンター, "Futari no Supurintā"); RIDE.388 "Aoyagi Hajime" (青八木 一, "Aoyagi Hajime"); RIDE.389 "Winter's Promise" (冬の約束, "Fuyu no Yakusoku")
46	September 8, 2016	978-4-253-22706-3	August 22, 2023	978-1-9753-3919-7
RIDE.390 "The Start of the Mountain" (山の始まり, "Yama no Hajimari"); RIDE.391 "Phase 28" (フェーズ 28, "Fēzu Nijūhachi"); RIDE.392 "The Fall of the Bottle" (ボトルの滝, "Botoru no Taki"); RIDE.393 ""Battle"" ("戦い", "Tatakai"); RIDE.394 "Souhoku's Orders" (東北の命令, "Tōhoku no Meirei"); RIDE.395 "Shooting Towards the Goal" (ゴールへ向けてのシューティング, "Gōru e Mukete no Shūtingu"); RIDE.396 "Kyoto Fushimi's Advance!!" (京子伏見の進歩!!, "Kyōto Fushimi no Shinpo!!"); RIDE.397 "Naruko's Willpower" (鳴子の意志, "Naruko no Ishi"); RIDE.398 "Come On!!" (いい加減にして！！, "Ii kagen ni shite!!")
47	November 8, 2016	978-4-253-22707-0	December 12, 2023	978-1-9753-3922-7
RIDE.399 "The Summit Draws Near" (サミットが近づく, "Samitto ga Chikazuku"); RIDE.400 "Onoda Sakamichi" (小野田 坂道, "Onoda Sakamichi"); RIDE.401 "Midousuji's Outcry" (御堂筋の叫び声, "Midōsuji no Sakebigoe"); RIDE.402 "Mountain Prize" (マウンテン賞, "Maunten-shō"); RIDE.403 "Towards the 2nd Day's Goal" (2日目の目標に向けて, "Futsuka-me no Mokuhyō ni Mukete"); RIDE.404 "Yuto's Confusion" (悠人の混乱, "Yūto no Konran"); RIDE.405 "Rebellion" (反乱, "Hanran"); RIDE.406 "Final Fake" (ファイナルフェイク, "Fainaru Feiku"); RIDE.407 "A Dangerous Man" (危険な男, "Kiken na Otoko")
48	January 6, 2017	978-4-253-22708-7	December 12, 2023	978-1-9753-3922-7
RIDE.408 "The Last Straight Line!!" (最後の直線!!, "Saigo no Chokusen!!"); RIDE.409 "Limiter" (制限, "Seigen"); RIDE.410 "Predator!!" (捕食者!!, "Hoshoku-sha!!"); RIDE.411 "The Summer Day" (夏の日, "Natsu no Hi"); RIDE.412 "Shinkai Yuto" (新開 悠人, "Shinkai Yūto"); RIDE.413 "The Three Strong Ones" (3人の強者, "San-nin no Tsuwamono"); RIDE.414 "The Second Day's Goal Line!!" (2日目のゴールライン!!, "Futsuka-me no Gōru Rain!!"); RIDE.415 "Winner" (勝利者, "Shōri-sha"); RIDE.416 "Podium" (表彰台, "Hyōshōdai")
49	February 8, 2017	978-4-253-22709-4	May 21, 2024	978-1-9753-3923-4
RIDE.417 "Sohoku's Dark Cloud" (総北の暗雲, "Sōhoku no An'un"); RIDE.418 "A Small Ridge" (小さな峠, "Chiisana Tōge"); RIDE.419 "Reunion" (再会, "Saikai"); RIDE.420 "The Two Climbs" (二人のクライム, "Futari no Kuraimu"); RIDE.421 "Those Who Saw the Light" (光を見た者たち, "Hikari o Mita Mono-tachi"); RIDE.422 "The Morning of Determination" (決意の朝, "Ketsui no Ssa"); RIDE.423 "Shoot Down!" (撃ち落とす！, "Uchiotosu!"); RIDE.424 "Each One's Start Line" (それぞれのスタートライン, "Sorezore no Sutāto Rain"); RIDE.425 "The Last Day Starts!!" (最終日、スタート!!, "Saishūbi, Sutāto!!")
50	April 7, 2017	978-4-253-22710-0	May 21, 2024	978-1-9753-3923-4
RIDE.426 "Beyond the Wall" (かべを越えて, "Kabe o Koete"); RIDE.427 "The Two People on the Downhill" (2人のダウンヒル, "Futari no Daunhiru"); RIDE.428 "Cooperation" (協調, "Kyōchō"); RIDE.429 "The Pack Leader" (集団のリーダー, "Shūdan no Rīdā"); RIDE.430 "Landshark" (陸鮫, "Riku same"); RIDE.431 "Two People Falling" (落ちる二人, "Ochiru Futari"); RIDE.432 "Haircut" (断髪, "Danpatsu"); RIDE.433 "Wild Cherry Blossom" (山桜, "Yamazakura"); RIDE.434 "Swallow!!" (のみ込む！！, "Nomikomu!!")
51	June 8, 2017	978-4-253-22711-7	October 1, 2024	978-1-9753-8859-1
RIDE.435 "Eight People Break Down" (崩れる8人, "Kuzureru Hachi-nin"); RIDE.436 "Strength to Move Forward Together" (共に進む力, "Tomo ni Susumu Chikara"); RIDE.437 "Team Two" (チーム2人, "Chīmu Futari"); RIDE.438 "Hiroshima's Shark" (広島の鮫, "Hiroshima no Same"); RIDE.439 "Death Game!!" (デスゲーム！！, "Desu Gēmu!!"); RIDE.440 "Teshima's Miscalculation" (手嶋の誤算, "Tejima no Gosan"); RIDE.441 "Impatient Hiroshima" (焦る広島, "Aseru Hiroshima"); RIDE.442 "Cutting Life" (削れる命, "Kezureru Inochi")
52	September 7, 2017	978-4-253-22712-4	October 1, 2024	978-1-9753-8859-1
RIDE.443 "Urakubo Yuusaku" (浦久保優策, "Urakubo Yūsaku"); RIDE.444 "Machimiya And Urakubo" (待宮と浦久保, "Machimiya to Urakubo"); RIDE.445 "Six People Fighting!!" (戦う6人！！, "Tatakau Roku-nin!!"); RIDE.446 "Aoyagi's Last Wish" (青八木、最後の望み, "Aoyagi, Saigo no Nozomi"); RIDE.447 "The Settlement on the Bridge!!" (橋の上の決着！！, "Hashi no Ue no Ketchaku!!"); RIDE.448 "The Death Game's Conclusion" (デスゲームの結末, "Desu Gēmu no Ketsumatsu"); RIDE.449 "The Strength of Six People!!" (6人の力！！, "Roku-nin no Chikara!!"); RIDE.450 "Catch Up!!" (追いつけ！！, "Oitsuke!!")
53	December 8, 2017	978-4-253-22713-1	May 6, 2025	979-8-8554-0029-8
RIDE.451 "Tears" (涙, "Namida"); RIDE.452 "Entrusted Feelings" (託した想い, "Takushita Omoi"); RIDE.453 "The Remaining 3km's Clash!!" (残り3kmの激突!!, "Nokori San-kiromētoru no Gekitotsu!!"); RIDE.454 "A Team That Supports Each Other!!" (支えあうチーム!!, "Sasaeau Chīmu!!"); RIDE.455 "The Seniors' Role" (先輩の役割, "Senpai no Yakuwari"); RIDE.456 "Doubashi Masakiyo's Inter High" (銅橋正清のインターハイ, "Dōbashi Masakiyo no Intā Hai"); RIDE.457 "The Straight Road's End" (平坦道の果て, "Heitan dō no Hate"); RIDE.458 "The Climbers Move Forward" (駆け上がるクライマー, "Kakeagaru Kuraimā")
54	January 5, 2018	978-4-253-22714-8	May 6, 2025	979-8-8554-0029-8
RIDE.459 "Fierce Attack" (猛攻, "Mōkō"); RIDE.460 "A Quiet Attack" (静かなる侵撃, "Shizuka naru Shingeki"); RIDE.461 "A Small Promise" (小さな約束, "Chiisana Yakusoku"); RIDE.462 "New Voices" (産声, "Ubugoe"); RIDE.463 "FINAL ROAD!" (FINAL ROAD!, "Fainaru Rōdo!"); RIDE.464 "Distance" (距離, "Kyori"); RIDE.465 "Sakamichi at Full Power" (全開坂道, "Zenkai Sakamichi"); RIDE.466 "Teshima's Orders" (手嶋のオーダー, "Teshima no Ōdā"); RIDE.467 "Sohoku's Flag" (総北の旗, "Sōhoku no Hata")
55	March 8, 2018	978-4-253-22715-5	December 2, 2025	979-8-8554-0278-0
RIDE.468 "Reaching Vibrations" (届いた震動, "Todoita Shindō"); RIDE.469 "The Two People in the Lead!!" (先頭の2人!!, "Sentō no Futari!!"); RIDE.470 "The Star of Minami Middle School" (南中の星, "Minami-chū no Hoshi"); RIDE.471 "Transfer Student" (転校生, "Tenkō-sei"); RIDE.472 "Two People's Mountain Prize" (ふたりの山岳賞, "Futari no Sangaku-shō"); RIDE.473 "Freezing Rain" (つめたい雨, "Tsumetai Ame"); RIDE.474 "Echoing Vibrations" (響きあう震動, "Hibikiau Shindō"); RIDE.475 "The Remaining 1.5km of Offense And Defense!" (のこり1.5kmの攻防！, "Nokori Ittengo-kiromētoru no Kōbō！"); RIDE.476 "Great Cheering" (大声援, "Dai-Seien")
56	May 8, 2018	978-4-253-22716-2	December 2, 2025	979-8-8554-0278-0
RIDE.477 "Believe in Yourself!!" (自分を信じる!!, "Jibun o Shinjiru!!"); RIDE.478 "That Winter's Incident" (あの冬の出来事, "Ano Fuyu no Dekigoto"); RIDE.479 "The Wall Between Two People" (2人の壁, "Futari no Kabe"); RIDE.480 "Looking Up at the Sky" (仰ぎ見た空, "Aogimita Sora"); RIDE.481 "The Final Handshake" (決着の握手, "Ketchaku no Akushu"); RIDE.482 "Sohoku's Miracle" (総北のキセキ, "Sōhoku no Kiseki"); RIDE.483 "Start Moving!!" (動き出す!!, "Ugokidasu!!"); RIDE.484 "Attack!!" (来襲!!, "Raishū!!")
57	August 8, 2018	978-4-253-22717-9	September 22, 2026	979-8-8554-0279-7
RIDE.485 "The Last Eight People" (最後の8人, "Saigo no Hachi-nin"); RIDE.486 "Shinkai Yuto's Resolution" (新開悠人の覚悟, "Shinkai Yūto no Kakugo"); RIDE.487 "Adversity" (逆境, "Gyakkyō"); RIDE.488 "The Final Muscles" (最後の筋肉, "Saigo no Kinniku"); RIDE.489 "Naruko VS Manami" (鳴子 VS 真波, "Naruko VS Manami"); RIDE.490 "Naruko! Close Battle" (鳴子！ギリギリバトル, "Naruko! girigiri Batoru"); RIDE.491 "The Bet Winner!!" (賭けの勝者!!, "Kake no Shōsha!!"); RIDE.492 "The Leading Three!!!" (先頭の3人!!!, "Sentō no San-nin!!!"); RIDE.493 "The Remaining 7m of Tension" (残り7kmの緊迫, "Nokori Nana-kiromētoru no Kinpaku")
58	October 5, 2018	978-4-253-22718-6	September 22, 2026	979-8-8554-0279-7
RIDE.494 "Offense and Defense! Downhill!!" (攻防！ダウンヒル!!, "Kōbō! Daunhiru!!"); RIDE.495 "Prey" (捕食, "Hoshoku"); RIDE.496 "200m Taken Away" (奪われた200m, "Ubawareta Nihyaku-mētoru"); RIDE.497 "Naruko Express!!" (鳴子特急!!, "Naruko Tokkyū!!"); RIDE.498 "The Last Thread" (最後の糸, "Saigo no Ito"); RIDE.499 "Throw Away Everything" (全てを捨てて, "Subete o Sutete"); RIDE.500 "Naruko Shoukichi" (鳴子章吉, "Naruko Shōkichi"); RIDE.501 "Those Who Aim for the Goal" (ゴールを目指す者たち, "Gōru o Mezasu Mono-tachi"); RIDE.502 "Midousuji VS Imaizumi" (御堂筋 VS 今泉, "Midōsuji VS Imaizumi")
59	January 8, 2019	978-4-253-22719-3	—	—
RIDE.503 "Growing" (成長, "Seichō"); RIDE.504 "The Wind Changes" (変わる風向き, "Kawaru Kazamuki"); RIDE.505 "The Rainy Downhill" (雨の下り!!, "Ame no Kudari!!"); RIDE.506 "Imaizumi's Wish" (今泉の願い, "Imaizumi no Negai"); RIDE.507 "Watergate Dive!!" (ウォーターゲートダイブ!!, "Wōtā Gēto Daibu!!"); RIDE.508 "Breakthrough!!" (突破!!, "Toppa!!"); RIDE.509 "The Ace's Value" (エースの価値, "Ēsu no Kachi"); RIDE.510 "Conscience" (良心, "Ryōshin"); RIDE.511 "The End of the Battle" (戦いの果て, "Tatakai no Hate")
60	March 8, 2019	978-4-253-22720-9	—	—
RIDE.512 "High Expectations!!" (高まる期待!!, "Takamaru Kitai!!"); RIDE.513 "Assault" (強襲, "Kyōshū"); RIDE.514 "Sohoku, the Last Order" (総北、最後のオーダー, "Sōhoku, Saigo no Ōdā"); RIDE.515 "2m to Start" (始まるまでの2m, "Hajimaru made no Ni-mētoru"); RIDE.516 "That Time's Promise" (あの時の約束, "Ano Toki no Yakusoku"); RIDE.517 "Aquarium in May" (5月の水族館, "Go-gatsu no Suizokukan"); RIDE.518 "Pounding Hearts" (高鳴る胸, "Takanaru Mune"); RIDE.519 "The Senior Gaze" (先輩のまなざし, "Senpai no Manazashi")
61	May 8, 2019	978-4-253-22721-6	—	—
RIDE.520 "2000m Elevation" (標高2000m, "Hyōkō Nisen-mētoru"); RIDE.521 "What Manami Saw" (真波が見たもの, "Manami ga Mita Mono"); RIDE.522 "Kuroda Yukinari" (黒田雪成, "Kuroda Yukinari"); RIDE.523 "Switch!!" (スイッチ!!, "Suitchi!!"); RIDE.524 "Manami Flies" (真波、飛ぶ, "Manami, Tobu"); RIDE.525 "Humming" (ハナウタ, "Hanauta"); RIDE.526 "A Small Reunion" (小さな再会, "Chiisana saikai"); RIDE.527 "The Last Year Summer" (1年前の夏, "Ichi-nen-mae no Natsu")
62	July 8, 2019	978-4-253-22722-3	—	—
RIDE.528 "What the Class Rep Heard" (委員長が聞いたもの, "Iinchō ga Kiita mono"); RIDE.529 "Voice Reaches" (声、届け, "Koe, Todoke"); RIDE.530 "Qualification to Fight" (闘う資格, "Tatakau Shikaku"); RIDE.531 "The Last Year's Onoda" (この1年の小野田, "Kono Ichi-nen no Onoda"); RIDE.532 "Kinjou's Last Job" (金城、最後の仕事, "Kinjō, Saigo no Shigoto"); RIDE.533 "Demodulation" (復調, "Fukuchō"); RIDE.534 "The Seniors' Yell" (先輩からのエール, "Senpai kara no Ēru"); RIDE.535 "The Back You Wanted to Surpass" (超えたい背中, "Koetai Senaka")
63	September 6, 2019	978-4-253-22723-0	—	—
RIDE.536 "The Last 300m" (最後の300m, "Saigo no Sanbyaku-mētoru"); RIDE.537 "One-on-One Fight" (一騎打ち, "Ikkiuchi"); RIDE.538 "Slope" (勾配, "Kōbai"); RIDE.539 "Two People's Last Sprint" (2人のラストスプリント, "Futari no Rasuto Supurinto"); RIDE.540 "The One Who Raised His Hand to the Sky" (大空に手を挙げた者, "Ōzora ni Te o Ageta Mono"); RIDE.541 "The End of a Long Battle" (長い闘いの終わり, "Nagai Tatakai no Owari"); RIDE.542 "After the Goal" (After the Goal, "Afutā za Gōru"); RIDE.543 "The 15cm Podium" (15cmの表彰台, "Jūgo-senchimētoru no Hyōshōdai"); RIDE.544 "Individual Awards" (それぞれの表彰, "Sorezore no Hyōshō")
64	November 8, 2019	978-4-253-22724-7	—	—
RIDE.545 "The Second Year's Inter High Special Stage" (2年目のIHスペシャルステージ, "Ni-nen-me no IH supesharu sutēji"); RIDE.546 "The Summer Break of Onoda Sakamichi" (小野田坂道の夏休み, "Onoda Sakamichi no Natsuyasumi"); RIDE.547 "The Summer Break Meeting" (夏休みの出会い, "Natsuyasumi no Deai"); RIDE.548 "The Challenge of Sakamichi" (坂道のチャレンジ, "Sakamichi no Charenji"); RIDE.549 "Spare Bike" (スペアバイク, "Supea Baiku"); RIDE.550 "Mountain Bike" (マウンテンバイク, "Maunten Baiku"); RIDE.551 "Gear Change" (ギア・チェンジ, "Gia Chenji"); RIDE.552 "Rising the Cadence Speed" (上がる回転数, "Agaru Kaitensū"); RIDE.553 "The Potential of the Mountain Bike" (MTBの可能性, "MTB no Kanōsei")
65	February 7, 2020	978-4-253-22725-4	—	—
RIDE.554 "To Minegayama's Old Road Summit" (峰ケ山旧道の山頂へ, "Minegayama Kyūdō no Sanchō e"); RIDE.555 "Sakamichi Thinking" (思い返す坂道, "Omoikaesu Sakamichi"); RIDE.556 "One More Challenge" (もう1つのチャレンジ, "Mō Hitotsu no Charenji"); RIDE.557 "My Mamachari" (ボクのママチャリ, "Boku no Mamachari"); RIDE.558 "The Place You Want to Go" (行きたい場所, "Ikitai Basho"); RIDE.559 "People Who Fight With Mountain Bikes" (MTBを闘う人たち, "MTB o Tatakau Hito-tachi"); RIDE.560 "Mountain Bike Race! Start!!" (MTBレース! スタート!!, "MTB Rēsu! Sutāto!!"); RIDE.561 "Yoshimaru in the Lead!!" (吉丸、先行!!, "Yoshimaru, Senkō!!")
66	April 8, 2020	978-4-253-22726-1	—	—
RIDE.562 "Two People Who Do Not Yield" (譲らない2人, "Yuzuranai Futari"); RIDE.563 "Kiji Kyuui" (雉弓射, "Kiji Kyūi"); RIDE.564 "The Emperor Attacks" (しかける皇帝, "Shikakeru Kōtei"); RIDE.565 "The Title of "Top"" (トップの称号, "Toppu no Shōgō"); RIDE.566 "Chase!!" (チェイス!!, "Cheisu!!"); RIDE.567 "Connected Feelings" (つなげた思い, "Tsunageta Omoi"); RIDE.568 "Yoshimaru Accelerates!!" (加速する吉丸!!, "Kasoku suru Yoshimaru!!"); RIDE.569 "Panic And Smile" (焦りと笑み, "Aseri to Emi")
67	May 8, 2020	978-4-253-22727-8	—	—
RIDE.570 "The Legendary Race" (伝説のレース, "Densetsu no Rēsu"); RIDE.571 "The Last Gear" (最後のギア, "Saigo no Gia"); RIDE.572 "The Resolution of Two People" (2人の覚悟, "Futari no Kakugo"); RIDE.573 "Don't Underestimate Me!!" (ナメんな!!, "Namen na!!"); RIDE.574 "Tense Atmosphere" (張りつめる空気, "Haritsumeru Kūki"); RIDE.575 "The Performance of Kiji!!" (雉の実行!!, "Kiji no Jikkō!!"); RIDE.576 "LAST STRAIGHT" (LAST STRAIGHT, "Rasuto Sutorēto"); RIDE.577 "The Victory of One Person" (1人の照射, "Hitori no Shōsha"); RIDE.578 "Conclusion And Tears" (決着と涙, "Ketchaku to Namida")
68	August 6, 2020	978-4-253-22728-5	—	—
RIDE.579 "The First Mountain Bike Race!!" (初めてのMTBレース!!, "Hajimete no MTB Rēsu!!"); RIDE.580 "Hard Tail!!" (ハードテイル!!, "Hādo Teiru!!"); RIDE.581 "The Differences Between Mountain Bike And Road" (MTBとロードの違い, "MTB to Rōdo no Chigai"); RIDE.582 "Surpassing" (追い抜き, "Oinuki"); RIDE.583 "Breakthrough Power!!" (突破力!!, "Toppa-ryoku!!"); RIDE.584 "Use Your Legs!!" (脚を使え!!, "Ashi o Tsukae!!"); RIDE.585 "Naruko's Summer!" (鳴子の夏！, "Naruko no Natsu!"); RIDE.586 "A Bit of Courage" (小さな勇気, "Chiisana Yūki"); RIDE.587 "The Fruit of Victory" (勝利の果実, "Shōri no Kajitsu")
69	October 8, 2020	978-4-253-22729-2	—	—
RIDE.588 "Course Tape Kiss" (コーステープキッス!!, "Kōsu Tepu Kissu!!"); RIDE.589 "Nothing" (「何もない」, "Nan mo Nai"); RIDE.590 "Sing the Song" (歌をうたって, "Uta o Utatte"); RIDE.591 "Kiji's Mountain Bike" (雉のMTB(ﾏｳﾝﾃﾝﾊﾞｲｸ), "Kiji no MTB (Maunten baiku)"); RIDE.592 "The Confrontation of Two People" (2人の対峙, "Futari no Taiji"); RIDE.593 "Offense and Defense!" (攻防!!, "Kōbō!!"); RIDE.594 "Ichifuji Yells" (壱藤、吠える！, "Ichifuji, Hoeru!"); RIDE.595 "Enough Seconds" (十分な秒差(ﾏｰｼﾞﾝ), "Jūbun na Byōsa (Mājin)")
70	December 8, 2020	978-4-253-22730-8	—	—
RIDE.596 "The Last Section" (最後のセクション, "Saigo no Sekushon"); RIDE.597 "The Unnamed Area" (名前のないエリア, "Namae no nai Eria"); RIDE.598 "Two People Visible From the Goal!!" (ゴールから見える2人!!, "Gōru kara Mieru Futari!!"); RIDE.599 "The 30m Difference" (30m差!!, "Sanjū-metoru-sa!!"); RIDE.600 "Wheels Diving Into the Goal!!" (ゴールへ飛び込む車輪!!, "Gōru e Tobikomu Sharin!!"); RIDE.601 "Looking Up at the Blue Sky" (見上げる青空, "Miageru Aozora"); RIDE.602 "Each One's Road" (それぞれの道へ, "Sorezore no Michi e"); RIDE.603 "A New Start!!" (新しいスタート!!, "Atarashii Sutāto!!")
71	February 8, 2021	978-4-253-22731-5	—	—
RIDE.604 "A Ray of Light" (一筋の光, "Hitosuji no Hikari"); RIDE.605 "New Captain!!" (新キャプテン!!, "Shin Kyaputen!!"); RIDE.606 "Sohoku's Third Generation" (第三世代総北, "Dai-San-Sedai Sōhoku"); RIDE.607 "The First Day Of Practice!!" (練習初日!!, "Renshū Shonichi!!"); RIDE.608 "The Start Of The New Hakone Academy!!" (新箱根学園始動!!, "Shin Hakone Gakuen Shidō!!"); RIDE.609 "Those Who Inherited" (受け継いだ者たち, "Uketsuida Mono-tachi"); RIDE.610 "The Two Lights" (ふたつの光, "Futatsu no Hikari"); RIDE.611 "Towards The Team's First Battle!!" (チーム初戦へ!!, "Chīmu Shosen E!!")
72	May 7, 2021	978-4-253-22731-5	—	—
RIDE.612 "Danchiku Ryuuhou" (段竹竜包, "Danchiku Ryūhō"); RIDE.613 "The Two People Of Hakone Academy" (箱根学園の2人!!, "Hakone Gakuen no Futari!!"); RIDE.614 "The Start Of Determination!!" (決意のスタート!!, "Ketsui no Sutāto!!"); RIDE.615 "Hornet" (ホーネット, "Hōnetto"); RIDE.616 "Hakogaku, Invasion" (ハコガク、襲来, "Hakogaku, Shūrai"); RIDE.617 "The Weightless Weapon" (重さのない武器, "Omo-Sa no nai Buki"); RIDE.618 "Takadajou's Bait" (高田城の挑発, "Takadajou no Chōhatsu"); RIDE.619 "The Zigzag Battle Starts!!" (つづらバトル スタート!!, "Tsudzura Batoru Sutāto!!")
73	July 8, 2021	978-4-253-22733-9	—	—
RIDE.620 "Targeted Prey" (狙われた獲物, "Nerawa Reta Emono"); RIDE.621 "Quiz" (クイズ, "Kuizu"); RIDE.622 "Kaburagi Protects!" (守る、鏑木!, "Mamoru, Kaburagi!"); RIDE.623 "Takadajou's Proof" (高田城の証明, "Takadajō no Shōmei"); RIDE.624 "The Roaring Sprint" (咆哮のスプリント, "Hōkō No Supurinto"); RIDE.625 "Knights and King" (騎士と王, "Kishi to Ō"); RIDE.626 "Hornet" (スズメバチ, "Suzumebachi"); RIDE.627 "The Full Throttle Onoda Sakamichi!!" (全開の小野田坂道!!, "Zenkai no Onoda Sakamichi!!")
74	September 8, 2021	978-4-253-22734-6	—	—
RIDE.628 "Running Solo Among The Screams!!" (悲鳴の中の独走!!, "Himei no Naka no Dokusō!!"); RIDE.629 ""Pride" and "Plan"" (「プライド」と「策」, ""Puraido" to "Saku""); RIDE.630 "The Final Countdown" (最後のカウントダウン, "Saigo no Kauntodaun"); RIDE.631 "Danchiku Howls!!" (段竹、吠える!!, "Danchiku, Hoeru!!"); RIDE.632 "Wish Upon A Star" (星に願いを, "Hoshininegaiwo"); RIDE.633 "After Crossing The Goal Line" (ゴールラインを越えたあと, "Gōrurain O Koeta Ato"); RIDE.634 "Midousuji and The Road" (御堂筋と道, "Midōsuji to Michi"); RIDE.635 "Charisma" (カリスマ, "Karisuma"); RIDE.636 "That Day's Three People" (あの日の3人, "Ano Ni~Tsu No 3-Nen")
75	December 8, 2021	978-4-253-22735-3	—	—
RIDE.637 "A New Distortion" (新たな歪み, "Aratana Yugami"); RIDE.638 "Ambition" (野心, "Yashin"); RIDE.639 "Weed" (雑草, "Zassō"); RIDE.640 "The First Years' Race Two Years Ago" (2年前の1年生レース, "2-Nen Mae No 1-Nensei Rēsu"); RIDE.641 "A Battle Of Wills!!" (ぶつかる意思！！, "Butsukaru Ishi!!"); RIDE.642 "Motomineyama's Last 1km!!" (本峰山、最後の1km!!, "Motomineyama, Saigo No 1km!!"); RIDE.643 "The Grating Finish Line!!" (グレーチングのフィニッシュライン!!, "Gurēchingu No Finisshurain!!"); RIDE.644 "Victory And Sweat" (勝ちと汗, "Kachi to han"); RIDE.645 "Supremacy" (優越, "Yūetsu")
76	February 8, 2022	978-4-253-22736-0	—	—
RIDE.646 "Cycling" (サイクリング, "Saikuringu"); RIDE.647 "Handicap Battle" (ハンデ戦, "Hande-Sen"); RIDE.648 "Kawada's Words" (川田の言葉, "Kawada no Kotoba"); RIDE.649 "The Biting Backpack" (喰い込むリュック, "Kui Komu Ryukku"); RIDE.650 "Dangerous Downhill!!" (危ない下り！！, "Abunai Kudari!!"); RIDE.651 "Two People Who Know The Inter High" (インターハイを知る２人, "Intāhai O Shiru 2-Nen"); RIDE.652 "Panicking Kawada" (焦る、川田, "Aseru, Kawada"); RIDE.653 ""Victory" Or "Defeat"" (「勝ち」か「負け」, ""Kachi" Ka "Make"")
77	April 7, 2022	978-4-253-22737-7	—	—
RIDE.654 "Longing" (憧れ, "Akogare"); RIDE.655 "Kawada Takuya" (川田 拓也, "Kawada Takuya"); RIDE.656 "The Fall Visitor" (秋の来訪者, "Aki No Raihō-Sha"); RIDE.657 "The First Road Bike" (初めてのロードバイク, "Hajimete No Rōdobaiku"); RIDE.658 "Cafe Battle!!" (カフェバトル!!, "Kafe batoru!!"); RIDE.659 "Full Throttle VS Full Throttle!!" (全開VS全開!!, "Zenkai VS Zenkai!!"); RIDE.660 "Creampuffs And Coffee Time" (シュークリームとカフェタイム, "Shūkurīmu to Kafe Taimu"); RIDE.661 "POSSIBLE" (POSSIBLE, "POSSIBLE"); RIDE.662 "Hakone Academy's Farewell Race!" (箱根学園追い出しレース!, "Hakone Gakuen Oidashi Rēsu!")
78	June 8, 2022	978-4-253-22738-4	—	—
RIDE.663 "What Manami Prepared" (真波が準備したもの, "Manami ga Junbi Shita Mono"); RIDE.664 "The Fastest Two!!" (最速の2人！！, "Saisoku no 2-Nin!!"); RIDE.665 "Yuto Attacks" (悠人、出撃, "Yūto, Shutsugeki"); RIDE.666 "Bakyun" (バキューン, "Bakyūn"); RIDE.667 "Shinkai Brothers" (新開兄弟, "Shinkai Kyōdai"); RIDE.668 "Update" (刷新, "Sasshin"); RIDE.669 "Izumida and the Others Join Up!!" (泉田たちの合流!!, "Izumida-Tachi no Gōryū!!"); RIDE.670 "The Festival Day" (祭の日, "Matsuri no Hi"); RIDE.670.5 "Mr. Nogawa Will Help!" (野川さん見立てます！, "Nogawa-san Mitatemasu!")
79	August 8, 2022	978-4-253-22739-1	—	—
RIDE.671 "The Greatest Enemy" (最大の敵, "Saidai no Teki"); RIDE.672 "The Two Demons" (２人の鬼, "2-Nin no Oni"); RIDE.673 "The Brothers' Conclusion" (兄弟の決着, "Kyōdai no Ketchaku"); RIDE.674 "Hayato and Yuto" (隼人と悠人, "Hayato to Yūto"); RIDE.675 "On the Mountain, Once Again!!" (山で、再び!!, "Yama de, Futatabi!!"); RIDE.676 "Summer's Kumotarou 1" (夏のくも太郎１, "Natsu no Kumotarō 1"); RIDE.677 "Summer's Kumotarou 2" (夏のくも太郎２, "Natsu no Kumotarō 2"); RIDE.678 "Summer's Kumotarou 3" (夏のくも太郎３, "Natsu no Kumotarō 3")
80	October 6, 2022	978-4-253-22740-7	—	—
RIDE.679 "Wings and Cat-Legs" (羽根と猫足, "Hane to Nekoashi"); RIDE.680 "Kuroda's Three Years" (黒田の３年間, "Kuroda no 3-Nenkan"); RIDE.681 "The Remaining Distance" (残りの距離, "Nokori no Kyori"); RIDE.682 "Smiling Manami" (笑う真波, "Warau Manami"); RIDE.683 "The Last Cat-Legs" (最後の猫足, "Saigo no Nekoashi"); RIDE.684 "Ace and Assist" (エースとアシスト, "Ēsu to Ashisuto"); RIDE.685 "Synchronising Breathing" (息を合わせる, "Ikiwoawaseru"); RIDE.686 "2m2cm!!" (2m2cm!!, "2m2cm!!"); RIDE.686.5 "Mr. Nogawa Remembers" (野川さんが思い出す, "Nogawa-san ga omoidasu")
81	November 8, 2022	978-4-253-28251-2	—	—
RIDE.687 "Yuto and Ashikiba" (悠人と葦木場, "Yūto to Ashikiba"); RIDE.688 "Conclusion and Start!!" (決着と始動!!, "Ketchaku to Shidō!!"); RIDE.689 "The One Year Older Seniors" (一つ上の先輩, "Hitotsu-jō no Senpai"); RIDE.690 "The Way Home from the Graduation Ceremony" (卒業式の帰り道, "Sotsugyōshiki no Kaerimichi"); RIDE.691 "Sakamichi's Third Year Start!!!" (坂道３年目スタート!!!, "Sakamichi 3-nen-me Sutāto!!!"); RIDE.692 "The Freshmen from the Back Gate's Hill!" (裏門坂の新入生！, "Uramonzaka no Shin'nyūsei!"); RIDE.693 "Looking for "God"" (「神」を探して, ""Kami" o Sagashite"); RIDE.694 "Joining the New Club-Teh!!" (入部するっテ!!, "Nyūbu Suru Tte!!")
82	February 8, 2023	978-4-253-28252-9	—	—
RIDE.695 "New Possibilities" (新しい可能性, "Atarashī Kanōsei"); RIDE.696 "The Third First-Years' Race!!!" (３あ度目の１年生レース!!!, "3 A-Dome no 1-Nensei Rēsu!!!"); RIDE.697 "Rokudai's Goal" (六代の目標, "Rokudai no Mokuhyō"); RIDE.698 "Lifeline" ("生命線", "Seimei-sen"); RIDE.699 "Catching Up!!" (追いついてきた！！, "Oitsuite kita!!"); RIDE.700 "Piled Up Things" (積み重ねてきたもの, "Tsumikasanete Kita Mono"); RIDE.701 "Rokudai Catches Up!!" (六代、合流!!, "Rokudai Catches Up!!"); RIDE.702 "What Onoda Sakamichi Saw" (小野田坂道が見たもの, "Onoda Sakamichi Ga Mita Mono")
83	April 7, 2023	978-4-253-28253-6	—	—
RIDE.703 "The Third Years' Gaze" (３年生のまなざし, "3-Nensei no Manazashi"); RIDE.704 "Kei and Kyo!!" (ケイちゃんと恭ちゃん!!, "Kei-chan to Kyō-chan!!"); RIDE.705 "Kinaka VS Rokudai!!" (木中vs六代!!, "Kinaka VS Rokudai!!"); RIDE.706 "Kinaka Tsugunao" (木中次直, "Kinaka Tsugunao"); RIDE.707 "Rokudai's "Promise"" (六代の「約束」, "Rokudai no "Yakusoku""); RIDE.708 "The Resolution From Now On!!" (ここから先の決意‼, "Koko Kara Saki no Ketsui‼"); RIDE.709 "The Mountain's Summit" (山の頂, "Yama no Itadaki"); RIDE.710 "Support, Sakamichi" (支える坂道, "Sasaeru Sakamichi"); RIDE.711 "New Bike!" (新しいバイク！, "Atarashī Baiku!")
84	June 8, 2023	978-4-253-28254-3	—	—
85	August 8, 2023	978-4-253-28255-0	—	—
86	October 6, 2023	978-4-253-28256-7	—	—
87	January 5, 2024	978-4-253-28257-4	—	—
88	March 7, 2024	978-4-253-28258-1	—	—
89	May 8, 2024	978-4-253-28259-8	—	—
90	July 8, 2024	978-4-253-28260-4	—	—
91	September 6, 2024	978-4-253-28261-1	—	—
92	November 8, 2024	978-4-253-28262-8	—	—
93	January 8, 2025	978-4-253-28263-5; 978-4-253-28264-2 (SE)	—	—
94	March 7, 2025	978-4-253-28265-9	—	—
95	May 8, 2025	978-4-253-28267-3; 978-4-253-28266-6 (SE)	—	—
96	July 8, 2025	978-4-253-28268-0	—	—
97	October 8, 2025	978-4-253-00442-8; 978-4-253-00443-5 (SE)	—	—
98	January 8, 2026	978-4-253-00969-0	—	—
99	March 6, 2026	978-4-253-01195-2; 978-4-253-01196-9 (SE)	—	—
100	May 8, 2026	978-4-253-01333-8	—	—
101	July 8, 2026	978-4-253-01791-6; 978-4-253-01792-3 (SE)	—	—

== Yowamushi Pedal: Spare Bike volumes ==
First spin-off series written and illustrated by Wataru Watanabe. The series have started at 2012 and still ongoing. First it was serialized in Weekly Shōnen Champion magazine but later it was moved to Bessatsu Shōnen Champion. As of August 2026 the chapters have collected into 16 tankōbon (books). The series is present various side stories of the main characters. The chapter numbering starts with "SPARE." followed by the chapter number.

No.	Release date	ISBN
1	December 8, 2014	978-4-253-22471-0
SPARE.1 "Makishima Yusuke 1" (巻島裕介 1, "Makishima Yūsuke 1"); SPARE.2 "Makishima Yusuke 2" (巻島裕介 2, "Makishima Yūsuke 2"); SPARE.3 "Makishima Yusuke 3" (巻島裕介 3, "Makishima Yūsuke 3"); SPARE.4 "Makishima Yusuke 4" (巻島裕介 4, "Makishima Yūsuke 4"); SPARE.5 "Shinkai Hayato 1" (新開隼人 1, "Shinkai Hayato 1"); SPARE.6 "Shinkai Hayato 2" (新開隼人 2, "Shinkai Hayato 2"); SPARE.12 "Toudou Jinpachi 1" (東堂尽八 1, "Tōdō Jinpachi 1"); SPARE.13 "Toudou Jinpachi 2" (東堂尽八 2, "Tōdō Jinpachi 2"); SPARE.14 "Toudou Jinpachi 3" (東堂尽八 3, "Tōdō Jinpachi 3"); SPARE.15 "Toudou Jinpachi 4" (東堂尽八 4, "Tōdō Jinpachi 4")
2	January 8, 2016	978-4-253-22472-7
SPARE.7 "Arakita Yasutomo 1" (荒北靖友 1, "Arakita Yasutomo 1"); SPARE.8 "Arakita Yasutomo 2" (荒北靖友 2, "Arakita Yasutomo 2"); SPARE.9 "Arakita Yasutomo 3" (荒北靖友 3, "Arakita Yasutomo 3"); SPARE.10 "Arakita Yasutomo 4" (荒北靖友 4, "Arakita Yasutomo 4"); SPARE.24 "Kinjou Shingo 0" (金城真護 0, "Kinjō Shingo 0"); SPARE.25 "Kinjou Shingo 1" (金城真護 1, "Kinjō Shingo 1"); SPARE.26 "Kinjou Shingo 2" (金城真護 2, "Kinjō Shingo 2"); SPARE.27 "Kinjou Shingo 3" (金城真護 3, "Kinjō Shingo 3"); SPARE.28 "Kinjou Shingo 4" (金城真護 4, "Kinjō Shingo 4"); SPARE.29 "Kinjou Shingo 5" (金城真護 5, "Kinjō Shingo 5"); SPARE.30 "Kinjou Shingo Epilogue" (金城真護エピローグ, "Kinjō Shingo Epirōgu"); SPARE.31 "Let's Go Koseki" (それいけ小関さん, "Sore Ike Koseki-san")
3	September 8, 2016	978-4-253-22473-4
SPARE.32 "Ishigaki Koutarou 0" (石垣光太郎 0, "Ishigaki Kōtarō 0"); SPARE.33 "Ishigaki Koutarou 1" (石垣光太郎 1, "Ishigaki Kōtarō 1"); SPARE.34 "Ishigaki Koutarou 2" (石垣光太郎 2, "Ishigaki Kōtarō 2"); SPARE.35 "Ishigaki Koutarou 3" (石垣光太郎 3, "Ishigaki Kōtarō 3"); SPARE.36 "Ishigaki Koutarou 4" (石垣光太郎 4, "Ishigaki Kōtarō 4"); SPARE.37 "Ishigaki Koutarou 5" (石垣光太郎 5, "Ishigaki Kōtarō 5"); SPARE.38 "Ishigaki Koutarou 6" (石垣光太郎 6, "Ishigaki Kōtarō 6"); SPARE.39 "Ishigaki Koutarou 7" (石垣光太郎 7, "Ishigaki Kōtarō 7"); SPARE.40 "Ishigaki Koutarou Epilogue" (石垣光太郎エピローグ, "Ishigaki Kōtarō epirōgu"); SPARE.EXTRA "Let's Go Arakita 1" (それいけアラキタくん 1, "Sore Ike Arakita-kun 1"); SPARE.EXTRA "Let's Go Arakita 2" (それいけアラキタくん 2, "Sore Ike Arakita-kun 2"); SPARE.EXTRA "Let's Go Arakita 3" (それいけアラキタくん 3, "Sore Ike Arakita-kun 3"); SPARE.EXTRA "Let's Go Arakita 4" (それいけアラキタくん 4, "Sore Ike Arakita-kun 4"); SPARE.EXTRA "Let's Go Ihara" (それいけイハラくん, "Sore Ike Ihara-kun")
4	January 5, 2018	978-4-253-22474-1
SPARE.43 "Machimiya Eikichi 0" (待宮栄吉 0, "Machimiya Eikichi 0"); SPARE.44 "Machimiya Eikichi 1" (待宮栄吉 1, "Machimiya Eikichi 1"); SPARE.45 "Machimiya Eikichi 2" (待宮栄吉 2, "Machimiya Eikichi 2"); SPARE.46 "Machimiya Eikichi 3" (待宮栄吉 3, "Machimiya Eikichi 3"); SPARE.47 "Machimiya Eikichi 4" (待宮栄吉 4, "Machimiya Eikichi 4"); SPARE.48 "Machimiya Eikichi 5" (待宮栄吉 5, "Machimiya Eikichi 5"); SPARE.49 "Machimiya Eikichi 6" (待宮栄吉 6, "Machimiya Eikichi 6"); SPARE.50 "Machimiya Eikichi 7" (待宮栄吉 7, "Machimiya Eikichi 7"); SPARE.51 "Machimiya Eikichi Epilogue 1" (待宮栄吉エピローグ 1, "Machimiya Eikichi epirōgu 1"); SPARE.11 "Sohoku High School" (総北高校, "Sōhoku kōkō"); SPARE.16 "Hakone Academy" (箱根学園, "Hakone gakuen"); SPARE.17 "Kyoto Fushimi Senior High School" (京都伏見高等学校, "Kyōto Fushimi kōtō gakkō")
5	March 8, 2019	978-4-253-22475-8
SPARE.52 "Machimiya Eikichi Epilogue 2" (待宮栄吉エピローグ 2, "Machimiya Eikichi epirōgu 2"); SPARE.53 "Machimiya Eikichi Epilogue 3" (待宮栄吉エピローグ 3, "Machimiya Eikichi epirōgu 3"); SPARE.54 "Turn Around Kana!" (ふりきれカナさん!, "Furikire Kana-san!"); SPARE.18 "Makishima Yusuke 5" (巻島裕介 5, "Makishima Yūsuke 5"); SPARE.19 "Makishima Yusuke 6" (巻島裕介 6, "Makishima Yūsuke 6"); SPARE.20 "Makishima Yusuke 7" (巻島裕介 7, "Makishima Yūsuke 7"); SPARE.21 "Makishima Yusuke 8" (巻島裕介 8, "Makishima Yūsuke 8"); SPARE.EXTRA "Let's Go Arakita 5" (それいけアラキタくん 5, "Sore Ike Arakita-kun 5"); SPARE.EXTRA "Let's Go Arakita 6" (それいけアラキタくん 6, "Sore Ike Arakita-kun 6"); SPARE.42 "Let's Go Ihara 2" (それいけイハラくん 2, "Sore Ike Ihara-kun 2"); SPARE.22 "Hiroshima Kureminami Technical School" (広島呉南工業, "Hiroshima Kureminami kōgyō"); SPARE.23 "Kumamoto Daiichi Senior High School" (熊本台一高等学校, "Kumamoto Daiichi kōtō gakkō"); SPARE.41 "Yonan University 0" (洋南大学 0, "Yōnan daigaku 0")
6	November 8, 2019	978-4-253-22476-5
SPARE.55 "Tadokoro Jin 0" (田所迅 0, "Tadokoro Jin 0"); SPARE.56 "Tadokoro Jin 1" (田所迅 1, "Tadokoro Jin 1"); SPARE.57 "Tadokoro Jin 2" (田所迅 2, "Tadokoro Jin 2"); SPARE.58 "Tadokoro Jin 3" (田所迅 3, "Tadokoro Jin 3"); SPARE.59 "Tadokoro Jin 4" (田所迅 4, "Tadokoro Jin 4"); SPARE.60 "Tadokoro Jin 5" (田所迅 5, "Tadokoro Jin 5"); SPARE.61 "Tadokoro Jin 6" (田所迅 6, "Tadokoro Jin 6"); SPARE.62 "Tadokoro Jin 7" (田所迅 7, "Tadokoro Jin 7"); SPARE.63 "Tadokoro Jin 8" (田所迅 8, "Tadokoro Jin 8"); SPARE.64 "Tadokoro Jin 9" (田所迅 9, "Tadokoro Jin 9"); SPARE.65 "Tadokoro Jin Epilogue" (田所迅エピローグ, "Tadokoro Jin epirōgu"); SPARE.66 "Hungry Tadokoro" (腹ぺこ田所くん, "Harapeko Tadokoro-kun"); SPARE.EXTRA "Hungry Makishima" (腹ぺこ巻島くん, "harapeko Makishima-kun")
7	March 3, 2020	978-4-253-22477-2
SPARE.67 "Yonan University 1" (洋南大学 1, "Yōnan daigaku 1"); SPARE.68 "Yonan University 2" (洋南大学 2, "Yōnan daigaku 2"); SPARE.69 "Yonan University 3" (洋南大学 3, "Yōnan daigaku 3"); SPARE.70 "Yonan University 4" (洋南大学 4, "Yōnan daigaku 4"); SPARE.71 "Yonan University 5" (洋南大学 5, "Yōnan daigaku 5"); SPARE.72 "Yonan University 6" (洋南大学 6, "Yōnan daigaku 6"); SPARE.73 "Meisou University 1" (明早大学 1, "Meisō daigaku 1"); SPARE.74 "Meisou University 2" (明早大学 2, "Meisō daigaku 2"); SPARE.75 "Meisou University 3" (明早大学 3, "Meisō daigaku 3"); SPARE.76 "Meisou University 4" (明早大学 4, "Meisō daigaku 4")
8	December 8, 2020	978-4-253-22478-9
SPARE.78 "Toudou Jinpachi 9" (東堂尽八9, "Tōdō Jinpachi 9"); SPARE.79 "Toudou Jinpachi 10" (東堂尽八10, "Tōdō Jinpachi 10"); SPARE.80 "Toudou Jinpachi 11" (東堂尽八11, "Tōdō Jinpachi 11"); SPARE.81 "Toudou Jinpachi 12" (東堂尽八12, "Tōdō Jinpachi 12"); SPARE.82 "Toudou Jinpachi 13" (東堂尽八13, "Tōdō Jinpachi 13"); SPARE.83 "Toudou Jinpachi 14" (東堂尽八14, "Tōdō Jinpachi 14"); SPARE.84 "Toudou Jinpachi 15" (東堂尽八15, "Tōdō Jinpachi 15"); SPARE.85 "Toudou Jinpachi 16" (東堂尽八16, "Tōdō Jinpachi 16"); SPARE.86 "Toudou Jinpachi 17" (東堂尽八17, "Tōdō Jinpachi 17")
9	July 8, 2021	978-4-253-22479-6
SPARE.87 "Family Restaurant 1" (ファミレス1, "Famiresu 1"); SPARE.88 "Family Restaurant 2" (ファミレス2, "Famiresu 2"); SPARE.89 "Family Restaurant 3" (ファミレス3, "Famiresu 3"); SPARE.90 "Family Restaurant 4" (ファミレス4, "Famiresu 4"); SPARE.92 "Family Restaurant Epilogue" (ファミレスエピローグ, "Famiresu Epirōgu"); SPARE.102 "Toudou Jinpachi 5" (荒北靖友 5, "Toudou Jinpachi 5"); SPARE.103 "Toudou Jinpachi 6" (荒北靖友 6, "Toudou Jinpachi 6"); SPARE.104 "Toudou Jinpachi 7" (荒北靖友 7, "Toudou Jinpachi 7"); SPARE.105 "Toudou Jinpachi 8" (荒北靖友 5, "Toudou Jinpachi 8"); SPARE.77 "Hakone Academy 0" (箱根学園0, "Hakone gakuen 0")
10	May 6, 2022	978-4-253-22480-2
SPARE.93 "Graduation 1" (卒業 1, "Sotsugyō 1"); SPARE.94 "Tsukushiba University 1" (筑士波大学 1, "Tsukushiba Daigaku 1"); SPARE.95 "Tsukushiba University 2" (筑士波大学 2, "Tsukushiba Daigaku 2"); SPARE.96 "Tsukushiba University 3" (筑士波大学 3, "Tsukushiba Daigaku 3"); SPARE.97 "Makishima Yusuke 9" (巻島裕介 9, "Makishima Yusuke 9"); SPARE.98 "Tsukushiba University 4" (筑士波大学 4, "Tsukushiba Daigaku 4"); SPARE.99 "Tsukushiba University 5" (筑士波大学 5, "Tsukushiba Daigaku 5"); SPARE.100 "Tsukushiba University 6" (筑士波大学 6, "Tsukushiba Daigaku 6"); SPARE.101 "Tsukushiba University 7" (筑士波大学 7, "Tsukushiba Daigaku 7"); SPARE.109 "Leave It to Aoyagi!!" (おまかせ！！青八木さん)
11	January 6, 2023	978-4-253-28286-4
SPARE.112 "Mountain Tsukuba 1 "First Battle"" (筑波山１『初陣』, "Tsukuba Yama 1 "Uijin""); SPARE.113 "Mountain Tsukuba 2 "Four People"" (筑波山２『４人』, "Tsukuba Yama 2 "4-Nin""); SPARE.114 "Mountain Tsukuba 3 "Red Jersey"" (筑波山3『赤いジャージ』, "Tsukuba Yama 3 "Akai Jāji""); SPARE.115 "Mountain Tsukuba 4 "Introduction"" (筑波山４『名乗り』, "Tsukuba Yama 4 "Nanori""); SPARE.116 "Mountain Tsukuba 5 "Not the Ace"" (筑波山５『エースじゃない』, "Tsukuba Yama 5 "Ēsu Janai""); SPARE.117 "Mountain Tsukuba 6 "Disadvantage"" (筑波山６『枚数』, "Tsukuba Yama 6 "Maisū""); SPARE.118 "Mountain Tsukuba 7 "Conclusion"" (筑波山７『決着』, "Tsukuba Yama 7 "Ketchaku""); SPARE.91 "Usakichi 1" (ウサ吉1, "Usakichi 1"); SPARE.111 "Yonan Special One-Shot" (洋南特別読み切り, "Yōnan Tokubetsu Yomikiri"); SPARE.110 "Neighbor Shuusaku!" (おとなり！修作くん, "Otonari! Shūsaku-kun")
12	May 8, 2023	978-4-253-28287-1
13	January 5, 2024	978-4-253-28288-8
14	January 8, 2025	978-4-253-28289-5
15	November 7, 2025	978-4-253-00492-3
16	August 6, 2026	978-4-253-01865-4

=== Chapters not yet in tankōbon format ===
- SPARE.119 "Koseki Shou 1 "Reunion"" (小関翔１『再会』, "Koseki Shō 1 "Saikai"")
- SPARE.120 "Usakichi 2 "Sniffing"" (ウサ吉２『ヒクヒク』, "Usakichi 2 "Hiku Hiku"")
- SPARE.121 "Eating House 1 "Return"" (メシ屋1 『帰還』, "Meshi-ya 1 "Kikan"")

== After School Pedal volumes ==
The second spin-off series is a tribute for the series containing illustrations and stories by various writers and illustrators. As of April 2023 the series was collected into 9 tankōbon (books) and it is still ongoing.

No.	Release date	ISBN
1	June 6, 2014	978-4-253-21319-6
2	February 6, 2015	978-4-253-21320-2
3	August 7, 2015	978-4-253-21377-6
4	May 6, 2016	978-4-253-21378-3
5	January 6, 2017	978-4-253-21379-0
6	May 8, 2018	978-4-253-21703-3
7	July 8, 2019	978-4-253-21704-0
8	August 6, 2020	978-4-253-21738-5
HC	April 7, 2023	978-4-253-21739-2
