= Kimi wa Yotsuba no Clover =

Japanese manga series

- First tankōbon volume cover, featuring Yotsuha

きみは四葉のクローバー (Kimi wa Yotsuba no Kurōbā)
- Genre: Romantic thriller
- Manga
- Written by: Kōshi
- Published by: Akita Shoten
- English publisher: NA: Titan Manga
- Imprint: Shōnen Champion Comics
- Magazine: Weekly Shōnen Champion
- Original run: July 18, 2024 – October 15, 2026
- Volumes: 11
- Anime
- icon

Kimi wa Yotsuba no Clover (Japanese: きみは四葉のクローバー, Hepburn: Kimi wa Yotsuba no Kurōbā; lit. 'You Are a Four Leaf Clover') is a Japanese manga series written and illustrated by Kōshi. It was serialized in Akita Shoten's Weekly Shōnen Champion magazine from July 2024 to October 2026, and has been compiled into eleven tankōbon volumes as of October 2026. An anime adaptation has been announced.

== Plot ==
The series follows Uichi, a high school student who made a promise to his childhood friend Yotsuha before she moved away that he would become a veterinarian. Years later, his life has turned for the worse as his family is dysfunctional and he is the regular subject of bullying, driving him to the brink of suicide. Unexpectedly, Yotsuha returns and moves next door, transferring to his school. She is very attached to him and wants to protect him from further bullying.

== Characters ==
Yotsuha (よつは, Yotsuwa)
Voiced by: Nao Tomisato (PV)
A second-year high school student. She grew up in an orphanage without friends or family, until she was befriended by Uichi in elementary school. Even though she always appears cheerful and innocent, she harbors deep sorrow over the future of Uichi, as well as intense hatred towards people who caused it to happen. The watch she owns has the ability to turn back time to 8:15 pm of the previous day. She goes to about half a year earlier before Uichi committed suicide and aims to make Uichi happy again. Her name directly refers to four-leaf clover.
Uichi Utsu (宇津 宇一, Utsu Uichi)
Voiced by: Kenjiro Yagami (PV)
A second-year high school student. In elementary school, he was cheerful, had many friends, and excelled in both academics and sports. However, he becomes the target of bullying and his family starts to collapse in middle school, which causes him to be depressed and withdrawn. Depsite living in pure despair, he studies hard to fulfil a promise to his first love, Yotsuha, to become a veterinarian. He gradually regains his courage and hope in life after his reunion with Yotsuha.
Fuu-chan (ふーちゃん, Fuu-chan)
Yotsuha and Uichi's childhood friend in elementary school. Because she attends a private boarding school, she does not know about Uichi's situation until she hears about it from Yotsuha. She has extraordinary hacking skills and helps Yotsuha find the identity of a mysterious figure named "Clover".

== Media ==
=== Manga ===
The series is written and illustrated by Kōshi. It was serialized in Akita Shoten's Weekly Shōnen Champion magazine from July 18, 2024, to October 15, 2026, and has been compiled into eleven tankōbon volumes as of October 2026. On June 26, 2026, it was announced that the series has been licensed in English by Titan Comics under the title "You Are a Four Leaf Clover" and is slated for a September 2027 release.

No.	Release date	ISBN
1	December 6, 2024	978-4-253-29746-2
2	February 7, 2025	978-4-253-29747-9
3	April 8, 2025	978-4-253-29748-6
4	July 8, 2025	978-4-253-29749-3
5	August 7, 2025	978-4-253-29750-9
6	November 7, 2025	978-4-253-00528-9
7	February 6, 2026	978-4-253-01147-1
8	March 6, 2026	978-4-253-01208-9
9	June 8, 2026	978-4-253-01397-0
10	September 8, 2026	978-4-253-01947-7
11	October 7, 2026	978-4-253-02014-5

=== Anime ===
An anime adaptation was announced in the 10th volume of the manga released on September 8, 2026.

== Reception ==
The first chapter received over 30,000 likes on Twitter when it was posted on Kōshi's official account. The series has been nominated for the 11th Next Manga Awards in the print category in 2025.
