= Shiina (given name) =

- Gender: Female
- Language: Japanese

Origin
- Origin: Japanese
- Meaning: Depending on the kanji used
- Region of origin: Japan

Shiina (しいな, シイナ) is a Japanese feminine given name.

== People ==
- Shiina Natsukawa (椎菜; born 1996), a Japanese voice actress

== Fictional characters ==
- Shiina Mayuri (椎名 まゆり), a character in the visual novel Steins;Gate
- Shiina Amamiya (椎菜), a character in the Japanese light novel, manga and anime series Nogizaka Haruka no Himitsu.
- Sheena Fujibayashi (しいな), a character in the Japanese video game Tales of Symphonia
- Shiina Tamai (秕/シイナ), a character in the Japanese manga series Shadow Star
- Shiina Kamijō (詩菜), a character in the Japanese light novel, manga and anime series A Certain Magical Index
- Shiina Mikado (椎名), a character in the visual novel Katawa Shoujo
- Shiina Murakami (椎奈), a character in the Japanese manga series Magic of Stella
- Shiina Nagasawa (詩菜), a schoolgirl character in the Japanese shōnen manga series Akumetsu
- Shiina Mashiro (椎名), a character in the Japanese light novel, manga and anime series Sakurasou no Pet na Kanojo.
