= Lupin the Third: Neighbor World Princess =

Japanese manga series

- First tankōbon volume cover

ルパン三世 異世界の姫君(ネイバーワールドプリンセス) (Rupan Sansei Neibā Wārudo Purinsesu)
- Genre: Isekai
- Created by: Monkey Punch; MP Works
- Manga
- Written by: Yosuke Saeki
- Illustrated by: Keyaki Uchi-Uchi
- Published by: Akita Shoten
- Imprint: Shōnen Champion Comics
- Magazine: Weekly Shōnen Champion
- Original run: August 26, 2021 – present
- Volumes: 21

Lupin the Third: Neighbor World Princess (ルパン三世 異世界の姫君(ネイバーワールドプリンセス), Rupan Sansei Neibā Wārudo Purinsesu) is a Japanese manga series written by Yosuke Saeki and illustrated by Keyaki Uchi-Uchi. It began serialization in Akita Shoten's shōnen manga magazine Weekly Shōnen Champion in August 2021. The series is a spin-off of the Lupin the Third franchise.

== Plot ==
Lupin III and his gang steal a set of mysterious gold coins, said to originate from a country that does not exist. As Inspector Zenigata gives chase, Lupin, Jigen, Goemon, and Fujiko are suddenly transported through a strange door into an unfamiliar fantasy world. There, Lupin encounters Princess Aish, the first princess of the Kingdom of Isopemia, who is fleeing from her own soldiers because of political turmoil within the realm. Lupin and Aish decide to travel to the royal capital together, hoping to uncover the truth behind the kingdom and the coins.

As the journey continues, the group reunites after being scattered, with Jigen teaming up with a dwarf named Sumunna, and Goemon joining forces with Kishara, a half-elf warrior, after fending off goblins and other threats. Zenigata is also drawn into the fantasy world, continuing his relentless pursuit across unfamiliar terrain. While searching for a way back to their original world, the Lupin gang becomes entangled in local conflicts, confronts powerful enemies, and exploits opportunities for treasure along the way.

== Publication ==
Written by Yosuke Saeki and illustrated by Keyaki Uchi-Uchi with original character designs by Pairan, Lupin III: Neighbor World Princess began serialization in Akita Shoten's shōnen manga magazine Weekly Shōnen Champion on August 26, 2021. The series' first season ended on December 2, 2021, and resumed its second season on February 24, 2022. The series entered its final arc in August 2025. Its chapters have been collected into twenty-one tankōbon volumes as of October 2026.

No.	Release date	ISBN
1	February 8, 2022	978-4-253-28151-5
2	March 8, 2022	978-4-253-28152-2
3	July 7, 2022	978-4-253-28153-9
4	November 8, 2022	978-4-253-28154-6
5	January 6, 2023	978-4-253-28155-3
6	April 7, 2023	978-4-253-28156-0
7	June 8, 2023	978-4-253-28157-7
8	August 8, 2023	978-4-253-28158-4
9	December 7, 2023	978-4-253-28159-1
10	March 7, 2024	978-4-253-28160-7
11	May 8, 2024	978-4-253-28521-6
12	August 7, 2024	978-4-253-28522-3
13	November 8, 2024	978-4-253-28523-0
14	January 8, 2025	978-4-253-28524-7
15	April 8, 2025	978-4-253-28525-4
16	July 8, 2025	978-4-253-28526-1
17	October 8, 2025	978-4-253-00446-6
18	January 8, 2026	978-4-253-00966-9
19	April 8, 2026	978-4-253-01268-3
20	July 8, 2026	978-4-253-01790-9
21	October 7, 2026	978-4-253-02000-8
