= Nine Peaks (manga) =

Japanese manga series

- Cover of the first volume
- Genre: Action; Suspense; Yankī
- Manga
- Written by: Tetsuhiro Hirakawa
- Published by: Akita Shoten
- Magazine: Weekly Shōnen Champion (2022–2024); Manga Cross (2024–present)
- Original run: June 2, 2022 – present
- Volumes: 20

Nine Peaks (stylized in all caps) is a Japanese manga series written and illustrated by Tetsuhiro Hirakawa. The series began serialization in Akita Shoten's magazine Weekly Shōnen Champion in June 2022, where it was serialized until January 2024. In February 2024, the series transferred to Manga Cross. As of August 2026, twenty volumes have been released.

== Plot ==
Gaku, 16 years old, has a reputation as a tough guy who attracts local delinquents and frequently gets into fights, despite his father Harumi's scolding. As a result, Gaku has little respect for Harumi, but when Harumi dies in an accident, several people attend his funeral and mourn his loss. As a tribute to his father, Gaku goes fishing, his father's favorite activity, and falls in the water. However, he is saved by his father, but as a boy his age, 22 years earlier. He finds the city is overrun by local gangs and desires to help his father end the conflicts.

== Production ==
After finishing his previous work Clover, Hirakawa wanted to draw another delinquent manga. He decided to have it set in the 2000s because he felt that time frame was the end of the delinquent culture in Japan. Hirakawa decided to implement elements of time travel and family after watching Back to the Future, which he described as a major influence on the story. Hirakawa stated he has an ending in mind and would like to make the series about 30 volumes long.

== Media ==
=== Manga ===
Written and illustrated by Tetsuhiro Hirakawa, the series began serialization in Akita Shoten's magazine Weekly Shōnen Champion on June 2, 2022. In the issue of Weekly Shōnen Champion released on January 25, 2024, it was announced the series would be transferred to Akita Shoten's manga website Manga Cross. It began serialization on Manga Cross on February 7, 2024. As of August 2026, the series' individual chapters have been collected into twenty tankōbon volumes.

==== Volumes ====
No.	Japanese release date	Japanese ISBN
1	October 6, 2022	978-4-253-28226-0
2	December 8, 2022	978-4-253-28227-7
3	February 8, 2023	978-4-253-28228-4
4	May 8, 2023	978-4-253-28229-1
5	July 6, 2023	978-4-253-28230-7
6	September 7, 2023	978-4-253-28231-4
7	November 8, 2023	978-4-253-28232-1
8	February 7, 2024	978-4-253-28233-8
9	April 8, 2024	978-4-253-28234-5
10	July 8, 2024	978-4-253-28235-2
11	October 8, 2024	978-4-253-28236-9
12	January 8, 2025	978-4-253-28237-6
13	April 8, 2025	978-4-253-28238-3
14	July 8, 2025	978-4-253-28239-0
15	September 8, 2025	978-4-253-00343-8
16	December 8, 2025	978-4-253-00897-6
17	February 6, 2026	978-4-253-01143-3
18	April 8, 2026	978-4-253-01273-7
19	June 8, 2026	978-4-253-01389-5
20	August 6, 2026	978-4-253-01869-2

=== Video game ===
In 2024, Ki-oon, the series' French publisher, released a browser game adaptation of the manga.

== Reception ==
Marc Vandermeer of ActuaBD liked the story and setting. He also felt the artwork, especially the characters' faces, were very realistic. Faustine Lillaz of Planete BD felt the artwork was "fluid" and filled the page well. She also liked the characters. Columnists for Manga News liked the lead characters and their interactions. They also liked the use of time travel, which they felt was more subtle compared to Tokyo Revengers.

In 2026, Nine Peaks was nominated in the Daruma for Best Action Manga category at the Japan Expo Awards.

== See also ==
- Clover, another manga series by the same author
