= Meika-san wa Oshi Korosenai =

Japanese manga series

- First tankōbon volume cover

メイカさんは押しころせない
- Genre: Comedy
- Manga
- Written by: Shoki Satō
- Published by: Akita Shoten
- Magazine: Weekly Shōnen Champion (2020–2022); Manga Cross (2022–2023)
- Original run: January 23, 2020 – April 13, 2023
- Volumes: 12

Meika-san wa Oshi Korosenai (メイカさんは押しころせない; "The Maid Who Can't Hide Her Feelings") is a Japanese manga series written and illustrated by Shoki Satō. It was first serialized in Akita Shoten's shōnen manga magazine Weekly Shōnen Champion from January 2020 to November 2022 and it was later transferred to Manga Cross, where it ran from December 2022 to April 2023.

== Plot ==
Kouta Takashiro is a lazy and unreliable male high school student, and Meika Kujo is a classmate of his who lives and works in his house as a maid because she is indebted to his family. Meika sometimes treats Kouta, but suddenly, her hidden feelings for him come out, complicating their relationship as maid and master. They are classmates at school, but the secret and delicate relationship between Kouta and Meika will gradually change, involving their friends.

== Publication ==
Written and illustrated by Shoki Satō, Meika-san wa Oshi Korosenai was serialized in Akita Shoten's shōnen manga magazine Weekly Shōnen Champion from January 23, 2020, to November 24, 2022. The series was transferred to Manga Cross on December 8, 2022, where it ended on April 13, 2023. Akita Shoten collected its chapters in twelve tankōbon volumes, released from July 8, 2020, to July 6, 2023.

=== Volumes ===
No.	Release date	ISBN
1	July 8, 2020	978-4-253-22941-8
2	November 6, 2020	978-4-253-22942-5
3	March 8, 2021	978-4-253-22943-2
4	June 8, 2021	978-4-253-22944-9
5	August 6, 2021	978-4-253-22945-6
6	November 8, 2021	978-4-253-22946-3
7	February 8, 2022	978-4-253-22947-0
8	May 6, 2022	978-4-253-22948-7
9	September 8, 2022	978-4-253-22949-4
10	December 8, 2022	978-4-253-22950-0
11	March 8, 2023	978-4-253-29431-7
12	July 6, 2023	978-4-253-29432-4
