= Koe ga Dasenai Shōjo wa "Kanojo ga Yasashisugiru" to Omotte Iru =

Japanese manga series

- First tankōbon volume cover

声がだせない少女は「彼女が優しすぎる」と思っている
- Genre: Comedy
- Manga
- Written by: Ichi Yamura
- Published by: Akita Shoten
- Imprint: Shōnen Champion Comics
- Magazine: Weekly Shōnen Champion
- Original run: February 13, 2020 – January 11, 2024
- Volumes: 13

Koe ga Dasenai Shōjo wa "Kanojo ga Yasashisugiru" to Omotte Iru (Note: Japanese: 声がだせない少女は「彼女が優しすぎる」と思っている, Hepburn: lit. ''A girl who can't speak thinks "she is too kind"'') is a Japanese manga series written by Ichi Yamura. It was initially published as a webcomic on the author's Twitter account. It was later serialized in Akita Shoten's shōnen manga magazine Weekly Shōnen Champion from February 2020 to January 2024.

== Synopsis ==
A new transfer student named Mashiro Oto has arrived into the classroom of Kikuno Kokosaki. Mashiro has trouble communicating with people due to her inability to speak and holds a notepad describing her thoughts, but when Kokosaki starts talking to her, she's excited due to having someone she can talk to, believing that Kokosaki is kind. However, what she is unaware of is that Kokosaki is a telepath.

== Publication ==
Written and illustrated by Ichi Yamura, Koe ga Dasenai Shōjo wa "Kanojo ga Yasashisugiru" to Omotte Iru was initially published as a webcomic on the author's Twitter account on November 27, 2019. It was later serialized in Akita Shoten's shōnen manga magazine Weekly Shōnen Champion from February 13, 2020, to January 11, 2024. Its chapters were collected into thirteen tankōbon volumes from July 8, 2020, to March 7, 2024.

No.	Release date	ISBN
1	July 8, 2020	978-4-253-22951-7
2	November 6, 2020	978-4-253-22952-4
3	March 8, 2021	978-4-253-22953-1
4	June 8, 2021	978-4-253-22954-8
5	September 8, 2021	978-4-253-22955-5
6	December 8, 2021	978-4-253-22956-2
7	March 8, 2022	978-4-253-22957-9
8	July 7, 2022	978-4-253-22958-6
9	November 8, 2022	978-4-253-22959-3
10	April 7, 2023	978-4-253-22960-9
11	July 6, 2023	978-4-253-29461-4
12	November 8, 2023	978-4-253-29462-1
13	March 7, 2024	978-4-253-29463-8

== Reception ==
The series was nominated for the sixth Next Manga Awards in 2020 in the print category and was ranked eighth out of 50 nominees. The series was also ranked fifth in Pixiv and Nippon Shuppan Hanbai's "Web Manga General Election" poll in 2020.
