= Shūjin Riku =

Japanese manga series

- First tankōbon volume cover, featuring Riku Kurita

囚人リク
- Genre: Prison
- Manga
- Written by: Shinobu Seguchi
- Published by: Akita Shoten
- Magazine: Weekly Shōnen Champion
- Original run: February 10, 2011 – February 15, 2018
- Volumes: 38
- Manga

Boss Renoma: Shūjin Riku Gaiden
- Written by: Shinobu Seguchi
- Published by: Akita Shoten
- Magazine: Weekly Shōnen Champion
- Original run: August 30, 2018 – January 10, 2019
- Volumes: 2
- icon

Shūjin Riku (囚人リク) is a Japanese manga series written and illustrated by Shinobu Seguchi. It was serialized in Akita Shoten's shōnen manga magazine Weekly Shōnen Champion from February 2011 to February 2018, with its chapters collected in 38 tankōbon volumes. The story follows Riku Kurita, a 13-year-old boy from the slums, witnesses the assassination of an old police officer wanting to denounce the Tokyo police chief's countless trafficking activities. The latter accuses Riku of the murder and sends him to a prison on an island isolated from the rest of the country, the Paradise Island Penitentiary.

== Plot ==
One night, a meteorite crashed into the city of Tokyo. Ten years later, the destroyed Tokyo was undergoing reconstruction, but the area around the meteorite crater was left behind and turned into a slum area with extremely poor public safety. As a result, the megacity is cut in two, the affected area is a slum isolated from the rest of the country, and the rest of the city is reserved for rich people of the society. The slums were isolated by walls, and security was maintained even more strictly than in the outside. Riku Kurita, a boy orphaned by the meteorite crash, lives his days in the slums under the watchful eye of Goro Fujimoto, a middle-aged police officer whom he adores as his uncle. However, on July 8, in the 10th area of the slums, Fujimoto was killed while trying to expose the evil deeds of Eishu Kidoin, the police inspector general. Riku, who was present at the scene, was charged with murdering Fujimoto, he was imprisoned in Paradise Island Penitentiary. In order to defeat Kidouin and avenge his uncle's death, Riku decides to escape from prison with his friends. After much effort, he gathers his friends and manages to escape from the prison of the Island, but the group falls into Kidoin's hands and is sent to Kidoin's illegal facility, Hell Island on Jigokujima, where huge mine shafts were dug underground, and opium was cultivated and manufactured above ground. The group attempts to escape again under harsh conditions, with most of the prisoners being sent to die within a month.

== Publication ==
Written and illustrated by Shinobu Seguchi, Shūjin Riku was serialized in Akita Shoten's shōnen manga magazine Weekly Shōnen Champion from February 10, 2011, to February 15, 2018. Akita Shoten collected its chapters in 38 tankōbon volumes, released from June 8, 2011, to April 6, 2018.

A gaiden story, titled Boss Renoma: Shūjin Riku Gaiden (ボスレノマ～「囚人リク」外伝～, Bosu Renoma Shūjin Riku Gaiden), was serialized in the same magazine from August 30, 2018, to January 10, 2019. Akita Shoten collected its chapters in two volumes, released on January 8 and March 8, 2019.

On May 30, 2025, Seguchi revealed in an interview with Anime News Network that the manga will be digitally released in English in North America.
