= Clover (Tetsuhiro Hirakawa manga) =

Japanese manga series

クローバー (Kurōbā)
- Genre: Yankī
- Manga
- Written by: Tetsuhiro Hirakawa
- Published by: Akita Shoten
- Magazine: Weekly Shōnen Champion
- Original run: April 19, 2007 – October 15, 2015
- Volumes: 43
- Television drama
- Directed by: Yu Irie
- Written by: Naomi Murakami; Junpei Yamaoka
- Original network: TV Tokyo
- Original run: April 13, 2012 – June 29, 2012
- Episodes: 12

Clover (Japanese: クローバー, Hepburn: Kurōbā) is a Japanese fighting manga written and illustrated by Tetsuhiro Hirakawa. The series was serialized in Weekly Shōnen Champion from April 2007 to October 2015; its individual chapters were collected into 43 volumes. A television drama adaptation aired on TV Tokyo from April to June 2012.

== Media ==
=== Manga ===
Written and illustrated by Tetsuhiro Hirakawa, the manga began serialization in Weekly Shōnen Champion on April 19, 2007. The series completed serialization on October 15, 2015. The series' individual chapters were collected into 43 tankōbon volumes.

In France, the manga is licensed by 12 bis.

=== TV drama ===
A television drama adaptation was announced in January 2012. It was directed by Yu Irie, with scripts written by Naomi Murakami and Junpei Yamaoka. Kento Kaku performed the lead role. It was broadcast on TV Tokyo from April 13 to June 29, 2012, for a total of twelve episodes.

== Reception ==
Faustine Lillaz from Planete BD praised the artwork, characters, and plot. The reviewer for Manga Sanctuary had similar opinions, praising the plot and characters, as well as favorably comparing the artwork to that of Yellow Tanabe. The reviewer for Manga News largely shared the opinions of previous critics, praising the artwork and nothing that while the story is nothing new, it was still solid.

As of February 2012, the series has over 4.5 million copies in circulation.

== See also ==
- Nine Peaks, another manga series by the same author
