= The Shy Hero and the Assassin Princesses =

Japanese manga series

- First tankōbon volume cover, featuring Anemone, Ciel Zebul, Goa Minagawa (front), and Toto (back)

気絶勇者と暗殺姫 (Kizetsu Yūsha to Ansatsu Hime)
- Genre: Action; Fantasy comedy; Romantic comedy
- Manga
- Written by: Norishiro-chan
- Illustrated by: Yukiji Setsuda
- Published by: Akita Shoten
- Imprint: Shōnen Champion Comics
- Magazine: Weekly Shōnen Champion
- Original run: October 27, 2022 – present
- Volumes: 16
- Anime television series
- Directed by: Noriaki Akitaya
- Written by: Michiko Yokote
- Music by: Shun Narita
- Studio: Connect
- Licensed by: Crunchyroll: SA/SEA: Muse Communication
- Original network: Tokyo MX, SUN, HTB, UX, GYT, YTS, NCC, BS11, AT-X
- Original run: July 12, 2025 – September 27, 2025
- Episodes: 12
- icon

The Shy Hero and the Assassin Princesses (気絶勇者と暗殺姫, Kizetsu Yūsha to Ansatsu Hime; lit. 'The Fainting Hero and the Assassin Princesses') is a Japanese manga series written by Norishiro-chan and illustrated by Yukiji Setsuda. It began serialization in Akita Shoten's Weekly Shōnen Champion magazine in October 2022. An anime television series adaptation produced by Connect aired from July to September 2025.

== Plot ==
Toto is an E-rank adventurer who is physically imposing and strong, but he also suffers from crippling shyness especially when around young women. Three beautiful female adventurers, named Anemone, Ciel Zebul and Goa Minagawa, decide to form a party with Toto. Unbeknownst to him, all three of them are assassins plotting to kill him.

== Characters ==
Toto (トト)
Voiced by: Shunsuke Takeuchi
An E-rank adventurer who suffers from crippling shyness despite his imposing appearance and physical strength.
Ciel Zebul (シエル・ゼブル, Shieru Zeburu)
Voiced by: Iori Saeki
A young mage who is secretly the Demon Lord's daughter. She is sent to kill Toto under her father's orders.
Anemone (アネモネ)
Voiced by: Hitomi Ueda
A skilled assassin who is hired to kill Toto while posing as a priestess. She likes money and alcohol but hates slave traders.
Goa Minagawa (ゴア・ミナガワ)
Voiced by: Haruka Shiraishi
A sadistic dominatrix who is targeting Toto while posing as a traveling dancer.

== Media ==
=== Manga ===
Written by Norishiro-chan and illustrated by Yukiji Setsuda, The Shy Hero and the Assassin Princesses began serialization in Akita Shoten's Weekly Shōnen Champion magazine on October 27, 2022. The series has been compiled into sixteen tankōbon volumes as of September 2026.

No.	Release date	ISBN
1	April 7, 2023	978-4-253-28086-0
2	June 8, 2023	978-4-253-28087-7
3	August 8, 2023	978-4-253-28088-4
4	November 8, 2023	978-4-253-28089-1
5	January 5, 2024	978-4-253-28090-7
6	March 7, 2024	978-4-253-28216-1
7	June 7, 2024	978-4-253-28217-8
8	August 7, 2024	978-4-253-28218-5
9	November 8, 2024	978-4-253-28219-2
10	February 7, 2025	978-4-253-28220-8
11	April 8, 2025	978-4-253-28221-5
12	July 8, 2025	978-4-253-28222-2
13	September 8, 2025	978-4-253-00165-6
14	December 8, 2025	978-4-253-00490-9
15	April 8, 2026	978-4-253-01190-7
16	September 8, 2026	978-4-253-01862-3

=== Anime ===
An anime adaptation was announced in the 10th volume of the manga released on February 7, 2025, which was later revealed to be a television series produced by Connect and directed by Noriaki Akitaya, with scripts written by Michiko Yokote, characters designed by Takao Sano, and music composed by Shun Narita. The series aired on July 12 to September 27, 2025, on Tokyo MX and other networks. (Note: Episodes were released on ABEMA, Crunchyroll and simulcast platforms by Muse a week before their televised airings.) The opening theme song is "Tenden Barabara" (天伝バラバラ), performed by Yoshino, while the ending theme song is "Pocket Moment" (スキマジカン, Sukima Jikan), performed by Iori Saeki, Hitomi Ueda and Haruka Shiraishi as their respective characters. Crunchyroll streamed the series as it aired. Muse Communication licensed the series in South and Southeast Asia.

==== Episodes ====
No.	Title	Directed by (Note: Production staff information is taken from the ending credits of each episode.)	Written by	Storyboarded by	Original release date
1	"The Shy Hero and the Three Princesses"; Transliteration: "Kizetsu Yūsha to San-nin no Himegimi-tachi" (Japanese: 気絶勇者と三人の姫君たち)	Yoshifumi Sasahara	Michiko Yokote	Yoshifumi Sasahara	July 12, 2025
Toto, a physically powerful E-rank hero, ends up in a party with three young women, Ciel Zebul, Anemone and Goa Minagawa, unaware all three are trying to kill him for various reasons. Due to his crippling shyness, the ladies causes Toto to instantly faint. They then fight over him until Ciel accidentally summons a rampaging Spider Dragon, which Toto kills with one punch. Impressed and feeling guilty, the ladies decide not to kill Toto just yet. With her sexiness, Goa causes Toto to faint again so they can talk. Anemone later ends up saving a young girl from slavers, one of whom almost kills her, but Toto kills him instead. Confused, she makes Toto faint once again and admits to the others she needs Toto's bounty to fight against the slave trade. The party spends the night at an inn where Goa tries to use drugs and magic to seduce Toto. Even though he is unconscious, his heroic willpower overwhelms her. Unsure what to do next, the ladies decides to remain in Toto's party temporarily. Toto awakens certain he dreamt everything. After spotting the ladies asleep on the bed together, he faints again.
2	"The Shy Hero and the First Adventure"; Transliteration: "Kizetsu Yūsha to Hajimete no Bōken" (Japanese: 気絶勇者とはじめての冒険)	Noriaki Akitaya	Michiko Yokote	Noriaki Akitaya, Taichi Seki	July 19, 2025
The ladies end up in a stalemate over who gets to kill Toto. The party soon registers at the adventurer's guild to start taking jobs. Once Ciel causes Toto to pass out, she demands to know why they are adventuring. In the end, the ladies decide they will take turns trying to kill Toto once a day. Ciel wins the right to try first. While alone with Toto, she asks why he wants to be an adventurer. He admits he wants more self-confidence, since if he manages to defeat the Demon Lord then talking normally to people should be easy. Ciel unexpectedly relates to this as she is trying to prove herself to her father. A weapon merchant soon sends the party to the Lake Caves to collect raw iron. Surprisingly, Toto is able to stay awake while working. Ciel proceeds to test him by summoning slimes. Once she summons an Emperor-slime, Toto becomes stuck. However, he ultimately destroys it with the power of his voice alone. Ciel surrenders for the day while Toto collects over a ton of iron to complete their first quest.
3	"The Shy Hero and the Lovers' Rendezvous"; Transliteration: "Kizetsu Yūsha to Aibiki Dēto" (Japanese: 気絶勇者と逢引きデート)	Yūsuke Tomita	Michiko Yokote	Yūsuke Tomita	July 26, 2025
Goa takes her turn with Toto and tries to drug his food, but his heroic aura makes him immune. Goa then asks him directly to become her willing slave, but he refuses. After he faints, she notices he delayed it by hurting himself. Ciel and Anemone soon notice that Goa is acting as if she and Toto are on a date. The next day, Anemone takes Toto to forage herbs and asks about his facial scar. Toto admits he got it from a monster that killed his family and ruined his self-confidence. Elsewhere, Ciel and Goa interrupt a robbery by Zack the Scythe, whom Ciel defeats for his bounty. Goa proceeds to use drugs to erase everyone's memory in case Toto discovers how powerful they are. Anemone makes Toto faint again and plants a bomb on him that magically increases to match the target's power. Unfortunately, it grows so large it threatens the entire town so Anemone is forced to wake him up so he can throw the bomb far away. The bomb destroys a mountain and Anemone is embarrassed Toto shielded her from the blast. Toto believes he and Anemone have grown a little bit closer.
4	"The Shy Hero and the Promotion Quest"; Transliteration: "Kizetsu Yūsha to Shōkaku Ninmu" (Japanese: 気絶勇者と昇格任務)	Geisei Morita	Michiko Yokote	Takumi Shibata	August 2, 2025
The party becomes eligible for promotion to D-rank where they must clear a dungeon by demonstrating teamwork. There, the girls fail to kill Toto due to sabotaging each other. Deeper in the dungeon, the party encounter separate rooms: Treasure, Fame, and Pleasure. Each girl chooses a different room, intending to battle the others and then force Toto to go through a door with the winner. Toto remembers they are supposed to be searching for the lowest floor, so he smashes through the floor instead. On the lowest floor, they meet examiner Bele the Burly, who plans to fight Toto as the final test. The girls decide to help Bele by casting buff spells on him, but Toto still wins and the party is promoted to D-rank. Deciding to put their hostility aside, the girls go drinking together to celebrate, but their drunken antics soon have Toto fainting again. The girls debate having a real fight among themselves but in the end they are too drunk and cheerful to bother. Toto eventually awakens and is happy to see them getting along. That night, Ciel is contacted by her father's bodyguard, Hapi the Harpy.
5	"The Shy Hero and Independence"; Transliteration: "Kizetsu Yūsha to Hitori-dachi" (Japanese: 気絶勇者と独り立ち)	Yoshiaki Kyōgoku	Hiroyuki Yoshino	Kazuhisa Takenouchi	August 9, 2025
While Hapi treats Ciel like a daughter, she explains Ciel's father is worried about her progress, so unless she kills Toto within 24 hours, Hapi must drag Ciel back home to resume hellish training. When Ciel informs the other two of this, Goa gives her the opportunity to try kill Toto by dragging Anemone shopping. As Toto is immune to almost all physical damage, Ciel chooses the Forest Cave dungeon specifically because it has magic traps that will affect him. Ciel flashes her legs to make Toto faint and summons a magic scythe to kill him. At the last moment, she changes her mind. Toto awakens and helps Ciel eradicate the nest. Later, Hapi is confused why Ciel healed Toto. Ciel admits her crime and consents to be taken home for punishment. Instead, Hapi lets her stay, revealing she was actually there to judge whether Ciel was capable of experiencing independence. A satisfied Hapi then leaves. Goa and Anemone notice Ciel seems more mature. As the party is now D-rank, Goa suggests they go on a proper expedition requiring them to camp together in tents, causing Toto to faint.
6	"The Shy Hero and the Costumed Princesses"; Transliteration: "Kizetsu Yūsha to Kasō no Himegimi-tachi" (Japanese: 気絶勇者と仮装の姫君達)	Noriaki Akitaya	Michiko Yokote	Kazuhisa Takenouchi	August 16, 2025
The party begin their expedition transporting a crate to the town of Ani. Ciel warns Toto he cannot pass out since she will have to carry him and the crate with magic. Toto soon faints when a breeze blows up Ciel's dress. On day 2, Anemone deliberately makes him faint so she can smoke. While fishing, Ciel takes the opportunity to cast a gravity spell on Toto. Toto does not notice this, however, and even catches a fish monster. Fortunately, normal fish begin to appear and they catch enough for supper, which Ciel enjoys more than the luxurious meals at her father's castle. On day 4, the party arrives in Ani and learn the crate owner was struggling since no one can contact De Foori, the city where his usual supplier is located. The girls go clothes shopping, but everything they wear makes Toto faint. In they end, they keep their normal clothes. The girls caution him not to work too hard, remembering that him being unconscious occasionally has its advantages. Curious about De Foori, the party travels there and find the city, notorious for its large military fortress, has inexplicably become a place of love and peace.
7	"The Shy Hero and the Town of Mad Love"; Transliteration: "Kizetsu Yūsha to Kyōai no Machi" (Japanese: 気絶勇者と狂愛の街)	Geisei Morita	Hiroyuki Yoshino	Hiroshi Matsuzono	August 23, 2025
As only lovers are welcome, Goa poses as a couple with Toto. Goa notices exhausted couples everywhere and an adventurer being sent to prison for being single. At the adventurers guild, they learn all deliveries to other cities have been stopped as no one wishes to leave the city. Goa suspects everyone is under mass hypnosis. Toto and Goa soon encounter a normal young boy named Tim, who explains what happened. Meanwhile, Ciel reluctantly gets involved when even Anemone agrees to help. To reach the castle, Toto and Anemone poses as a married couple. Observing from a distance, Ciel realizes the hypnosis magic is particularly strong inside the castle. After only a few minutes inside, Anemone becomes hypnotized and tries to seduce Toto. When he refuses her advances, she attacks him. Unsure what to do, Toto allows himself to be sent to the dungeon. There, he meets all the normal citizens, including Tim's parents. Elsewhere, Anemone is taken to meet the love-obsessed Minister, where she reveals the location of Tim, Goa, and Ciel and begins shooting at them with a sniper rifle.
8	"The Shy Hero and the Witch of Hypnosis"; Transliteration: "Kizetsu Yūsha to Saimin no Majo" (Japanese: 気絶勇者と催眠の魔女)	Noriaki Akitaya	Hiroyuki Yoshino	Ten Ōguro	August 30, 2025
Deducing Anemone has been hypnotized, Ciel kills the Minister. However, Anemone remains hypnotized as the true culprit reveals herself to be a succubus named Yulia Maios. Yulia decides to hypnotize Ciel as well. Meanwhile, Toto helps the citizens escape the dungeon then heads to the Minister's room, where he finds Anemone and Ciel waiting for him. Yulia explains that succubi normally kill their victims by draining their energy, but she decided to leave them alive to lure even more people into visiting De Foori. Just as Toto starts to succumb to the hypnosis and is almost seduced by Anemone and Ciel, Goa shows up. Refusing to be outperformed at seduction, Goa breaks Yulia's hypnosis on Anemone and Ciel. Toto proceeds to defeat Yulia with one punch, breaking the hypnosis on the entire city. A weakened Yulia tries to quietly escape but she is caught and murdered by Goa. Afterward, Anemone and Ciel are embarrassed that they confessed their true feelings for Toto while hypnotized, though he did not realize it. When Toto inquires about what the girls were doing, they deliberately cause him to faint.
9	"The Shy Hero and Wrestling on the Water"; Transliteration: "Kizetsu Yūsha to Kaijō Sumō" (Japanese: 気絶勇者と海上相撲)	Yūsuke Tomita	Hiroyuki Yoshino	Kazuhisa Takenouchi	September 6, 2025
The party visits Anglerun beach and learn of a local wrestling competition. An arrogant B-rank hero, Fresnir, is entranced by Goa and insists she join his party. Goa decides to join whoever wins the competition. Anemone insists she and Ciel will compete as they will increase their odds of killing Toto themselves if Goa leaves. Toto and Anemone win their respective matches against normal competitors. Ciel cannot resist trying to beat Fresnir, but is disqualified when she uses magic. In the semi-finals, Toto takes on Anemone. Not wanting her plan to be ruined, Anemone causes Toto to faint when she kisses him on the cheek. She then faces Fresnir in the final. Anemone inadvertently wins the competition when she instinctively punches Fresnir following her bikini top being torn. A fed up Ciel soon summons a kraken when Fresnir furiously demands a real duel with Toto. Once Toto kills it, Fresnir becomes his biggest fan. Coshta, Fresnir's only party member, confronts Ciel about being the Demon Lord's daughter and reveals he is actually a Dullahan. Ciel is confused why a monster would be in a Hero's party.
10	"The Shy Hero and the Demons"; Transliteration: "Kizetsu Yūsha to Mazoku no Kizuna" (Japanese: 気絶勇者と魔族の絆)	Yoshiaki Kyōgoku	Michiko Yokote	Yoshiaki Kyōgoku	September 13, 2025
Fresnir assures the party that Coshta is his best friend. Coshta then explains how he and Fresnir met. Afterward, Fresnir decides to leave, determined to grow as strong as Toto. Toto soon begins to hesitate killing monsters as he always believed they were evil. When Ciel approaches him, she asks Toto if he likes her, but he only confirms she is important to him. In response, she asks if he would feel the same if he hypothetically discovered the truth about herself, Anemone, and Goa. Toto confirms he would find a way to co-exist with them. While Goa is happy to hear this, she realizes if Toto had to choose a partner, he would obviously pick the others. The next morning, the party reaches the adventuring town De Cide and learn from the local guild they are eligible for the C-rank promotion exam. Goa books the party one room to share. Once Toto faints, she announces it is her turn to try and kill him. The next morning, Anemone awakens to find Goa and Ciel are missing and Toto is dead.
11	"The Shy Hero and the Master of Dreams"; Transliteration: "Kizetsu Yūsha to Madoromi no Jūnin" (Japanese: 気絶勇者とまどろみの住人)	Noriaki Akitaya	Michiko Yokote	Hiroshi Matsuzono	September 20, 2025
Anemone looks around for Goa and Ciel before she becomes confused about the situation. Deciding she must have assassinated Toto, she uses her payment to fight the slave trade. When she opens an orphanage, she experiences vague memories of people she cannot identify. Meanwhile, Ciel awakens alone and finds Toto dead. Hapi informs Ciel that she saw her kill Toto. The Demon Lord soon accepts Ciel as heir to his throne but she cannot remember actually killing Toto. Instead, she experiences similar vague memories of people she cannot identify. Elsewhere, Toto awakens and he and the girls pass their promotion exam, becoming successful and respected by the public. In reality, it is revealed Goa has drugged them all to keep them trapped in happy dreams while erasing their memories until there is nothing left. She then remembers losing her childhood friend who grew scared of her ability to control people. The child Goa suddenly appears in Ciel, Anemone, and Toto's dreams, urging them to remember what they have forgotten. After a while, they regain their memories once they remember who Goa is.
12	"The Shy Hero and the Assassin Princesses"; Transliteration: "Kizetsu Yūsha to Ansatsu Hime" (Japanese: 気絶勇者と暗殺姫)	Noriaki Akitaya & Tatsuya Igarashi	Michiko Yokote	Yoshifumi Sasahara	September 27, 2025
Child Goa believes she is the real Goa's subconscious desire to not hurt Ciel, Anemone, and Toto. Toto assures her that he could never hate her. Everyone awakens and Goa is surprised when Toto confesses he loves her before he faints. Afterward, Anemone and Ciel explain how they got help from child Goa. Privately, Goa is happy because everyone escaping means they believed in her. The next day, the party takes on a job to kill a monster terrorizing farmers. They soon encounter a lightning fast puppy-like monster, which they are unable to capture. The party returns to the farmers only to learn the culprit was not the monster, but a wild boar. A feather the monster dropped suddenly restores all the damaged crops. Ciel realizes the monster must have actually been a Divine Beast. Toto admits to becoming overconfident due to him enjoying traveling with the girls. The girls themselves see no problem with enjoying the journey. Toto promises to work on his fainting issue. The girls then jointly cause him to pass out and begin negotiating on whose turn it is to kill him next.

== See also ==
- Gals Can't Be Kind to Otaku!?, another manga series written by Norishiro-chan
