= Akumetsu =

Japanese manga series

- Akumetsu vol. 1
- Manga
- Written by: Yoshiaki Tabata
- Illustrated by: Yûki Yugo
- Published by: Akita Shoten
- Magazine: Weekly Shōnen Champion
- Original run: October 2002 – April 6, 2006
- Volumes: 18

Akumetsu (Japanese: アクメツ; lit. "Destroyer of Evil") is a Japanese shōnen manga series written by Yoshiaki Tabata and illustrated by Yuki Yugo. Akumetsu was serialized in Akita Shoten's Weekly Shōnen Champion from 2002 to 2006.

== Plot ==
The setting for the story is a near-future Japan where politicians and businessmen pamper and lavish themselves amidst growing public unrest, while excessive corruption and speculation lead the country to a massive economic downfall, increasing the public deficit to an enormous seven hundred trillion yen and triggering an economic recession. When her father's company goes bankrupt, Shiina finds out and resolves to sell herself into prostitution by attending high-class parties through an escort agency, in order to help pay off her family's debt.

It is during the first and only such party she attends, where the guests were mainly VIPs and high-profile officials of the Ministry of Finance, and what was set to become an orgy, is suddenly interrupted by a young man wearing an Oni mask, who after giving a speech on how savage and corrupt the upper class of Japan has become, shoots the attendants in order to state his point and then proceeds to brutally slaughter the most prominent guest using a fire axe. Recognized by a frantic Shiina as Shou, the man simply waves the statement off as a misunderstanding, then grabs the mauled body of his victim and walks calmly to the front lobby, where he is gunned down by police and, before dying, has his head blown off by a device implanted into his own mask.

Thus, the act introduces a long, violent campaign of murders performed by such masked individuals, targeting those who are deemed as responsible for the massive economic crisis and, as such, labeled as evil by the masked men, who all goes by the common alias Akumetsu (literally destroyer of evil).

== Release ==
The series has been published in Italy by JPOP from October 2007 to August 2008 and in France by Taifu comics.

== See also ==
- Runaway Horses
