= Weekly Shōnen Champion =

Japanese manga magazine

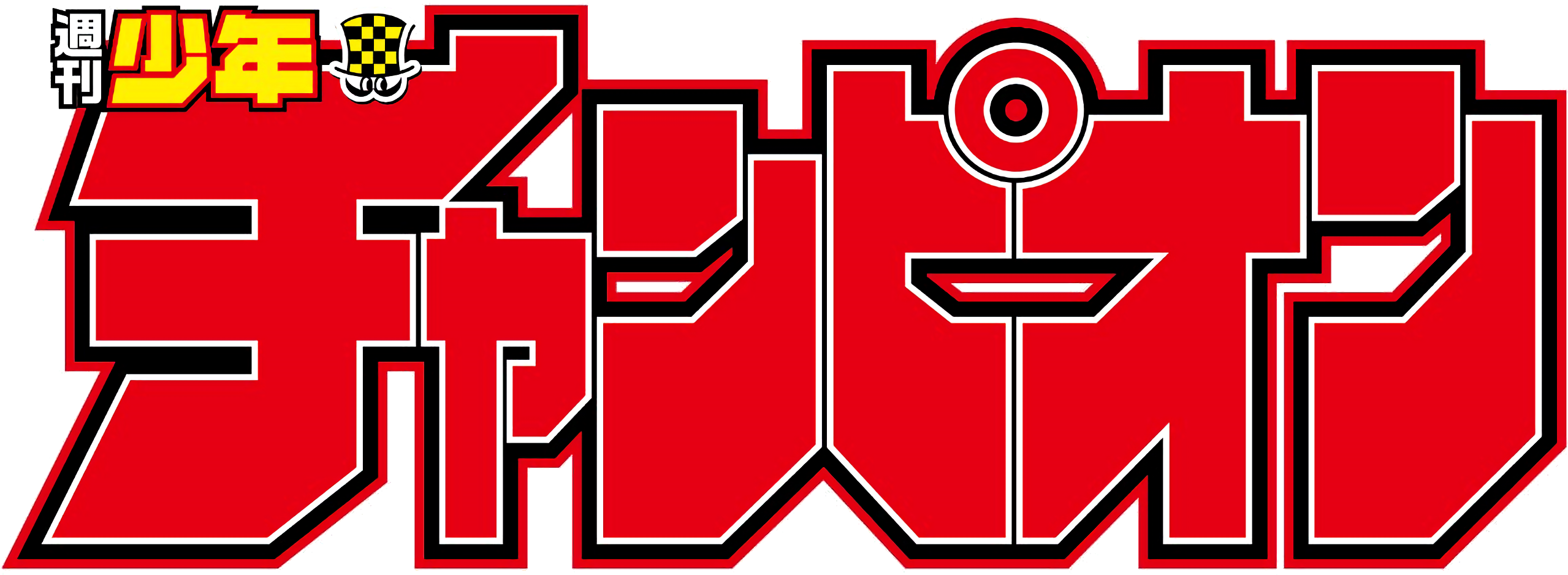

- Weekly Shōnen Champion cover for its 50th anniversary
- Categories: Shōnen manga
- Frequency: Weekly
- Circulation: 250,000
- First issue: July 15, 1969
- Company: Akita Shoten
- Country: Japan
- Based in: Tokyo
- Language: Japanese
- Website: Official website

Weekly Shōnen Champion (Japanese: 週刊少年チャンピオン, Hepburn: Shūkan Shōnen Champion) is a Japanese shōnen manga magazine published by Akita Shoten.

== History ==
Shōnen Champion was first published on July 15, 1969. It has had numerous popular series by manga artists such as Osamu Tezuka, Go Nagai, Shinji Mizushima, Masami Kurumada, and Keisuke Itagaki. The magazine is published every Thursday. It had a circulation of 250,000 from 1 October 2018 to 30 September 2019.

A digital supplement manga magazine titled Champion Buzz began publication on October 5, 2023.

== Currently running manga series ==
There are currently 32 manga titles being serialized in Weekly Shōnen Champion. Out of them Manga Yūenchi: Baki Gaiden is serialized monthly; Welcome to Demon School! Iruma-kun: IruMafia Edition is serialized biweekly; Saint Seiya: Heaven Chapter, Mashiro-kun and Shiraken! are published on an irregular basis; Baki Gaiden: Scarface, The Vampire Dies in No Time, The Shy Hero and the Assassin Princesses and Rappa: Badboys Ninja Chronicle are on indefinite hiatus.

Series Title	Author(s)	Premiered
BAD-CONTACT! (バドこん！, Badokon!)	Masahiro Anbe	July 23, 2026
Baki Rahen (刃牙らへん)	Keisuke Itagaki	August 24, 2023
Baki Gaiden: Scarface (バキ外伝 疵面-スカーフェイス-)	Keisuke Itagaki, Yukinao Yamauchi	January 15, 2009
Campioni (カンピオーニ)	Tatsuya Ara	December 25, 2025
Cherry Yūsha to "Sei" naru Tsurugi (チェリー勇者と"せい"なる剣)	Yuzuki Uchiba	October 24, 2024
Doko Tsu Rando (Kari) ~ Doko ni demo iru kedo, Doko ni mo Inai Aitsura no Tochi ~ (どこツらんど(仮)〜どこにでもいるけど、どこにもいないアイツらの土地〜)	Natsume Sanchi	June 11, 2026
Enma's Classroom (閻魔の教室, Enma no Kyōshitsu)	Yūji Tanaka	April 17, 2025
Gakuen Idolmaster GOLD RUSH (学園アイドルマスター GOLD RUSH)	Bandai Namco Entertainment, Kotoba Inoya, Yū Okino	October 3, 2024
Hanzo and 13 Kunoichis (半蔵と十三人の女忍たち, Hanzo to Jusannin no Kunoichi-tachi)	Yūji Nakamura	January 15, 2026
Lupin the Third: Neighbor World Princess (ルパン三世 異世界の姫君(ネイバーワールドプリンセス))	Monkey Punch, Yōsuke Saeki, Keyaki Uchi-Uchi, Pairan	August 26, 2021
Manga Yūenchi: Baki Gaiden (漫画 ゆうえんち-バキ外伝-)	Keisuke Itagaki, Baku Yumemakura, Yuria Fujita	March 17, 2022
Mashiro-kun (ましろくん)	Anycolor Inc., Mashiro Meme, nyo-n	January 22, 2026
Mokuyōbi no Furutto (木曜日のフルット)	Masakazu Ishiguro	January 8, 2009
Mōretsu! Super Radical Gag Family (モーレツ！浦安鉄筋家族, Mōretsu! Urayasu Tekkin Kazoku)	Kenji Hamaoka	November 13, 2025
Oedo Fire Slayer: The Legend of Phoenix (火喰鳥 羽州ぼろ鳶組, Hikuidori: Ushū Borotobi-Gumi)	Shōgo Imamura, Shinobu Seguchi	April 24, 2025
Ogamida-san Wants To See Your Blushing Face (拝田さんはヘタレ顔が見たい, Haita-san wa Hetaregao ga Mitai)	Ritsu Urano	July 2, 2026
Rappa: Badboys Ninja Chronicle (乱破-ヤンキー忍風帖-, Rappa: Yankī Ninpūchō)	Eiji Hashimoto	September 26, 2024
Rokunensei to Shitai Koto (6年生としたいこと)	Taku Kawakura	July 29, 2026
Saint Seiya: Heaven Chapter (聖闘士星矢 天界篇, Seinto Seiya Tenkai-hen)	Masami Kurumada	May 14, 2026
Shiraken! (しらないこと研究会, Shiranai Koto Kenkyūkai)	Shiranui Kensetsu, Tsumumi	January 12, 2024
Taika's Reason (タイカの理性, Taika no Risei)	Paru Itagaki	January 16, 2025
Tatarigatachi - Dochaku-shin Geigeki Gakuin (タタリガタチ-土着神迎撃学院-)	yoruhashi	October 22, 2026
The Shy Hero and the Assassin Princesses (気絶勇者と暗殺姫, Kizetsu Yūsha to Ansatsu Hime)	Yukichi Yukida, Norishiro-chan	October 27, 2022
Tougen Anki: Legend of the Cursed Blood (桃源暗鬼, Tōgen Anki)	Yura Urushibara	June 11, 2020
The Vampire Dies in No Time (吸血鬼すぐ死ぬ, Kyūketsuki Sugu Shinu)	Itaru Bonnoki	June 25, 2015
We Have a Subsitution to Announce (選手の交代をお知らせいたします, Senshu no Kōtai o Oshirase Itashimasu)	Masaya Tsunamoto, Tomoichirō Oka	April 2, 2026
Welcome to Demon School! Iruma-kun (魔入りました!入間くん, Mairimashita! Iruma-kun)	Osamu Nishi	March 2, 2017
Welcome to Demon School! Iruma-kun: IruMafia Edition (漫画：魔入りました!入間くん if Episode of 魔フィア, Mairimashita! Iruma-kun if Episode of Mafia)	Osamu Nishi, hiroja	December 11, 2025
Worst Gaiden Guriko (WORST外伝 グリコ)	Hiroshi Takahashi, Ryuuta Suzuki	January 17, 2019
Yankee JK Kuzuhana-chan (ヤンキーJKクズハナちゃん)	Toshinori Sogabe	March 19, 2020
Yōkoso Horrror Gakka e (よ～こそホラー学科へ)	Shuri Shinobu	May 21, 2026
Yowamushi Pedal (弱虫ペダル)	Wataru Watanabe	February 21, 2008

== Champion Buzz ==
Champion Buzz (チャンピオンBUZZ) is a digital supplement magazine running since October 5, 2023 in conjunction with digital issue releases of Weekly Shonen Champion every first Thursday of the month.

=== Currently featured series ===
There are currently 14 manga titles being serialized in Champion Buzz.

Series Title	Author(s)	Premiered
Baki no Wa!: Baki Talk with High School Girls (バキのわ！～バキを語る女子高校生たち～, Baki no Wa! ~ Baki o Kataru Joshi Kōkōsei-tachi ~)	Keisuke Itagaki, Norito Naka	December 4, 2025
Dansō o Shiirare Otoko to Shite Ikite Kita Kōshaku Reijō wa, Nikai-me no Jinsei wa Doresu o Kite, Reijō Raifu o Ōka Shitai (男装を強いられ男として生きてきた公爵令嬢は、2回目の人生はドレスを着て、令嬢ライフを謳歌したい)	Mashimesa Emoto, Hikari	November 5, 2026
Girls x Vampire (ガールズ×ヴァンパイア, Gāruzu × Vanpaia)	Teren Mikami, Minori Chigusa	December 4, 2025
Gokujo-shī ~ Gokudō, Joshi Shōgakusei ni Naru ~ (ごくじょしー極道、女子小学生になるー)	Mitsuhiro Kimura	July 3, 2025
I Want To Spend The Day By The River (今日は川辺で過ごしたい, Kyō wa Kawabe de Sugoshitai)	Masume Yoshimotro	November 5, 2026
Inaka de Hajimeru Kyūkatsu Surō Raifu ~ Chotto Shigoto Yamete Jikka ni Kaeru wa ~ (田舎ではじめる休活スローライフ～ちょっと仕事辞めて実家に帰るわ～)	Kabuo, Renkin-Ō	January 8, 2026
Janai Hō no Seijo to Yūsha ～Are, Watashitachi tte Hontō ni “Janai Hō”?～ (じゃない方の聖女と勇者～あれ、私たちって本当に『じゃない方』?～)	Nini Sembongi, Yui Hanaka	February 5, 2026
Kyūkei Hairimasu (休憩入ります)	Tremolo Shirakawa	December 4, 2025
Mairimashita! Iruma-kun: Boku Dōmei no Gēmu-dō (魔入りました！入間くん 僕同盟のゲーム)	Osamu Nishi, Atsushi Tsudanuma, Konisuke	March 6, 2026
Ochiyomeru no Kokuin (オチヨメルの刻印)	Hinome Minu, Kyūjū Takeo	December 4, 2025
Seekers: Meikyuu Saikyou no Ojisan, Kami Haishinsha to Naru~ (シーカーズ～迷宮最強のおじさん、神配信者となる～)	AteRa, Naka Murata	October 5, 2023
The Skill Tree Unlocker (スキルツリーの解錠者～A級パーティーを追放されたので【解錠&施錠】を活かして、S級冒険者を目指す～, Sukiru Tsurī no Kaijōsha ~ Ē-kyū Pātī o Tsuihō Sareta node [Kaijō & Seijō] o Ikashite, Esu-kyū Bōkensha o Mezasu ~)	Kei Ichimatsu, Renkin-Ō	December 4, 2025
Unsōya no Ossan ga Nazeka Fukugyō de Zettai Muteki Kenshi o Tsutomeru Koto ni ~ Saenai Jinsei o Okutteta Ore ga Maō Tōbatsu no Kirifuda ni?~ (運送屋のおっさんがなぜか副業で絶対無敵剣士を務めることに～さえない人生を送ってた俺が魔王討伐の切り札に？～)	Konoha Sakuya, Kōichirō Hoshino	June 6, 2024
Yuusha Goroshi no Moto Ansatsusha. ~Mushoku no Ossan kara Hajimaru Second Life~ (勇者殺しの元暗殺者。～無職のおっさんから始まるセカンドライフ～)	Kikuchi, Takeya Okamoto	February 1, 2024

== Past series ==
- 750 Rider
- The Abashiri Family
- AI no Idenshi
- Akumetsu
- Alabaster
- Apocalypse Zero
- Atsumare! Fushigi Kenkyū-bu
- Babel II
- Baki the Grappler
- Beastars
- Black Jack by Osamu Tezuka
- Clover
- The Crater by Osamu Tezuka (1969–1970)
- Cutie Honey by Go Nagai (1973–1974)
- The Dangers in My Heart – transferred to Champion Cross
- Dokaben by Shinji Mizushima (1972–1981)
- Don Dracula
- Duke Goblin
- Eiken
- Eko Eko Azarak
- Fuan no Tane Plus by Masaaki Nakayama (2007- 2008)
- Hachigatsu no Cinderella Nine S - transferred to Manga Cross
- Geniearth by Rensuke Oshikiri
- Harigane Service
- Harigane Service Ace
- Hungry Heart: Wild Striker
- Ippon Again! - transferred to Manga Cross
- Iron Wok Jan
- Jitsu wa Watashi wa
- Kaze ga Gotoku
- Koe ga Dasenai Shōjo wa "Kanojo ga Yasashisugiru" to Omotte Iru
- Low Teen Blues
- Magical Girl Site - transferred from Champion Tap!
- Meika-san wa Oshi Korosenai - transferred to Manga Cross
- Mirai Keisatsu Urashiman
- Mitsudomoe
- Muteki Kanban Musume
- My-Hime
- My-Otome
- Nanaka 6/17
- Nine Peaks - transferred to Manga Cross
- Penguin Musume
- Plawres Sanshiro
- Rainbow Parakeet
- Rokudou no Onna-tachi
- Saint Seiya: Next Dimension
- Saint Seiya: The Lost Canvas
- Sanda
- s-CRY-ed
- Seven of Seven
- Shūkan Shōnen Hachi
- Shūjin Riku
- Shy
- Squid Girl
- Sugarless
- Super Radical Gag Family
- Uchū Jūbe (肥前屋兵衛, "Treasure Hunter Jubei") by Hitoshi Tomizawa (1994–1995)
- Yuuyake Banchō
- Zenikko
