= List of Beastars chapters =

First volume of Beastars, released in Japan by Akita Shoten on January 6, 2017.

Beastars is a manga series set in a world inhabited by modern, civilized, anthropomorphic animals, where a cultural divide exists between carnivores and herbivores. The series derives its name from the in-universe title of "Beastar," which is given to individuals of exceptional talent, service, and notoriety. The story primarily revolves around Legoshi a gray wolf, as he grapples with his feelings of attraction towards Haru, a rabbit. Paru Itagaki launched the manga in Akita Shoten's Weekly Shōnen Champion magazine on September 8, 2016.

In a September 2019 interview with the Spanish website Ramen Para Dos, Itagaki stated that the manga would have "at most twenty volumes". In January 2020, Itagaki commented that the "end is in sight". The manga concluded with its 196th chapter on October 8, 2020. Akita Shoten has compiled its chapters into twenty-two individual tankōbon volumes. The first volume was released on January 6, 2017, and the final volume, the 22nd volume, was released on January 8, 2021. During their panel at Anime NYC 2018, Viz Media announced that they have licensed the manga. The first volume was released on July 16, 2019.

== Volumes ==
No.	Original release date	Original ISBN	English release date	English ISBN
1	January 6, 2017	978-4-253-22754-4	July 16, 2019	978-1-9747-0798-0
Start of the arc "Drama Club" (「演劇部」, "Engeki-bu"). (volumes 1-2/chapters 1-17/episodes 1-5): 1. "Introduction upon the Full Moon" (満月なのでご紹介します, Mangetsu na no de goshōkai shimasu); 2. "Rubing Each Other the Wrong Way" (少年たちの逆撫で, Shōnen-tachi no sakanade); 3. "A Warning in the Mist" (霧の中の警鐘, Kiri no naka no keishō); 4. "A Pretty Bad Day Even for Rabbits" (ウサギ史上でもかなり悪い日, Usagi-shijō de mo kanari warui hi); 5. "Hey, It's Us!" (ねぇ僕らだよ, Nē boku-ra da yo); 6. "The Beasts' First-Magnitude Star" (ケモノたちの一等星, Kemono-tachi no ittō-sei); 7. "Game Preserve Level 100" (禁猟区レベル100, Kinryō-ku reberu hyaku)
The horrible murder of Tem the alpaca shocks the inhabitants of Cherryton Academy, a place so far full of hope, love and a certain uneasiness.
2	April 7, 2017	978-4-253-22755-1	September 17, 2019	978-1-9747-0799-7
8. "Sighs of the Surrogate Mother" (ゴッドマザーのため息, Goddomazā no tameiki); 9. "The Wind Rises (Where No One Can Feel It Blow)" (風立ちぬ（ただし見えない所で）, Kaze tachinu (Tadashi mienai tokoro de)); 10. "Keep Your Secrets Backstage" (プライバシーは舞台裏に, Puraibashī wa butaiura ni); 11. "Feels like Glass in the Gums" (歯茎にガラス, Haguki ni garasu); 12. "Dazzling Dictatorship" (まぶしき独裁, Mabushiki dokusai); 13. "Yin and Yang Stripes" (陰と陽、シマシマ, In to yō, shimashima); 14. "On the Scent of the Holy Grail" (聖杯の匂い, Seihai no nioi); 15. "Camaraderie" (仲間の証、温かく, Nakama no akashi, atatakaku); 16. "Scorching Punishments" (君を焦がす制歳, Kimi o kogasu seisai)
The drama club's actor leader, red deer Louis, has an ardent ambition: to take advantage of the imminent welcoming performance to climb to the heroic "Beastar" stand, the climax of coexistence and co-prosperity between carnivores and herbivores.
3	May 8, 2017	978-4-253-22756-8	November 19, 2019	978-1-9747-0800-0
Start of the arc "Meteor Festival" (「隕石祭」, "Inseki-sai"). (volumes 3-6/chapters 18-49/episodes 6-12): 17. "He Howls "No" like a Child " (遠吠えのイヤイヤ症候群, Tōboe no iya-iya shōkōgun); 18. "The Beasts' Summer Festival of the Meteor" (獣の盆、彼らが夏, Kemono no bon, kare-ra ga natsu); 19. "The Name of the Howling Boy" (ガウガウ君の名は, Gau-gau kimi no na wa); 20. "The Client Next Door" (隣のクライアント, Tonari no kuraianto); 21. "Resonating with the Outside World" (外界との共鳴, Gaikai to no kyōmei); 22. "Shadows of Tall Buildings" (建ち並ぶビルの影, Tachinarabu biru no kage); 23. "Shattered on the Stairway to Adulthood" (おとなの階段に散る, Otona no kaidan ni chiru); 24. "The Reality Captured in Photographs" (現像されたリアルたち, Genzō sareta Riaru-tachi); 25. "I'm in Tears and I Hate Everything" (視界は滲むし全部嫌だ, Shikai wa nijimushi zenbu iya da)
The students of Cherryton Academy are prepared with enthusiasm for the great event of the summer, the Meteorite Festival, and Legoshi, together with several companions, goes to the city...
4	July 7, 2017	978-4-253-22757-5	January 21, 2020	978-1-9747-0801-7
26. "That Day with Mister Bambi" (あの日ミス夕ーバンビと, Ano hi Misutā Banbi to); 27. "Look, We're Perfect Together" (ジャストフィットを見てよ, Jasutofitto o mite yo); 28. "His Feelings Are Richly Colored" (その感情、極彩色, Sono kanjō, gokusaishiki); 29. "Fresh Subway Winds" (地下鉄の風はみずみずしい, Chikatetsu no kaze wa mizumizushī); 30. "The Iron Tamer" (鉄の猛獣使い, Tetsu no mōjūdzukai); 31. "Her Ambition Is Shocking Pink" (野望はショッキングピンク, Yabō wa shokkingupinku); 32. "Then Will You Turn the Lights Off?" (なら電気を消して, Nara denki o keshite); 33. "I Swear I'll Rise Up" (宣誓⋯上へまいります, Sensei...-jō e mairimasu); 34. "Secret Bodyguard" (ボディガードは神妙に, Bodigādo wa shinmyō ni)
Legoshi is still dazzled by Haru. But Haru really likes another... And then there's Juno, who sighs for Legoshi. Loves of adolescence that intertwine...
5	October 6, 2017	978-4-253-22758-2	March 17, 2020	978-1-9747-0802-4
35. "For the Sake of Physiologie du Goût" (美味礼讃のため, Bimiraisan no tame); 36. "What Spills Over from His Fists" (こぶしの縁に寄せて, Kobushi no en ni yosete); 37. "Guided by Rain Clouds" (雨雲に引き連れられて, Amagumo ni hikitsurerarete); 38. "White Fur on Ruled Lines" (罫線に白い毛這わせて, Keisen ni shiroi ke hawa sete); 39. "I Want to Capture You" (君を捕まえたい, Kimi o tsukamaetai); 40. "My Lungs Are Filled with Your Scent More than My Heart Is Filled with Emotion" (胸いっぱいより肺いっぱい, Mune-ippai yori hai-ippai); 41. "A Large Carnivore's Sense of Loyalty" (大型忠誠心, Ōgata chūsei kokoro); 42. "The Two of Us in This Intense Night" (味が濃い夜に僕ら2匹, Aji ga koi yoru ni boku-ra ni-biki); 43. "A Young Male's Instincts" (オートマチック青年, Ōtomachikku seinen)
Juno and Louis face each other as the Meteor Festival approaches. The silent fight of the carnivorous beasts and the herbivorous beasts began with the aim of becoming the next Beastars.
6	December 9, 2017	978-4-253-22759-9	May 19, 2020	978-1-9747-0803-1
44. "Tightly Held in Lukewarm Sweat" (温い汗に固められ, Nukui ase ni katamerare); 45. "The Black Hole Behind the Eyelashes" (睫毛の奥のブラックホール, Matsuge no oku no burakku hōru); 46. "She Rules by Contrast" (コントラストで支配せよ, Kontorasuto de shihai seyo); 47. "Only the Sea Breeze Knows" (潮風だけが知っている, Shiokaze dake ga shitte iru); 48. "Everyone Disperses in Late Summer" (残暑 各々に散らばって, Zansho onōno ni chirabatte); 49. "Children, Jump over Ancient Times" (古代を飛び越せ子どもたち, Kodai o tobikose kodomo-tachi); 50. "Othello of Flames" (炎のオセロ, Honō no Osero); 51. "Life Tastes Heavy as Lead" (生命の味は重い鉛, Seimei no aji wa omoi namari); 52. "Two Dangerous Egoists" (危険なエゴイスト2匹, Kiken'na egoisuto ni-hiki)
Legoshi rescued Haru from the Shishigumi after the fierce fight. On the way home with Haru, they missed the last train from the station and are forced to stay at a hotel.
7	February 8, 2018	978-4-253-22760-5	July 21, 2020	978-1-9747-0804-8
Start of the arc "Murder Incident Solution" (「食殺事件」, "Shokusatsu jiken"). (volumes 7-11/chapters 50-99/episodes 13-24): 53. "The Cornered Rat Bites the Cat" (強鼠なので猫を噛む, Tsuyo nezumi na no de neko o kamu); 54. "Straining to Hear Thin Smoke" (細い煙に耳澄ませ, Hosoi kemuri ni mimi sumase); 55. "Because Eve Ate the Apple" (イブはリンゴを食べたから, Ibu wa ringo o tabeta kara); 56. "Temptation by the Savior" (救世主の誘惑, Kyūseiju no yūwaku); 57. "Their Hearts Simply Drew Closer Together" (ただ心臓が寄り添った, Tada shinzō ga yori sotta); 58. "Dripping Milk in Black Coffee" (ブラックコーヒーにミルク垂れた, Burakku kōhī ni miruku tareta); 59. "What the Devotee Lives For" (信徒の生き甲斐, Shinto no ikigai); 60. "The Deep World of Philanthropism" (博愛主義のディープワールド, Hakuai shugi no dīpu wārudo); 61. "The Moon Is Out—Now You'll Become a Moth Drawn to Its Light" (月だ君は蛾になる, Tsuki da kimi wa ga ni naru)
Legoshi swore to make himself strong to make Haru happy. Louis is the head of the Shishigumi, and he is controlling the Black Market.
8	May 8, 2018	978-4-253-22761-2	September 15, 2020	978-1-9747-0805-5
62. "Determination Can Be Bleached" (覚悟は漂白可能, Kakugo wa hyō hakuka nō); 63. "Grease, Then Light a Fire!" (油をひいて火をつけろ！, Abura o hīte hi wo tsukero!); 64. "The Dancer Without Pointe Shoes" (踊り子にトウシューズはない, Odoriko ni toushūzu wanai); 65. "The Value of Virtual Genes" (仮想遺伝子の値打ち, Kasō idenshi no neuchi); 66. "A Star in the Stormy Night, Cold Autumn Night Mourns for the Dead" (荒星の弔い, Ara boshi no tomurai); 67. "Electricity Passes Through Rows of Fangs" (電流通う牙の列, Denryū kayou kiba no retsu); 68. "Greetings, Cold Lips and Blazing Hands" (ご挨拶冷えた口元燃える手に, Goaisatsu hieta kuchimoto moeru te ni); 69. "Their String-Can Telephone Isn't Working" (糸電話の回線乱れております, Itodenwa no daisen midarete orimasu); 70. "Cradle of Civilization" (文明のゆりかご, Bunmei no yuri kago)
Louis, who became head of the Shishigumi, decided to explore the truth of this world from another perspective, while suffering the difference with the society of carnivorous beasts.
9	July 6, 2018	978-4-253-22762-9	November 17, 2020	978-1-9747-0806-2
71. "A Day Among Many" (僕らの日々の中の1日, Boku-ra no hibi no naka no ichi-nichi); 72. "You'll Be Burned by White Flames" (白炎にヤケドするぜ, Hakuen ni yakedo suru ze); 73. "A Well-Bred "Wolf"" (毛並みのよい"オオカミ", Kenami no yoi "ōkami"); 74. "You're a Solitary Knight" (君はぼっちのナイト, Kimi wa botchi no naito); 75. "Roll Back Time with Your Pendulum Clock" (君の振り子時計で巻き戻して, Kimi no furiko dokei de maki modoshite); 76. "Rhapsody of Requesting the Impossible" (ないものねだり狂想曲, Naimono nedari kyōsō kyoku); 77. "Honey Hunt's Pure Heart" (ハニーハントの純情, Hanīhanto no junjō); 78. "Pesticide-Free Orchard" (無農薬の果樹園, Mu nōyaku no kajuen); 79. "Secret Encounter with Lingerie" (ランジェリーの密会, Ranjerī no mikkai)
Legoshi, who was attacked and defeated by someone, is practicing with Gohin every day to become stronger.
10	September 7, 2018	978-4-253-22763-6	January 19, 2021	978-1-9747-0924-3
80. "Picking and Choosing Smiles" (ほほえみの取捨選択, Hohoemi no shushasentaku); 81. "Eyes like Two Side-by-Side Pieces of Lacquerware" (漆の器が2つ並んだような眼, Urushi no utsuwa ga futatsu naranda yō na me); 82. "Across the Universe" (アクロス ザ ユニバース, Akurosu za Yunibāsu); 83. "An Ordinary Hug Handled by a Futon" (ただの抱擁は布団にでも託します, Tada no hōyō wa futon ni de mo takushimasu); 84. "Turbulent Air Swirling Around Those Hands" (その手 乱気流 巻いて, Sono te rankiryū maite); 85. "Will Our Blood Not Flow Together Even in the Sewer?" (僕らの血は下水でも分離しているだろうか, Boku-ra no chi wa gesui de mo bunri shite iru darō ka); 86. "A Comet in the Depths" (この深淵に箒星, Kono shin'en ni hōkiboshi); 87. "Best Supporting Actor Award for the New Star" (新星、助演男優賞, Shinsei, joen dan'yūshō); 88. "An Intense Woman" (淑女 大暴走, Shukujo dai bōsō)
The real culprit in the Tem case was close to home!
11	November 8, 2018	978-4-253-22764-3	March 16, 2021	978-1-9747-0925-0
89. "Grime on the Chopping Block After the Dream" (まな板の汚れ 夢のあと, Manaita no yogore yume no ato); 90. "The Old Year Passes Away, the New Year Enters the Soul" (この魂に ゆく年くる年, Kono tamashī ni yuku toshi kuru toshi); 91. "Howls of the Guardian Angel" (守護神の遠吠えが, Shugoshin no tōboe ga); 92. "You Are the King of the Beasts" (君は百獣のプリンス, Kimi wa hyakujū no purinsu); 93. "Pluck the Golden Hairs from the Shirt and Place Them into Your Pocket" (シャツに付いた金の毛をポケットに入れて, Shatsu ni tsuita kin no ke o poketto ni irete); 94. "Beasts' School Wars" (ビースツ スクール☆ウォーズ, Bīsutsu Sukūru Uōzu); 95. "Eighteenfold Concentrated Drop" (18倍濃縮の雫, Jū-hachibai nōshuku no shizuku); 96. "Sealing the Pledge with Vermilion Ink" (紅の断面 君に捧ぐ, Beni no danmen kimi ni sasagu); 97. "They Served Us a Feast" (僕ら馳走にあずかった, Boku-ra chisō ni azukatta)
Legoshi is trying to solve the case of Tem and meets Riz in the locker room, who is trying to shut his mouth.
12	February 8, 2019	978-4-253-22765-0	May 18, 2021	978-1-9747-1254-0
Start of the arc "Interspecies Relations" (「種間関係」, "Shunkan kankei"). (volumes 12-14/chapters 100-123/episodes -): 98. "Meeting Myself Eye to Eye 20 Years in the Future" (20数年後の自分と目が合った, Nijū sū nengo no jibun to me ga atta); 99. "The Blue-Furred Big Shot" (青毛の巨頭, Aoge no kyotō); 100. "When the Train Is Packed" (満員電車がパンクすると⋯, Man'in densha ga panku suru to...); 101. "Condition for Rental—Find a Stray Dog" (居住条件：野良犬を拾うこと, Kyojū jōken: Nora inu o hirou koto); 102. "Has He Been Consumed by Flames?" (燃やし尽くした黒さなのか 彼の身体は, Moyashi tsukushita kurosa na no ka: kare no karada wa); 103. "Rainfall After Seeds Are Sown" (タネが撒かれれば雨が降る, Tane ga makarere ba ame ga furu); 104. "A Lethal Dose of Love Tastes of Marmalade" (致死量の愛はママレード味, Chishi ryō no ai wa mamarēdo aji); 105. "The Man of Destiny Is Devoured" (食べられる運命の男, Taberareru unmei no otoko); 106. "Moonlight Reflected in Twinkling Scales" (月光をも反射してしまう鱗の瞬きよ, Gekkō o mo hansha shite shimau uroko no mabataki yo)
The culprit of the murder case of Tem, the final battle of New Year's Eve against Riz.
13	April 8, 2019	978-4-253-22766-7	July 20, 2021	978-1-9747-1253-3
107. "Sanpaku Eyes Inherit Lovers' Talk" (三白眼に継がれし痴話, Sanpakugan ni tsugareshi chiwa); 108. "Caribbean Neighbor" (ご近所カリビアン, Gokinjo Karibian); 109. "Oxygen-Poor Encounter with a Mermaid" (酸素うすき逢瀬 人魚と, Sanso usuki ōse ningyo to); 110. "I Don't Know What Beer Tastes Like" (俺はビールの味を知らない, Ore wa bīru no aji o shiranai); 111. "Sharp Eyes like Polished Marbles Turn to Frosted Glass" (ビー玉の視界はやがて磨りガラスに, Bīdama no shikai wa yagate suri garasu ni); 112. "Covered with Detoxifying Mist" (浴びて 解毒のミスト, Abite gedoku no misuto); 113. "A Selfish Body That Knows Purity " (純度を知るわがままボディ, Jundo o shiru wagamama bodi); 114. "My Friend, May I Prostrate Myself Before You?" (友よ 舌根からひれ伏してもよいか, Tomo yo zekkon kara hirefushite mo yoi ka); 115. "Just One Apartment on the Surface of the Moon" (今夜の我、あの子よりもウサギらしい（さぁ食べて食べて）, Kon'ya no ware, ano ko yori mo usagi-rashī (Sā tabete tabete))
14	July 8, 2019	978-4-253-22767-4	September 21, 2021	978-1-9747-1993-8
116. "Dancing Thoughts in a Pup's Head" (思考回路のDancing Boy, Shikō kairo no Danshingu Bōi); 117. "Altar of Beta-Carotene" (ベータカロテンの祭壇, Bēta-karoten no saidan); 118. "Empty Machine Gun Chamber" (弾を抜いた機関銃, Tama o nuita kikanjū); 119. "Lukewarm Water Turns Cold When Spilled" (ぬるま湯をぶち撒ければ、冷水に, Nurumayu o buchimakere ba, reisui ni); 120. "Is That Wail at Dusk The First Cry of a Newborn?" (夕暮れの叫びは産声か, Yūgure no sakebi wa ubugoe ka); 121. "I Climb the Narrow Waist of the Hourglass with You" (砂時計のくびれ 君とのぼる, Sunadokei no kubire kimi to noboru); 122. "If You Listen Closely to the Requiem, It's Actually a Hymn" (鎮魂歌に耳を澄ませば賛美歌, Chinkonka ni mimi o sumase ba sanbika); 123. "Our Tails are Afterimages Seared in Our Memories" (互いのしっぽ、脳裡に焼きつく残像のみ, Tagai no shippo, nōri ni yaki tsuku zanzō nomi); 124. "The More Colors You Mix Together, the Blacker Your Paint Turns" (絵の具 混色するほど黒ずむ, Enogu konshoku suru hodo kurozumu)
15	October 10, 2019	978-4-253-22903-6	November 16, 2021	978-1-9747-1994-5
Start of the arc "Revenge of the Love Failure" (「愛の失敗作の復讐」, "Ai no shippai-saku no fukushū"). (volumes 15-22/chapters 124-196/episodes -): 125. "A Threatening Letter Wrapped Like a Gift Sent by a Monster" (モンスターからの脅迫状にのし飾り, Monsutā kara no kefu haku jiyau ni noshi kazari); 126. "A Devil's Prayer as an Ill Omen" (悪魔の祈りは、不吉なことの予兆らしい, Akuma no inori wa, fukitsu na koto no yochō rashī); 127. "Spots like an Imaginary Beast Beneath a Mirror Ball" (幻獣のような斑点模様、ミラーボールの下, Genjū no yō na hanten moyō, mirābōru no shita); 128. "Do Not Mix—Will Create Toxic Fumes" (ガスが発生するので「混ぜるな危険」, Gasu ga hassei suru no de "mazeru na kiken"); 129. "Jumping out of Bed from a Dream of Annunciation" (受胎告知の夢から飛び起きて, Jutai kokuchi no yume kara tobi okite); 130. "The Lead-Gray Color of His Prosthetic Leg Occasionally Shines like a Rainbow" (義足の鉛色、たまに虹色に光る, Gisoku no namarīro, tama ni nijīro ni hikaru); 131. "Making a Catnip Flower Crown by Force" (またたびで無理やり花冠, Matatabi de muriyari kakan); 132. "When You Call My Name, It Sounds like a Posthmous Buddhist Name" (あなたの声で呼ばれるとまるで戒名のようで, Anata no koe de yobareru tomaru de kaimyō no yō de); 133. "The Beach Gets Swallowed Up when the Tide Comes In" (潮が満ちれば砂浜は呑まれるよ, Shio ga michireba sunahama wa nomareru yo)
16	December 6, 2019	978-4-253-22904-3	January 18, 2022	978-1-9747-1995-2
134. "Final Contact" (ファイナル・コンタクト, Fainaru Kontakuto); 135. "Sweet Clouds of Steam and Green Japanese Peppercorns" (あまき湯けむりと青山椒, Amaki yukemuri to ao sanshō); 136. "A Shredded Drinking Straw Is Our EKG" (ズタズタのストロー、私たちの心電図, Zuta-zuta no sutorō, watashi-tachi no shindenzu); 137. "Departure from Shangri-La" (桃源郷からの船出, Tōgenkyō kara no funade); 138. "A Fleeting 21,500 Years" (刹那的21500年, Setsuna teki nijū-ichi go-hyaku nen); 139. "The Crimson Sky, Plowing the Field" (茜射す空 畑を駆け, Akanesasu sora: hata o kake); 140. "Training an Actor to Perform Tragedy" (トラジェディーにおける演技指導, Torajedī ni okeru engi shidō); 141. "Trapping a Mermaid's Song in a Bubble" (泡に宿して 人魚の唄, Awa ni yado shite ningyo no uta); 142. "Beasts Can Live as Long as a Century Now?!" (獣生100年時代⁉, Jūnama hyakunen jidai!?)
17	January 8, 2020	978-4-253-22905-0	March 15, 2022	978-1-9747-1996-9
143. "A Chest So Thin the Light from a Monitor Passes Through It" (TVの光にもすかされるうすき胸, Terebi no hikari ni mosu ka sareru usuki mune); 144. "I Am a Felidae" (吾輩は猫科である, Wagahai wa nekoka de aru); 145. "A Body Without a Private Life" (プライベートを持たぬ肉体, Puraibēto o motanu nikutai); 146. "El Niño Occurred in My Desert" (俺の砂漠にエルニーニョ現象起きた, Ore no sabaku ni Eru Nīnyo genshō okita); 147. "Speak Your Words of Love After Wiping Off Your Drool" (愛の言葉はヨダレを拭いてから, Ai no kotoba wa yodare o fuite kara); 148. "I Thought It Would Always Be Morning when I Awoke" (目が覚めたら朝はくると思っていた, Me ga sametara asa kuru to omotte ita); 149. "The Second Coming of the White Fox" (白狐再臨, Byakko sairin); 150. "Oh, My Big Daddy!" (オー・マイ・ビッグ・ダディ！, Ō Mai Biggu Dadi!); 151. "Enjoy While Listening to "Comedians' Gallop" as Your Background Music" (「道化師のギャロップ」をBGMにお楽しみください, "Dōkeshi no gyaroppu" o Bī Jī Emu ni wo tanoshimi kudasai)
18	April 8, 2020	978-4-253-22906-7	May 17, 2022	978-1-9747-2112-2
152. "Are the Scratches on the Walls the School Building's Cry for Help?" (校舎の自傷行為なのでは？壁の爪痕, Kōsha no jishōkōi na no de wa? Kabe no tsume ato); 153. "The Howl of a Lost Dog Is a Haunting Tune" (負け犬の遠吠え よきしらべ, Makeinu no tōboe: yoki shirabe); 154. "Teacher Jack's History Lesson" (ジャックせんせーの歴史学教室, Jakku-sensei no rekishigaku kyōshitsu); 155. "An Egg Yolk Forever in Your Heart" (心に永遠の卵黄を, Kokoro ni eien no ran'ō wo); 156. "But the Time Bomb Sleeping" (時限爆弾は眠りをすすってたのに, Jigen bakudan wa nemuri o susutteta no ni); 157. "Adler Without a Blackout" (暗転もせず現れしアドラー, Anten mo sezu arawareshi Adorā); 158. "I've Never Heard That Before" (聞いたこともない言葉だが, Kīta koto mo nai kotoba da ga); 159. "Innocent Along the Dotted Lines" (無垢だからキリトリ線に従って, Muku da kara kiritori-sen ni shitagatte); 160. "Allegedly a Good Son" (孝行息子の疑い, Kōkō musuko no utagai)
19	July 8, 2020	978-4-253-22907-4	July 19, 2022	978-1-9747-2604-2
161. "What You Don't Know Can't Hurt You" (「イフ」・ユー・ネバー・ノウ, "Ifu" Yū Nebā Nō); 162. "Early Afternoon for a Good Wife and Wise Mother" (良妻賢母の昼下がり, Ryōsai kenbo no hirusagari); 163. "Don't Look Down or Your Fur Will Fall in Your Eyes" (下を向くな毛先が目に入るから, Shita o mukuna kesaki ga me ni hairu kara); 164. "Just a Single TearDrop from Asura Is Enough" (阿修羅の涙一滴ただそれだけで, Ashura no namida ichi-teki tada sore dake de); 165. "The Answer to Chapter 65 Equals Error" (第65話のこたえはERROR, Dai rokujūgo-wa no kotae wa erā); 166. "Give Me the Destiny I Deserve" (身の丈の運命わたしにください, Minotake no unmei watashi ni kudasai); 167. "Crazy Party Quiz Show" (クレイジー・パーティー・クイズ・ショー, Kureijī Pātī Kuizu Shō); 168. "Both of Their Final Answers" (両社のファイナルアンサー, Ryōsha no fainaru ansā); 169. "Who Says He's Just a Giraffe Meat Sausage?" (麒麟肉のフランクフルトなんて言ったのだれ, Kirin-niku no Furankufuruto nante itta no dare)
20	August 6, 2020	978-4-253-22908-1	September 20, 2022	978-1-9747-2605-9
170. "Infinite Table Manners" (無限のテーブルマナー, Mugen no tēburu manā); 171. "Blackmail While Staring at Her Lips" (唇見つめて恐喝してる, Kuchibiru mitsumete kyōkatsu shiteru); 172. "Rexmas Red" (レクスマスカラーの〝赤〟, Rekusumasukarā no〝aka〟); 173. "Thawing xxxx" (雪解けの××××, Yuki doke no ××××); 174. "Heroic Tale of Blood Spray" (血飛沫飛翔英雄譚, Chishibuki hishō eiyū-tan); 175. "Fire Meet Gasoline" (ファイア・ミート・ガソリン, Faia Mīto Gasorin); 176. "Light Glints off Arms Covered with Scales" (鱗腕の中 光の乱反射, Uroko ude no naka hikari no ran hansha); 177. "Invitation to Surfing Tonight" (今宵サーフィンに誘われて, Koyoi sāfin ni sasowarete); 178. "Remote Battle" (リモート・バトル, Rimōto Batoru)
21	October 8, 2020	978-4-253-22909-8	November 15, 2022	978-1-9747-2606-6
179. "The Power Beneath Your Heels" (かかと直下型パワー, Kaka to chokka-gata pawā); 180. "It's a Full Moon, so Let Me Handle This" (満月なのでおまかせを, Mangetsu na no de o makase wo); 181. "The Leopard Floats like a Film of Oil" (浮かぶ油膜のようなレオパード, Ukabu yumaku no yō na reopādo); 182. "Who Did You See in That Sunset After School?" (あの日通学路の夕焼けを誰と見た？, Ano hi tsūgakuro no yūyake o dare to mita?); 183. "A Planetarium Just for Us" (俺たちだけのプラネタリウム, Ore-tachi dake no puranetariumu); 184. "Watching Flowers Bloom and Bear Fruit" (花が咲き実がなり僕らはそれを眺めてる, Hana ga saki mi ga nari boku-ra wa sore o nagameteru); 185. "Rescuing the Prince from the Electric Tower" (電工の塔からプリンス奪還, Denkō no tō kara purinsu dakkan); 186. "A Jet-Black Parachute Opened Today" (この日のために開く真っ黒なパラシュート, Kono hi no tame ni hiraku makkuro na parashūto); 187. "A Study of Lightning-Quick Moves" (「脱兎のごとく」の考察, "Datto no gotoku" no kōsatsu)
22	January 8, 2021	978-4-253-22910-4	January 17, 2023	978-1-9747-2607-3
188. "Raising the Hand That Has Never Stroked Anyone" (撫でたこともない手で挙手, Nadeta koto mo nai te de kyoshu); 189. "A Rose Withered from Too Much Fertilizer" (過剰な栄養剤で枯れた薔薇, Kajōna eiyōzai de kareta bara); 190. "You Become the Stars" (星たちになれ, Hoshi-tachi ni nare); 191. "If You Were Melon of Year 2, Class C" (もし君が2年C組のメロンくんだったなら, Moshi kimi ga ni-nen shī-gumi no Meron-kun datta nara); 192. "The Path of Evil" (悪の獣道, Aku no kemonomichi); 193. "Part of Your World" (パート オブ ユア ワールド, Pāto obu Yua Wārudo); 194. "Eternity Until Every Window Goes Dark" (すべての窓が暗くなるまでの永遠, Subete no mado ga kuraku naru made no eien); 195. "Last Duel Between Mammals" (哺乳類最後の一騎打ち, Honyūrui saigo no ni-ki uchi); 196. "The Tale of a Wolf and a Rabbit" (オオカミとウサギの話, Ōkami to usagi no hanashi)
