= Chikahiro Kobayashi =

Japanese actor and voice actor

- 小林 親弘
- Born: September 5, 1983 (age 43); Aichi Prefecture, Japan
- Occupations: Actor; voice actor
- Years active: 2007–present
- Agent: Atomic Monkey
- Notable work: Golden Kamuy as Saichi Sugimoto; Beastars as Legoshi

Chikahiro Kobayashi (小林 親弘, Kobayashi Chikahiro) is a Japanese actor and voice actor. In 2007, he joined Yen Theater Research Institute before he promoted to Drama Group Yen Membership. He is best known for voicing Saichi Sugimoto in Golden Kamuy and Legoshi in Beastars.

== Filmography ==
=== Television animation ===
2013

- Gundam Build Fighters, Server
- Gifuu Doudou!!: Kanetsugu to Keiji, Allied soldiers
- Mushibugyō, Yumehisa Sakaki
- Gingitsune, Member

2014

- HappinessCharge PreCure!, Chairman Kariyazaki
- Chaika - The Coffin Princess, Soldier
- Mushishi, Father Kaoru
- Yo-kai Watch, The Couple

2015

- Gundam Reconguista in G, Staff, Pilot
- Gin Tama, Newscaster

2016

- Poco's Udon World, Kiuchi
- The Kindaichi Case Files, Hiiragi Shinichirou

2017

- Granblue Fantasy The Animation, Skyfarer B
- Duel Masters, Jolly the Johnny, Loud "NYZ" Noisy

2018

- Violet Evergarden, Toby Selwyn
- Golden Kamuy, Saichi Sugimoto
- Amanchu!, Macho
- Full Metal Panic! Invisible Victory, Alastor
- 100 Sleeping Princes and the Kingdom of Dreams, Bucks
- That Time I Got Reincarnated as a Slime, Ranga

2019

- Cop Craft, Assistant Gardner Attorney
- Is It Wrong to Try to Pick Up Girls in a Dungeon?, Ares
- Lupin the Third: Prison of the Past, Balmer's younger brother
- Beastars, Legoshi
- Fire Force, The Assault

2020

- Id:Invaded, Haruka Kazuta
- Ahiru no Sora, Kashiwagi Kazushi
- Sing "Yesterday" for Me, Rikuo Uozumi
- The God of High School, Commissioner R
- Great Pretender, Clark Ibrahim
- Golden Kamuy Season 3, Saichi Sugimoto
- Sleepy Princess in the Demon Castle, Red Siberian

2021

- Beastars Season 2, Legoshi
- That Time I Got Reincarnated as a Slime Season 2, Ranga
- Megalobox 2: Nomad, Sakuma
- Joran: The Princess of Snow and Blood, Jin Kuzuhara
- The Slime Diaries: That Time I Got Reincarnated as a Slime, Ranga
- Night Head 2041, Mikie Fujiki
- Scarlet Nexus (2021), Kaito Sumeragi
- Dragon Quest: The Adventure of Dai, Sigma

2022

- Aoashi, Tatsuya Fukuda
- Golden Kamuy Season 4, Saichi Sugimoto

2023

- Malevolent Spirits, Nagi
- Trigun Stampede, Monev the Gale
- Hell's Paradise: Jigokuraku, Yamada Asaemon Shion
- The Legendary Hero Is Dead!, Leland Tallman
- Sacrificial Princess and the King of Beasts, Jormungand
- The Devil Is a Part-Timer!!, Camael

2024

- 'Tis Time for "Torture," Princess, Ex
- Shinkalion: Change the World, Kadomichi Takanawa
- Days with My Stepsister, Taichi Asamura
- The Prince of Tennis II: U-17 World Cup Semifinal, Ken Lendoll
- Kinnikuman: Perfect Origin Arc, Max Radial
- Blue Lock vs. U-20 Japan, Gen Fukaku

2025

- Black Butler: Emerald Witch Arc, Wolfram
- The Fragrant Flower Blooms with Dignity, Makoto Tsukada
- The Summer Hikaru Died, Tanaka
- Wandance, Assei

2026

- Easygoing Territory Defense by the Optimistic Lord, Dee
- The Ghost in the Shell, Lee

2027

- Wound & Bandage, Gō Kiritani

=== Original video animation (OVA) ===
- Mushibugyō (2014), Yumehisa Sakaki
- Golden Kamuy (2019), Saichi Sugimoto
- Code Geass: Rozé of the Recapture (2024), Kaoru Shizuka

=== Original net animation ===
- Blade of the Immortal -Immortal- (2019), Shinriji
- The Way of the Househusband (2021), Hirono
- JoJo's Bizarre Adventure: Stone Ocean (2021), Lang Rangler
- Thermae Romae Novae (2022), Marcus
- Exception (2022), Lewis
- Dandelion (2026), Tetsuo Tanba

=== Anime films ===
- Burn the Witch (2020), Bruno Bangnyfe
- That Time I Got Reincarnated as a Slime the Movie: Scarlet Bond (2022), Ranga
- The First Slam Dunk (2022), Yohei Mito
- Patlabor EZY: File 1 (2026), Akihiko Hazama
- Patlabor EZY: File 2 (2026), Akihiko Hazama
- Patlabor EZY: File 3 (2027), Akihiko Hazama
- Doraemon: Nobita's Steam-Powered Time Machine (2027), Welson

=== Dubbing ===
==== Live-action ====
- 1917, Cpl.William Schofield (George MacKay)
- 47 Ronin, Young Oishi
- Absentia, Tommy Gibbs (Angel Bonanni)
- The Age of Adaline, Ellis Jones (Michiel Huisman)
- American Made, JB (Caleb Landry Jones)
- Annie, Simon Goodspeed (Ashton Kutcher)
- Babylon, Manuel "Manny" Torres (Diego Calva)
- Batman v Superman: Dawn of Justice, Barry Allen / The Flash (Ezra Miller)
- Beauty and the Beast, Jean-Baptiste
- The BFG, Mr. Tibbs (Rafe Spall)
- Blackway, Nate (Alexander Ludwig)
- Blue Story, Marco (Michael Ward)
- Bohemian Rhapsody, Bob Geldof (Dermot Murphy)
- Carrie, Jackie (Max Topplin)
- Child 44, Vasili Nikitin (Joel Kinnaman)
- City on a Hill, Anton Campbell (Shannon Wallace)
- Cold Comes the Night, Donnie (Leo Fitzpatrick)
- Crisis on Earth-X, Winn Schott (Jeremy Jordan)
- Debris, Efraim Muñoz
- Escape from Mogadishu, Kang Dae-jin (Zo In-sung)
- Fantastic Beasts and Where to Find Them, Langdon Shaw (Ronan Raftery)
- Fathers and Daughters, Cameron (Aaron Paul)
- Flight 7500, Brad Martin (Ryan Kwanten)
- The Gallows, Reese Houser (Reese Mishler)
- Godzilla: King of the Monsters, Sam Coleman (Thomas Middleditch)
- Happy Together, Chang (Chen Chang)
- John Wick: Chapter 3 – Parabellum, Earl (Tobias Segal)
- Katy Keene, Alexander Cabot (Lucien Laviscount)
- Left Behind, Cameron "Buck" Williams (Chad Michael Murray)
- Legends of Tomorrow, John Constantine (Matt Ryan)
- The Lord of the Rings: The Rings of Power, Elendil (Lloyd Owen)
- The Love Punch, Vincent Kruger (Laurent Lafitte)
- Marcel the Shell with Shoes On, Dean (Dean Fleischer Camp)
- The Mustang, Henry (Jason Mitchell)
- Night at the Museum: Secret of the Tomb, Amir (Patrick Sabongui)
- Night of the Living Dead, Tom (Keith Wayne)
- Novocaine, Simon Greenly (Ray Nicholson)
- Pete's Dragon, Abner
- Raised by Wolves, Father (Abubakar Salim)
- Rebel Moon, Gunnar (Michiel Huisman)
- Sabotage, Agent Spolcheck (Troy Garity)
- Snake Eyes, Tommy Arashikage / Storm Shadow (Andrew Koji)
- Station Eleven, Frank Chaudhary (Nabhaan Rizwan)
- Suicide Squad, Barry Allen / The Flash (Ezra Miller)
- Supergirl, Winslow Schott Jr. / Toyman (Jeremy Jordan)
- Terminator Genisys, Eric Thompson (Douglas Smith)
- Wanted (2019 BS Japan edition), Barry (Chris Pratt)
- Wayward Pines, Jason Higgins (Tom Stevens)
- We Don't Belong Here, Tomas (Justin Chatwin)
- Where the Crawdads Sing, Chase Andrews (Harris Dickinson)

==== Animation ====
- Frozen II, Ryder

=== Radio ===
- Kobayashi talk (2020-)-Anium Radio Station

=== Video games ===
- Cyberpunk 2077 (2020), Male V
- Final Fantasy VII Remake (2020), Butch
- Samurai Warriors 5 (2021), Tadakatsu Honda
- Scarlet Nexus (2021), Kaito Sumeragi
- Granblue Fantasy (2022), Falsch
- Wizardry Variants Daphne (2023), Dylanhart
- Zenless Zone Zero (2024), Von Lycaon
- The Hundred Line: Last Defense Academy (2025), Takemaru Yakushiji
- Petit Planet (2026), Mobai

=== Stage ===
- Two strange people
- Grab the air
- Hansel and Gretel
- Biloxi Blues (2013)
