= The Mortuary Collection =

2019 film by Ryan Spindell

- Release poster
- Directed by: Ryan Spindell
- Written by: Ryan Spindell
- Produced by: Allison Friedman; T. Justin Ross
- Starring: Clancy Brown; Caitlin Custer; Christine Kilmer; Jacob Elordi; Ema Horvath; Barak Hardley; Sarah Hay; V Nixie
- Cinematography: Elie Smolkin; Caleb Heymann
- Edited by: Erik Ekman; Joseph Shahood
- Music by: Mondo Boys
- Production companies: Trapdoor Pictures; Glass Eye Pix
- Distributed by: Shudder
- Release dates: September 22, 2019 (Fantastic Fest); October 15, 2020 (Shudder)
- Running time: 108 minutes
- Country: United States
- Language: English

The Mortuary Collection is a 2019 American horror anthology film written and directed by Ryan Spindell. It stars Clancy Brown, Caitlin Custer, Christine Kilmer, Jacob Elordi, Barak Hardley, Sarah Hay, Mike C. Nelson, and V Nixie.

The film had its world premiere at Fantastic Fest on September 22, 2019. It was released on Shudder on October 15, 2020.

== Plot ==
=== Frame story, part 1 ===
In the small island town of Raven's End in the 1980s, mortician Montgomery Dark manages the Raven's End Mortuary. One day, a young woman named Sam shows curiosity about a small child-sized coffin which Montgomery has recently performed a funeral for. She then reveals that she has actually come to respond to the Help Wanted sign outside. He agrees to give her an interview and takes her on a tour of the facility. Montgomery agrees to tell Sam a series of stories about those that have died in Raven's End.

=== Segment 1 ===
In the 1950s, a young woman named Emma goes to the restroom during a party to check on the wallets she's pickpocketed while attending. However, the bathroom medicine cabinet piques her curiosity, and she tries to open it but is unable to. When she pries it open, she finds a tentacled monster inside, and is killed by it. The monster drags Emma's lifeless body into the cabinet and shuts it, then extends a tentacle out to switch off the lights.

=== Segment 2: Unprotected ===
In the 1960s, frat boy Jake passes out condoms on campus, preaching the value of sexual liberation as an excuse to get girls to come to frat parties and sleep with the members of his fraternity. However, upon making a connection with a woman named Sandra at a party, he secretly removes his condom while having sex with her. The next morning, he finds himself with a rash and goes to the campus doctor, Dr. Harold Kubler, for help. Jake discovers to his horror that he has a creature growing inside his stomach. He attempts to meet with Sandra but is caught in a surprise celebration by his fraternity buddies for sleeping with 67 women. They let him go when his water breaks and covers the group with discolored ooze.

At Sandra's house, Jake is laid down on a table by Sandra's parents to help him birth his baby. Sandra is angered when Jake admits that he took his condom off, resulting in his anomalous pregnancy, showing no sympathy when he whimpers about how he used to be bullied for being fat. She makes a phone call to another man, saying she is now free to go on a date with him, and callously leaves Jake with her parents. When Jake asks how they will get the baby out, Sandra's mother tells him that the only way the baby can come out is the same way it got in. As the baby is forcing its way out, Jake's penis explodes, ripping open his abdomen, killing him. Sandra's mother takes the monstrous baby upstairs and lays it in a crib in a room full of other monstrous children.

=== Segment 3: Till Death ===
In the 1970s, Wendell Owens is depressed and devoted to taking care of his catatonic wife Carol. Forced to plan his life around her, he responds positively to his doctor, Dr. Kubler's, suggestion that he "accidentally" overdose Carol on painkillers. However, when he tries to give them to her, she grabs his arm, then chokes on the food the pills are hidden in, forcing him to help her throw them up. When she collapses afterward, she impales her head on a figurine and dies.

Wendell calls Dr. Kubler for help, but is only told to get rid of the body. He dismembers the corpse amid hallucinations of it being alive again, then packs it into a “bridal chest” and takes it to his apartment building elevator. On his way down, the elevator gets stuck and Wendell's neighbor calls the police as he hallucinates blood leaking from the chest. The elevator seems to start again and go infinitely down as Carol's body rises from the trunk in the form of a horrific ghoul and forces Wendell into a kiss. When the police arrive, they find Wendell on the floor of the elevator, driven mad and repeating his wedding vows over and over with the corpse still in the box.

=== Frame story, part 2 ===
Sam complains that Montgomery's stories, however true they may be, are too predictable and follow a theme of people being punished for their sins. Montgomery leads Sam down to the mortuary subbasement and prepares to cremate the child-size coffin; Sam stops him and tells him she's not here for a job - she's here for the dead child. She tells him her own story.

=== Segment 4: The Babysitter Murders ===
One evening, Sam babysits for a child named Logan Kubler. She watches a horror movie as she cooks dinner but misses a news bulletin about an escaped patient from the local asylum. She then finds a strange man with a head wound in the house; not sure how he got in, Sam is uncertain about how to react until the phone rings and she hears an answering machine message about the escaped killer. This prompts her and the strange man to fight, the man charging upstairs to try to find Logan. After a series of encounters, the man tries to strangle Sam but she stops him by telling him he isn't a killer. Sobbing, he agrees and releases her, only for her to then throw him down the stairs and drop a TV on his head, crushing it.

When Logan's parents - Dr. Kubler and his wife Debra - come home, they find the dead man and recognize him as the real Sam as the broken television reveals that the woman claiming to be Sam is in fact the escaped patient, Charlotte Gibbons, a child murderer called the Boggy Bay Tooth Fairy who cannibalizes children and takes their deciduous teeth as trinkets. They soon find Logan's remains charred in the oven and scream in horror.

=== Frame story, part 3 ===
As Charlotte finishes her story, she uses her buck knife to remove a tooth from Logan's remains, not having had the chance to do so when she killed him. She then stabs Montgomery in the stomach, reaffirming her belief that bad people win in the real world. However, Montgomery - who appears to bleed embalming fluid - simply laughs, telling her that the job is now hers. Charlotte attempts to escape the mortuary, but finds herself unable to do so via a supernatural force that sends her back into the mortuary entrance. Montgomery corners her in the library and explains that he was never able to leave either, and how being trapped and cursed to be the house's mortician made him realize how stories remind people that one's actions have repercussions.

Charlotte angrily declares that she decides how her story ends, but Montgomery replies that it is "just beginning" as certain books fall from the shelves. The charred spirits of her child victims crawl out of the fallen library books and tear Charlotte apart, also reclaiming the teeth she took from them. Montgomery sews Charlotte's body back together and replaces her blood with embalming fluid. Finally he finds himself able to leave the mortuary for the first time after several decades. However, after a moment in sunlight, he ages rapidly and explodes into dust. Charlotte's body reanimates inside the mortuary and a final scene shows that she has now become the new mortician, as she tells a boy named Bill, who was earlier seen delivering newspapers, that she is about to start “making dinner.”

== Cast ==
- Clancy Brown as Montgomery Dark
- Caitlin Custer as Sam/Charlotte Gibbons
- Christine Kilmer as Emma
- Jacob Elordi as Jake Matthews
- Ema Horvath as Sandra
- Barak Hardley as Wendell Owens
- Sarah Hay as Carol Peters
- Ben Hethcoat as The Killer a.k.a. "Sam"
- Mike C. Nelson as Dr. Harold Kubler
- Jennifer Irwin as Margaret
- James Bachman as Ralph
- Alison Gallaher as Mrs. Debra Kubler
- Phyllis Applegate as Mrs. Avery
- Brennan Murray as Connor
- Michael Bow as Todd
- Josephine McAdam as Faye
- Tristan Byon as Bill
- Bradley Bundlie as Logan Kubler
- V Nixie as Carol's body double

== Production ==
Spindell's 22-minute short film The Babysitter Murders (2015) was featured in The Mortuary Collection, as one of the segments.

== Release ==
The film had its world premiere at Fantastic Fest on September 22, 2019. It was released on Shudder on October 15, 2020.

== Reception ==
On the review aggregator website Rotten Tomatoes, the film holds an approval rating of 97% based on 65 reviews, with an average rating of 7.7/10. The website's critics consensus reads, "The rare anthology that maintains a consistently high level of quality, The Mortuary Collection is a must-see undertaking for horror fans." Metacritic, which uses a weighted average, assigned the film a score of 69 out of 100, based on 7 critics, indicating "generally favorable" reviews.
