= Witching Hour (manga) =

Japanese manga series

- First tankōbon volume cover

ウシミツガオ (Ushimitsu Gao)
- Genre: Supernatural
- Manga
- Written by: Paru Itagaki
- Published by: Akita Shoten
- English publisher: NA: Viz Media
- Imprint: Shōnen Champion Comics
- Magazine: Champion Cross
- Original run: October 16, 2024 – May 13, 2026
- Volumes: 3

Witching Hour (Japanese: ウシミツガオ, Hepburn: Ushimitsu Gao) is a Japanese manga series written and illustrated by Paru Itagaki.

== Publication ==
Written and illustrated by Paru Itagaki, Witching Hour was serialized on Akita Shoten's Champion Cross website from October 16, 2024, to May 13, 2026. The first volume was released on March 8, 2025.

On February 20, 2026, Viz Media announced they would release the series in English. The first volume will be released in Q4 2026.

| No. | Original release date | Original ISBN | English release date | English ISBN |
|---|---|---|---|---|
| 1 | May 8, 2025 | 978-4-253-29881-0 | October 20, 2026 | 978-1-9747-6642-0 |
| 2 | December 8, 2025 | 978-4-253-00905-8 | January 19, 2027 | 978-1-9747-6868-4 |
| 3 | August 6, 2026 | 978-4-253-01878-4 | | |
