= The Gallows Act II =

2019 American supernatural horror film

- Theatrical release poster
- Directed by: Chris Lofing; Travis Cluff
- Written by: Chris Lofing; Travis Cluff
- Produced by: Jason Blum; Guymon Casady; Dean Schnider; Benjamin Forkner; Chris Lofing; Travis Cluff
- Starring: Ema Horvath; Chris Milligan; Brittany Falardeau
- Cinematography: Kyle Gentz
- Edited by: Chris Lofing
- Music by: Zach Lemmon
- Production companies: Blumhouse Productions; Entertainment 360; Tremendum Pictures
- Distributed by: Lionsgate
- Release date: October 25, 2019 (United States)
- Running time: 100 minutes
- Country: United States
- Language: English

The Gallows Act II is a 2019 American supernatural horror film written and directed by Chris Lofing and Travis Cluff. It stars Ema Horvath, Chris Milligan and Brittany Falardeau. It is the sequel to the 2015 found footage film The Gallows. However, unlike its predecessor, this film does not utilize the found footage filming technique.

It was released on October 25, 2019 in theaters, on demand and digital by Lionsgate. As with the first film, critical reception for The Gallows Act II has been predominantly negative.

== Plot ==
Teenage friends Victor, Lex, Scott, Nick, and Marcus record a video of them doing a variation of ‘The Charlie Charlie Challenge’ by having Victor read a passage from ‘The Gallows,’ the reportedly cursed play that killed high school actor Charlie Grimille. Paranormal activity seemingly plagues the basement. Later, Victor finds Marcus hanged outside with swing set chains. The supposedly supernatural serial killer The Hangman strangles Victor with another chain.

Aspiring actress Auna Rue moves in with her prop and dressmaker sister, Lisa, to attend Fellbrook High School, which has a prestigious drama program. Auna embarrasses herself in front of Mr. Schlake's class by poorly performing a monologue until a schoolmate, Cade Parker, helps her. A user named ‘almostfamous99’ interacts with Auna via chat on her unpopular YouTube channel. Almostfamous99 links Auna to Victor’s viral video of having conjured paranormal activity by reading from The Gallows. Auna obtains a copy of The Gallows from the school library. Auna becomes unusually obsessed with the play and later uploads a video of her reading it.

Auna becomes the star of Mr. Schlake’s class when she performs a monologue from The Gallows. After viewers notice a table moving during her reading, Auna's video also balloons in popularity. Auna records a second reading during which an object flies across her bedroom. Cade introduces Auna to his parents, who are famous actors Craig and Kate Parker. While Cade stops at a gas station, Auna becomes spooked by the brief reflection of a hanging man in the rearview mirror. Another message from almostfamous99 directs Auna to a Charlie Challenge fan page. There, Auna learns about Charlie Grimille while browsing videos of hanging deaths and paranormal activity. Auna briefly sees The Hangman stalking her in Lisa’s home. At a party, Auna has a vision of The Hangman killing Cade. Rattled, Auna demands to go home. As haunting visions unravel her mind, Auna tells Mr. Schlake she doesn’t want to read from The Gallows anymore, but she still recites a monologue from the play. Auna blocks almostfamous99 when his messages turn to taunt. Auna also starts watching distressing confessional videos posted by Victor’s friend Lex, who reveals a disfiguring mark on her neck.

Lisa follows a rope to a tree outside, where she finds her dog hanging dead, which leads to a confrontation with Auna. Auna unsuccessfully tries to intervene via text when she watches Lex, distraught with suicidal tendencies, prepare to hang herself during a livestream. The Hangman seemingly kills Lex. Lisa packs to leave for a show she is working on, but The Hangman shows up and strangles Lisa.

Meanwhile, Cade researches the deaths that took place at Beatrice High School, where he reads an article that suggests invoking Charlie Grimille’s name summons the hangman character he was supposed to play in The Gallows, which leads to the arrest of Pfeifer Ross, the crazed daughter of Charlie Grimille, and her mother. Cade discovers that the two women were committed to a nearby mental hospital. Cade takes Auna to see Pfeifer, hoping to find a way to stop The Hangman’s curse. Pfeifer claims the only way to appease The Hangman is to offer a willing sacrifice to be killed. Cade and Auna are abducted outside the asylum and find themselves on a gallows with nooses around their necks in a forest. The Hangman appears. A hooded executioner tells the duo they must decide who will be sacrificed.

Before Auna can stop him, Cade volunteers; a trap door opens beneath his feet, and Cade begins hanging. Auna offers her life to save Cade’s, and another trap door opens just as Auna is hanged. After Auna dies, Victor, Lex, Cade’s parents are among the many participants in a conspiracy. Cade removes his harness, revealing himself to be almostfamous99, and proclaims their perfect Charlie Challenge.

== Cast ==
- Ema Horvath as Auna Rue
- Chris Milligan as Cade Parker
- Brittany Falardeau as Lisa Rue
- Anthony Jensen as Scott Lamont
- Dennis Hurley as Mr. Schlake
- Jono Cota as Victor
- Erika Miranda as Lex
- Jener Dasilva as Nick
- Charles Chudabala as Stage Hand
- Stefmerie Halstead as Empress
- Pfeifer Brown as Pfeifer Ross
- Travis Cluff as Charlie Grimille (uncredited)

== Production ==
Principal photography on the film began in October 2016, with filming locations including San Joaquin College of Law in Clovis, California.

After filming and post-production was completed, a special early screening took place at the Warner Bros. lot in Burbank, California in August 2017, for fans aged 13–25.

== Release ==
The film was released on October 25, 2019 in theaters, on demand and digital by Lionsgate, unlike the first film, Warner Bros. and New Line Cinema have no involvement with the sequel.

=== Critical response ===
On Rotten Tomatoes, the film has an approval rating of 0% based on reviews from 12 critics. Glenn Kenny of The New York Times called it "a thoroughly undistinguished follow-up", and criticized the film's lack of logic. Justin Lowe from The Hollywood Reporter offered the film similar criticism, writing, "Lofing and Cluff’s script blends horror and thriller elements without ever settling on a clear genre choice. The film’s surprising final twist only serves to emphasize its narrative incoherence, precipitated by insufficient backstory and inadequate character development." Brian Tallerico of Roger Ebert.com gave the film a thumbs down, calling it Blumhouse's worst film, and criticised the film's script, shallow characters, story, and overuse of jump-scares.
