= Like. Share. Follow. =

- Theatrical release poster
- Directed by: Glenn Gers
- Written by: Glenn Gers
- Produced by: Adam Hendricks; John H. Lang; Greg Gilreath
- Starring: Keiynan Lonsdale; Ema Horvath
- Cinematography: Lyn Moncrief
- Edited by: Frank Openchowski
- Music by: Joel Corelitz
- Production companies: Blumhouse Productions; Divide/Conquer; Gunpowder & Sky; Seer Capital
- Distributed by: Cinemax
- Release dates: October 18, 2017 (Screamfest); October 31, 2017 (United States)
- Running time: 97 minutes
- Country: United States
- Language: English

Like. Share. Follow. is a 2017 American psychological horror film written and directed by Glenn Gers. It stars Keiynan Lonsdale and Ema Horvath. The film is a co-production between Blumhouse Productions, Divide/Conquer and Gunpowder & Sky.

The film had its world premiere at the Screamfest Horror Film Festival on October 18, 2017. It was released on October 31, 2017 by Cinemax.

== Plot ==
Garrett, a rising YouTube star, begins a relationship with Shell, an obsessive fan, who has a deadly, dangerous crush on him and is determined to win his heart by any means necessary.

== Cast ==
- Keiynan Lonsdale as Garret
- Ema Horvath as Shell
- Nate Hartley as Lyle
- Amy Pham as Kiki
- Abraham Benrubi as Detective Yarden
- Michael Boatman as Norman
- Remy Nozik as Petunia
- Monica Lopez as Marie
- Andrew Spieler as Bruteburger
- Gabriel Conte as Carbonite

== Production ==
Principal photography on the film began on September 15, 2015.

== Release ==
It had its world premiere at the Screamfest Horror Film Festival on October 18, 2017. The film was released on October 31, 2017.
