= Beast Complex =

Japanese manga series by Paru Itagaki

- First volume cover
- Genre: Drama, fantasy
- Manga
- Written by: Paru Itagaki
- Published by: Akita Shoten
- English publisher: NA: Viz Media
- Imprint: Shōnen Champion Comics
- Magazine: Weekly Shōnen Champion
- Original run: March 3, 2016 – present
- Volumes: 4

Beast Complex (stylized in all caps) is a Japanese manga series written and illustrated by Paru Itagaki. It is a compilation of short stories set in the same world as the series Beastars; its original run served as a predecessor for Beastars, and some of Beast Complex's stories expand on characters from Beastars. The stories take place in a modern world occupied by anthropomorphized animals of various species. The animals are divided into carnivores and herbivores, and eating meat is illegal since it can only be sourced from anthropomorphic animals. Carnivores and herbivores often come into conflict due to the former's craving for meat.

It was first serialized in Weekly Shōnen Champion from March 2016 to March 2019. In 2021, the series resumed serialization.

== Development ==
While studying filmography at Musashino Art University in 2013, Itagaki made a doujinshi titled Beast Complex that she sold at the university. She self-published it under the pen name "Itagaki Hadome". It was a romance story about a wolf named Legoshi, who worked as a stylist assistant, and a rabbit named Haru. It had three volumes with three chapters each. She also made a short film adaptation of the series. The praise from her friends for the manga inspired her to become a mangaka. The doujinshi introduced characters and setting elements (such as a war resulting in the illegalization of meat and the creation of a black market to sell it) that would be reused in the 2016 series and Beastars. Otherwise, it is unrelated to the ongoing Beast Complex.

In 2015, Itagaki began to work on the new Beast Complex. She published the first stories of Beast Complex in Weekly Shonen Champion throughout 2016. It was originally intended to be a four volume limited series.

Itagaki made Beastars in response to her editor asking for a longer and more sustainable story. During Beastars' run, three more Beast Complex stories were published. After Beastars concluded, it was announced that Beast Complex would restart to expand on the world of Beastars.

== Publication ==
Stories 1-6 were published in Beast Complex volume 1. Stories 7-12 (and in the English version, story 14) were published in volume 2. Stories 13-19 were published in volume 3. Stories 20-25 were published in volume 4.

=== Volumes ===
No.	Original release date	Original ISBN	English release date	English ISBN
1	February 8, 2018	978-4-253-22629-5	April 8, 2021	978-1-9747-2121-4
2	April 8, 2021	978-4-253-22663-9	March 21, 2023	978-1-9747-2791-9
3	May 7, 2021	978-4-253-22664-6	June 20, 2023	978-1-9747-2792-6
4	December 6, 2024	978-4-253-28117-1	December 23, 2025	978-1-9747-5791-6

=== Stories ===
No.	Title	Original release date	English release date	Volume No.
1	The Lion and the Bat (ライオンとコウモリ, Raion to Kōmori)	March 3, 2016	March 16, 2021	1
Raul, a studious lion and student class president, is tasked by one of his teachers with convincing dropout Azmo the bat to return from school in exchange for a recommendation letter for a prestigious college. When he finds Azmo, the bat reveals that he dropped out last year after his parents were eaten by lions. Azmo then accuses Raul of being a typical lion—prideful, self-serving, and savage—prompting Raul to bear his fangs and grab him. The next day, Raul apologies and the two befriend each other as Raul helps Azmo catch up with his studies. Their bond does not convince Azmo to return to school, but instead gives him the strength to move on from his parents' deaths and leave town.
2	The Tiger and the Beaver (トラとビーバー, Tora to Bībā)	March 10, 2016	March 16, 2021	1
An all-species boarding school puts carnivore and herbivore students into separate classes and dorms after they turn 10 years old. This results in beaver Mogu and Siberian tiger Gon only being allowed to officially meet at recess. While sneaking out together one evening, they see carnivore students threatening to nibble an herbivore if he does not pay them. Although they do not know any of the upperclassmen, they decide to help by taking pictures to show to the principal. Gon uses the camera's flash, which alerts the bullies and prompts them to pursue the two friends. Gon and Mogu get a tandem bicycle and head towards the principal's office. On their way, the bullies capture Gon and offer him a spot on their gang next year. Gon rejects the offer, choosing to use his future strength to protect his friend. He returns to the bike, and the duo reach the orangutan principal's office. Although they're unsure if they will drift apart like carnivores and herbivores often do, they two decide not to worry about the strength of their friendship.
3	The Camel and the Wolf (ラクダとオオカミ, Rakuda to Ōkami)	March 17, 2016	March 16, 2021	1
Camel Garon recounts his one-night stand with a wolf to his friends. He was a retiring newspaper reporter who frequently wrote about carnivores and what could possibly prompt them to devour herbivores. He was struggling to write his last article before quitting journalism when a beautiful wolf asked to sit by him. He nearly drove her away by asking if she has ever had the urge to devour an herbivore, but he quickly apologized. The wolf introduced herself as Abby and the two ate pancakes at a restaurant. The two then go to Abby's apartment, where Abby revealed that this was the first time she has had the urge to eat an herbivore. Garon then allowed her to eat his left ring finger. The experience changed his mind about resigning from journalism, and he now fuels his writing with the feelings from that night.
4	The Kangaroo and the Black Panther (カンガルーとクロヒョウ, Kangarū to Kuro Hyō)	March 24, 2016	March 16, 2021	1
A kangaroo is managing a once prestigious hotel. The surrounding neighborhood has been plagued with murders, devourings, prostitution, and drugs, and now contains the headquarters of the notorious Braccas gang. A teenage black panther girl named Meg checks in, asking for a room not visible from the outside. Her tattered clothing, thin build, and large suitcase prompt the kangaroo to wonder what kind of trouble she's in. The two share their love of the lawlessness of the neighborhood, and the kangaroo warns her that there is an increased police presence due to the Braccas gang. While playing cards together in the lobby, they overhear on the radio that the Braccas headquarters have been raided, but the body of a missing herbivore has been given to an unnamed carnivore. Meg flees to her room, and the kangaroo pursues her and holds her at gunpoint. Meg looks out the window, enamored by the fireworks from a nearby festival. The kangaroo does not have the heart to kill her, so he tells her to leave and not to make any more mistakes.
5	The Crocodile and the Gazelle (ワニとガゼル, Wani to Gazeru)	August 24, 2017	March 16, 2021	1
Luna the gazelle is the sous-chef on the live cooking show 'Happy Happy Cooking'. The show's ratings have been declining over the years, so the studio decides to replace the retiring host with a saltwater crocodile named Benny. Luna finds the addition of a carnivore chef very alarming, especially when he says his specialty is dishes that satisfy the craving for meat. The next day, they record their first episode together. While preparing nut burgers, Benny asks the audience to think of the texture and flavor of meat, pointing to his herbivore cohost. The two cohosts argue about Luna's prejudice against carnivores and Benny's inappropriate comments while still continuing to cook, captivating the audience. Luna tastes the finished nutburger steaks, and is pleasantly surprised by their taste. Although the conversation nearly violated the broadcasting code, the show continues airing; its ratings become high again and it even wins a media award.
6	The Fox and the Chameleon (キツネとカメレオン, Kitsune to Kamereon)	October 12, 2017	March 16, 2021	1
A red fox and a chameleon are tasked with distributing handouts organized by species each week after school. The fox asks why the chameleon remains visible during class but not when he's alone with her. He states that he is practicing his mimicry and is also embarrassed by the idea of being caught looking at her. The next day, the fox is being bullied by other foxes. When the leader of the fox group asks her to buy them sodas, she tells them to ask the nearby group of lionesses instead. This prompts the leader to push the fox to the ground. Since foxes are stereotyped as rude and hot-tempered, the fox protagonist believes fighting back could backfire. Seeing that her chameleon friend stayed invisible and idle instead of risking getting involved, she wonders if acting like the stereotypical fox will bring her happiness and safety the way acting like a stereotypical chameleon did for him. Instead, she throws the organized handouts out the window to protest the stereotyping of animals. The next day, the fox bullies want revenge after the fox's lion comment caused a misunderstanding that prompted the lionesses to beat up the foxes. The chameleon saves the fox by perfecting his camouflage and attacking the foxes, who run away believing that a poltergeist attacked them.
7	The Chipmunk and the "Snow Rabbit" (シマリスと(ユキウサギ), Shimarisu to (Yuki Usagi))	March 12, 2019	March 21, 2023	2
Ms. Fig, a snow rabbit, is a beloved author of various novels about modern-day herbivores; her weekly column is the most popular contribution to the magazine Lotus. The magazine editors need her manuscript by tonight's deadline to publish, but she has not mailed it yet. They send chipmunk Ms. Jin to retrieve Ms. Fig's manuscript. When she goes to "Ms.Fig's" apartment, she is greeted by a male moon bear. The disheveled and exhausted bear invites the chipmunk in, saying he has half a page left. Ms. Jin, realizing the truth, compliments the bear on his ability to accurately depict the fear and sorrow herbivores experience. The bear, desperate for inspiration, suddenly approaches the chipmunk; the look in her eyes helps him write the last words for the column. He thanks her for helping him get over his writer's block and gives her the complete manuscript. Ms. Jin heads back to the office with the manuscript, reflecting on the experience.
8	The Pig and the Peacock (ブタとクジャク, Buta to Kujaku)	January 7, 2021	March 21, 2023	2
Eugene the pig works as a taxidermist, preserving the bodies of the deceased. A police officer peacock named Gerbera visits the shop, claiming its existence is in a legal gray area, as it is in bad taste. Eugene defends his work, stating that families request it and believing that he brings out and preserves the unique beauty of each animal. The two befriend each other, and Gerbera apologies for his comments by fulfilling Eugene's request to sit in a case like the preserved animals displayed in the shop. Gerbera reveals that he is being assigned to a dangerous area where he could risk being eaten, and asks Eugene to preserve him so he does not have to die performing a job he does not love. Eugene initially agrees to preserve him the next day, but instead gifts Gerbera five hundred gerbera flowers, finding him more beautiful alive than dead.
9	The Shiba Inu and the Shiba Inu (シバイヌとシバイヌ, Shiba Inu to Shiba Inu)	January 14, 2021	March 21, 2023	2
Mugi the Shiba Inu works as a model for calendars. He is portrayed as a cute and youthful girl on the calendars, but in reality the 40-year-old dog is a couch potato and bitter about how people view him. He notes that species with adorable appearances are often pushed into being cute, even though Shibas are strong-willed and hot-tempered. His employer keeps pressuring him to get facial reconstruction and lose weight, and advises Mugi to accept the image the world has given him and continue to endure it. Mugi attempts to keep up appearances, but when two tigers recognize him as a model and note that people have called him washed-up and a fraud, Mugi snaps. He becomes aggressive, punches one of the tigers, and states that he never asked the world to love him. Tabloids report on the real Mugi, displaying a ferocious picture of him growling. Instead of firing him, his boss suggests that he takes the opportunity to reinvent his image. Mugi initially declines, but reconsiders the idea after a Shiba Inu grocery clerk aspires to be more like him.
10	The Crow and the Kangaroo (カラスとカンガルー, Karasu to Kangarū)	January 21, 2021	March 21, 2023	2
White furred animals, referred to as "brights", are frequently targeted for their body parts, so they live in the neighborhood District 0 for their safety. At a community meeting about a polar bear murdered in another district, albino crow Ebisu asks his friend about a kangaroo named Orion. His friend explains that she is nicknamed after the black spots in the shape of the Orion constellation on her crotch, and that she is frequently sleeping with guys to be allowed to stay in the district since the spots keep her from being a true bright. The next day, Ebisu covers himself with mud hoping to leave the district. Orion questions him, and reveals that she hates District 0 because of her treatment and because its white structures prevent her from seeing the stars, but she is afraid of the outside world. Although he initially thought of her as shallow, Ebisu wants to learn about her and her true name. The next day, the two walk together, inadvertently leaving the district. Ebisu is quickly captured by two carnivores and tells Orion to run and abandon him. Instead, Orion kicks the carnivores and frees Ebisu, and the two decide to never return to District 0.
11	The Eagle and the Gerbil (オオワシとスナネズミ, Ōwashi to Sunanezumi)	January 28, 2021	March 21, 2023	2
Steller's sea eagle Leica acts as a personal taxi for gerbil Fina. They live together so she can have convenient and safe travel while he has shelter and food. Fina reveals that she is getting married and no longer wants Leica's services. He begs her not to leave him, even promising to start carrying her during storms despite his fear of lightning. Fina does not budge, simply asking Leica to get a job just like everyone else. Leica attempts to fly Fina through a storm, and is reminded of how scared he was to hatch out of his egg. Leica realizes how fearful he has been throughout his life and, feeling like a chick again, decides to try to make it on his own.
12	The Japanese Deer and the Snow Leopard (エゾシカとユキヒョウ, Ezo Shika to Yuki Hyō)	February 18, 2021	June 20, 2023	3
Luke the snow leopard and Rosé the spotted deer are the leads for the critically acclaimed movie Dinner, a romance film about a carnivore and herbivore couple that ends with the carnivore devouring his love interest. They have just won the Academia Award for best leading actor and actress respectively. As they wait together for their next interview, Luke reveals that his acting was so realistic because he had eaten the makeup artist duck during filming. Luke wanted Rosé to know first since he planned to confess it at the interview. Rosé attempts to talk him out of it, as it will cause trouble for everyone involved in the film. Luke accuses Rosé of being concerned about her own acting career, as Dinner was her first major gig. Rosé attempts to physically prevent him from leaving the room, but stops and accepts that her acting was never all that good in the first place. The two, realizing how low they have sunk, go to the interview, where Luke confesses and Rosé pretends to not have known.
13	The Tiger and the Alpaca (トラとアルパカ, Tora to Arupaka)	March 4, 2021	June 20, 2023	3
Aisha the tiger is frustrated at her job, where she is one of the few carnivores and needs to put on a fake smile as she deals with her "idiot" coworkers. Once a week, she destresses with a massage. Marylin the alpaca chiropractor asks Aisha to roll over to her back; Aisha refuses as showing one's belly is a carnivore sign of surrender. Marylin insists and reveals that she takes enjoyment having power over a large carnivore. She continues massaging Aisha's back, saying that she can tell by Aisha's back stripes that she bows too often. The revelation upsets Aisha, who insists that her life is fine. Since Aisha turned around, Marylin is able to push her back onto the table belly-up. Marylin notes that the tiger stripes don't extend to her belly, reflecting her vulnerability. Aisha can't recall what happened next (only that the experience felt unreal and good), and decides to stop going to the massage clinic. Two months later, Aisha and Marylin cross paths in a park, where Marylin comments Aisha on her relaxed posture while also calling her a kitty.
14	The Wolf and the Rabbit (オオカミとウサギ, Ōkami to Usagi)	February 4, 2021	March 21, 2023	3 (Japanese) 2 (English)
Legoshi the wolf and Haru the rabbit have been dating for a year. Haru is disappointed by how little intimacy Legoshi gives her in their relationship. Haru asks Legoshi to participate in a ritual after her Coming of Age Day ceremony. This purification ritual is where a scarred herbivore and the carnivore who harmed them come together to drive malicious spirits out of the scar. Legoshi agrees to participate, as he had scratched Haru's arm when he first encountered her. Standing in line, Legoshi realizes that the ritual is about carnivores deciding to make amends for their actions. After soaking the scar with water and cleaning it, Legoshi surprises Haru by kissing her arm, and the two happily spend the rest of the day together.
15	The Python and the Hyena (ニシキヘビとハイエナ, Nishikihebi to Haiena)	February 10, 2021	June 20, 2023	3
Kameji the python always comes to school early so the other students do not step on him. When he enters the classroom, he sees that a hyena has hung himself. Kameji cuts the rope with his teeth and realizes that the hyena is Murou, who had previously bullied him. Kameji, worried that others will think he strangled Murou and faked his hanging because he is a snake, swallows Murou, leading others to assume that he just had a big breakfast. Kameji tries to find out why Murou would kill himself, but can not find anything in his locker and bag other than schoolbooks. Kameji wonders how Murou was struggling, putting on the facade of a typical hyena but having no hobbies or friends. Murou begins to move, making Kameji realize he is not dead. Kameji spits him out, then hugs him.
16	The Wolf and the Seal (オオカミとアザラシ, Ōkami to Azarashi)	March 11, 2021	June 20, 2023	3
Legoshi the wolf and Sagwan the spotted seal look for the daughter of an octopus who has been kidnapped by a land animal. They are too late and find her grilled tentacles being sold. Sagwan purchases and eats all of the tentacles. Legoshi is guilty about the octopus's death and is confused by Sagwan's nonchalance. Sagwan explains to the octopus mother what happened, and he and Legoshi go to the daughter's funeral. In the water, Legoshi thinks about how soothing the sea is and reflects on the marine animals' view on life. Legoshi apologizes for his arrogance and for thinking badly about Sagwan's actions.
17	The Turtle and the Sheep (カメとヒツジ, Kame to Hitsuji)	February 25, 2021	June 20, 2023	3
Kiyosumi the sheep is tasked by a teacher to report cigarette usage; when she provokes some lions by warning them of the trouble they could get in for smoking on school grounds, Abu the turtle frightens them off. Other students fear him because he has the word "hell" tattooed on the back of his shell, and he usually stays retreated in his shell to hide his long limbs covered in self-applied tattoos. Abu asks if he could practice tattooing on Kiyosumi's horns. Kiyosumi lets him do so, telling him that she's considered getting her horns removed since their length could one day kill her. Kiyosumi often does not take action unless someone else commands her to do so, and wonders why no one has told her to remove her horns. Abu tells her that other animals are usually preoccupied with themselves rather than the issues of others. For example, to his surprise, no one has confronted him about his tattoos. After tattooing Kiyosumi's horns with flowers, the two spend the night together traveling around town. Later, Kiyosumi decides to have her horns removed to keep their special night a secret and to guarantee her safety.
18	The Lion and the Rabbit (ライオンとウサギ, Raion to Usagi)	March 18, 2021	June 20, 2023	3
While making out in public, lion Eado mauls his rabbit girlfriend, Ako. One year later, he finds out that she is returning to their university campus from a magazine cover. He wonders how he should apologize to her. Suddenly, Ako runs up to him and hugs him. Eado is confused, as Ako is usually quick to blame and the mauling left her with deep scars across her face. He invites her to his apartment for a drink and to talk about their past shallow relationship, where she flaunted their status as an interspecies couple for fame. Ako angrily runs out, but Eado catches up to her and asks that they become a real couple instead of a trendy one. Ako happily agrees.
19	The Alligator and the Cow (ワニとウシ, Wani to Ushi)	March 25, 2021	June 20, 2023	3
Heise the cow returns home from school with his alligator classmate Nagumo. Since it is raining, Heise suggests that Nagumo has a warm bath and stays over until the rain stops. Nagumo voraciously drinks the bathwater that Heise was previously soaking in, as the taste reminds him of beef stock his brother brought him from the black market. While walking back to Nagumo's home, Heise tells Nagumo that he saw him drinking the bathwater and suspects that he did so because he's from a lower-class family and can't afford meat. The next day, Nagumo is tasked with cleaning the school pool alone after losing a game of rock-paper-scissors; Heise decides to assist him out of pity, and jokes that Nagumo's bad luck must be punishment for his bathwater drinking. Nagumo knocks Heise into the pool, accusing Heise of being pompous and deriving pleasure from Nagumo's embarrassment. Heise apologizes and states that he really wants to befriend Nagumo, and the two decide to move forward from the event.
20	The Black Panther and the Sea Otter (クロヒョウとラッコ, Kurohyou to rakko)	August 12, 2021	December 23, 2025	4
Gil the black panther and Po the sea otter commute on the train from work everyday. Gil unwillingly keeps craving Po's hand, and when the train breaks, Gil accidentally licks it. Gil fiercely apologies, but Po doesn't mind if he is eaten, as marine animals have different views on predation and death than land animals. The next day at work, their boss chides Gil for making a mistake while complementing Po, and wonders why both of them could be so different when both have traveled far from home to work. While waiting for the train, Gil is stressed and overwhelmed; Po suggests he licks his hand, but Gil declines. The two get on the extremely crowded train, where Gil thanks Po for not discussing the licking with others, and thinks his loneliness contributed to the licking. Po reveals that he also feels lonely, as although his work is valued, his coworkers avoid him due to his eating of fish. The two hold hands, as doing so makes otters feel safe, and continue doing so even when they leave the crowded train.
21	The Zebra and the White Tiger (シマウマとホワイトタイガー, Shimauma to howaitotaigā)	December 1, 2022	December 23, 2025	4
Mika the zebra is awaiting her next anonymous zebra date she met through a dating app. She is surprised that Atari is actually a white tiger, as he only showed his arms in photos. Mika realizes that her previous dates were not compatible with her because she also used a picture that did not reflect her true personality. Although she is worried that Atari may be trying to eat her, they go on with the date and enjoy themselves. After two cats call Atari a "bar code", Mika learns that other tigers discriminate against white tigers when dating. The two go to a zebra club, but it reminds Atari that tiger stripes are used for camouflage during hunting while zebra stripes are used to evade predators. Atari mourns that they can not be together, but Mika simply states that if they want to date again, he should search for her in the city.
22	The Snake and the Mouse (ヘビとネズミ, Hebi to nezumi)	April 4, 2023	December 23, 2025	4
Sage, a snake nurse, is on night shift. He hears a crash from a room, and enters to see a mouse named Nectar who has wet his bed. Nectar is angry and insistent that he change his own sheets. Sage states that snakes have no shame or honor (as unlike other animals, they do not wear clothing and are so emotionless that they would flash their penises at other strangers), so he does not need to feel embarrassed around a snake. This calms and amuses Nectar. Nectar asks Sage to sleep with him since he has trouble sleeping alone. The head nurse criticizes Sage for doing so, as sleeping with a snake is considered bad luck. Sage continues to take care of Nectar, learning that the 50-year-old mouse has terminal metastatic cancer. While sleeping together one night, Sage inadvertently constricts Nectar, only stopping when a falling apple wakes the two up. Nectar states that he would have been okay with being strangled, as species with short life spans are not allowed to be euthanized. Sage begins crushing him more tightly, but instead leaves, shedding his skin. Another nurse visits Nectar in the morning, noting that shed snake skins are good luck and symbolize rebirth. Nectar vows to get better so he can see Sage again.
23	The Wolf and the Dog (オオカミとイヌ, Ōkami to Inu)	September 7, 2023	December 23, 2025	4
Adamo, an ex-detective German Shepherd, has a habit of stalking people that he blames on his canine instincts of tracking. He stalks a wolf named Hwasa for over a month. One day, Hwasa leaves the curtains to her apartment open, so he climbs a tree to look into it. He finds her eating flesh and surrounded by plastic bags filled with organs. Hwasa notices him and pulls him into her apartment, revealing that she's been aware that has been stalking her. She proudly claims that they are both slaves to their instincts, with her predating others and him being a stereotypical dog. The police break in to arrest Hwasa for the killing of a goat. Adamo attempts to get arrested as well since he's a stalker, but Hwasa interrupts and tells the police she was just about to eat him. She whispers to him that they're actually nothing alike and peacefully goes along with the officers, leaving Adamo alone in her apartment.
24	The Iguana and the Penguin	July 18, 2024	December 23, 2025	4
South the iguana suffers from alcoholism and listlessness. When he visits the store to buy more drinks, he discovers a lost baby king penguin in the refrigerator in place of his favorite beer. The shopkeeper convinces him to take the penguin home, where it takes up residence in South's own refrigerator and displaces most of his beer. South names him Sam. Sam's presence in the refrigerator interrupts South's compulsion to have a beer whenever he has a panic attack about his failures. Gradually, the act of caring for Sam lifts South's listlessness. When Sam begins molting, South mistakenly thinks he's sick and begins rushing him to the hospital on his bike. Surprised at his own energy, South reflects on his life, wishing he had done more. Sam suddenly leaps, majestically, from South's bike into the ocean. Afterwards, instead of filling his refrigerator with beer again, South uses it to store the letters engraved in ice that Sam sends from Antarctica.
25	The Rabbit and the Wolf	July 25, 2024	December 23, 2025	4
Haru and Legoshi have been dating for three years, and although they spend a lot of time together, Haru is frustrated with the lack of physical intimacy in their relationship. She goes to Juno for advice. She tells Juno how, during their first sleep-over, Legoshi bit Haru's ear while making out and has avoided intimacy ever since. At Haru's request, Juno gives her some tips on provoking Legoshi's canid attraction. Haru aggressively puts her advice into action but is unsuccessful at rekindling a spark. One night, Haru finds Legoshi awake in the moonlight and agrees to go on a walk with him. She reminisces about their time in high school, but when Legoshi prays solemnly for his deceased drama club friend, Haru is reminded of the difficulty of that time, too. Haru expresses earnest acceptance of Legoshi's claws and fangs, prompting Legoshi to reassert how close he feels to her. They return to bed and, after noting that Haru's ear has healed from his bite, Legoshi finally initiates physical intimacy again.
