= Ema Horvath =

American actress

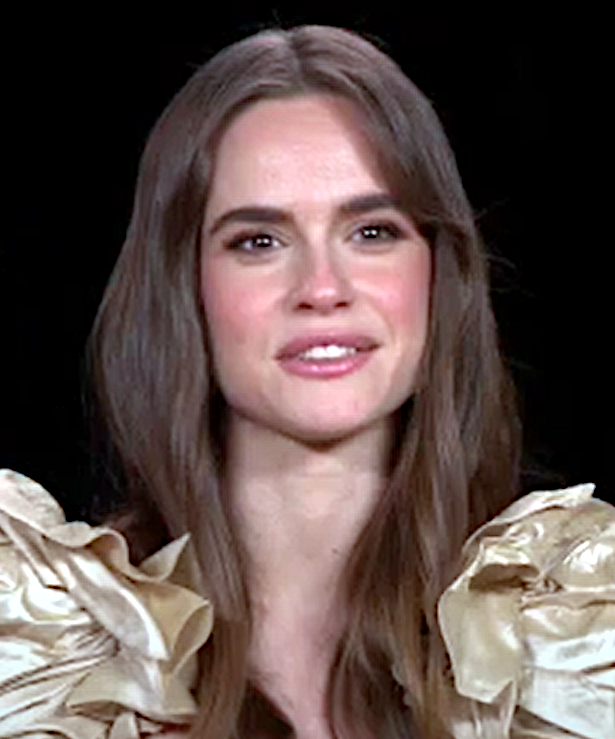
- Horvath in 2022
- Born: January 28, 1994 (age 32); United States
- Education: Harvard University (AB)
- Occupation: Actress
- Years active: 2017–present

Ema Horvath is an American actress. She has appeared in the films Like.Share.Follow. (2017), The Gallows Act II and The Mortuary Collection (both 2019), and What Lies Below (2020). Since 2022, she has played Eärien, the sister of Isildur, in the Amazon Prime fantasy television series The Lord of the Rings: The Rings of Power.

== Early life ==
Ema H. Horvath was raised in the United States by her Slovak parents. Horvath's first experience with acting was at the age of five, in her debut acting role as a tulip at her local theatre. Horvath studied acting for two years at the Interlochen Center for the Arts. She received a Bachelor of Arts in English literature from Harvard University. One of her first roles as a freshman was playing the lead character of Katerina in an all-female production of Shakespeare's The Taming of the Shrew. Horvath graduated from Harvard in 2016 and pursued her acting career, having already secured her first screen role in the film Like.Share.Follow.

== Career ==
=== 2017–2021: Early Career ===
Horvath's first screen role was as Shell in the Blumhouse Productions 2017 psychological horror film Like.Share.Follow. which had its world premiere at the Screamfest Horror Film Festival on October 18, 2017. In 2019, Horvath landed the starring role of Auna Rue in the supernatural horror film The Gallows Act II. The same year, Horvath starred in the 2019 American anthology horror film The Mortuary Collection, which was featured at the Fantasia International Film Festival. In 2020, Horvath continued her run of appearances in the horror genre when playing a 16 year old teenager in the horror film What Lies Below. The same year, Horvath starred in the Quibi television series Don't Look Deeper.

=== 2022–present: The Rings of Power ===
In 2022, Horvath joined the cast of the Prime Video fantasy television series The Lord of the Rings: The Rings of Power, which is based on the works of J. R. R. Tolkien. She plays the Númenórean Eärien, sister of Isildur, and daughter of Elendil. Although her character does not appear in the books, Horvath was keen to learn more about the world of Tolkien, engaging with the fans. Horvath attended both the New York premiere and the London premiere of The Lord of the Rings: The Rings of Power in Leicester Square on August 30, 2022.

== Filmography ==
=== Film ===
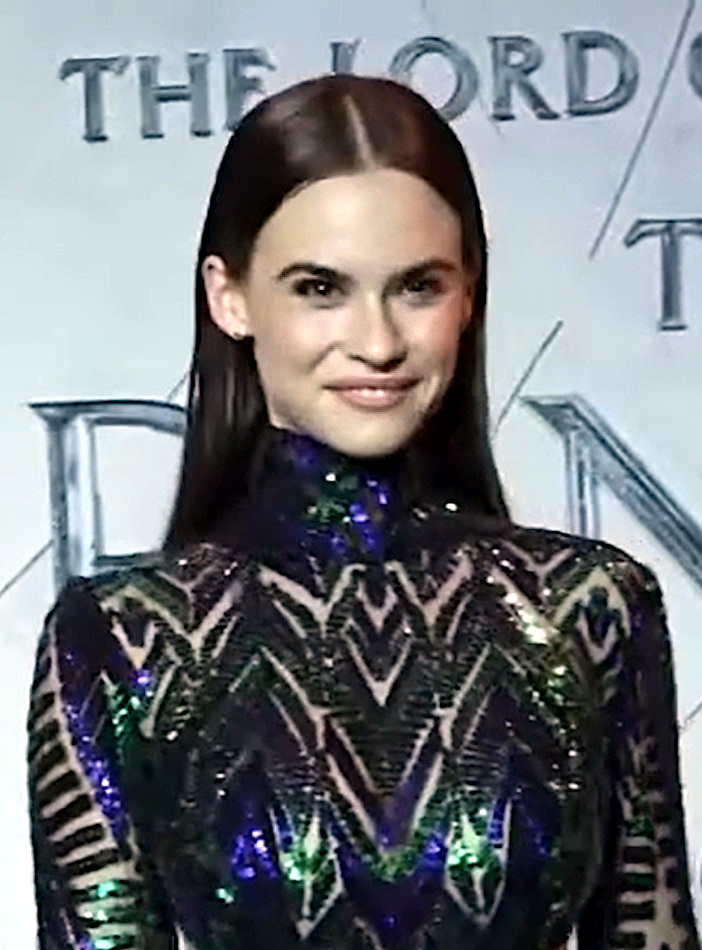
Ema Horvath at the Lord of the Rings: The Rings of Power Asia Premiere in 2022

Year	Title	Role
2017	Like.Share.Follow.	Shell
2019	The Gallows Act II	Auna Rue
2019	The Two Hundred Fifth (Short)	Maxine Laret
2019	The Mortuary Collection	Sandra
2020	What Lies Below	Liberty Wells
2023	Who Are You People	Alex
2024	The Strangers: Chapter 1	Shelly Barnes
2025	The Strangers – Chapter 2	Shelly Barnes / Pin-Up Girl
2026	The Strangers – Chapter 3	Shelly Barnes / Pin-Up Girl

=== Television ===
Year	Title	Role	Notes
2020	Don't Look Deeper	Jenny	11 episodes
2020	Entertainment Tonight	Self	Episode #41.290
2022–present	The Lord of the Rings: The Rings of Power	Eärien	
