= Taika's Reason =

Japanese manga series

- First tankōbon volume cover

タイカの理性 (Taika no Risei)
- Manga
- Written by: Paru Itagaki
- Published by: Akita Shoten
- English publisher: NA: Viz Media
- Imprint: Shōnen Champion Comics
- Magazine: Weekly Shōnen Champion
- Original run: January 16, 2025 – present
- Volumes: 8
- icon

Taika's Reason (タイカの理性, Taika no Risei) is a Japanese manga series written and illustrated by Paru Itagaki. It began serialization in Akita Shoten's shōnen manga magazine Weekly Shōnen Champion in January 2025.

== Publication ==
In October 2025, Viz Media announced that it had licensed Taika's Reason for English-language publication that debuted in July 2026.

No.	Original release date	Original ISBN	English release date	English ISBN
1	May 8, 2025	978-4-253-28641-1	July 21, 2026	978-1-974-71686-9
1. Rain, Burst Forth (雨よ爆ぜろ, Ame yo hazero); 2. Size XXL Uniform (XXLの制服, XXL no seifuku); 3. German Shepherd (限りなく黒に近い茶色の男, Kagirinaku kuro ni chikai chairo no otoko); 4. Dangerous Cinderella (あぶないシンデレラ, Abunai Shinderera); 5. The Grim Reaper in His Snout (鼻に宿す死神, Hana ni yadosu shinigami); 6. Matching Eye Patches (揃いのアイパンチ, Soroi no Aipan chi); 7. A Gentle, (but Difficult) World (優しくないが易しい世界, Yasashikunai ga yasashii sekai)
2	August 7, 2025	978-4-253-28642-8	September 15, 2026	978-1-974-76641-3
8. A Quite-Unusual Sport (かなり奇妙なスポーツ, Kanari kimyō na supōtsu); 9. Pain-Relief Patches on the Tail (尾筋に湿布, Oshiri suji ni shippu); 10. Black in the Colored Water (色水に黒, Iromizu ni kuro); 11. A Promegranate Tree Grew (ザクロの木生えた, Zakuro no ki haeta); 12. Don't Turn Off the Headlights (ヘッドライトを消さないで, Heddoraito o kesanaide); 13. The So-Called Adolescent (息春期ってやつ, Kishunkitte yatsu); 14. Dear Tchaikovsky (Dearチャイコフスキー, Dear Chaikofusukī); 15. Not a Wolf (オオカミじゃない, Ōkami ja nai); 16. With Humans (ヒトと共に, Hito to tomo ni)
3	October 8, 2025	978-4-253-00447-3	November 17, 2026	978-1-974-76865-3
17. Idenshi reberu no kotoba (遺伝子レベルの言葉); 18. Nankakkei no zu? (何角形の図？); 19. Hitomi ni risupekuto (瞳にリスペクト); 20. Kirakira kisu to genjitsu kisu (キラキラキスと現実キス); 21. Yon kē yori senmei na (4Kより鮮明な); 22. Koibito = shinyū (恋人 = 親友); 23. Baberu no ori (バベルの檻); 24. Suzu no tsuita torii (鈴のついた鳥居); 25. Tokoshie no handorā (常しえのハンドラー)
4	December 8, 2025	978-4-253-00895-2	January 19, 2027	978-1-974-76866-0
26. Boku wa haiiro no inu ni naritai (僕は灰色の犬になりたい); 27. Shigaichi no tomodachi (市街地のともだち); 28. Kabe ni ana ari (壁に穴あり); 29. Bikō hoissuru (鼻腔ホイッスル); 30. Momoiro jihada (桃色地肌); 31. Watashitachi wa yunikōn o mitsuketa (私たちはユニコーンを見つけた); 32. Saikō no futsū no otoko (最高の普通の男); 33. Rukkizumu heiwa jōyaku (ルッキズム平和条約); 34. Hitokawa muichaeba (一皮剥いちゃえば); 35. Imikotoba de ai o (忌み言葉で愛を)
5	March 6, 2026	978-4-253-01194-5	—	—
36. Sankaku mimi o shattodaun (三角耳をシャットダウン); 37. Supōtsuman petto shippu (スポーツマンペットシップ); 38. Kuroi bīdoro (黒いびいどろ); 39. Hikitsugareshi pantsu (引き継がれしパンツ); 40. Nijiiro no naka no akairo (虹色の中の赤色); 41. Taika ga kuru (タイカがくる); 42. Ibara no kubiwa (茨の首輪); 43. Dōkoku ga kikoeru (慟哭が聞こえる); 44. Komando wa jumon (コマンドは呪文)
6	May 8, 2026	978-4-253-01332-1	—	—
45. Sonzai Shinai Hanemūn (存在しないハネムーン); 46. Mōken Chūi no Sainēji (猛犬注意のサイネージ); 47. Tachiba Kudakete (立場砕けて); 48. Hajimete no Kirai na Yatsu (初めてのキライな奴); 49. Furokyan Aroma (風呂キャンアロマ); 45. Miwaku no Kidō (魅惑の軌道); 46. Numazoko no Daiamondo (沼底のダイアモンド); 47. Neko don't care (猫 don't care); 48. Kogane no Doku (黄金の毒)
7	August 6, 2026	978-4-253-01868-5	—	—
54. Hosō Sarete te mo Sabanna (舗装されててもサバンナ); 55. Kin o Tokashita Karada (金を溶かした身体); 56. Yōkō to Shimofuri (陽光と霜降り); 57. Gōhōteki na Tobashikata no Susume (合法的なトバシ方ノススメ); 58. Jūnanzai to Heasupurē to Kankoku Kosume no Nioi (柔軟剤とヘアスプレーと韓国コスメの匂い); 59. Tsuki no Michikake Ijō ni (月の満ち欠け以上に); 60. Hachi ni Hitoshizuku no Ame (鉢に一雫の雨); 61. Ore no Toko ni mo Dāwin ga Kita (俺のとこにもダーウィンが来た); 62. Mushoku no Enogu de Akai E o (無色の絵の具で赤い絵を)
8	October 7, 2026	978-4-253-02003-9	—	—
63. Boku Sen'yō no Kyodai na Pūru (僕専用の巨大なプール); 64. Nami wa Itsumo Aoiro Dakara (波はいつも青色だから); 65. Kegawa de Dekita Ehon (毛皮でできた絵本); 66. Hajimete no E wa Kakinaguri (初めての絵は描き殴り); 67. Hipogeumu no Seishun (ヒポゲウムの青春); 68. Taika no Ichinichi (タイカの1日); 69. Chimamire Cherī Bōi (血まみれチェリーボーイ); 70. Tsunaida Te no Naka ni Gurasu (繋いだ手の中にグラス); 71. Gūwa Janai Kyōzon (寓話じゃない共存)

=== Chapters not yet in tankōbon format ===
72. Atatakai Kobushi ga Hoshii (温かい拳が欲しい)
73. Eikyūshi wa Chikai no Yubiwa (永久歯は誓いの指輪)
74. Kurogane no Tsubasa (黒鉄の翼)
75. Minamo no Meimetsu (水面の明滅)
76. Jūjika no Shizumu Chaperu (十字架の沈むチャペル)
77. Onna wa Katsukazan (女は活火山)
78. Hoshi ni Nasake o (星に情けを)
79. Koimoyō wa Shirokuro Pinku (恋模様は白黒ピンク)
80. Homo Sapiensu no Donkan (ホモサピエンスの鈍感)
81. Kuchi ni Ke ga Haitchatta (口に毛が入っちゃった)
82. Hai Endo Juerī (ハイエンドジュエリー)
83. Kyōhakuteki Ote (脅迫的お手)
84. Hajimete Nagurikaeshita no (初めて殴り返したの)
85. Chikyūgata Beddo Rūru (地球型ベッドルール)
86. Kuro wa Sanbyaku-shoku Annen (黒は300色あんねん)
87. Ōji-tachi no Kaigi (王子たちの会議)
