= Who Are You People =

- Directed by: Ben Epstein
- Written by: Ben Epstein
- Starring: Ema Horvath; Devon Sawa; Yeardley Smith; John Ales; Alyssa Milano
- Distributed by: Gravitas Ventures
- Release date: February 24, 2023
- Running time: 103 minutes
- Country: United States
- Language: English

Who Are You People is a 2023 American mystery drama film written and directed by Ben Epstein and starring Ema Horvath, Devon Sawa, Yeardley Smith, John Ales and Alyssa Milano.

== Cast ==
- Ema Horvath as Alex
- Devon Sawa as Karl
- Yeardley Smith as Sarah
- Alyssa Milano as Judith
- John Ales as Carey

== Release ==
In November 2022, it was announced that Gravitas Ventures acquired North American distribution rights to the film, which was originally going to be released on February 17, 2023.

The film was released in theaters on February 24, 2023. It was also released digitally on February 24, 2023.

== Reception ==
Alan Ng of Film Threat rated the film an 8.5 out of 10 saying that "Epstein’s plot is compelling, and his character development is brilliant". In her review on Common Sense Media, Sandie Angulo Chen rated it 3/5 saying "this isn't a typical teen drama centering on an unrequited or blossoming romance".
