= What Lies Below (film) =

2020 horror film

- Theatrical release poster
- Directed by: Braden R. Duemmler
- Written by: Braden R. Duemmler
- Produced by: Kristina Esposito; Linus Hume; Panda Lord; Jimmy Jung Lu; Stephen Stanley; Abel Vang
- Starring: Ema Horvath; Mena Suvari; Trey Tucker
- Cinematography: Jimmy Jung Lu
- Edited by: R.J. Daniel Hanna; Marc Sedaka
- Music by: Gavin Keese
- Production companies: DRF Productions; XYZ Films; 527 Legacy
- Distributed by: Vertical Entertainment
- Release date: December 4, 2020
- Running time: 87 minutes
- Country: United States
- Language: English
- Box office: $21,567

What Lies Below is a 2020 American horror film written and directed by Braden R. Duemmler and starring Ema Horvath, Mena Suvari, and Trey Tucker.

== Plot ==
A 16-year-old high school girl, Liberty Wells, who goes by Libby, returns to her family lake house after summer camp. Her mother, Michelle Wells, is a romance novelist. Libby meets her mother's new boyfriend, John, an aquatic geneticist, who gives her a bracelet with symbols for the goddess of fertility. John explains that his work involves trying to help creatures adapt to changing environments. Later that night, Libby goes to the kitchen, and she hears loud, sexual moaning and runs back to her bed. John stands in her doorway while Libby pretends to be asleep.

The next morning, Michelle and Libby dig up time-capsules in the yard and have an argument about Libby thinking Michelle doesn't care about her grandparents until Michelle tells Libby she felt unwanted by her father. Libby is bitten by a centipede, and John helps her. Michelle falls ill and reveals that John asked her to marry him and she said yes. Libby learns that John is working with parasites. She starts to menstruate, and when John sees the blood, he attempts to clean it up with his shirt and touches her. While Libby showers, John sneaks into the bathroom to smell her through the curtain. Libby removes the bracelet he gave her to find a red mark on her wrist.

Libby asks her friend Marley to come to the house. That night, she sees John walking into the lake, which is emitting red lights. John suddenly appears, completely dry, and tells Libby that he suffers from sleep-walking. The next morning, Michelle starts vomiting and sends Libby into town to get medicine and a pregnancy test. Libby follows a man who looks like John with another woman. She returns to the house and tells Marley that John grabbed her genitals. Michelle says that she is pregnant. Libby is disappointed, and Michelle thinks that she is making up lies about John grabbing her. Libby sees that John has a nictitating membrane and tries to pull Michelle away from John, but Michelle slaps Libby. Libby reveals Michelle's age, which is forty-two not thirty-five, then John leaves. She then investigates the basement and notices symbols on her wrist where the bracelet used to be. She discovers Michelle in a tank attached to an IV, with the same symbols on her wrists and on the walls. Libby hides while John watches Michelle give birth to a dying creature.

Libby calls the police and discovers Marley's body in a water tank being devoured by parasites. John attacks Libby as she tries to escape with Michelle, and she wakes up tied up in a basement. Several men who look identical to John appear and start to peel the walls back to reveal many unconscious women in water tanks. John regurgitates a glowing substance and forces Libby to consume it. Libby awakes in a row of water tanks containing other women apparently in pupae. As water fills her tank, she initially bangs on the glass but then smiles when she realizes she can breathe underwater.

== Cast ==
- Ema Horvath as Liberty Wells
- Mena Suvari as Michelle Wells
- Trey Tucker as John Smith
- Haskiri Velasquez as Marley

== Critical response ==
Cath Clarke of The Guardian rated the film with 1 out of 5 stars and wrote: "A perplexing erotic storyline isn't the worst thing about this sci-fi mystery, which is marred by wooden acting and poor judgement." Jack Wilhelmi of Screen Rant gave it 3 out of 5, designating a "good" rating, offering praise for Horvath and Suvari, but offered negative critique for the film otherwise, writing: "Everything that has been done, from sinister boyfriends to undersea monsters, lacks potency here partially because it's been done before – and sometimes, done to death – and partially because it just barely misses the mark." On Rotten Tomatoes the film has an approval rating of 50% based on reviews from 16 critics. On Metacritic, the film has a score of 35 out of a 100 by 4 critics, indicating "generally unfavorable reviews".

Sara Finkel of Insider accused the film of "confusing Netflix viewers" and called it "[a] soapy thriller" and "a shallow mishmash of horror tropes".
