= Reese Mishler =

American actor

- Born: April 20, 1991 (age 33); Owasso, Oklahoma, U.S.
- Education: Owasso High School; DePaul University; The Second City
- Occupation: Actor
- Years active: 2009–present

Reese Mishler (born April 20, 1991) is an American actor. He is best known for his role in the film The Gallows (2015).

== Filmography ==
=== Film ===
Year	Title	Role	Notes
2009	The Hook Up	Albert Carter	Short
2012	Medicine Men	Colt Rossdale	Short
2012	Picture. Perfect.	Russell Clayton	Short
2012	Occupied	Jason	Short
2012	Wind in the Woods	Jacob	Short
2013	The Doors	Anthony	Short
2013	Trace the Sky	Elijah	Short
2013	Need Each Other	Timothy	Short
2013	The End of Forever	Camden	Short
2014	Her Name Is Leah	John	Short
2014	REAllOVE	Henry	Short
2015	The Gallows	Reese Houser	
2016	The Harrow	Jimmy	
2017	Candyland	David	Short
2017	Bodysnatch	Steven Marra	
2019	The Way You Look Tonight		
2020	Smiley Face Killers	Brandon Douglas	
2023	Living Dead Presents: Fog City	Blake	

=== Television ===
Year	Title	Role	Notes
2014–2015	Youthful Daze	Randy Milhouse	37 episodes
2015	The Interns	David	

== Awards and nominations ==
Year	Festival	Category	Nominated work	Result
2017	Grove Film Festival	Best Actor	Candyland	Won
