= The Gallows =

2015 American supernatural horror film

- Theatrical release poster
- Directed by: Chris Lofing; Travis Cluff
- Written by: Chris Lofing; Travis Cluff
- Produced by: Jason Blum; Guymon Casady; Dean Schnider; Benjamin Forkner; Chris Lofing; Travis Cluff
- Starring: Reese Mishler; Pfeifer Brown; Ryan Shoos; Cassidy Gifford
- Cinematography: Edd Lukas
- Edited by: Chris Lofing
- Music by: Zach Lemmon
- Production companies: Blumhouse Productions; Entertainment 360; Tremendum Pictures
- Distributed by: Warner Bros. Pictures (through New Line Cinema)
- Release dates: June 30, 2015 (Fresno); July 10, 2015 (United States)
- Running time: 81 minutes
- Country: United States
- Language: English
- Budget: $100,000
- Box office: $43 million

The Gallows is a 2015 American found footage supernatural horror film written and directed by Chris Lofing and Travis Cluff. The film stars Reese Mishler, Pfeifer Brown, Ryan Shoos and Cassidy Gifford. The film centers on when, 20 years after a horrific accident during a small town school play, students at the school resurrect the failed show in a misguided attempt to honor the anniversary of the tragedy. It was produced by Jason Blum through Blumhouse Productions, Guymon Casady through Entertainment 360, Chris Lofing and Travis Cluff through Tremendum Pictures.

The Gallows was released in the United States by Warner Bros. Pictures through New Line Cinema on July 10, 2015. It was panned by both critics and audiences, and grossed $43 million worldwide. A sequel, The Gallows Act II, was released in October 2019.

== Plot ==
On October 29, 1993, Beatrice High School student Charlie Grimille is accidentally hanged and killed after a prop malfunction during a presentation of the play The Gallows. His parents, along with the whole audience, witness the tragic event.

Twenty years later, on October 28, 2013, the school attempts to put on a new performance of The Gallows. Football jock Reese Houser auditions for the play, only because this will give him a chance to grow closer to his crush Pfeifer Ross, who will be in the play. Surprisingly, he gets the lead role, which is more than he bargained for. He needs a way out of the play, so his friend Ryan Shoos comes up with the idea to vandalize the set to sabotage the play. That night, Reese, Ryan, and Ryan's girlfriend, Cassidy Spilker, sneak into the school and begin to dismantle the set, only to hear Pfeifer in the hallway. The four try to leave but find that they have been locked inside, and there is no cell phone reception. Disturbed, Cassidy admits to Pfeifer the trio's real reason for being in the school, which angers her.

When they return to the stage, the group sees that the set has reassembled. An old television switches on by itself, playing a tape with the news coverage of Charlie's death, including an interview with his girlfriend Alexis. They discover that Charlie was not supposed to have performed that day, and was on stage only because he was the understudy for the lead actor, who turns out to have been Reese's father, Rick. The group becomes separated. Alone, Ryan sees various things, such as a hidden room with a bed frame and mattress, and a hanging body. When the group is reunited, Cassidy is yanked into the air by seemingly nothing, leaving her with burns on her neck that look like rope burns.

They return to the stage, where Pfeifer points out an air conditioning duct they can escape through. Ryan is thrown off the ladder by an unseen force, and his leg is broken. The group becomes locked out of the stage where Ryan lies helpless. They eventually get back, finding only Ryan's phone. The audience then sees footage from the phone.

Ryan sees a figure holding a noose. Ryan is then pulled away by the neck by a fly rig. As the night progresses, Cassidy is killed by Charlie dressed as the Hangman, a character from The Gallows. Reese and Pfeifer end up on the stage, where the spirit begins to choke her. Realizing Charlie wants them to act out the final scene (in which Reese and Charlie's characters are hanged), Reese and Pfeifer reenact the scene. However, when Reese puts the noose around his neck, he is hanged and killed by Charlie. Once he is dead, Pfeifer and Charlie, now appearing as an adult, both bow, and Alexis, who was watching the performance, gives a standing ovation.

The police enter the house where Pfeifer and Alexis are living and watching footage of Charlie's death, showing that Pfeifer is the daughter of Charlie and Alexis. When they attempt to question them about Charlie, Pfeifer warns, "You shouldn’t say that name". The officer witnesses his partner being dragged by a noose, killing him. Charlie then attacks and kills the policeman, as the screen cuts to black.

== Cast ==
- Reese Mishler as Reese Houser
- Pfeifer Brown as Pfeifer Ross
- Ryan Shoos as Ryan Shoos
- Cassidy Gifford as Cassidy Spilker
- Price T. Morgan as Price
- Jesse Cross as Charlie Grimille
- Melissa Bratton as Alexis Ross
  - Alexis Schneider as young Alexis Ross / Mary
- Theo Burkhardt as Rick Houser
  - John Tanskly as Rick
- Emily Jones as Ryan's mother
- Travis Cluff as Mr. Schwendiman
- Mackie Burt as Cheerleader

== Production ==
Development of The Gallows began in 2011 when Chris Lofing and Travis Cluff uploaded a new trailer for the film. The trailer went viral and was seen by producer Dean Schneider of the company Management 360 who invited them to his office in Los Angeles, signed a representation and financing contract through the production division of his company Entertainment 360 and received to Jason Blum, owner of the company Blumhouse Productions, which specialized in produce low-budget films for the film to be adapted for distribution. On Blum's advice, Lofing and Cluff invested additional work and in fact, over the next two years, the vast majority of the film (about 80%) was re-shot. For this, the two held auditions with the help of a Fresno casting agent, Carolyn D'Vere and three actors were chosen: Ryan Shoos, Pfeifer Brown, and Reese Mishler. Cassidy Gifford joined in at the last minute, after it emerged that an actress who participated in the original version had lost a lot of weight. Gifford was recommended by her famous parents, but Cluff emphasized that she won the role on her own merits, and he himself initially did not think she would agree to participate in the film.

On June 24, 2014, New Line Cinema acquired distribution rights to the film. On December 10, 2014, it was announced the film would be released on July 10, 2015, in the United States. Though the film is set in Lofing's hometown of Beatrice, Nebraska, all of the scenes in the theatrical version of the film were shot in Fresno, California. Several scenes in the first cut of the film were shot in Beatrice, but those scenes were dropped when Blumhouse Productions picked up the film. Those scenes were featured in the DVD and Blu-ray releases of The Gallows. The actors performed their own stunts, and no major CGI was used in the film, Lofing said.

== Release ==
=== Box office ===
The Gallows grossed $22.7 million in North America and $20.2 million in other territories for a worldwide total of $43 million, against a budget of $100,000.

The Gallows opened on July 10, 2015, simultaneously with the sci-fi drama Self/less and Minions. The film grossed $900,000 during its Thursday night showings, and $4.5 million on its opening day. The film opened at number five at the box office in its opening weekend, with $9.8 million.

=== Home media ===
The Gallows was released on DVD and Blu-ray Disc on October 13, 2015.

=== Critical response ===
On Rotten Tomatoes, 15% of critics have given the film a positive review based on 115 reviews, with an average rating of 3.40/10. The site's critics consensus reads: "Narratively contrived and visually a mess, The Gallows sends viewers on a shaky tumble to the bottom of the found-footage horror barrel." On Metacritic, the film has a weighted average score of 30 out of 100 based on reviews from 22 critics, indicating "generally unfavorable reviews". Audiences polled by CinemaScore gave the film a grade of "C" on an A+ to F scale.

Geoff Berkshire of Variety gave the film a negative review, saying: "The Gallows isn't without a certain amount of atmosphere, [but] simply feels borrowed wholesale. That would matter less with a better script, but the four main characters are paper-thin even by genre norms." Stephen Whitty of the Newark Star-Ledger gave the film one out of four stars, saying: "The plot is a collection of contrivances (Oh no, the lights all went out! My cell phone won't work! I'm running for my life, I'd better keep filming!) and the scares are simple, sudden, stupid shocks." Kyle Anderson of Entertainment Weekly gave the film a C, saying: "This is another found-footage movie that, with a little art direction and some actual cinematography, could easily have been a decent little terrorizer. Instead, it comes mostly unglued thanks to its hacky gimmick." Bruce Demara of the Toronto Star gave the film two out of four stars, saying: "Despite its initial promise and some decent scares - you're in for a sharp and sudden drop in satisfaction in the final throes." Mick LaSalle of the San Francisco Chronicle gave the film two out of four stars, saying: "The filmmakers needed to set themselves free even more than the characters, but they never find the path out. They probably never realized they were trapped."

Simon Abrams of The Village Voice gave the film a negative review, saying: "The Gallows is only good enough to make you wish its creators did something novel with its formulaic style, plot, and characterizations." Neil Genzlinger of The New York Times said: "The Gallows starts with a decent if improbable premise, and it ends with a pretty good jolt. But in between, the film sure wears out the already tired found-footage device." Tirdad Derakhshani of The Philadelphia Inquirer gave the film a negative review, saying: "The Gallows is one lazy film. There's no real effort or inventiveness here, whether we're talking about the character names, the jokes, the set pieces, or the predictable plot twist." Barry Hertz of The Globe and Mail gave the film one out of four stars, saying: "As the latest entry in the tired "found footage" horror subgenre, this on-the-cheap film has never met a cliché it didn't embrace like sweet death itself." A.A. Dowd of The A.V. Club gave the film a D+, saying: "Making audiences care about the characters is always a more effective fear-generating strategy than just knocking off a bunch of dimwits in the dark."

On the other hand, Richard Roeper of the Chicago Sun-Times gave the film three out of four stars, saying: "In a quick 80 minutes, we get the back story, we meet the four core characters (all of the young actors do fine work), get the wits scared out of us about a half-dozen times and wind up with a VERY creepy ending."

== Sequel ==
In August 2017, it was announced that The Gallows Act II was filmed secretly. The film was released on October 25, 2019, in theaters, on demand and digital by Lionsgate.
