= Paru Itagaki =

Japanese manga artist

Paru Itagaki 板垣 巴留
- Born: September 9, 1993 (age 33) Tokyo, Japan
- Area: Manga artist
- Notable works: Beastars; Sanda
- Awards: Japan Media Arts Festival Award; Manga Taishō; Tezuka Osamu Cultural Prize; Kodansha Manga Award
- Relatives: Keisuke Itagaki (father)

Paru Itagaki (板垣 巴留, Itagaki Paru; born September 9, 1993) is a Japanese manga artist. She is best known as the creator of the manga series Beastars, for which she has won numerous awards. She is the daughter of manga artist Keisuke Itagaki.

== Biography ==
Paru Itagaki began painting in kindergarten, and started drawing manga in the second grade. As a teenager she developed the character Legoshi, an anthropomorphic wolf who would later appear in her manga series Beastars. She cites Disney movies and the artists Nicolas de Crécy and Egon Schiele as among her early influences.

She later attended Musashino Art University, where she studied filmmaking. She continued to pursue manga as a hobby while in university, creating dōjinshi that she would sell at dōjinshi conventions. After being unable to find a job in the film industry, Itagaki submitted her dōjinshi to editors at the publishing company Akita Shoten, which began publishing her short story collection Beast Complex in Weekly Shōnen Champion in 2016. That same year, Weekly Shōnen Champion began serializing Itagaki's critically and commercially acclaimed series Beastars.

In September 2019, Itagaki's autobiographical manga series Paruno Graffiti began serialization in Kiss. In 2021, Itagaki launched a new manga series, titled Sanda, in the 34th issue of Weekly Shōnen Champion on July 21. In 2024, Sanda concluded its serialization. An anime adaptation began in October 2025.

In January 2025, Itagaki began serializing a new manga titled Taika's Reason in the 7th issue of Weekly Shōnen Champion.

== Personal life ==
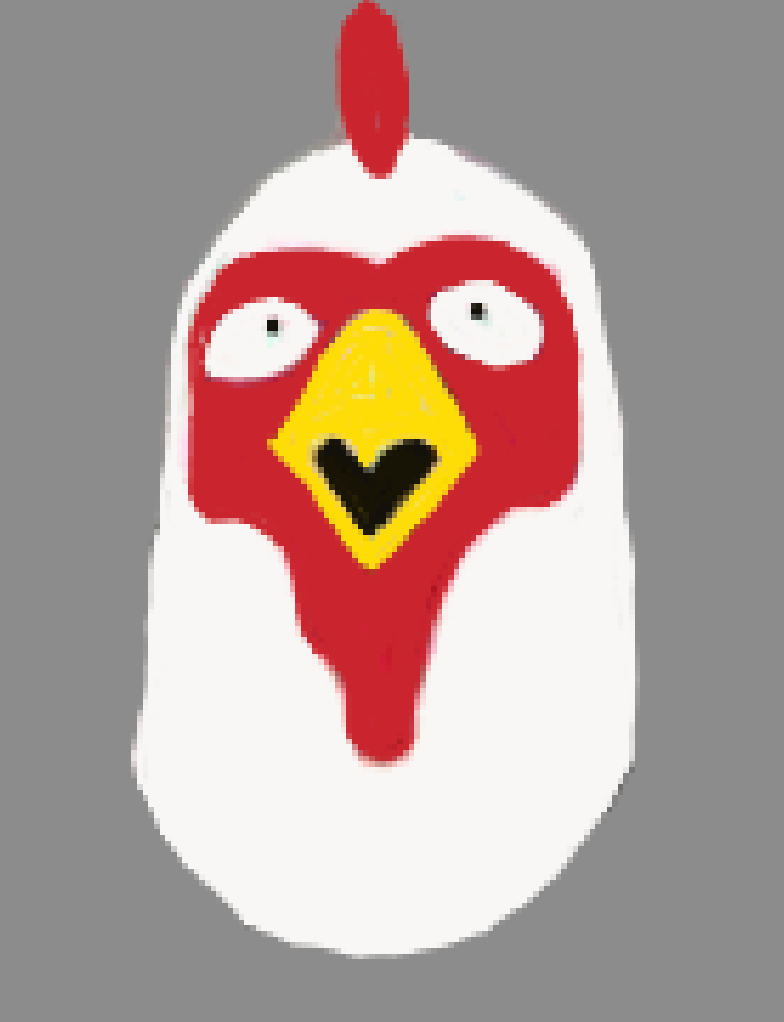
Paru's chicken mask

Itagaki is highly private about her personal life, and wears a chicken mask based on the character Legom in her work Beastars, to obscure her face at all public appearances. In 2018, Japanese tabloids reported that Itagaki is the daughter of Keisuke Itagaki, the creator of the manga series Baki the Grappler. Itagaki confirmed these reports in a joint interview with her father in the September 2019 issue of Weekly Shonen Champion, stating that she did not wish to disclose her parentage until she was established in the manga industry in order to avoid accusations of nepotism.

On September 24, 2023, Itagaki announced that she had gotten married.

== Works ==
=== Serializations ===
- Beast Complex (ビーストコンプレックス, Bīsuto Konpurekkusu) (Weekly Shōnen Champion, 2016–2019; 2021–present)
- Beastars (Weekly Shōnen Champion, 2016–2020)
- Paruno Graffiti (パルノグラフィティ, Paru no Gurafiti) (Kiss, 2019–2020)
- Drip Drip (ボタボタ, Bota Bota) (Weekly Manga Goraku, 2020–2021)
- Sanda (Weekly Shōnen Champion, 2021–2024)
- Witching Hour (ウシミツガオ, Ushimitsu Gao) (Champion Cross, 2024–2026)
- Taika's Reason (タイカの理性, Taika no Risei) (Weekly Shōnen Champion, 2025–present)

=== One-shots ===
- White Beard and Boyne (白ヒゲとボイン, Shiro Hige to Boin) (Weekly Manga Goraku, 2018)
- Manga Noodles (マンガ麺, Manga Men) (Monthly Comic Zenon, 2019)
- Ikitsugishi Futari (息継ぎしふたり) (Monthly Afternoon, 2023)

== Awards and nominations ==
Year	Nominated work	Category	Award	Result	Notes	Ref.
2018	Beastars	Male Readers	Kono Manga ga Sugoi!	Second place		
2018	Beastars	New Face Award	Japan Media Arts Festival Awards	Won		
2018	Beastars	Grand Prize	Manga Taishō	Won		
2018	Beastars	New Artist Prize	Tezuka Osamu Cultural Prize	Won		
2018	Beastars	Best Shōnen Manga	Kodansha Manga Award	Won		
2020	Beastars	Best U.S. Edition of International Material—Asia	Eisner Award	Nominated		
2022	Beastars	Best Comic	Seiun Award	Nominated		
