= Legoshi =

Fictional character from Beastars

- Beastars character
- Legoshi, as illustrated by Paru Itagaki
- First appearance: "Introduction Upon The Full Moon" (2016; manga) "The Moon and The Beast" (2019; anime)
- Last appearance: "The Tale of A Wolf and A Rabbit" (2021; manga) "Interspecies Exchange" (2026; anime)
- Created by: Paru Itagaki
- Designed by: Paru Itagaki (manga); Nao Ootsu (anime)
- Voiced by: Japanese: Chikahiro Kobayashi; English: Jonah Scott

In-universe information
- Species: Komodo dragon/wolf hybrid
- Occupation: Waiter/Deliverer; Stagehand (formerly)
- Affiliation: Udon Bebebe Restaurant
- Relatives: Leano (mother); Miyagi (father); Toki (grandmother); Gosha (grandfather)

Legoshi (Japanese: レゴシ, Hepburn: Regoshi) is the protagonist of Paru Itagaki's manga series Beastars. In a world of modern, civilized, anthropomorphic animals with a cultural divide between carnivores and herbivores, Legoshi is a high school student and gray wolf working with his red deer classmate Louis on settling tensions in the club at school. Legoshi goes across the narrative dealing with the dilemma of a carnivore having a romantic relationship with a rabbit while also exploring a scent that made him nearly want to devour her.

In the anime series adaptation of the manga, Legoshi was voiced by Chikahiro Kobayashi in Japanese and Jonah Scott in English.

Legoshi has been a popular character in manga and anime. He was praised for the portrayal given in the narrative as a result of his coming-of-age arc conflicted with the series' setting, as well as his heroic characterization when searching for the murderer in the anime's second season.

== Creation ==
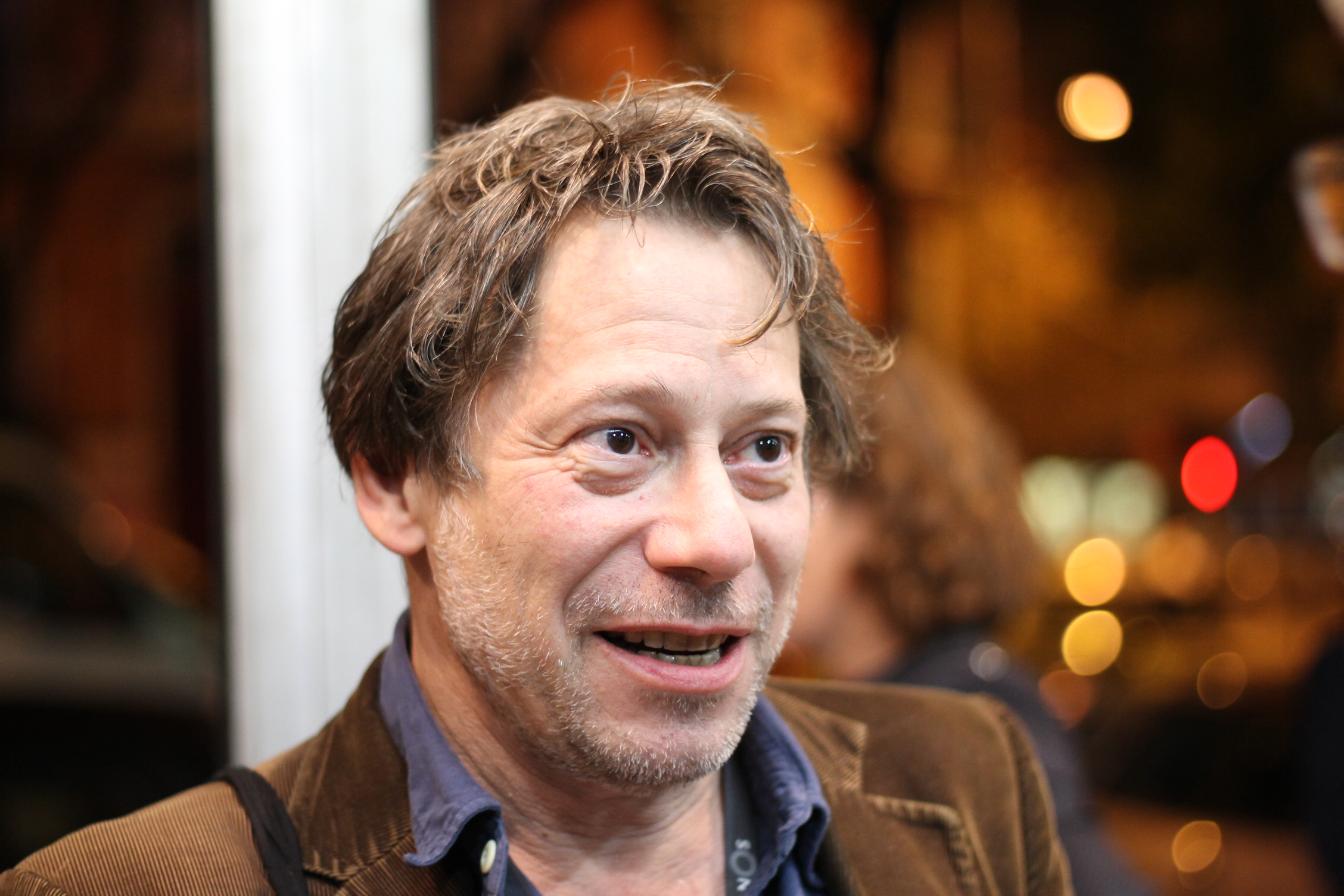
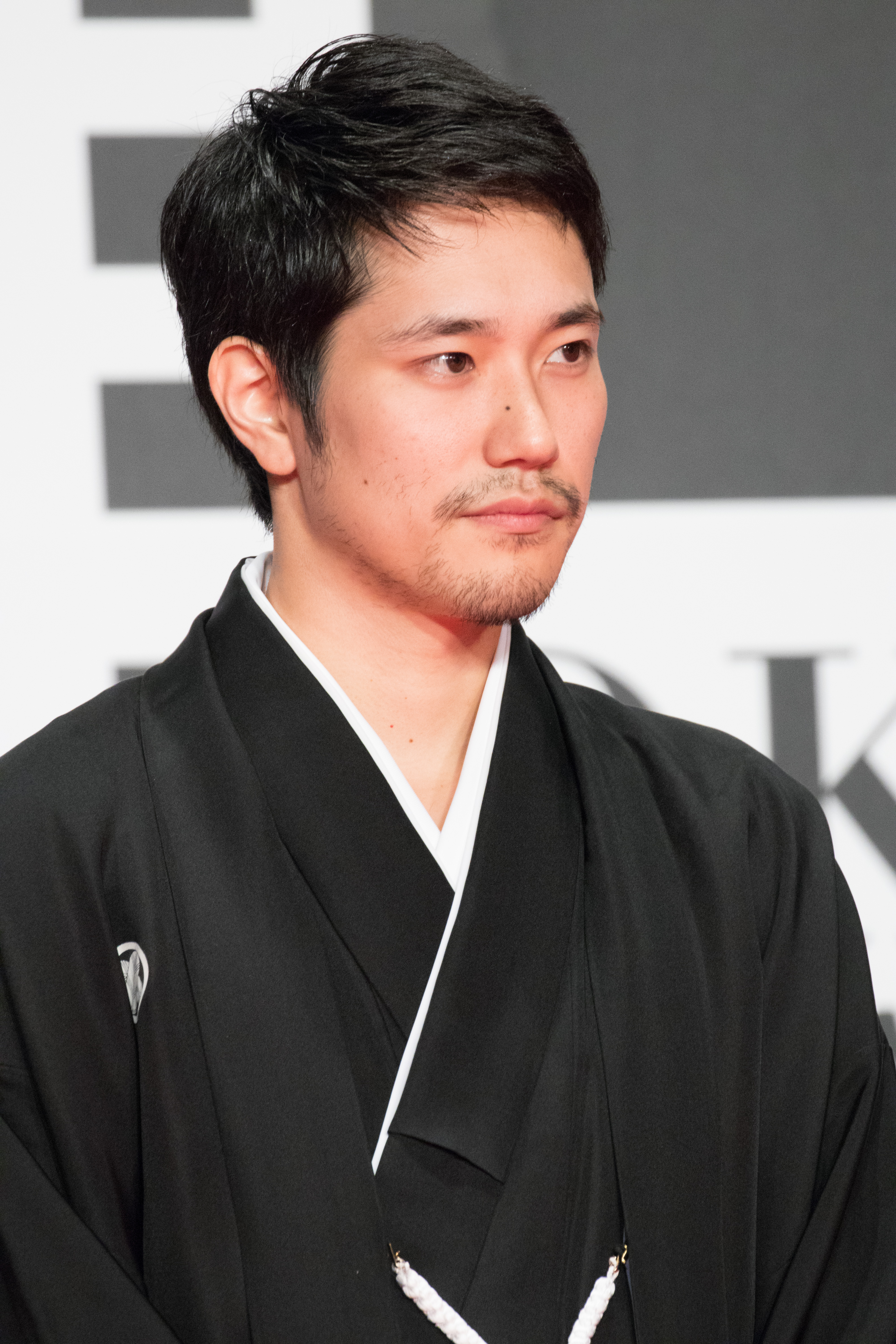
Mathieu Amalric (left) and Kenichi Matsuyama served as influences to Legoshi.

Paru Itagaki said that her main inspiration for Legoshi was Mathieu Amalric. She first saw the actor's work through Le Scaphandre et le papillon, a film in which he plays a completely paralyzed character who can only get his messages and his emotions through the eyes. This inspired the quiet Legoshi, so she had to find a way to make him expressive by the look. The author thinks that it was this point that interested her a lot in the work at eye level. Certain characters, like Legoshi, were planned in mind during her adolescence. For example, some of these characters appeared in her doujinshi series Beast Complex; the prototype of Legoshi was in the twenties and working as a stylist assistant. They have evolved since then, and the author have gradually created a story for them and Beastars is the perfect opportunity to stage them.

The story develops in a world of anthropomorphic animals that live in perfect harmony, starts with the murder of Tem the Alpaca. Instantaneously, all focus shifts to the carnivore closest to the young one that is no other than Legoshi. However, the gray wolf is a sensitive and reserved person incapable of killing anybody, representing the total opposite of a ferocious carnivore. For this reason, the history is led by a character such as Legoshi, whose vision of the world, the author recognized. Itagaki said most importantly, she felt shy about having Legoshi do anything that seemed "manly". He certainly did not go out of his way to act as such. The author further thinks there was some distance in character between himself and Legoshi. She thinks he has grown to be a proper protagonist. Itagaki split down the series for gender, and she was glad so many people sympathize with Legoshi. In regard to the character's design, Legoshi feels more beastlike in color. Had the author made up their colors, it would feel fake. Itagaki stated that she chose to make a wolf character as their similarity to dogs make them familiar to readers and that wolves' "sneaking around" makes them "cute". The name "Legoshi" refers to actor Bela Lugosi while she used Amalric as a model for Legoshi's face. She stated, "I sometimes think of Kenichi Matsuyama when I'm drawing the body."

=== Casting ===
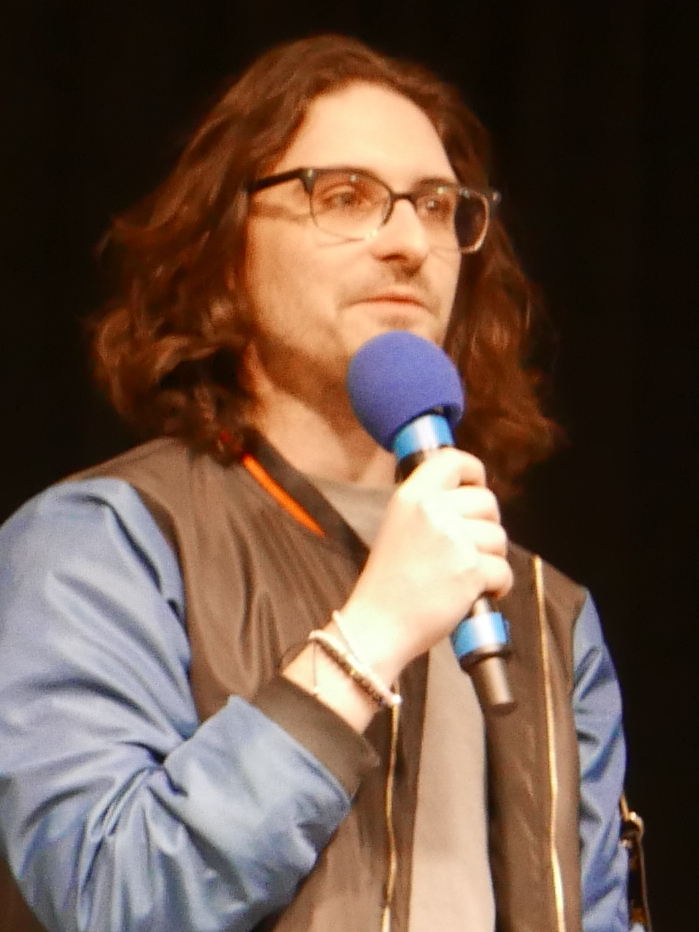
Jonah Scott voices Legoshi in the English dub

The character is voiced by Chikahiro Kobayashi in Japanese. Kobayashi auditioned in the studio, but just before recording the audition tape, it happened to appear on the recommended display displayed in the advertisement on the internet which surprised him. He was told that he could take both with Louis, but he only received Legoshi, as he found easier to interpret for being less cool. His impressions of the role were that Legoshi was a very complex wolf due to the setting and to the handling of animals. In regard to his personality, Kobayashi found him as a clumsy child, which changed upon meeting Haru. In the case of Legoshi, he did not find many changes in the narrative as he felt his arc delicate and stubborn. He related Legoshi to his own youth. He found the love triangle between Legoshi, Haru and Louis complex due to how close all the three are. In the first episode, Legoshi becomes obesessed with eating Haru upon smelling something which gave him a strong impression in regard to what is Legoshi's true self. At first, the impression he got reading the script was that Legoshi should be mysterious. He added he was kind of creepy, too different in the drama club with none of them knowing his depths. Kobayashi often tried sounding calmer or stronger in different scenes from the first season, as he noted Legoshi tended to act differently based on the character he is related with. His final impression of Legoshi was that he was hard to express emotions, which is why it is misleading and clumsy, so even though he had played so far, Kobayashi wonder if this can be conveyed while playing. The actor used different tools while recording the anime to produce the pitch he needed.

Jonah Scott voices the character in English. Scott originally auditioned for three roles and became nervous when learning that Legoshi, his chosen part, was the lead of the series, something which left a major impact in his career and no knowledge about it. He was primiarly attracted by his role due to how Beastars explores sexuality and love in a way that will attract the youth audience. Scott was impressed by the anime's replay style as different actors did the character's facial expressions and movements and thus had less experience than the Japanese actors. As a result, Scott practised several of Legoshi's scenes with other actors besides recording the lines. However, they avoided replicating violent scenes. Nevertheless, Scott found that having a good physical body was useful for his work. He also researched the manga and read Japanese clips. The lipsynch and framerate often provided difficult to the actor. Legoshi became one of Scott's most popular works as it was his first time as a protagonist in the anime.

== Appearances ==
Legoshi, 17 years old at the start of the story but turns 18 years old in Volume 14, is a towering gray wolf. A second-year student, Legoshi works as a member of the drama club's stage crew, and enjoys watching tragic stories performed despite never having had to directly participate in them. He attempts to hide his more terrifying traits in order to better acquaint his herbivore classmates. He takes it upon himself to solve the murder of Tem. Generally conflicted with his status as a carnivore, Legoshi wishes to suppress his predatory desires, which become even more complicated as he develops confused feelings towards a dwarf rabbit named Haru. Legoshi also has a complicated past, having mostly been raised by his Komodo dragon maternal grandfather Gosha, as Legoshi's hybrid wolf-Komodo dragon mother Leano had mostly withdrawn from life and committed suicide when Legoshi was 12. Legoshi inherited Gosha's Komodo dragon eyes with small pupils and an immunity to Komodo dragon venom, though Legoshi himself is not venomous. Jack knows about Legoshi's heritage, but few others do, and at school Legoshi is registered only as a gray wolf.

== Reception ==
Legoshi was nominated for the 5th Crunchyroll Anime Awards, under the category of Best Boy. Legoshi and Haru were also voted as one of the Best Couples in anime in Anitrendz.

Upon his introduction, Anime News Network commented on Legoshi's characterization due to how he is presented. While his attraction to Haru is obvious, the way he reacts towards her sexual intercourse proposal, makes him come across as a more active character, making the narrative more interesting. In another review of the manga where the narrative explores Legoshi's dilemma in regard to his attraction towards Haru, Anime News Network stated that it further explores the world building and the possibility of a carnivore developing such interest for Haru, or it is just his instincts deceiving his mind. However, when Legoshi once again interacts with Haru, the critic commented that the comments Legoshi does not understand about Haru are directly linked to real life women who fear being attacked in contrast to the social norms of males and carnivores. In conclusion, the writer felt that by those volumes, Itagaki did not provide a message to the readers in regard to Legoshi's desire, listing it as a con. Thrillist simply described Legoshi as "a conflicted grey wolf and the antisocial protagonist that 2020 deserves" and praised how the anime makes a major change in Legoshi when he decides to win Haru's attraction rather than being passive and not staying close to her. HobbyConsolas also praised the relationship between Haru and Legoshi as the best part of the series due to how it is portrayed; while The Collider found it as a subversion of common tropes often found in fiction due to Legoshi's shy personality and Haru's interest in sex, and stated "The Beast, in this case, is Legoshi, a rather shy and sensitive gray wolf who spends time alongside carnivores and herbivores alike at Cherryton School's drama club. Legoshi struggles to come to terms with his innate, natural instincts as a carnivore and the conflicting feelings of love and sexual attraction to the diminutive rabbit".

For the second season of the anime series, which focused on the mystery genre, IGN enjoyed Legoshi's role as he searched for the murderer of his friend, Tem, and noted that his obsession towards his goal pushes Haru away from him. Otaquest called Legoshi and Louis "the main focus of the second season", and enjoyed the handling of Legoshi as he searches for Tem's murderer. In regard to the final battle, Comic Book Resources enjoyed the handling of the friendship between Legoshi and Louis as the latter offers his own flesh to help the former become stronger and defeat the killing, sealing it as their sign of friendship. The Fandom Post felt that Legoshi's bond with Louis produced both tension and comedy due to how Legoshi reacts when learning that the missing Louis was alive and working with the Shishigumi. Vincent Jule of the French newspaper 20 minutes praised the personality of the character and described him as "like the students of Cherryton School, consumption of meat prohibited, dormitories separated according to diets. Everything is done to repress the instinct of carnivores, starting with the hero Legoshi who, behind the big bad wolf, hides a sensitive, shy, and clumsy personality". In another article, Collider describes that the use of animal motifs helped Legoshi become one of the best representation of teenagers in manga and anime, citing how his puberty is explored when meeting Haru and struggling with the feelings of love he develops. The difference between these two characters makes the male one cite his own identity for the first time in his life. Through Gohin, Legoshi starts to consider the feelings he has for Haru but starts to question his saviour complex which leads to create several issues. Nevertheless, Legoshi's personality makes the character likable enough for the audience to root for him.

Jonah Scott noted the character's popularity by reading fans' comments on Twitter much to his surprise as there were several users charmed by the protagonist's sex appeal enough to avoid mentioning such lines due to how obscene they were. Anime News Network noted the heavy parallels Beastars has with the film Zootopia with the leading characters Legoshi and Haru having a similar dynamic as Judy Hopps and Nick Wilde due to how different they are yet they remain close. This is further addressed by how both of their societies judges such characters' races. The narrative of Beastars emphasizes primarily on Legoshi's own impulses he was given which are also explored by other characters like Rea Sanka from Sankarea or Shiki Ryougi from Kara no Kyoukai. Juan Francisco Hernández from University of the Andes (Colombia) stated noted Legoshi suffers a major struggle in his life in Beastars not only due to Tem's death in the series' beginning but also because of when he attacks Haru in the first chapters and embarks on a journey to become a proper member of the society. In exploring the character's personality and design, Hernandez noted that the protagonist's shy personality and wolf look is intentional as Japanese folklore use the wolf, alternatively called Ōkami, a wolf-like creature that chase humans and Legoshi is channeled through it to decide whether or not they should hurt others in need.
