= Beastars =

Japanese manga series

- First tankōbon volume cover, featuring Legoshi
- Genre: Coming-of-age; Drama; Fantasy
- Manga
- Written by: Paru Itagaki
- Published by: Akita Shoten
- English publisher: NA: Viz Media
- Imprint: Shōnen Champion Comics
- Magazine: Weekly Shōnen Champion
- Original run: September 8, 2016 – October 8, 2020
- Volumes: 22
- Anime television series
- Directed by: Shin'ichi Matsumi
- Produced by: Shunsuke Hosoi (S1); Yoshinori Takeeda (S1); Kazuki Ooshima (S2); Makiko Kuroiwa (S2); Shunsuke Yanagisawa (S3); Katsuhiko Inoue (S3P2)
- Written by: Nanami Higuchi; Shin'ichi Matsumi (S3)
- Music by: Satoru Kōsaki
- Studio: Orange
- Licensed by: Netflix
- Original network: Fuji TV (+Ultra)
- Original run: October 10, 2019 – March 7, 2026
- Episodes: 48
- icon

Beastars (Note: The series takes its name from the in-universe title of Beastar; an individual of great talent, service, and notoriety.) (stylized in all caps) is a Japanese manga series written and illustrated by Paru Itagaki. It was serialized in Akita Shoten's shōnen manga magazine Weekly Shōnen Champion from September 2016 to October 2020, with its chapters collected in 22 tankōbon volumes. The manga is licensed for English release in North America by Viz Media. The story takes place in a modern world of civilized, anthropomorphic animals with a cultural divide between carnivores and herbivores, and where eating meat (which always comes from other anthropomorphic animals) is strictly illegal. Beastars is set in the same universe as Beast Complex, another manga by Itagaki that originally served as Beastars' predecessor.

An anime television series adaptation produced by Orange aired its first season from October to December 2019 on Fuji TV's +Ultra programming block. A second season aired from January to March 2021. The first half of the third and final season premiered in December 2024, and the second half premiered in March 2026. The anime series is licensed by Netflix. The first season premiered outside of Japan in March 2020, and the second in July 2021. The third season was released by Netflix worldwide.

By October 2021, the manga had over 7.5 million copies in circulation. Beastars won multiple awards in 2018, including the 11th Manga Taishō, being the first Akita Shoten title to receive it, the New Creator Prize at the 22nd Tezuka Osamu Cultural Prize, the 42nd Kodansha Manga Award in the shōnen category, and the New Face Award at the 21st Japan Media Arts Festival.

== Plot ==
In a modern society inhabited by anthropomorphic animals, a cultural divide exists between herbivores and carnivores. Legoshi, a timid gray wolf, attends Cherryton Academy, residing in a dormitory with other carnivorous students, including his extroverted Labrador friend, Jack. As a stagehand in the school's drama club, Legoshi assists its members, led by the star actor Louis, a red deer.

The school is shaken when Tem, an alpaca, is murdered and devoured, escalating tensions between herbivores and carnivores. Meanwhile, Legoshi meets Haru, a Netherland Dwarf rabbit with unrequited feelings for Louis, and develops conflicted emotions toward her. Louis abruptly leaves school to lead the Shishigumi, a lion-dominated crime syndicate from which Legoshi rescues Haru, but later relinquishes control to Melon, a leopard-gazelle hybrid.

Legoshi trains under Gohin, a giant panda physician operating in the Black Market, where illegal meat is traded. Concurrently, Louis investigates Kines, an energy drink containing herbivore-derived substances. The murderer is revealed to be Riz, a bear, whom Legoshi defeats after consuming Louis's leg, leaving the deer with a prosthetic. Though arrested, Legoshi avoids prison but receives a criminal record as a devourer, nullifying his eligibility to marry Haru.

After meeting his Komodo dragon grandfather, Gosha—who once collaborated with Yahya, a horse—Legoshi confronts Yahya. Following a violent altercation, Yahya offers Legoshi a deal: arrest Melon in exchange for a cleared record and monetary reward. Legoshi agrees, but is shot twice during the mission and falls from a cliff. Despite his injuries, he survives. Melon attempts suicide but survives. Ultimately, Legoshi begins a relationship with Haru.

== Media ==
=== Manga ===
Beastars, written and illustrated by Paru Itagaki, was serialized for 196 chapters in Akita Shoten's shōnen manga magazine Weekly Shōnen Champion from September 8, 2016, to October 8, 2020. Its chapters were collected in 22 individual tankōbon volumes, released from January 6, 2017, to January 8, 2021.

During their panel at Anime NYC 2018, Viz Media announced that they have licensed the manga. The first volume was released on July 16, 2019, and the last on January 17, 2023.

=== Anime ===
In February 2019, it was announced that Beastars would get an anime television series adaptation animated by computer animation studio Orange. Shin'ichi Matsumi directed the series, with Nanami Higuchi handling series composition, Nao Ootsu designing the characters, and Satoru Kōsaki composing the series' music. The series aired from October 10 to December 26, 2019, and aired on Fuji TV's +Ultra anime programming block and other channels. At the conclusion of the TV broadcast, a second season was announced. Animation studio Orange returned to produce the second season, which aired from January 7 to March 25, 2021. On July 20, 2021, studio Orange and Netflix Japan announced that the anime series would be receiving a third season. On December 7, 2021, Studio Orange announced that the continuation would be the final season. The final season was split into two cours, with the first part premiering worldwide on December 5, 2024, and the second on March 7, 2026.

The opening song for the first season is "Wild Side", performed by ALI, while the ending theme songs, performed by Yurika are "Le zoo" (episodes 2, 5, 8 and 9), "Sleeping instinct" (episodes 3, 7 and 10), "Marble" (episodes 4, 6 and 11) and "Floating Story on the Moon" (episodes 12 and 48). The opening song for the second season is "Kaibutsu" (怪物; "Monster") and the ending theme song is "Yasashii Suisei" (優しい彗星; "Comet"); both songs are performed by Yoasobi. The opening theme for the first part of the third season is "Into the World", performed by Satoru Kōsaki and Issei, while the ending theme is "Feel Like This" by Yu-Ka. The opening theme for the second part of the third season is "La Feralia", performed by Satoru Kōsaki, while the ending theme is "Tiny Light" by Seventeen.

Season 1 of Beastars was released on March 13, 2020, on Netflix outside of Japan. Its second season was released on the streaming service on July 15, 2021.

=== Stage play ===
On December 4, 2019, the first 2020 magazine issue of Weekly Shōnen Champion announced that a stage play based on the manga was in development. It was originally scheduled for an April 2020 debut running through May in Tokyo and Osaka. In late March 2020, it was announced that the play has been cancelled due to the COVID-19 pandemic. A stage reading musical adaptation was held in September 2024.

== Reception ==
=== Manga ===
By October 2021, Beastars had over 7.5 million copies in circulation.

In December 2017, the series placed second in the list of top male-targeted manga for 2018 in the Kono Manga ga Sugoi! guidebook, placing after The Promised Neverland. The series won the 11th annual Manga Taishō in March 2018, the first time a series from Akita Shoten took the award. In April 2018, it won the New Creator Prize at the 22nd Tezuka Osamu Cultural Prizes. In May 2018, it won the 42nd annual Kodansha Manga Awards in the shōnen category. It also won a New Face Award at the 21st Japan Media Arts Festival Awards in March 2018. The series won the "Shōnen Tournament 2019" by the editorial staff of the French website Manga-News. It was nominated for the Best U.S. Edition of International Material—Asia at the 2020 Eisner Award. Beastars won the Best Graphic Story and Best Dramatic Series in the Ursa Major Award. The Ursa Major awards are given in the field of furry fandom works and are the main awards in the field of anthropomorphism. The manga was chosen as one of the Best Manga at the Comic-Con International Best & Worst Manga of 2019. It was one of the Jury Recommended Works for the French 13th ACBD's Prix Asie de la Critique 2019. Beastars was nominated for the 53rd Seiun Award in the Best Comic category in 2022.

=== Anime ===
On Rotten Tomatoes, the show holds an approval rating of 94%, based on 18 reviews, with an average rating of 8.1/10. The website's critical consensus reads: "Well-made and beautifully animated, Beastars is a solid new anime for anyone looking to get a little wild."

In 2020, the series was part of the Jury Selections at the 23rd Japan Media Arts Festival in the Animation category. Beastars won a CGWORLD Award in the Computer Animation category. It won the 26th Spanish Manga Barcelona award for the Best Anime category in 2020. The opening theme "Wild Side" by ALI was awarded "Best Opening Sequence" and the anime was nominated in 8 other categories including "Anime of the Year" at the 5th Crunchyroll Anime Awards, while the second season was nominated in three categories at the 6th Crunchyroll Anime Awards in 2022.

The Encyclopedia of Science Fiction described Beastars as a thoughtful and rewarding anime, praising its worldbuilding and CGI animation. It interpreted the series' division between carnivores and herbivores as recalling social inequalities such as racism and, more broadly, relations between the powerful and powerless, while identifying gender roles, particularly toxic masculinity, and the question of nature versus nurture as its central thematic concerns. The encyclopedia noted, however, that the effectiveness of this allegory depends on accepting its imperfect correspondence with human social divisions, since factors such as sex and the enormous differences in size and power between animal species complicate the carnivore–herbivore analogy.
