= Kazushige =

- Gender: Male

Origin
- Origin: Japanese
- Meaning: Different meanings depending on the kanji used

Kazushige (written: 一茂, 一成, 和茂, or 和繁) is a masculine Japanese given name. Notable people with the name include:

- Kazushige Abe (阿部 和重; born 1968), Japanese writer
- Kazushige Asada (浅田 和茂; 1946–2023), Japanese jurist
- Kazushige Fukunaga (福永 一茂; born 1974), Japanese broadcaster
- Kazushige Goto (後藤 和茂), software engineer
- Kazushige Kamatani (蒲谷和茂; born 1966), Japanese baseball player
- Kazushige Kawamura (河村 和茂; born 1950), Japanese baseball player
- Kazushige Kirihata (桐畑 和繁; born 1987), Japanese footballer
- Kazushige Kuboki (窪木 一茂; born 1989), Japanese cyclist
- Kazushige Maruyama (丸山 一茂; born 1938), Japanese chemist
- Kazushige Nagashima (長嶋 一茂; born 1966), Japanese baseball player and television personality
- Kazushige Nojima (野島 一成; born 1964), Japanese video game writer
- Kazushige Nosawa (野沢 一茂; born 1976), Japanese professional wrestler
- Kazushige Oguri (小栗 和成; born 1965), Japanese weightlifter
- Kazushige Oya (大屋 和茂; born 1954), Japanese golfer
- Kazushige Sagawa (佐川 和茂; born 1948), Japanese writer
- Kazushige Sanda, the protagonist of Japanese manga series Sanda
- Kazushige Ugaki (宇垣 一成; 1868–1956), Japanese general and politician
- Kazushige Ura (浦 和重; born 1975), Japanese rower
- Kazushige Touhara, (東原 和成), Japanese biologist
- Kazushige Watanabe (渡辺 一茂; born 1974), Japanese voice actor
