= Hiroshi Kataoka =

Japanese entomologist

- Born: Okayama, Japan
- Education: The University of Tokyo
- Known for: insect hormone, insect steroidogenesis
- Scientific career
- Fields: Entomology
- Workplaces: The University of Tokyo
- Doctoral advisor: Akinori Suzuki

Hiroshi Kataoka (ja: 片岡 宏誌) is a Japanese entomologist and a professor emeritus at the University of Tokyo, Japan.

He has conducted research on insect hormones and the prothoracic gland, which secretes ecdysteroids. His achievements garnered international attention, with several commentary articles published in leading journals like Science and several covers in prestigious journals such as the Proceedings of the National Academy of Sciences. His research has also been widely covered by both Japanese and international media.

He was exceptionally skilled in experimental techniques. Before joining the faculty at the University of Tokyo, he managed to purify and identify most of the insect peptide hormones known at the time, including prothoracicotropic hormone (PTTH), allatotropin, allatostatin, eclosion hormone, and diuretic hormone. Notably, his two mentors received the prestigious Japanese Academy Prize (日本学士院賞) for their work on the purification and identification of PTTH, a milestone that had eluded many predecessors.

Around October 2001, he established the Laboratory of Molecular Recognition at the University of Tokyo's new Kashiwa campus as a professor. He supported the young associate professor Kazushige Touhara while an article in Nature reviewed the hiring of young faculty members. As a result, he established a highly productive environment. Of the 20 initial members at the Kashiwa Campus start-up, three were awarded the Japan Academy Medal—Kazushige Touhara, Yuki Oka, and Naoki Yamanaka—Japan's highest honor for young researchers to date. He also played a crucial role as a head of the graduate school system and in the establishment of the Kashiwa campus.

His research was conducted in collaboration with numerous researchers from Japanese and international institutions, including Nagoya University, the National Institute of Agrobiological Sciences, University of Tsukuba, Zhejiang University, the Slovak Academy of Sciences, the University of North Carolina at Chapel Hill, the University of Washington, and Paris Diderot University.

== Early life ==
Born in Mabi-cho, Kibi-gun (now Kurashiki City), Okayama, Japan. As a child, he was known as the insect boy. Hironori Ishizaki, one of his mentors, noted in his autobiography that Kataoka had both the temperament to embrace difficult challenges and a boldness.

== Education ==
Kataoka graduated from the Department of Agricultural Chemistry, Faculty of Agriculture, The University of Tokyo, in March 1981. He earned his PhD from the Graduate School of Agricultural Chemistry at the same university in March 1986. He then completed a post-doctoral fellowship at the Zoecon Research Institute, Sandoz Crop Protection, in Palo Alto, California, starting in April 1986. In July 1988, he joined the Faculty of Agriculture, The University of Tokyo, as an assistant professor. He was promoted to associate professor at the Graduate School of Agricultural and Life Sciences, The University of Tokyo, in June 1994, and became a professor at the Department of Integrated Biosciences, Graduate School of Frontier Sciences, The University of Tokyo, in April 1999.

== Mysterious Political Challenge ==
On January 15, 2025, Shinji Ishimaru, the former mayor of Akitakata, announced the formation of a regional political party, "Saisei no Michi" (Path to Revitalization), ahead of the 2025 Tokyo prefectural election. He stated that candidates would be selected through an open recruitment process. Kataoka, who had already retired, applied and was chosen. During his election campaign, he spent a lot of time discussing insects. The election took place on June 22. Among a field of 11 candidates, Kataoka finished 10th and was defeated. Notably, all 42 candidates fielded by Saisei no Michi in the election failed to win a seat. Yoichi Masuzoe, the former Governor of Tokyo, remarked that allowing candidates to freely develop their own policies without following a party platform—as a path to revitalization—means the group ceases to function as a legitimate political party.

== Awards and honors ==
- 1990 Award for Encouragement of Agricultural Chemistry
- 2024 Japan Prize for Agricultural Science

== Key papers ==
- Kataoka, Hiroshi; Toschi, Anne; Li, Jorge P.; Carney, Robert L.; Schooley, David A.; Kramer, Steven J. (17 March 1989). "Identification of an Allatotropin from Adult Manduca Sexta". Science. 243 (4897): 1481–1483. Bibcode:1989Sci...243.1481K. doi:10.1126/science.243.4897.1481. PMID 17839751.
- Kawakami, Atsushi; Kataoka, Hiroshi; Oka, Tadanori; Mizoguchi, Akira; Kimura-Kawakami, Mina; Adachi, Takashi; Iwami, Masafumi; Nagasawa, Hiromichi; Suzuki, Akinori; Ishizaki, Hironori (16 March 1990). "Molecular Cloning of the Bombyx mori Prothoracicotropic Hormone". Science. 247 (4948): 1333–1335. Bibcode:1990Sci...247.1333K. doi:10.1126/science.2315701. PMID 2315701.
- Niwa, Ryusuke; Matsuda, Takahiro; Yoshiyama, Takuji; Namiki, Toshiki; Mita, Kazuei; Fujimoto, Yoshinori; Kataoka, Hiroshi (August 2004). "CYP306A1, a Cytochrome P450 Enzyme, Is Essential for Ecdysteroid Biosynthesis in the Prothoracic Glands of Bombyx and Drosophila". Journal of Biological Chemistry. 279 (34): 35942–35949. doi:10.1074/jbc.M404514200. PMID 15197185.
- Yamanaka, Naoki; Žitňan, Dušan; Kim, Young-Joon; Adams, Michael E.; Hua, Yue-Jin; Suzuki, Yusuke; Suzuki, Minoru; Suzuki, Akemi; Satake, Honoo; Mizoguchi, Akira; Asaoka, Kiyoshi; Tanaka, Yoshiaki; Kataoka, Hiroshi (2006). "Regulation of insect steroid hormone biosynthesis by innervating peptidergic neurons". Proceedings of the National Academy of Sciences. 103 (23): 8622–8627. doi:10.1073/pnas.0511196103. PMC 1482630. PMID 16707581.
- Sakudoh, Takashi; Sezutsu, Hideki; Nakashima, Takeharu; Kobayashi, Isao; Fujimoto, Hirofumi; Uchino, Keiro; Banno, Yutaka; Iwano, Hidetoshi; Maekawa, Hideaki; Tamura, Toshiki; Kataoka, Hiroshi; Tsuchida, Kozo (2007). "Carotenoid silk coloration is controlled by a carotenoid-binding protein, a product of the Yellow blood gene". Proceedings of the National Academy of Sciences. 104 (21): 8941–8946. Bibcode:2007PNAS..104.8941S. doi:10.1073/pnas.0702860104. PMC 1885607. PMID 17496138.
- Yamanaka, Naoki; Yamamoto, Sachie; Žitňan, Dušan; Watanabe, Ken; Kawada, Tsuyoshi; Satake, Honoo; Kaneko, Yu; Hiruma, Kiyoshi; Tanaka, Yoshiaki; Shinoda, Tetsuro; Kataoka, Hiroshi (2008). "Neuropeptide Receptor Transcriptome Reveals Unidentified Neuroendocrine Pathways". PLOS ONE. 3 (8) e3048. Bibcode:2008PLoSO...3.3048Y. doi:10.1371/journal.pone.0003048. PMC 2516173. PMID 18725956.
- Yoshiyama-Yanagawa, Takuji; Enya, Sora; Shimada-Niwa, Yuko; Yaguchi, Shunsuke; Haramoto, Yoshikazu; Matsuya, Takeshi; Shiomi, Kensuke; Sasakura, Yasunori; Takahashi, Shuji; Asashima, Makoto; Kataoka, Hiroshi; Niwa, Ryusuke (2011). "The Conserved Rieske Oxygenase DAF-36/Neverland Is a Novel Cholesterol-metabolizing Enzyme". Journal of Biological Chemistry. 286 (29): 25756–25762. doi:10.1074/jbc.M111.244384. PMC 3138242. PMID 21632547.

== Other selected publications ==
- Okamoto, Naoki; Yamanaka, Naoki; Yagi, Yoshimasa; Nishida, Yasuyoshi; Kataoka, Hiroshi; O'Connor, Michael B.; Mizoguchi, Akira (2009). "A Fat Body-Derived IGF-like Peptide Regulates Postfeeding Growth in Drosophila". Developmental Cell. 17 (6): 885–891. doi:10.1016/j.devcel.2009.10.008. PMC 4423396. PMID 20059957.
- Lang, Michael; Murat, Sophie; Clark, Andrew G.; Gouppil, Géraldine; Blais, Catherine; Matzkin, Luciano M.; Guittard, Émilie; Yoshiyama-Yanagawa, Takuji; Kataoka, Hiroshi; Niwa, Ryusuke; Lafont, René; Dauphin-Villemant, Chantal; Orgogozo, Virginie (2012). "Mutations in the neverland Gene Turned Drosophila pachea into an Obligate Specialist Species". Science. 337 (6102): 1658–1661. Bibcode:2012Sci...337.1658L. doi:10.1126/science.1224829. PMC 4729188. PMID 23019649.
