= Sean Matsuda =

Playable Street Fighter character

- Street Fighter character
- Sean in Street Fighter III: 3rd Strike
- First game: Street Fighter III (1997)
- Created by: Tomoshi Sadamoto
- Designed by: Kinu Nishimura
- Voiced by: English: Chris Rickabaugh (SFV); Japanese: Isshin Chiba; Mitsuo Iwata (3rd Strike); Ayumu Murase (SFV)

In-universe information
- Fighting style: Ansatsuken
- Origin: Brazil
- Nationality: Brazilian

Sean Matsuda (Japanese: ショーン・マツダ, Hepburn: Shōn Matsuda) is a character from Capcom's Street Fighter fighting game series.

== Conception and design ==
During the development of Capcom's Street Fighter III: New Generation fighting game, the development team found they were running out of time to finish the character Hugo. In an interview, Tomoshi Sadamoto stated they created the character Sean, a headswap of the character Ken Masters, to fill this empty slot. Sean's appearance was created by Kinu Nishimura, who due to it being a headswap created just his face, with the direction to make the character "dark skinned".

Standing 175 centimetres (5 ft 9 in) tall, Sean is a young man with the sides of his head shaved and the top stylized into vertical dreadlocks. His outfit consists of a yellow karate gi with a black belt, and red fingerless martial arts gloves on his hands. Sean's ears are pierced, something they felt was difficult to properly portray in his artwork. Additionally, they had considered having his palms and the soles of his feet be paler, but scrapped this concept during development.

According to Sadamoto, Sean was intended to be a "handicap" character, introduced into the game for players to choose when playing against their friends that may not be as skilled. Nishimura felt the character was too often compared to Dan Hibiki, a joke character introduced previously in the Street Fighter franchise, not wanting Sean to be seen as just in the context of an older character. As times went on though, fans began to see Sean as his own character and someone trying to live up to another character's image, which she appreciated.

== Appearances ==
Sean Matsuda is a young man of Brazilian and Japanese descent introduced in the 1997 Capcom fighting game Street Fighter III. Though gifted in sports he develops an interest in martial arts after seeing Ken Masters perform at a local tournament. Both sides of his family are connected to martial arts—his grandfather Kinjiro teaches him traditional Japanese jiu-jitsu, while his uncles practice capoeira. Sean begs Ken to take him on as a student, with Ken’s friend Ryu assisting in his training. In each of his endings however it establishes he has much to learn, not even making it past the qualifying rounds of a local tournament. Initially voiced by Isshin Chiba, the role was taken over by Mitsuo Iwata for his appearance in 3rd Strike.

Street Fighter V, a prequel title to Street Fighter III, introduces his sister Laura Matsuda who is a fighter that utilizes their family's jiu-jitsu's fighting style. In this game, Sean acts as a supporting character for Laura's storyline. In these appearances Sean is voiced by Chris Rickabaugh in English, and Ayumu Murase in Japanese. Outside of fighting games, Sean also appeared in the mobile gaming titles Sean's Basket, a basketball-shooting minigame released exclusively in Japan. The SNK vs. Capcom: Card Fighters series also features him as an available card, as does GungHo Online Entertainment's mobile game TEPPEN.

== Promotion and reception ==
To promote the release of New Generation, several items of merchandise were created featuring Sean such as phone cards. Meanwhile, for 3rd Strike's Online Edition, player avatar items of the character were released for Sony's PlayStation Network. Sean's image was also used for in-game cosmetic items in Street Fighter 6.

Since his debut, Sean was met with mixed reception. Suriel Vazquez and Eric Van Allen of Paste stated that Sean managed to fluctuate between being one of the best characters in 2nd Impact and one of the worst in 3rd Strike. They further added that as a result of the inclusion of Ryu and Ken in the series, his character became a "shadow of everyone", not popular enough to carry his fighting style, and not enough of a character to stand on his own. Jasper Gavin of Den of Geek felt that Sean took up the mantle of "the guy that sucks" in Street Fighter III, but played in an effective manner. Comparing him to Dan, he noted while both characters took their fighting style in a unique direction, while Dan "just half-asses it and considers himself a master, Sean goes for style points and doesn’t understand why he isn’t succeeding", and in that way illustrated a character overcompensating for his inexperience. In this manner he felt that while Dan illustrated someone that plateaued in terms of ability, Sean represented someone that still had potential.

Retronauts in a podcast discussing Street Fighter III stated that while they were initially quite pleased to see a Brazilian person of color in Sean, but due to the nature of New Generation's development they observed he was a mishmash of attacks from Ryu and Ken, an aspect they felt played into his role as a "handicap" character. At the same time however they argued that his lack of a proper projectile compared to Ryu and Ken seemed to indicate an interesting experiment on the part of the development team, giving players a short-range version of those characters that would have to rely on more basic attacks for damage. They further saw this as an underlying problem with Street Fighter III as a whole and felt it was the developers "not respecting the player", instead giving them experimental and half-formed characters that broke their own established rules. In this sense they felt that while Sean was "the sweetest looking character", playing as him was a miserable experience.

Sean's characterization was also examined in a paper discussing Brazilian characters in the Street Fighter series by Federal University of Santa Maria professors Rafael Arrivabene and Richard Perassi along with postgraduate student José Roberto Cordeiro. In it they observed that while he was defined as Brazilian, he was portrayed as American through the imagery of his red white and blue basketball in both its color and how the sport is reflected as a part of American culture. His fighting style was also shown as exaggerated, comical and incomplete, however his in-game dialogue illustrated him as someone driven and youthful, in this way symbolizing Brasil Moleque culture. In addition some aspects of his fighting style, such as his use of a headbutt, allude to Vale Tudo, a fighting style iconic to Brazil. They further argued that his talent and dedication coupled with his youthful demeanor helped reflect the state of Brazil in the 1990's as a developing culture, and was overall a positive depiction of Brazilians.

The symbolism of Sean's fighting stages and implications on Brazilian culture have also been discussed. In the journal Tecendo Sentidos published by the University of São Paulo, contributing author André de Oliveira Matumoto argued that Sean's stage in New Generation taking place in New York city acted as an erasure of his Brazilian identity. Elaborating, he drew comparison to the character Oro, another Brazilian fighter in the game and a hermit whose stage was illustrated as being in the cave system of Brazil itself, and how it presented America as a place where Sean could pursue his dreams fully in comparison to the exoticized Brazil. In contrast he felt this aspect diminished as the series progressed, with both characters now located in Brazil but illustrating different aspects of who they are as fighters: the sun rising on Sean's stage to represent his role as a pupil, while setting on Oro's to represent his search for an apprentice.

Bruno Costa Guimarães, in his own analysis for the journal Revista Geografia, felt that Sean instead represented another aspect of Brazilian life: the thriving metropolis and the verticallity of the country. This was furthered by his "typical" appearance in contrast to Oro, and the representation of Brazilian cultural aspects such as soccer.
