= Laura Matsuda =

Street Fighter character

- Street Fighter character
- Laura in Street Fighter V
- First game: Street Fighter V (2016)
- Created by: Takayuki Nakayama; Yoshinori Ono
- Designed by: Takayuki Nakayama; Toshiyuki Kamei
- Voiced by: EN: G.K. Bowes; JA: Yoko Hikasa
- Portrayed by: Natascha Hopkins

In-universe information
- Fighting style: Brazilian jiu-jitsu
- Origin: Brazil
- Nationality: Brazilian

Laura Matsuda (Japanese: ララ マツダ/松田) is a fictional character from the Street Fighter series of video games, making her first appearance in 2016's Street Fighter V. She is the sister of Sean Matsuda, a character from 1997's Street Fighter III. She is from Brazil, and much like fellow Brazilian character Blanka, she utilizes electricity in some of her attacks. In English, she is voiced by G.K. Bowes, while in Japanese she is voiced by Yoko Hikasa. Meanwhile in live-action media, she appears in the web mini-series Street Fighter: Resurrection, played by Natascha Hopkins.

Created by game director Takayuki Nakayama at the request of Capcom's Brazilian branch and series producer Yoshinori Ono's own inspirations from visiting Brazil, Laura went through multiple character designs during the course of development. In many of them an emphasis on beauty was placed, as well as capoeira-inspired movements and Japanese views on Brazilian culture. Nakayama in particular wanted her designs to illustrate the character's buttocks, originally wanting them to be exposed due to his belief that Brazilian women develop larger posteriors as they exercise.

Laura received mixed reception: while her moveset and gameplay were praised, her story and lack of character were criticized. Additional criticisms were levied against her character design, which some, including those in Brazil, felt was too sexualized, particularly accusing it of pandering to the male gaze. Academic study also discussed this aspect, with some reiterating these concerns, while others saw her as a more positive portrayal of sensuality and Brazilian culture.

== Conception and development ==
Laura went through several designs, many of which focused on using "sexy" as a gimmick both in terms of appearance and her interactions with the opponent.

Created for Street Fighter V, the character came about after director Takayuki Nakayama was asked by Capcom's Brazilian branch to have a character other than series regular Blanka represent their country in the game. Nakayama wanted the character to be a "cheerful girl", while series producer Yoshinori Ono wanted a beautiful woman with capoeira-inspired movements, inspired by his visit to Rio de Janeiro's Brazil Game Show in 2011. He wanted her to represent Japan's fanciful view of Brazilian women, not necessarily an accurate one, and represent how impressed he was with the country. Art director Toshiyuki Kamei designed the character, building the concept around the keywords of "Brazil" and "Jiu Jitsu".

Many potential iterations were considered from various backgrounds, including a male soccer player that had grown up in a poor neighborhood who fought using a ball and soccer-themed kicks. The design was scrapped, however, due to Nakayama feeling it was too similar to the character Roberto from another Capcom series, Rival Schools. Meanwhile another early concept called "Wild Rapunzel" would have had long, fluffy blonde hair that she would have used to not only attack but shield herself from opponent's attacks. Other designs also followed, such as a very tall woman with dreadlocks and a long reach, and a female physical therapist that would have used moves that looked "extremely painful".

Several designs were more overtly sexual. One would have had her body wrapped in bandages, using them to attack with varying degrees of her body becoming exposed depending on the strength of the attack used. Meanwhile, a design dubbed "Clumsy Cutie" would have featured a girl in patchwork shirt and pants. As she fought, her clothes would become tattered and tear off her body, gradually revealing more of it. While this design was unused, Nakayama considered utilizing it for a stand-alone character at a later time. Other outfits had varying degrees of exposure, such as utilizing a black belt for a makeshift bra, and emphasis was placed on her physical curves, primarily to have her buttocks exposed. Nakyama explained that in his view, "a characteristic of Brazilian women is that their buttocks tend to get bigger when they exercise", and wanted to leave them exposed for ease of movement. Additional consideration was given to her hairstyle, considering options that would give her a "sexy" or "naughty" appearance.

Towards the end of her development, they chose to go with a doji martial arts outfit for a "MMA" themed design focus, making adjustments to have it give off a sense of comfort and speed. While the initial design was more orthodox and casual, Kamei stated as he worked on it he made it increasingly sophisticated. Sources of inspiration during this point of development included Japanese hakama skirts and attire worn by professional wrestling divas. While early mockups featured a Brazilian flag on the back, it was later adapted to a full color scheme for the attire. Meanwhile, her name was based on Nakayama's name for her, Lala, which he felt gave her a Portuguese feel. Nakayama would later give several of Laura's early designs fleshed out profiles and art on Capcom's "Shadaloo Archives" website.

=== Design and personality ===
Laura stands 5 feett 9 inches (175 cm) tall, and her primary outfit consists of a green sleeveless jacket with yellow highlight tied up beneath her breasts, matching doji pants, sandals, and a black martial arts belt across her waist. The color scheme in particular was meant to highlight her "Brazilian femininity" and Jiu-Jitsu, while bracelets were added to each wrist to act as accents to the design. Her hairstyle is long and flowing on right side while the left is styled into cornrow braids, and along with her "voluptuous" body was meant to give her a more pronounced South American look. While the initial plan was to have her rear exposed and only covered by a thong, Capcom Brazil objected, and as a result black tights were added beneath the pants on the final model to cover the exposed skin.

Laura was given several alternative outfits in the game, many of which featured her wearing hotpants or some type of swimsuit, as well as a Christmas-themed outfit and one modeled after the character Gloria from Devil May Cry 4. Her outfit for the game's "Story" mode in particular, consisting of daisy dukes, a thong, and a shirt that exposes the undersides of her breasts, was overseen by Nakayama. He added tanlines to the design as a personal preference, initially worried they may be "overkill" but deciding instead to stick to his personal tastes regarding the design.

According to Johnathan Klein, Street Fighter V English-language voice acting director, Laura's personality was built around the theme of "everyday being Carnivale" for her. They wanted her to be brash and playful, while also sweet to the point it felt as though she were "killing you with kindness." Nakayama meanwhile wanted her to have a "cool" personality and be someone that "understood their own sexiness" without being "sarcastic". He chose early on to make her the sister of an existing Street Fighter character, Sean Matsuda, to further strengthen that character's background.

== Appearances ==
Laura Matsuda was introduced in the 2016 fighting game Street Fighter V. A Brazilian martial artist and sister of Street Fighter III character Sean, Laura was trained by her grandfather in the art of Jiu-Jitsu and comes from a family with strong ties to both traditional Japanese martial arts and Brazilian Capoeira, she looks for opponents to fight to promote her fighting style. She is additionally featured in the story mode A Shadow Falls for the game, which shows her joining the other heroes in their attempt to stop the criminal organization Shadaloo.

Laura is a grappler-type character that utilizes various throws to attack the opponent. Similar to Blanka, Laura use electricity in some of her attacks, including an electric projectile. Meanwhile, her grappling attacks include moves that grab the opponent and slam their face into the ground. Originally Laura's design relied on her using throws to pressure the opponent, however the development team felt this caused her to lack individuality amongst the cast, as many other characters had similar attacks. Combat director Ryuichi Shigeno stated he "hastily" gave her a slow-moving projectile attack, "Thunder Clap", to help set her apart, and was ultimately pleased with the results.

In other media, Laura also appeared in the web mini-series Street Fighter: Resurrection, a prequel series to the events of Street Fighter V. Portrayed by Natascha Hopkins, her role in the story explores her relationship with her family and her involvement with the other characters. In print media, she was featured in the Street Fighter V Free Comic Book Day Special issue of UDON Entertainment's Street Fighter comic series, where she defeats her brother in a Brazilian martial arts tournament by deviating away from their family's Jiu-Jitsu techniques, much to Sean's anger.

== Promotion and reception ==
Laura debuted in Street Fighter V, officially being revealed at the Brasil Game Show on October 8, 2015, four months prior to the game's release. In 2019, a collectable statue of Laura was released. The statue showcases Laura in a blue and purple bikini. In 2022, Laura was featured on one of the covers of the Street Fighter Swimsuit Special 1 issue.

Reaction to the character was mixed. Paste writers Suriel Vazquez and Eric Van Allen considered her one of the most "unique" additions to the series, and while they considered her story elements to be particularly weak, "her spunk and use of Brazilian Jiu-Jitsu make her a solid new addition to the lengthy Street Fighter gallery." Gavin Jasper at Den of Geek was more critical of the character, naming her as the worst addition in Street Fighter V's base roster. While he praised her design and felt she had potential, he described her as incredibly annoying and added her main attribute appeared to be "she’s Sean’s less-interesting sister."

Laura's depiction as a sexualized character with a highly suggestive outfit in Street Fighter V has attracted commentary. In an opinion piece published by Red Bull, Greg Candalez said Laura exemplifies the inappropriate and inaccurate stereotype of Brazilian women by international audiences as being sensual and prone to dressing provocatively. In addition, an article by The Daily Telegraph listed Laura as an example of "porn-type heroines [that] are harming children," highlighting her outfits in the game. Similarly, Christopher Hodges of Screen Rant was critical of her design, saying she was "designed only to be hot and absurdly-dressed and not a character with any actual depth." Brazilian website Universo Online shared the sentiments, feeling that her "hypersexualized" design was at odds with attempts to better portray women in gaming, and further outfits that were released only highlighted the issue further, in particular when considering how other female characters were less sexualized by comparison.

On the other hand, Brazilian journalist Bianca Freitas argued that Laura represented a stereotyped ideal of a country's culture as did many other characters in the franchise, and felt the claims of hypersexualization were misplaced, as in his eyes Laura was no more sexualized than many of the male characters. He further felt that reactions to the character represented a "distortion" between how the world pictured Brazil and how Brazilians viewed themselves. While he pointed out that Brazil was a "universe of cultures", he stated was not uncommon to see women in the peripheral regions of Rio di Jainero similar to Laura, and felt that in Ono's case the inspiration for such a character was indeed apt with that in consideration.

The character has also been the subject of academic study. Brazilian Society for Interdisciplinary Studies of Communication examined her portrayal in the context of race and feminism, where they observe "Laura has her image and her body hypersexualized and objectified for the contemplation of the players." They drew particularly attention to the emphasis on the band between her buttocks, feeling it was "purposely exposed so that the male gaze is met", and was neither practical nor did it suit her role as a fighter. They did however note that through the color of her outfit and bracelets, her character design conveyed "signs that express sensuality, joy, sexualization, miscegenation and Brazilian identity", though felt that when compared to Sean her lighter skin tone instead came across as an example of racial "whitening" to have her conform to "eurocentric" aesthetic standards.

On the other hand, the Animus Inter-American Journal of Media Communication also studied Laura and other Brazilian fighters in the Street Fighter franchise, and felt that while analyzing Laura the combination of her race and outfits "leads to the conclusion that Laura can be interpreted as an iconic quali-sign of sensuality." They further state that she represents "...beautiful and sensual women, where warmth and music are an integral part of life. In Laura is a symbol of Brazil Country of Carnival, joyful, festive and touristic."
