= Ayumu Murase =

Japanese voice actor

- 村瀬 歩
- Born: December 14, 1988 (age 37); Los Angeles, California, U.S.
- Occupation: Voice actor
- Years active: 2011–present
- Agent: Aster Nine
- Website: https://muraseayumu.com/

Ayumu Murase (村瀬 歩, Murase Ayumu; born December 14, 1988) is a Japanese voice actor who was formerly affiliated with the agency VIMS. He is especially known for voicing younger boys, even women with his high-pitched androgynous voice.

== Biography ==
Murase was born in the United States, but grew up in Aichi, Japan. He lived in Aichi until graduating from high school, after which he attended university in Kyoto Prefecture. Later, he moved to Tokyo.

After showing an interest in theatre, Murase joined the Japan Narration Actors Institute with the aim of becoming a voice actor. In 2011, he made his debut as a voice actor in the role of a male student in the TV anime Persona 4: The Animation. The following year, he played the first main character in the role of Shun Aonuma (14 years old) in From the New World. In 2014, he starred in the role of Shoyo Hinata in Haikyu!!.

In 2016, Murase won the Seiyu Award for Best Male Rookie.

Murase left VIMS and established his own agency Aster Nine on April 30, 2023.

== Filmography ==
=== Television animation ===
Year	Series	Role	Ref.
2012	From the New World	Shun Aonuma (14 years old)	
2012	Kids on the Slope	Shigetora Maruo	
2012	My Little Monster	Takaya Mizutani, Haru Yoshida (young)	
2012	Sword Art Online	Shinichi Nagata/Recon	
2013	Gatchaman Crowds	Rui Ninomiya	
2013	Love Lab	Yū Yamazaki	
2013	Majestic Prince	Patrick Hoyle	
2013	My Teen Romantic Comedy SNAFU	Taishi Kawasaki	
2013	Nagi no Asukara	Atsushi Minegishi	
2014	Chaika - The Coffin Princess	Guy	
2014	Fairy Tail	Uosuke	
2014	Future Card Buddyfight	Ryo Mobutani, Kakumo Maihama	
2014	Gundam Build Fighters Try	Toshiya Shiki (Team SD-R)	
2014	Haikyu!!	Shoyo Hinata	
2014	Invaders of the Rokujyōma!?	Kotarō	
2014	M3 the dark metal	Heito Isaku	
2014	Mysterious Joker	Joker	
2014	Nobunaga Concerto	Mori Ranmaru	
2014	Nobunagun	Antoni Gaudí	
2014	Noragami	Manabu Ogiwara	
2014	Parasyte	Joe	
2014	Silver Spoon	Kenta Ishiyama	
2014	The Irregular at Magic High School	Shinkurō Kichijōji	
2014	Wolf Girl and Black Prince	Yuu Kusakabe	
2014	Yu-Gi-Oh! Arc-V	Halil	
2015	Assassination Classroom	Yūji Norita	
2015	Castle Town Dandelion	Haruka Sakurada	
2015	Concrete Revolutio	Yumihiko Otonashi	
2015	Durarara!!x2	Neko	
2015	Gangsta.	Wallace "Worick" Arcangelo (young)	
2015	Gatchaman Crowds insight	Rui Ninomiya	
2015	Haikyu!! 2	Shoyo Hinata	
2015	Kamisama Kiss◎	Year God	
2015	Makura no Danshi	Haruto Enokawa	
2015	Mysterious Joker Season 2	Joker	
2015	Noragami Aragoto	Manabu Ogiwara	
2015	Overlord	Nfirea Bareare	
2015	Show by Rock!!	Riku	
2015	The Testament of Sister New Devil Burst	Luka	
2015	Ushio and Tora	Baldanders	
2015	Utawarerumono: The False Faces	Kiuru	
2016	Ajin: Demi-Human	Tito	
2016	Bananya	Bananyako, Tabby Bananya, Mackerel Bananya, Baby Bananya, Bananya Bunch, The Mice	
2016	Battery	Fumito Sawaguchi	
2016	Bungo Stray Dogs	Sergeant Sugimoto	
2016	Cheer Boys!!	Ryūzō Sakuma	
2016	Concrete Revolutio: The Last Song	Yumihiko Otonashi	
2016	D.Gray-man Hallow	Allen Walker	
2016	Divine Gate	Bruno, Sigurd	
2016	First Love Monster	Kazuo Noguchi	
2016	Go! Princess PreCure	Prince	
2016	Haikyū!! Karasuno High School vs Shiratorizawa Academy	Shoyo Hinata	
2016	Haven't You Heard? I'm Sakamoto	Yuto	
2016	Mysterious Joker Seasons 3 and 4	Joker	
2016	Nobunaga no Shinobi	Sukezo	
2016	Servamp	Hugh the Dark Algernon III	
2016	Shōnen Maid	Madoka Takatori (teenage)	
2016	Super Lovers	Ikuyoshi Sasaki	
2016	Touken Ranbu: Hanamaru	Sayo Samonji	
2016	Twin Star Exorcists	Yuto Ijika	
2016	Yuri!!! on Ice	Kenjirō Minami	
2017	Altair: A Record of Battles	Tuğril Mahmut	
2017	ACCA: 13-Territory Inspection Dept.	Acca-kun	
2017	Altair: A Record of Battles	Mahmut	
2017	Black Clover	Luck Voltia	
2017	Blue Exorcist: Kyoto Saga	Karura	
2017	ēlDLIVE	Chūta Kokonose	
2017	Hand Shakers	Masaru Hojo	
2017	Kamiwaza Wanda	Naisu	
2017	Super Lovers 2	Ikuyoshi Sasaki	
2017	The Ancient Magus' Bride	Cartaphilius/Joseph	
2018	Banana Fish	Skip	
2018	Devilman Crybaby	Ryo Asuka	
2018	Doreiku	Taiju Nakano	
2018	Hinomaru Sumo	Kei Mitsuhashi	
2018	Inazuma Eleven: Ares	Asuto Inamori	
2018	Iroduku: The World in Colors	Chigusa Fukasawa	
2018	Last Period	Gajeru, Tori Himemiya	
2018	Muhyo & Roji's Bureau of Supernatural Investigation	Tōru Muhyō	
2018	Nil Admirari no Tenbin: Teito Genwaku Kitan	Hitaki Kuze	
2018	Pop Team Epic	Joseph (ep 9a)	
2018	Skull-face Bookseller Honda-san	Azarashi	
2018	The Thousand Musketeers	Nicola and Noël	
2018	Touken Ranbu: Hanamaru 2	Sayo Samonji	
2018	Yarichin Bitch Club	Kyōsuke Yaguchi	
2019	Ace of Diamond Act II	Kaoru Yui	
2019	Bananya: Fushigi na Nakamatachi	Bananyako, Tabby Bananya, Mackerel Bananya, Baby Bananya, Bananya Bunch, The Mice	
2019	Case File nº221: Kabukicho	Maki Hokari	
2019	Dr. Stone	Ginro	
2019	Ensemble Stars!	Tori Himemiya	
2019	Kochoki: Wakaki Nobunaga	Oda Hidetaka	
2019	My Roommate is a Cat	Hachi	
2019	Sarazanmai	Kazuki Yasaka	
2019	Welcome to Demon School! Iruma-kun	Iruma Suzuki	
2020	Attack on Titan: The Final Season	Udo	
2020	Haikyu!! To the Top	Shoyo Hinata	
2020	Infinite Dendrogram	Hugo Lesseps	
2020	Ikebukuro West Gate Park	Mitsuki Fujimoto	
2020	Kakushigoto	Kakeru Keshi	
2020	Listeners	Echo Rec	
2020	Muhyo & Roji's Bureau of Supernatural Investigation Season 2	Tōru Muhyō	
2020	Number24	Yū Mashiro	
2021	Backflip!!	Mashiro Tsukiyuki	
2021	Battle Game in 5 Seconds	Akira Shiroyanagi	
2021	Burning Kabaddi	Yūki Hitomi	
2021	How Not to Summon a Demon Lord Ω	Sanro	
2021	I-Chu: Halfway Through the Idol	Kokoro Hanabusa	
2021	Kemono Jihen	Akira	
2021	Megaton Musashi	Kota Akutagawa	
2021	Nintama Rantarō	Haniwa Sekito	
2021	Pretty Boy Detective Club	Manabu Sōtōin	
2021	Ranking of Kings	Kage	
2021	Show by Rock!! Stars!!	Riku	
2021	The Case Study of Vanitas	Astolfo Granatum	
2021	The Faraway Paladin	Menel	
2021	World Trigger 2nd Season	Reghindetz	
2022	Love of Kill	Jinon	
2022	Ninjala	Kappei	
2022	Salaryman's Club	Ayato Misora	
2022	She Professed Herself Pupil of the Wise Man	Solomon	
2022	Prima Doll	Nagi Tōma	
2022	Utawarerumono: Mask of Truth	Kiuru	
2022	My Master Has No Tail	Sakujiro	
2022	Chainsaw Man	Aki Hayakawa (young)	
2023	The Vampire Dies in No Time 2	Mikazuki	
2023	Kaina of the Great Snow Sea	Yaona	
2023	Trigun Stampede	Elendira the Crimsonnail	
2023	Soaring Sky! Pretty Cure	Tsubasa Yuunagi/Cure Wing	
2023	Skip and Loafer	Kento Yamada	
2023	I Got a Cheat Skill in Another World and Became Unrivaled in the Real World, Too	Shingo Kurata	
2023	Am I Actually the Strongest?	Hart Zenfis	
2023	Sweet Reincarnation	Pastry Mill Morteln	
2023	Ragna Crimson	Crimson	
2023	Migi & Dali	Dali	
2023	Paradox Live the Animation	Yeon Hajun	
2023	Shy	Mian Long	
2023	Dead Mount Death Play	Arius Sabaramond	
2023	Undead Unluck	Chikara Shigeno	
2024	Four Knights of the Apocalypse	Tristan	
2024	Delicious in Dungeon	Yaad	
2024	I Parry Everything	Rolo	
2024	Tower of God 2nd Season	Mule Love	
2024	I'll Become a Villainess Who Goes Down in History	Finn Smith	
2024	Haigakura	Heikan	
2024	Okaimono Panda!	Puchomaru	
2024	Blue Miburo	Seto	
2024	Delico's Nursery	Sophie Anderson	
2025	I'm a Noble on the Brink of Ruin, So I Might as Well Try Mastering Magic	Liam	
2025	Promise of Wizard	Mitile	
2025	Ishura Season 2	Mestelexil the Box of Desperate Knowledge	
2025	Rurouni Kenshin: Kyoto Disturbance	Honjō Kamatari	
2025	Classic Stars	Lost Schumann	
2025	#Compass 2.0: Combat Providence Analysis System	Tesla	
2025	Dekin no Mogura	Kyōshirō Nekozuku	
2025	Reincarnated as a Neglected Noble: Raising My Baby Brother with Memories from My Past Life	Igor	
2025	The Water Magician	Ryō	
2025	Campfire Cooking in Another World with My Absurd Skill	Dora	
2025	Sanda	Kazushige Sanda	
2026	There Was a Cute Girl in the Hero's Party, So I Tried Confessing to Her	Raven	
2026	Yoroi-Shinden Samurai Troopers	Musashi Hōjō	
2026	Petals of Reincarnation	A. Hitler	
2026	An Observation Log of My Fiancée Who Calls Herself a Villainess	Shawn Turquoin Alphasta	
2026	Daemons of the Shadow Realm	Gabriel, Scavenger, Kodetsu, Jiro, Ohagi, Daifuku, Asagiri, Fujin, Raijin	
2026	Nippon Sangoku	Tonotsugu Taira	
2026	Kujima: Why Sing, When You Can Warble?	Arata Kōda	
2026	Scum of the Brave	Lord Hazeru Seito	
2026	Goodbye, Lara	Luca	
2026	The Elusive Samurai	Shiba Ienaga	
2026	Uncle's Obsession with Cute Things	Masumi Nii	
2026	Suikoden: The Anime	Luc	
2027	Welcome to Demon School! Iruma-kun: IruMafia Edition	Iruma	
2027	Inherit the Winds	Tōdō Heisuke	
2027	Now That We Draw	Yuuki Uehara	
2027	Shōzen	Chiro	
2027	Soara and the House of Monsters	Kirik	

=== Theatrical animation ===
Year	Title	Role	Ref.
2015	The Empire of Corpses	Friday	
2018	Servamp -Alice in the Garden-	Hugh	
2018	Natsume's Book of Friends the Movie: Tied to the Temporal World	Daisuke Yūki	
2022	Goodbye, Don Glees!	Shizuku "Drop" Sakuma	
2022	Blue Thermal	Eita Narihara	
2022	Backflip!!	Mashiro Tsukiyuki	
2022	The Seven Deadly Sins: Grudge of Edinburgh	Tristan (teenager)	
2022	Drifting Home	Noppo	
2023	Detective Conan: Black Iron Submarine	Pinga	
2023	Sailor Moon Cosmos	Sailor Aluminum Siren	
2023	Black Clover: Sword of the Wizard King	Luck Voltia	
2023	The Concierge at Hokkyoku Department Store	Barbary Lion	
2023	My Next Life as a Villainess: All Routes Lead to Doom! The Movie	Qumiit	
2024	Haikyu!! The Dumpster Battle	Shoyo Hinata	
2024	Fuuto PI: The Portrait of Kamen Rider Skull	Shōtarō Hidari (young)	
2024	Pui Pui Molcar The Movie MOLMAX	Canon	
2025	Dive in Wonderland	Tweedledee	
2026	Paris ni Saku Étoile	Thomas	

=== Original video animation (OVA) ===
- Haikyu!! (2014), Shoyo Hinata
- Yarichin Bitch Club (2018), Kyōsuke Yaguchi

=== Original net animation (ONA) ===
- Sword Gai The Animation (2018), Kuromaru
- Baki the Grappler (2018), Gaia
- The Heike Story (2021), Taira no Atsumori
- Spriggan (2022), Colonel McDougal
- Record of Ragnarok II (2023), Zerofuku
- Sand Land: The Series (2024), Muniel
- Devils' Crest (2026), Kakeru Niki

=== Multimedia Project ===
- Paradox live / BAE (2019) (48 / Yeon Hajun)
- Clock over orquesta (2021) (Tenma Rikka)
- VS AMBIVALENZ (2021) (Auguri & Futaba)

=== Video games ===
2012

- Puzzle & Dragons (2012) (Suou)

2014

- Azure Striker Gunvolt (2014) (Nova/Shiden)
- J-Stars Victory Vs (2014) (Shōyō Hinata)
- Granblue Fantasy (2014) (Hal, Ulamnuran)
- THE iDOLM@STER: SideM (2014) (Kanon Himeno)
- Hamatora: Look at Smoking World (2014) (Pero)

2015

- I-Chu (2015) (Kokoro Hanabusa)
- Ensemble Stars! (2015) (Tori Himemiya)
- Digimon Story: Cyber Sleuth (2015) (Yuugo Kamishiro)
- Sword Art Online: Lost Song (2015) (Recon/Shinichi Nagata)
- Tokyo Mirage Sessions ♯FE (2015) (Gordin)
- Touken Ranbu (2015) (Sayo Samonji)
- Utawarerumono: Mask of Deception (2015) (Kiuru)

2016

- Street Fighter V (2016) (Sean Matsuda)
- Mighty No. 9 (2016) (Beck)
- Pokémon Sun and Moon (2016) (Wishiwashi)
- Final Fantasy XV (2016) (Talcott (teenage))
- Utawarerumono: Mask of Truth (2016) (Kiuru)
- Pop'n Music Usagi to Neko to Shōnen no Yume (2016) (NAVI)

2017

- Cocktail Prince (2017) (Caipirinha & Caipiroska)
- Fire Emblem Heroes (2017) (Gordin and Soren)
- Sengoku Night Blood (2017) (Sasuke Sarutobi)
- Super Bomberman R (2017) (Green Bomberman)
- Xenoblade Chronicles 2 (2017) (Corvin/Kamuya)
- Digimon Story: Cyber Sleuth - Hacker's Memory (2017) (Yuugo Kamishiro)
- Captain Tsubasa: Dream Team (2017) (Aoi Shingo)

2018

- Food Fantasy (2018) (Double Scoop & Long Bao)
- Dragalia Lost (2018) (Irfan)
- Ikemen Revolution (2016) (Loki Genetta)
- Chrono Ma:Gia (2018) (Leo Bloomfield)
- Dragon: Marked for Death (2019) (Shinobi) (Voice D)
- Bleach: Brave Souls (2018) (Hikone Ubuginu)
- Alchemia Story (2018) (Als)
- Grand Chase Dimensional Chaser (2018) (Ronan Erudon)

2019

- Onmyoji (2019) (Ungaikyou)
- Edge of Awakening (2019) (Shiou)
- Pokémon Masters (2019) (Wally)
- World Flipper (2019) (Adoni)
- Mahoutsukai no Yakusoku (2019) (Mitile)

2020

- Ninjala (2020) (Kappei)
- Genshin Impact (2020) (Venti)

2021

- Fate/Grand Order (2021) (Setanta)
- Rune Factory 5 (2021) (Cecile)
- Arknights (2021) (Mizuki)
- Identity V (2021) (Victor Grantz)
- Helios Rising Heroes (2021) (Leonard Wright Jr.)
- Fuga: Melodies of Steel (2021) (Malt Marzipan)

2023

- Bayonetta Origins: Cereza and the Lost Demon (2023) (Lukaon)
- Fuga: Melodies of Steel 2 (2023) (Malt Marzipan)

2025

- Shuten Order (2025) (Teko Ion)

=== Live-action films ===
- Acma:Game: The Final Key (2024) (voice of Baleia)
- Meets the World (2025) (voice of an anime character)

=== Tokusatsu ===
- Avataro Sentai Donbrothers Don Murasame (Voice)

=== Dubbing ===
==== Live-action ====
- The 100 (Monty Green (Christopher Larkin))
- Aquaman (Young Arthur (Thirteen Years Old) (Otis Dhanji))
- Beasts of No Nation (Agu (Abraham Attah))
- Boychoir (Stetson "Stet" Tate (Garrett Wareing))
- Daniel Isn't Real (Luke Nightingale (Miles Robbins))
- Daredevil (Matt Murdock (young) (Skylar Gaertner))
- The Dark Tower (Jake Chambers (Tom Taylor))
- Euphoria (Ashtray (Javon "Wanna" Walton))
- Falling Skies (season 4 onwards) (Matt Mason (Maxim Knight))
- The Flash (Wally West/Kid Flash (Keiynan Lonsdale))
- The Games Maker (Ivan Drago (David Mazouz))
- How to Train Your Dragon (Fishlegs Ingerman (Julian Dennison))
- Insidious: Chapter 2 (Dalton Lambert (Ty Simpkins))
- Jurassic World (2017 NTV edition) (Gray Mitchell (Ty Simpkins))
- The Last Ship (Ray Diaz (Adam Irigoyen))
- The Maze Runner (Chuck (Blake Cooper))
- Michael (Michael Jackson (Jaafar Jackson))
- A Minecraft Movie (Henry (Sebastian Hansen))
- The Monkey (Hal and Bill Shelburn (young) (Christian Convery))
- Once Upon a Time (Baelfire (young) (Dylan Schmid))
- Paper Towns (Benjamin "Ben" Starling (Austin Abrams))
- Rent (Angel Dumott Schunard (Wilson Jermaine Heredia))
- Shazam! (2021 THE CINEMA edition) (Freddy Freeman (Jack Dylan Grazer))
- St. Vincent (Robert Ocinski (Dario Barosso))
- Uncharted (Young Nathan Drake (Tiernan Jones))

==== Animation ====
- The Boss Baby: Family Business (Connie, Bad Idea Baby)
- Dragon Raja: The Blazing Dawn (Lu Mingze)
- Mechamato (Amato)
- Sing (Howie)
- Thunderbirds Are Go (Alan Tracy)
