= Kazushige Sanda =

Fictional character from Sanda

- Sanda character
- Kazushige Sanda and Santa Claus, as illustrated by Paru Itagaki
- First appearance: Sanda chapter 1: "Everything's Bright, Am I Aging?" (2021)
- Created by: Paru Itagaki
- Voiced by: Japanese: Ayumu Murase (Sanda), Hiroki Tōchi (Santa) Mihajlo Bucevac (young); English: Edward A. Mendoza (Sanda), Ben Balmaceda (Santa)

Kazushige Sanda (Japanese: 三田 一重, Hepburn: Sanda Kazushige) is the protagonist of the manga Sanda by Paru Itagaki. Sanda is a 14-years old boy who is descended from the lineage of Santa Claus (サンタ クロース, Santa Kurōsu). Throughout the series, he helps his friends with problems connected to the Christmas tradition.

Sanda is shown to frequently switch between two forms: his Sanda form and his Santa Claus form. He summons his Santa Claus form by wearing red clothing and reverts back to his Sanda form by eating a candy called Bratty Beans. While in his Santa Claus form, he exhibits superhuman traits and strength reminiscent of traditions associated with the legendary Santa Claus, such as fire resistance, the ability to detect lies, and the ability to grow skis on his feet.

For the anime adaptation, studio Science Saru wanted to properly animate Sanda's transformations and actions, which led to Sanda and Santa having different voice actors, Ayumu Murase and Hiroki Tōchi, respectively. For the English dub, Edward A. Mendoza and Ben Balmaceda respectively voiced the two sides of the protagonist.

== Creation ==
Following the ending of her previous work, Beastars, Itagaki sought to draw a human-focused story that was centered around Christmas due to her fondness of the holiday. Itagaki published a one-shot chapter titled White Beard and Boobs, which featured Santa Claus and a sex worker, but received a negative response. In a discussion with her editor at Weekly Manga Goraku, Itagaki expressed her interest in reusing the Santa Claus character in a new series aimed at a younger audience. Because the narrative involved Santa Claus, Itagaki considered the Christmas season an appropriate and enjoyable timeframe for the story. Itagaki set the story in a renovated version of the Isetan Shinjuku department store because she frequently accompanied her parents on shopping trips there. The idea of Santa Claus working with a prostitute would be reused for the final chapters of Sanda where the young protagonist tells his fiance that he had sexual relationships years ago, with Itagaki clarifying this in the final notes of the volume.

Itagaki intended the final Kazushige Sanda to connect children with adults, which is why Sanda sees other characters like Fuyumura as children when he transforms. Itagaki cited the 2010 film The Wolfman as an influence, noting that Benicio del Toro's transformation inspired Sanda's own metamorphosis. Itagaki reflected that while she initially approached the action scenes with seriousness, she later found them humorous. Initially, Sanda fights nearly naked in his Santa Claus persona which bothered the author herself. Itagaki had multiple thoughts about what kind of clothing should Santa Claus wearing, considering military uniforms until deciding on jerseys.

Itagaki has described Sanda as "a boy who believes in kindness, even when the world doesn't". Itagaki wanted to avoid Sanda feeling like a stereotypical protagonist and instead be likable thanks to these traits.

For the animated adaptation, director Tomohisa Shimoyama wanted to explore Sanda's struggle with the notion of "adulthood and childhood" and the characters who manipulate him. He looked forward to the juxtaposition of Sanda's muscular form and childlike traits and how they grow together. Producer Kohei Sakita said that a muscular Santa Claus is not rare in Japanese culture. He was interested in how Itagaki's Santa looks older but has the heart of a child, "which is more like the nature of a human being, and is close to the world we're living in". Shimoyama said the response to Sanda's first transformation differed depending on the region, as Japanese fans found it scary while Westerners laughed.

=== Casting ===
Ayumu Murase voiced Sanda in Japanese. He recalled being surprised by the script's quality during recording, believing it to be as appealing as Beastars. Hiroki Tochi (Santa Claus) saw Sanda's transformation as impressive and how he desires to help other children. Murase says that "while Sanda is a normal 14-year-old, after awakening as Santa Claus, he gradually loses sight of himself. His impulsiveness when he's fighting or absorbed in something really shines through coming across as a mature teenager." He added that he often transforms into Santa Claus after he starts talking, and when he saw the finished video, Tochi's Santa Claus has a strong appearance but still has Sanda's heart and is portrayed as a character in his own right.

Murase still had doubts about how the duality would be portrayed during the recording of the anime but was glad about it when hearing Tochi. Sound director Keiichiro Miyoshi told him to emphasize the boyishness. He had complicated feelings about seeing the character fight. Tochi was told to make this scene more like Sanda rather than Santa Claus, resulting in him trying to emulate Murase's performance.

For the English dub of the anime, Edward A. Mendoza voices Sanda, while Ben Balmaceda is behind his Santa Claus persona. Mendoza was glad for being in charge of Sanda, thanking voice director Alex von David for choosing him for the role. Balmaceda was also glad for having to voice Santa Claus, especially because of his feelings about Christmas.

== Role in Sanda ==
Kasushige Sanda is a middle student at Daikoku Welfare Academy. On a snowy Christmas day, classmate Shiori Fuyumura breaks Kazushige Sanda's body seal, revealing his Santa Claus form. From that day forward, he finds himself transforming into Santa whenever he wears red clothes. Later, Sanda discovers that he can change back by eating jellybeans. As the two are found out by their classmate Hitoshi Amaya, who wants the tradition of Christmas to become widespread again so his family's bakery can thrive, Sanda meets his nemesis: Hifumi Oshibu, the tyrannical headmaster of Daikoku Welfare Academy who constantly monitors the school's students.

Sanda enters a crisis the more he fights, as he believes he is aging rapidly, until he decides to use his newfound strength to protect Ono and Fuyumura from Tetsudome. He also encounters the young student Fumi Namatame, who seeks to kill adults. To prepare to fight against the threats the school has, Sanda trains with Toyo Tetsudome, who teaches him that being an adult requires committing sins. This unlocks a new Black Santa form in Sanda's power, which is superior to the original one. However, Sanda is still against using violence against minors and instead starts training with Amaya, who tests his immortality by repeatedly shooting him in the head. After facing Namatame and making peace with her, Sanda learns of Ono's death and tries to comfort Fuyumura as reminded by the former's last will.

== Reception ==
The concept of Sanda's character was well-received by critics, with Screen Rant finding the Santa Claus concept innovative due to the notorious mix of action and comedy. Kō Aokage of Real Sound called Sanda a unique fantasy hero story that used the premise of a child transforming into Santa Claus to reflect on modern societal issues, such as low birth rates and excessive state control. Ridge Harripersad of CGMagazine initially found the protagonist stereotypical but later considered the characterization appealing, drawing a parallel to Okarun from Dandadan. Comic Book Resources sees Sanda as a hilarious protagonist considering how he tries to analyze Fuyumura's murder attempts as a young girl being actually shy. He sees the two leads similar to Okarun and Momo Ayase due to how ridiculously but darkly Sanda unleashes the awakening of Santa Claus, similar to how the Dandadan leads develop their own superpowers in the first episode and have to deal with them. Area Jugones was surprised by the idea of using Santa Claus as a lead and found the visuals unique.

"Bolts" from Anime News Network praised the handling of the lore and the Santa Claus character but criticized Kazushige's tendency to overanalyze situations and Shiori for occasionally mistreating him despite her reliance on Santa Claus's power. Raquel Ramia of Akihabara Station commended the narrative for its themes of children leaving childhood behind, which resulted in significant character development for the main cast. She speculated about the potential for a love triangle despite its absence in early chapters and praised the artwork for its fight scenes and detailed character expressions during dramatic moments. Anime Feminist found Sanda's characterization complex due to his desire to protect children and found that he is often the focus of fanservice due to Santa Claus being shown half-naked but having a notably built body. Comic Book Resources was pleased with Sanda's characterization in the second episode due to his strong sense of justice that allows him to take responsibility for the children who appear to oppose him only to face the real antagonistic character, Ooshibu. This made the writer find Sanda compelling, as not only does he face Ooshibu but also forms a friendship with Amaya. UK Anime Network considered the character a classic take on the "kid becomes a superhero" trope.

Lucas DeRuyter from Anime News Network enjoyed the "ridiculous" premise and found Sanda's powers compelling. The animation by Science Saru was praised for a scene where the protagonist uses his powers against an explosion. DeRuyter, who watched the English dub, commended Ben Balmaceda for his energetic portrayal of Santa Claus. Chris Beveridge of The Fandom Post found the initial conflict between Fuyumura and Sanda intriguing. He considered the story over-the-top but felt the duality of Sanda and Santa Claus was effective.

In "Sanda Shows that Adolescence is Supposed to be Awkward", Lucas DeRuyter from Anime News Network says that the protagonist endures the series's core theme of accepting adulthood in the form of obtaining new powers in his powers awakened by his genes. He also stands out for being sympathetic to the cold Fuyumura in her identity crisis that the society does not want seen in the children. As the narrative progresses, Sanda looks to find more people troubled by social issues the adults do not want to see and help them improve while also improving his relationship with Fuyumura.

In "The Strongest Anime Character of 2025 Isn't Who Solo Leveling Fans Think", Vanessa Piña from Screen Rant said Sanda ended up becoming the strongest anime character from 2025, surpassing the famous Sung Jin-woo from Solo Leveling due to their notable increase of powers across their respective series while drawing comparisons with Wolverine from the Marvel Comics, as the latter showed similar invulnerability powers in order to wield weapons similar to Sanda's healing powers as Santa Claus. Additionally, Sanda was compared with the "Trust Value" system in To Be Hero X due to the value the character obtains when being supported by children. As a result, Piña said that Sanda stands out as one of the most overpowered characters anime can feature but without ruining the original likable traits his original child persona possesses, something he believes Sung Jinwoo suffered. Sanda's portrayal as a protector of the innocent who suffer notable issues with their lives was also praised by the same website for portraying the Christmas story in a different fashion from others that rely on action like Die Hard, Miracle on 34th Street or It's a Wonderful Life is.
