= Kashiwa Campus, University of Tokyo =

The Kashiwa Campus, University of Tokyo (Japanese: 東京大学 柏地区キャンパス; branded as UTokyo Kashiwa) is one of the three main campuses of the University of Tokyo located in Kashiwa, Chiba. It is also referred to as the "Kashiwa Campus" or simply "Kashiwa District". It consists of three subareas divided by parks and roads: Kashiwa, Kashiwa II, and Kashiwanoha Station Front.

== Overview ==
Until the 1990s, the University of Tokyo operated campuses dispersed across various locations such as Nakano, Shirokanedai, and Mitaka (later spun off from the university as the National Astronomical Observatory of Japan), as well as Roppongi (Institute for Solid State Physics, Institute of Industrial Science) and Tanashi (Institute for Nuclear Study, Institute for Cosmic Ray Research), in addition to the central Tokyo main campuses of Hongo and Komaba. These smaller campuses were acquired at different stages throughout the university's history. It was often pointed out that having smaller campuses spread across Tokyo caused various inconveniences. Hence, it was decided to purchase a hundred acres of suburban land near the newly opened Tsukuba Express line to concentrate institutes and departments that need large research facilities. UTokyo Kashiwa was established based on the tri-polar structure concept (三極構造構想), which was formulated in conjunction with the redevelopment of the Hongo and Komaba campuses, which had become too small for new buildings needed to keep up with the latest developments in science and technology.

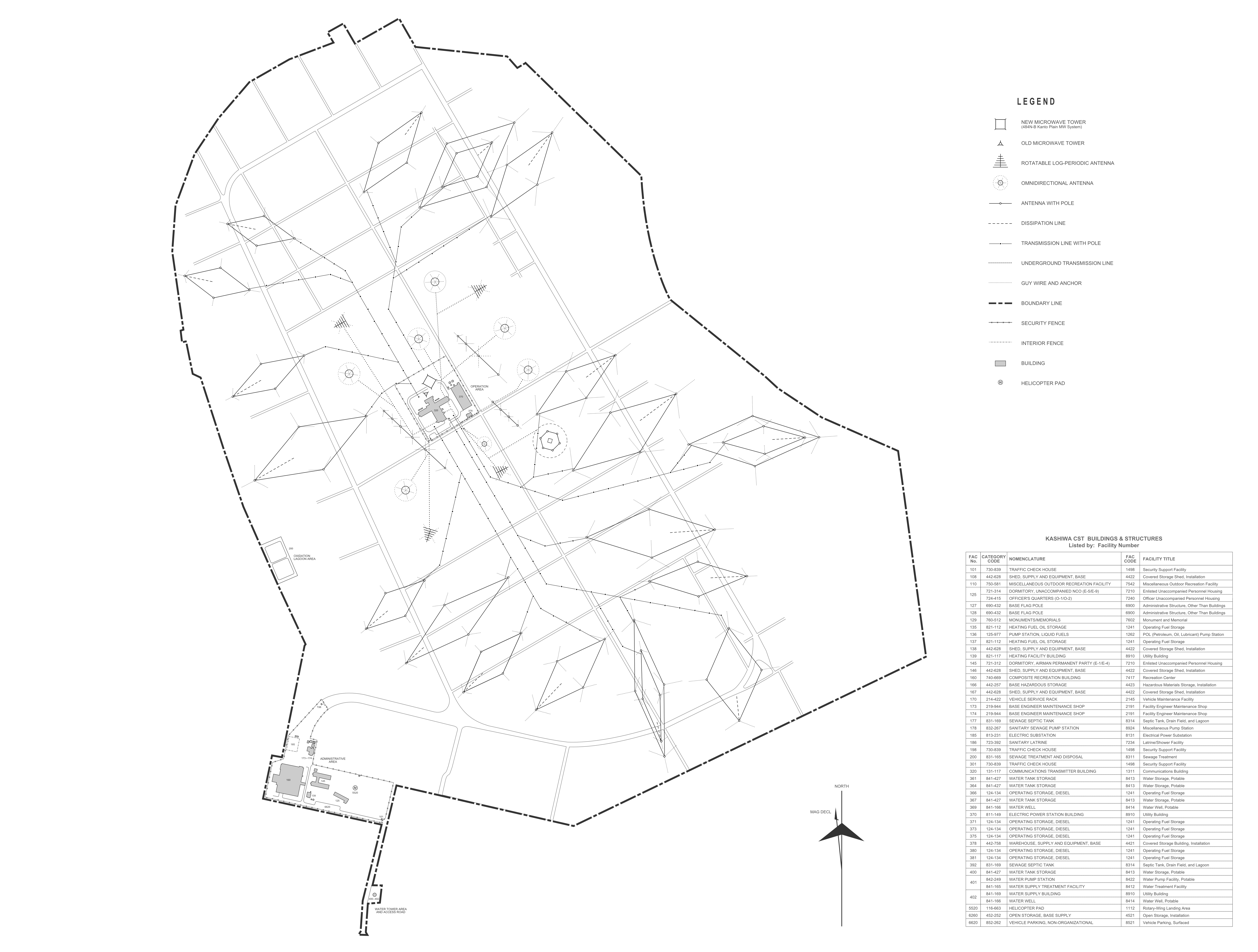
USAF Kashiwa Communications Station in 1966

From 1945 to 1979, the site of the campus was occupied by the Kashiwa Communications Station of the United States Air Force (Camp Tomlinson). After the closure of the station, the site remained unoccupied until the university purchased it in 1995 and 1998.

As of May 2023, 1,969 postgraduate students, 819 faculty members and researchers and 831 other members of staff were based at UTokyo Kashiwa. Very few undergraduates are based at UTokyo Kashiwa, as it is dedicated to advanced research and postgraduate education. UTokyo Kashiwa also has international dormitories, reflecting its high concentration of international students.

== Faculties and institutes ==
UTokyo Kashiwa has the following faculties and institutes: Faculties and Departments:

- Some departments from the School of Science
- Some departments from the School of Engineering
- Some departments from the Department of New Interdisciplinary Science, Graduate School of Frontier Sciences

Affiliated Institutes:

- Kavli Institute for the Physics and Mathematics of the Universe
- Institute for Cosmic Ray Research
- Institute for Solid State Physics
- Institute of Atmospheric and Oceanic Research
- Chiba Experimental Station, Institute of Industrial Science
- Centre for Artificial Intelligence Research
- Centre for Spatial Information Science
- Environmental Safety Research Centre (Kashiwa Branch)
- Health Centre (Kashiwa Branch)
- Kashiwa Library
- Kashiwa Area Administration Office

== Access ==
- 13 minutes by University Commuter Bus from Kashiwanoha-campus Station (TX13) on the Tsukuba Express
- 30 minutes by walk from Edogawadai Station (TD20) on the Tobu Noda line
- 1 hour 15 minutes by the Gorokuro Liner (shuttle bus service between the main Hongo Campus and the Kashiwa Campus)

== Neighbourhood ==
- Kashiwanoha Park
- National Cancer Center Japan, Hospital East
- Kashiwanoha Campus, Chiba University
- Rugby School Japan
- LaLaport KASHIWANOHA (ららぽーと柏の葉)

== Gallery ==
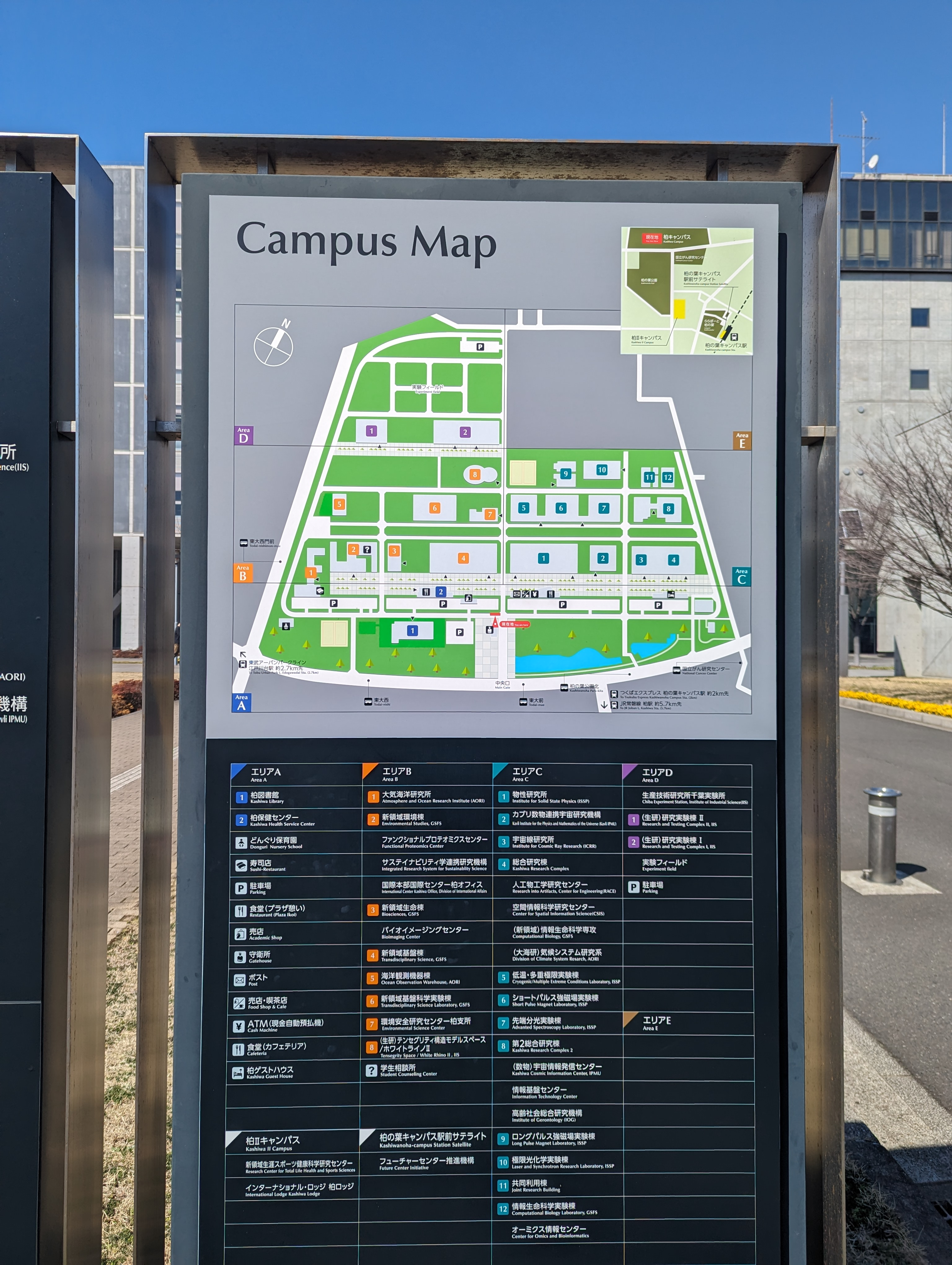
Map of the campus

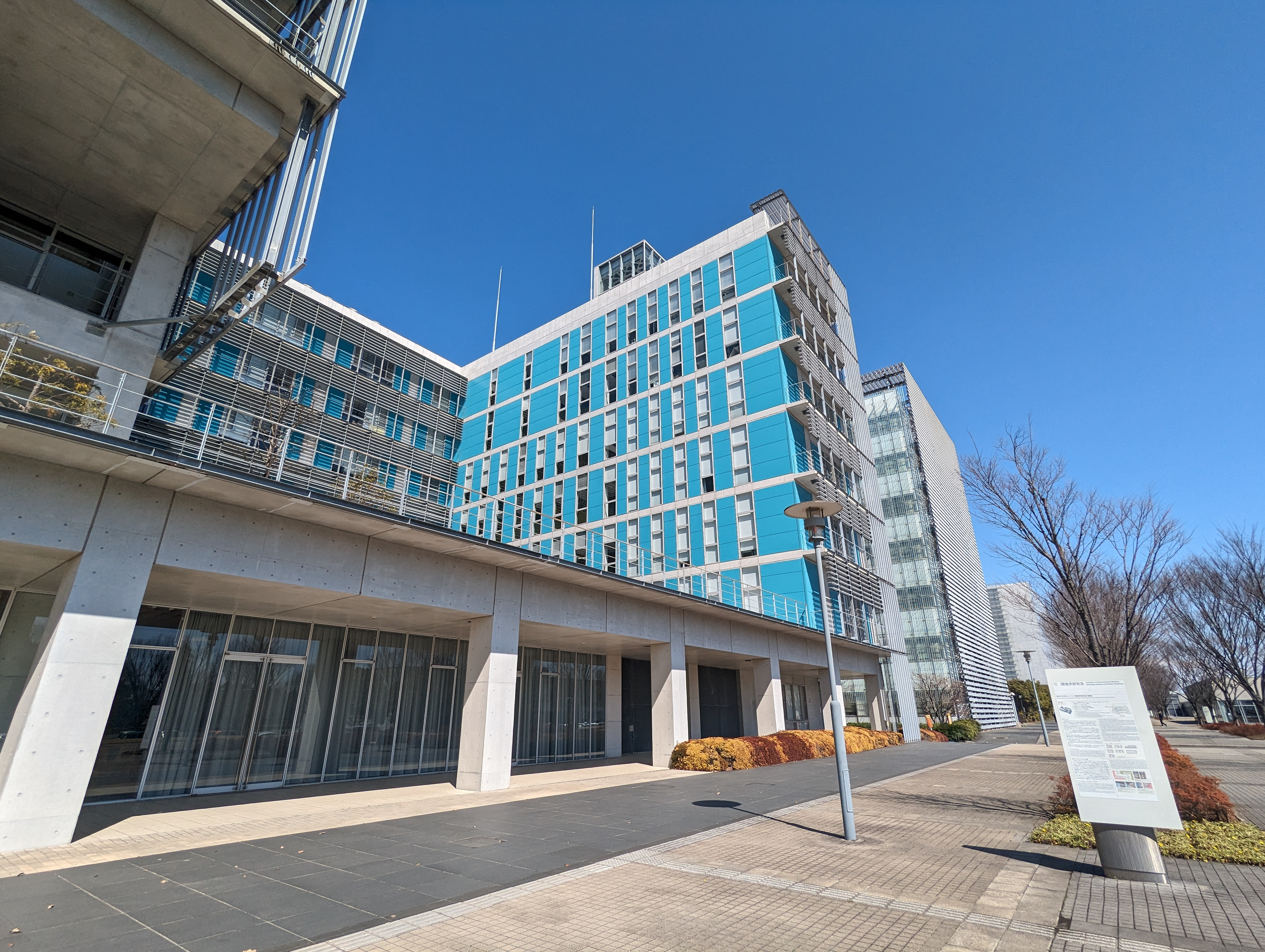
Building of the Graduate School of Frontier Sciences

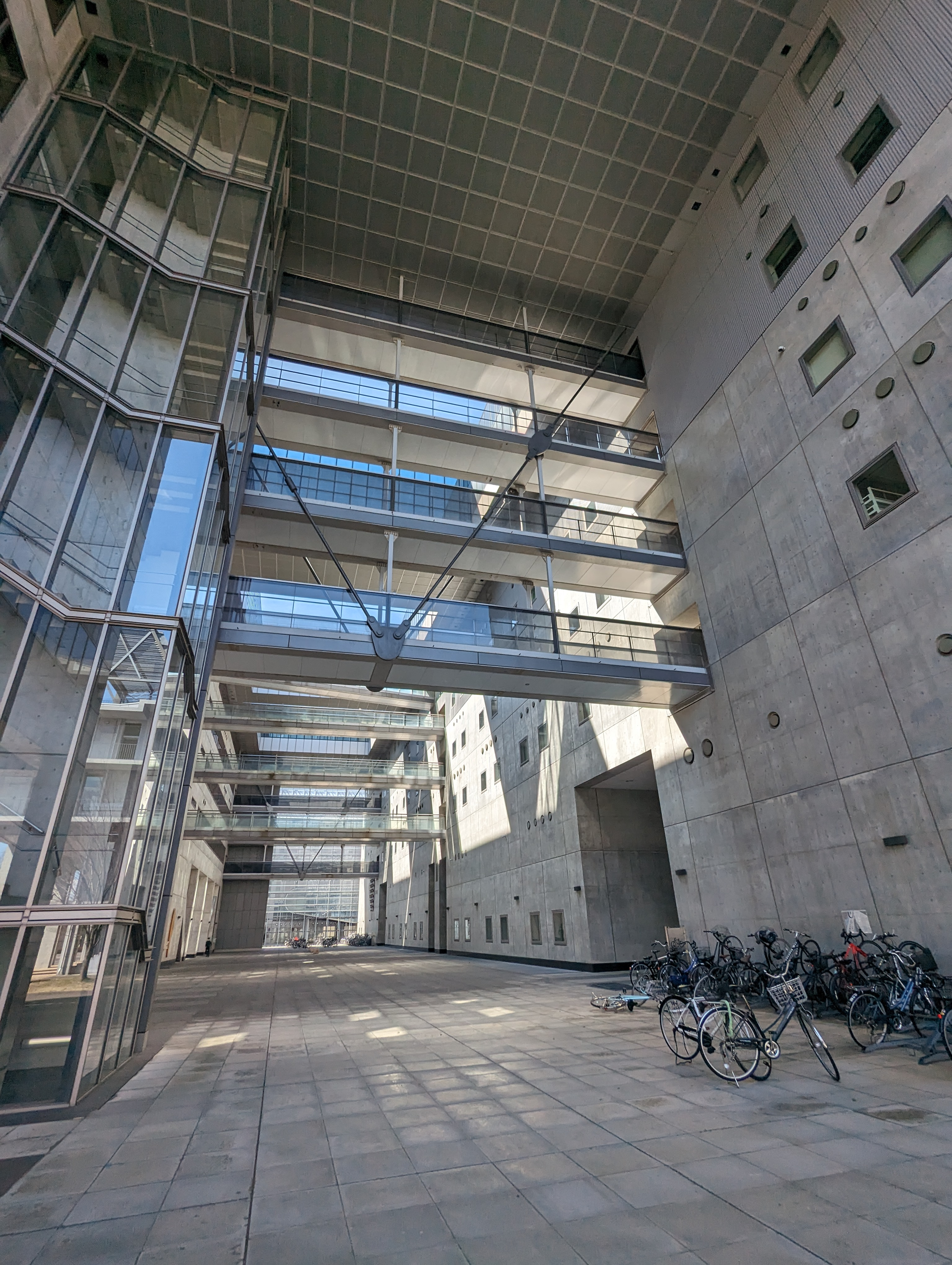
Outdoor atrium of the Institute for Cosmic Ray Research

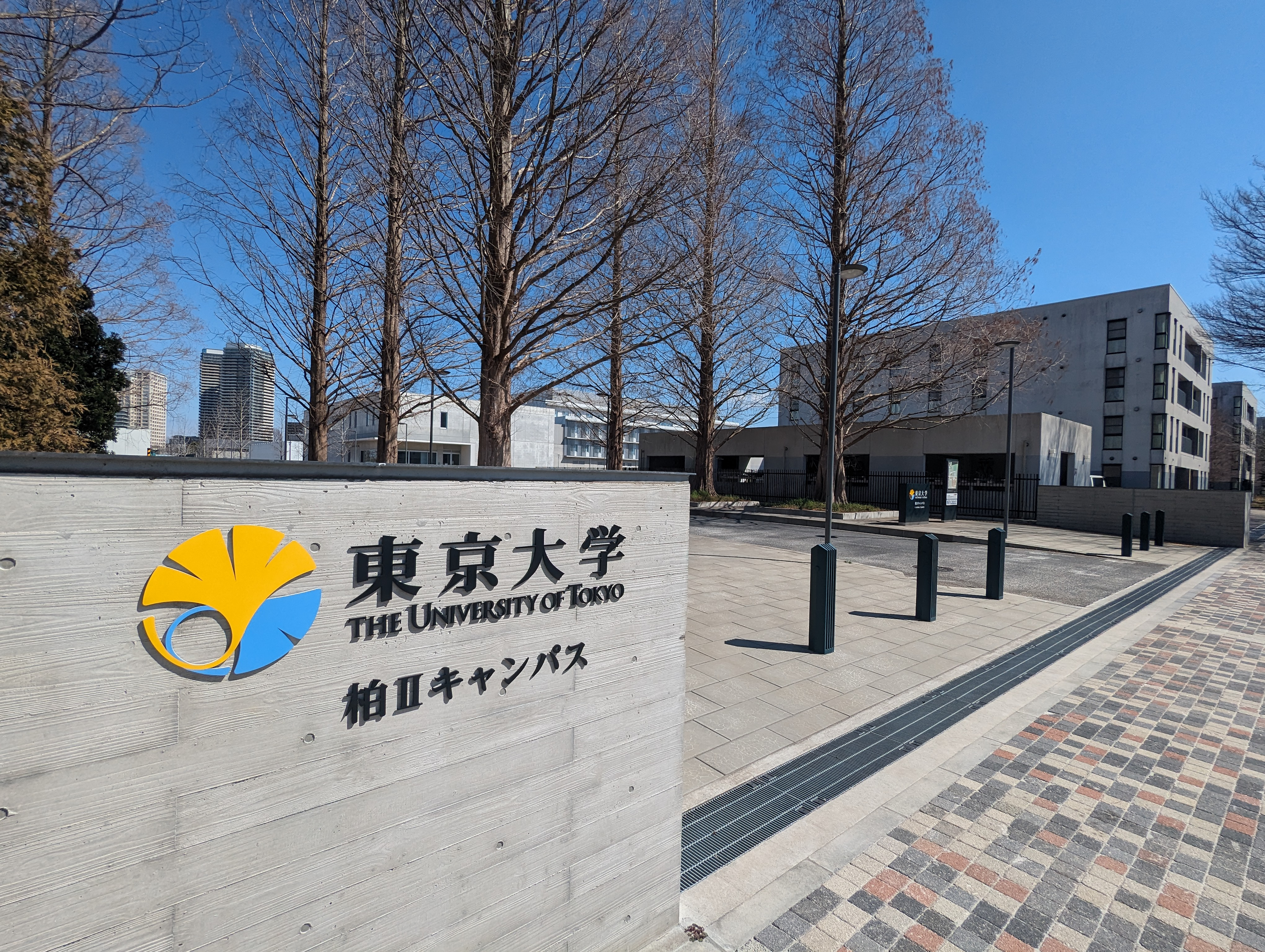
Front gate of the Kashiwa II Campus

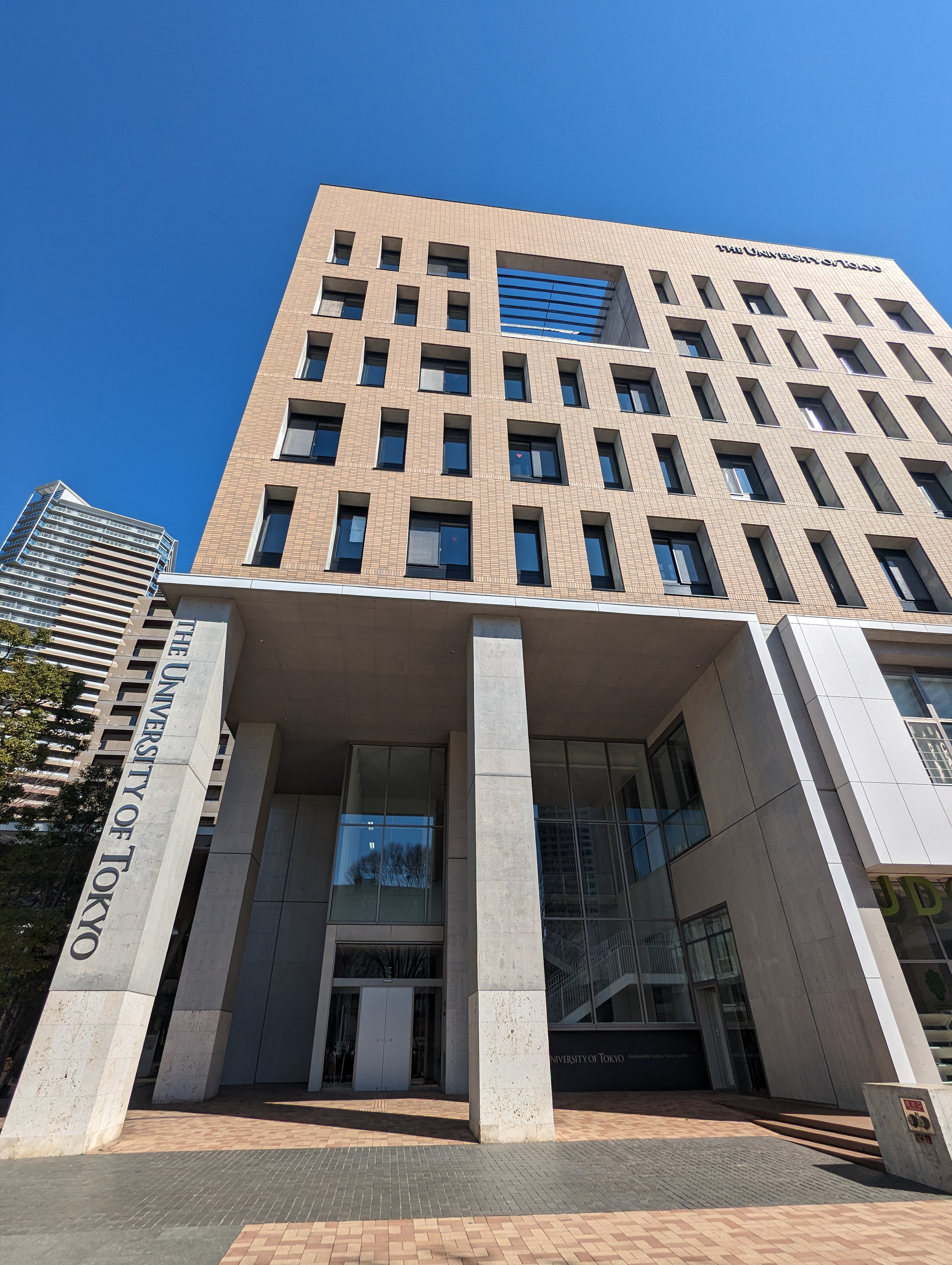
Station Satellite

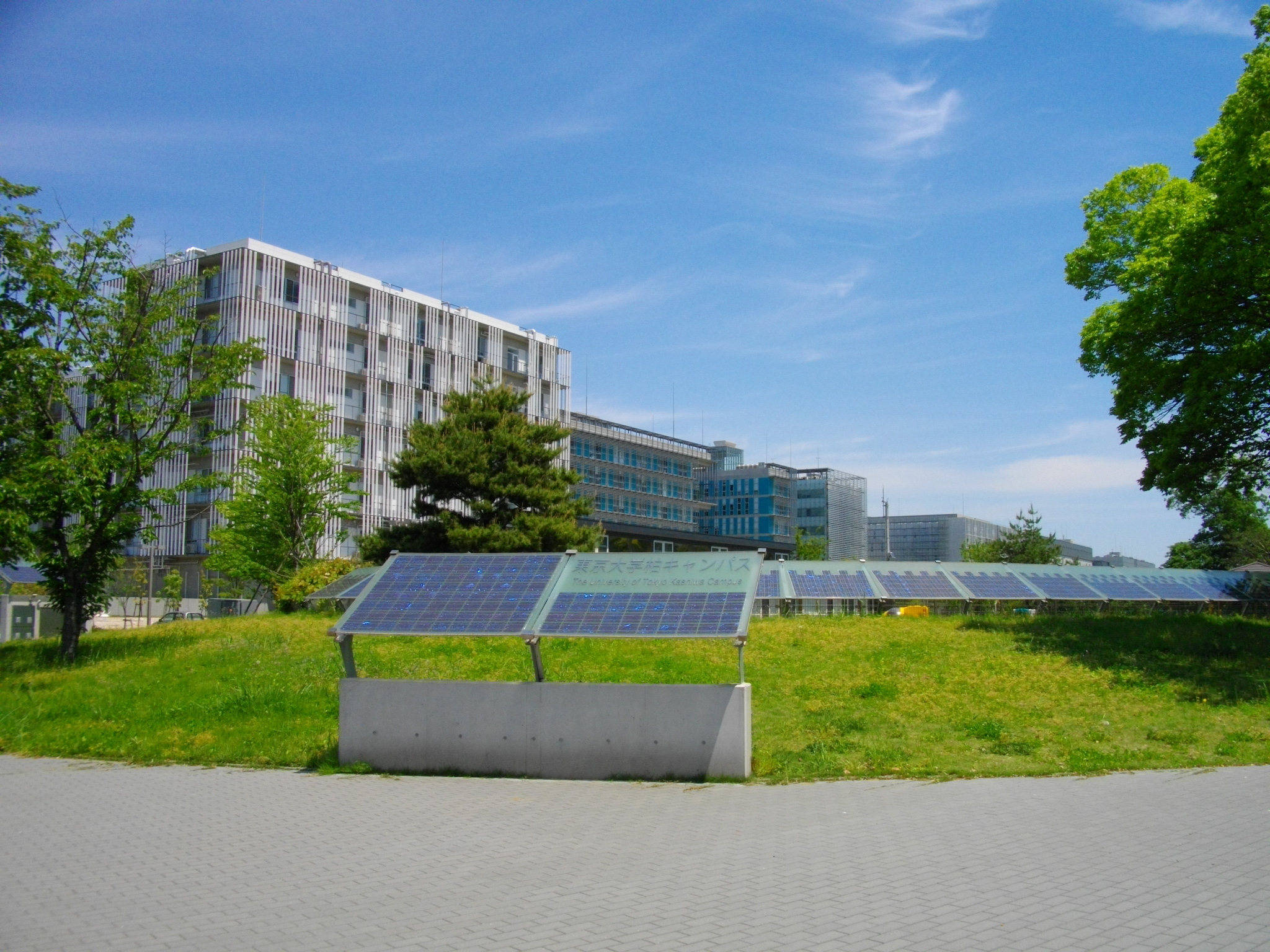
Engineering buildings

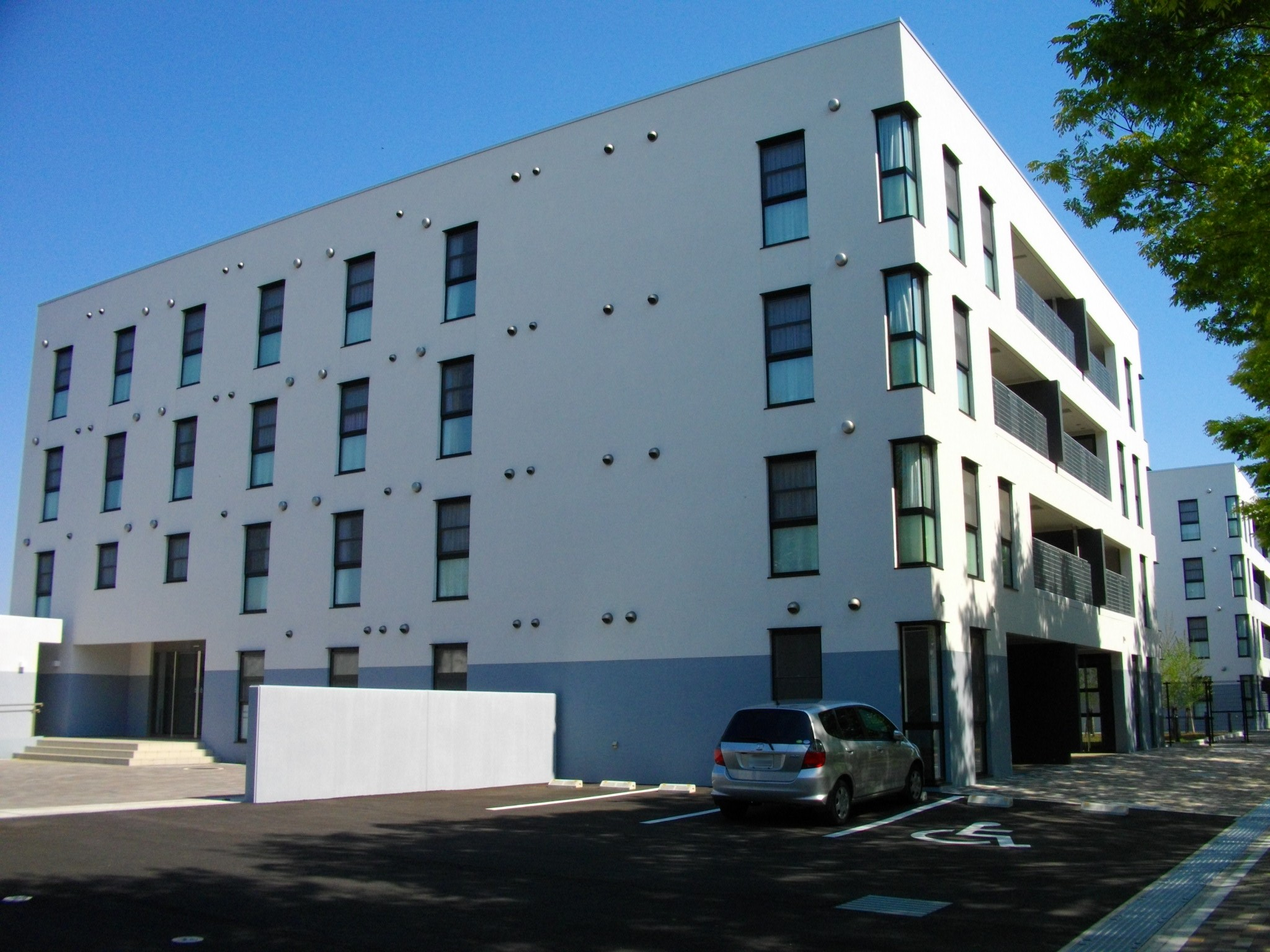
International dormitory for students

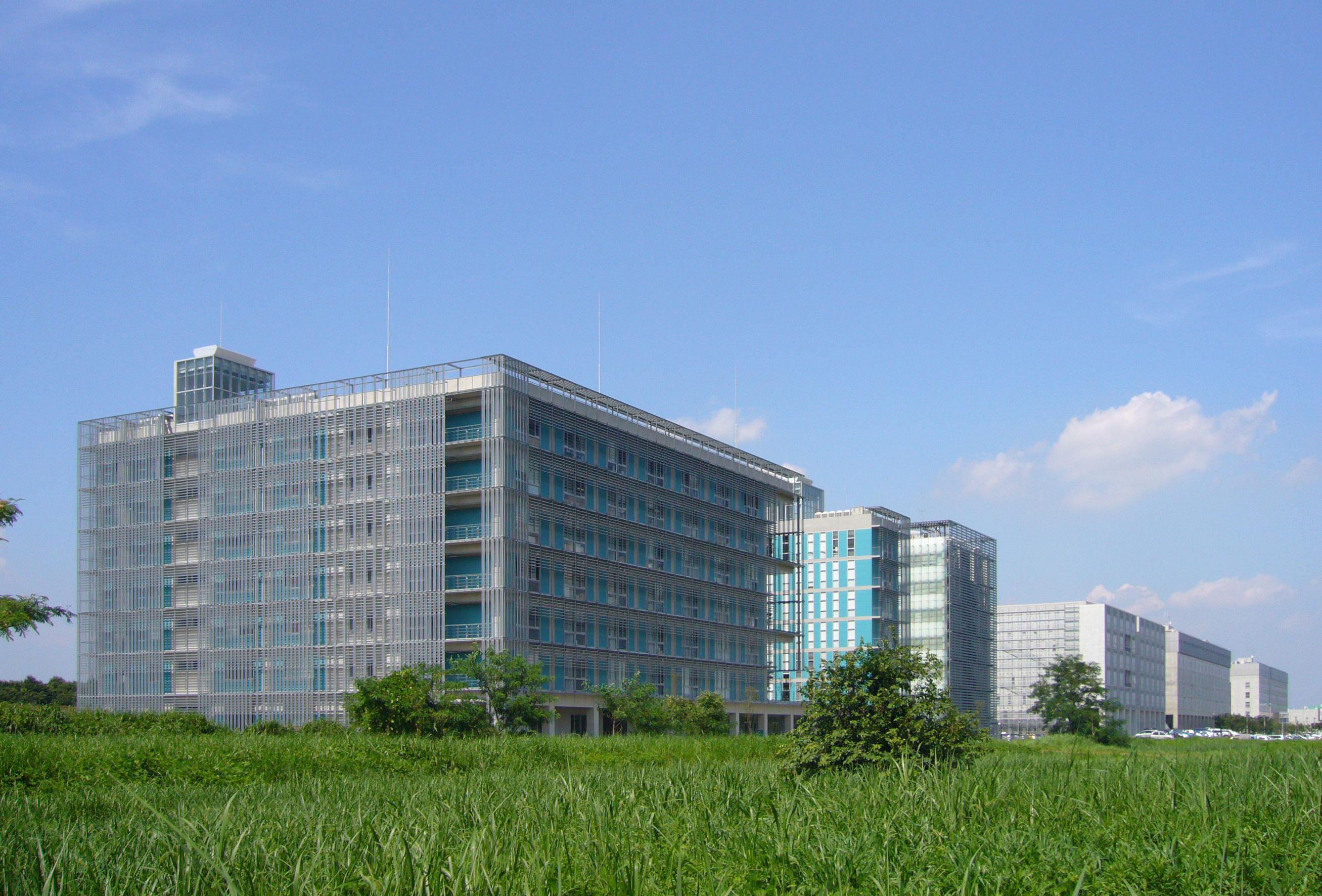
Engineering buildings

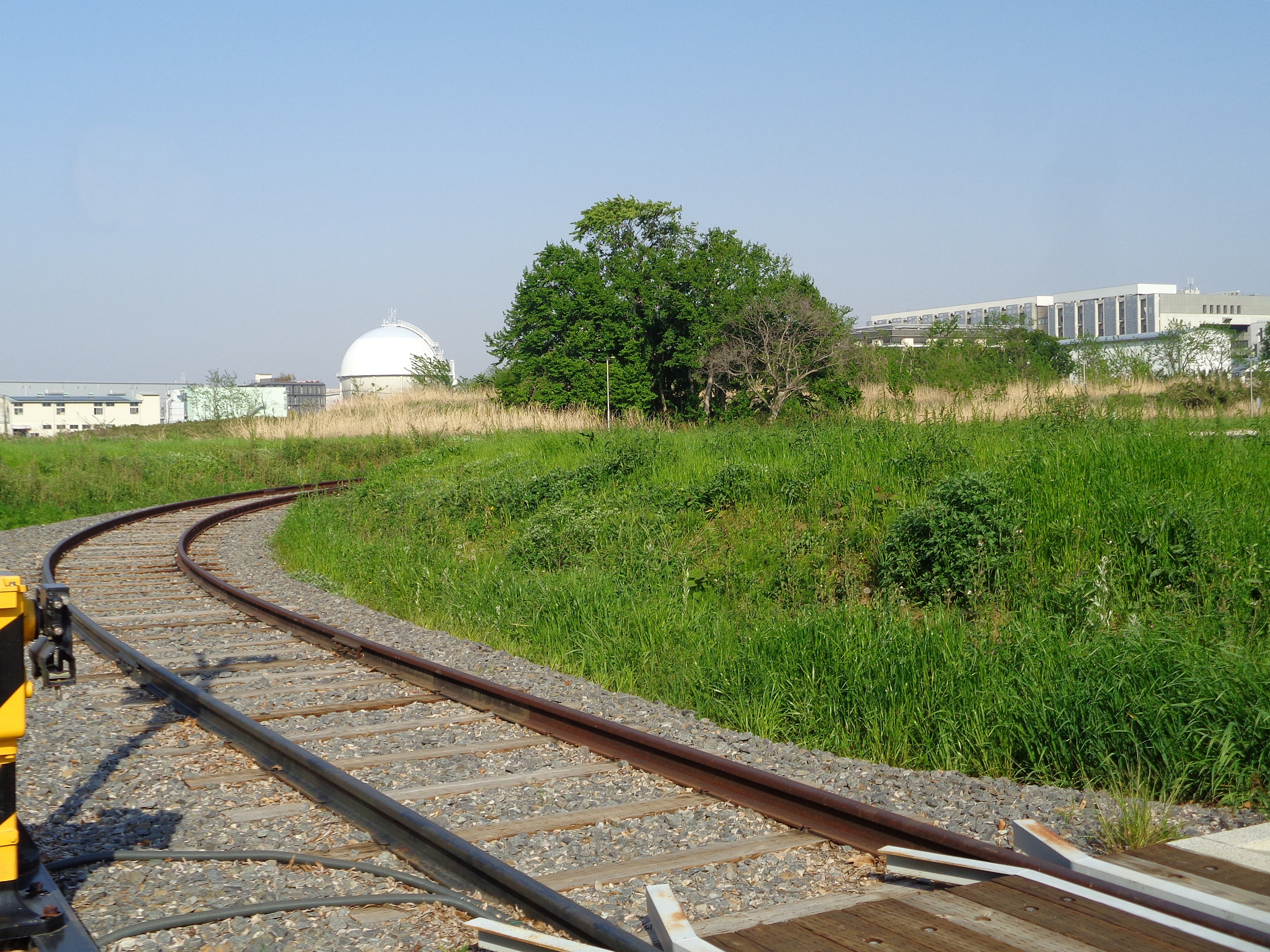
Test railway track

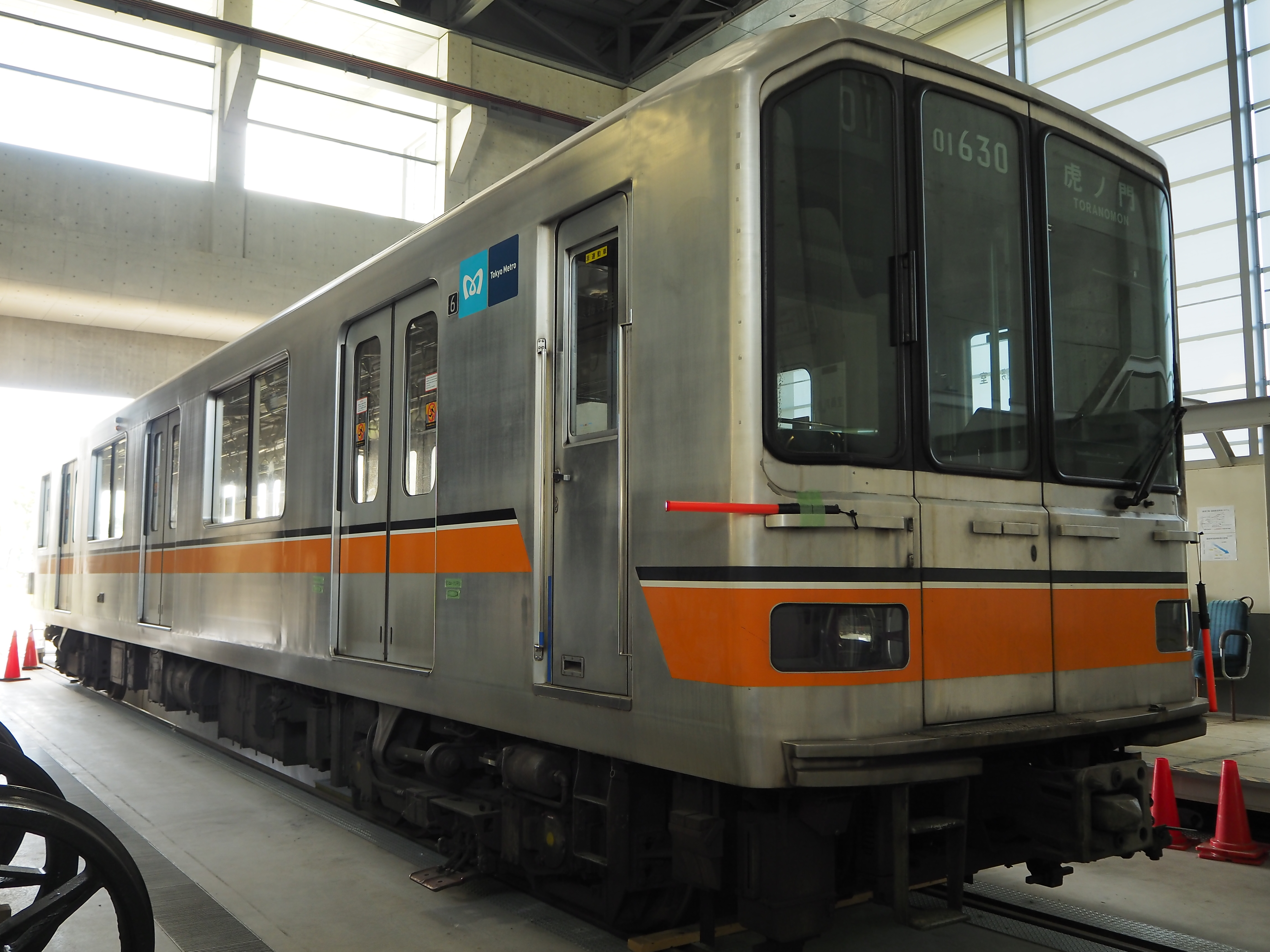
Former Tokyo Metro series 01 train used as a railway technology testbed
