= Sanda (manga) =

Japanese manga series

- First tankōbon volume cover, featuring Kazushige Sanda as Santa Claus
- Genre: Adventure; Mystery
- Manga
- Written by: Paru Itagaki
- Published by: Akita Shoten
- English publisher: NA: Titan Comics
- Imprint: Shōnen Champion Comics
- Magazine: Weekly Shōnen Champion
- Original run: July 21, 2021 – July 11, 2024
- Volumes: 16
- Anime television series
- Directed by: Tomohisa Shimoyama
- Written by: Kimiko Ueno
- Music by: Tomoyuki Tanaka
- Studio: Science Saru
- Licensed by: Amazon Prime Video
- Original network: MBS, TBS, CBC, BS-TBS (Animeism)
- Original run: October 4, 2025 – December 20, 2025
- Episodes: 12
- icon

Sanda (stylized in all caps) is a Japanese manga series written and illustrated by Paru Itagaki. It was serialized in Akita Shoten's shōnen manga magazine Weekly Shōnen Champion from July 2021 to July 2024, with its chapters collected in 16 tankōbon volumes.

The story takes place in the future Japan, where the birth rate in the country has been rapidly declining. Kazushige Sanda is found to be the descendant of Santa Claus by his classmate, Shiori Fuyumura. Together, they attempt to find Fuyumura's missing classmate, Ichie Ono. Itagaki created the series based on her idea to write human characters, as her previous work, Beastars, primarily focused on animals. She was also interested in the figure of Santa Claus.

An anime television series adaptation produced by Science Saru aired from October to December 2025.

The manga has been well received by critics for its premise and themes involving the cast. The anime adaptation received similar attention, with praise focused on Science Saru's animation, fight scenes, and visuals.

== Synopsis ==
=== Setting ===
The story is set in Japan in 2080. Affected by the declining birth rate, Japan has implemented a series of control policies for minors, including arranging marriage partners from infancy, not allowing children to sleep to slow down development, and needing to use the toilet separately from adults. Young people's social status is also higher than adults. Santa Claus has been sealed for a long time because of the curse, which makes the society think that Santa Claus has disappeared, and regard Christmas as an ancient custom or fictional legend.

=== Plot ===
On December 25, when it was snowing, middle school student Kazushige Sanda's body seal was broken by his classmate Shiori Fuyumura, making him look like Santa Claus. From that day forward he finds himself transforming into Santa whenever he wears red clothes. Later, Sanda discovers that he can change back by eating jellybeans. The reason why Fuyumura lifted the seal was that she hoped that Sanda would help find her missing classmate Ichie Ono, and also hoped that he would remind the society of Christmas.

== Characters ==
=== Main ===
Kazushige Sanda (三田 一重, Sanda Kazushige)
Voiced by: Ayumu Murase (Japanese); Edward A. Mendoza (English)
An extroverted and short middle school boy who is descended from the lineage of Santa Claus. He is driven by compassion to help his friends in their problems connected to the Christmas tradition, though he becomes conflicted with balancing both his adolescent life and being Santa. He is able to revert back to his Sanda form upon eating a candy called Bratty Beans.
Santa Claus (サンタ クロース, Santa Kurōsu)
Voiced by: Hiroki Tōchi (Japanese); Ben Balmaceda (English)
Sanda's secondary identity, who is able to be summoned when he wears any red clothing, including bloodstained clothes. He exhibits superhuman traits and strength reminiscent of traditions associated with the legendary Santa Claus, such as fire resistance, the ability to detect lies, and the ability to grow skis on his feet. He also has an alternate form called "Black Santa", which he can use to punish naughty people.
Shiori Fuyumura (冬村 四織, Fuyumura Shiori)
Voiced by: Umeka Shōji (Japanese); Morgan Berry (English)
A tall, lanky and withdrawn middle school girl who looks like an adult woman. She is aware of Santa Claus' existence, and is willing to commit dangerous acts in order to find Ono, with the help of Sanda's dual identity. She struggles in reconciling her identity after experiencing a growth spurt when she was young.

=== Others ===
Ichie Ono (小野 一会, Ono Ichie)
Voiced by: Anna Nagase (Japanese); Abby Trott (English)
Fuyumura's closest friend who still believes in Christmas and suddenly disappeared. It is later revealed she went into seclusion after she suddenly reached puberty after falling asleep, knowing that Oshibu would target her. It is also revealed she harbors romantic feelings towards Fuyumura.
Hitoshi Amaya (甘矢 一詩, Amaya Hitoshi)
Voiced by: Yuuki Shin (Japanese); Jonathan Leon (English)
Sanda's best friend who dreams of the tradition of Christmas to become widespread again in order for his family bakery to thrive.
Niko Kazao (風尾 二胡, Kazao Niko)
Voiced by: Misato Matsuoka (Japanese); Brittany Lauda (English)
An abrasive and thrill-seeking student who is Sanda's fiancée as arranged by the state.
Fumi Namatame (生田目 二海, Namatame Fumi)
Voiced by: Mariya Ise (Japanese); Suzie Yeung (English)
A student who is part of a class of middle schoolers who, in an attempt to rebel against their teachers, killed adults.
Hifumi Oshibu (大渋 一二三, Ōshibu Hifumi)
Voiced by: Toshihiko Seki (Japanese); Lucien Dodge (English)
The tyrannical cyborg headmaster of Daikoku Welfare Academy, who constantly monitors the school's students. He is 92 years old, though he keeps his face with a youthful appearance through a heart implant and other procedures. He has an obsession with youth and his trauma-free principles, and will go to great lengths to punish those who do not conform with his ideals.
Saburo Yagiuda (柳生田 三郎, Yagiuda Saburō)
Voiced by: Hiroaki Hirata, Mutsuki Iwanaka (young) (Japanese); Kirk Thornton, Seth Fuentes (young) (English)
The middle-aged leader of the St. Nick Pursuit Unit, an elite task force assigned to capture Santa Claus. He has a personal grudge against Santa, having fought him several years earlier. Despite his animosity towards Santa and discovering he is Sanda's secondary identity, he makes efforts to keep Sanda alive to prevent himself from being executed by Oshibu.
Toyo Tetsudome (鉄留十予, Tetsudome Toyo)
Voiced by: Masako Nozawa, Toa Yukinari (young) (Japanese); Barbara Goodson, Allegra Clark (young) (English)
The aging chief director of Daikoku Welfare Academy, who accepts growing old in contrast to Oshibu wanting to maintain eternal youth. She also showcases strength when she needs to intervene.

== Production ==
Following her work on Beastars, which featured an animal cast, author Paru Itagaki sought to create a different kind of story. She cited the 2010 film The Wolfman as an influence, noting that Benicio del Toro's transformation inspired the character Sanda's own metamorphosis. Itagaki reflected that while she initially approached the action scenes with seriousness, she later found them humorous. The author also held a particular attachment to the Isetan Shinjuku department store, having frequently accompanied her parents on shopping trips there. This connection led to her desire to use Isetan as a setting, resulting in the story's school being a renovated version of the store. With the narrative involving Santa Claus, Itagaki also considered the Christmas season an appropriate and enjoyable timeframe for the story. Itagaki had wanted to draw a manga with human characters for a long time, but she did not commit to the idea until her late twenties. She described her thirties as a period of adulthood where she contemplated the transition from childhood, which inspired the creation of Sanda.

Prior to Sanda, Itagaki published a one-shot chapter titled White Beard and Boobs (白ヒゲとボイン, Shirohige to Boin) in Nihon Bungeisha's seinen magazine Weekly Manga Goraku on September 7, 2018. The one-shot featured Santa Claus and a sex worker. Itagaki later discussed with her editor at Weekly Manga Goraku her interest in reusing the Santa Claus character in a new series aimed at a younger audience. Her editor agreed, on the condition that she first create a one-volume manga for the publisher, which resulted in Drip Drip (ボタボタ, Bota Bota). Its collected volume was released in April 2021, and Sanda began serialization three months later in Akita Shoten's shōnen magazine Weekly Shōnen Champion on July 21.

For the anime adaptation by Science Saru, director Tomohisa Shimoyama cited animator Yoshinori Kanada as a major inspiration for his work and expressed a fascination with Itagaki's artistic style.

== Media ==
=== Manga ===
Written and illustrated by Paru Itagaki, Sanda was serialized in Akita Shoten's shōnen manga magazine Weekly Shōnen Champion from July 21, 2021, to July 11, 2024. Akita Shoten has collected its chapters into individual tankōbon volumes, with 16 volumes released from December 8, 2021, to October 8, 2024.

In February 2025, Titan Comics announced that it had licensed the series for English publication, with the first volume released on September 2, 2025.

==== Volumes ====
No.	Original release date	Original ISBN	English release date	English ISBN
1	December 8, 2021	978-4-253-28101-0	September 2, 2025	978-1-787-74724-1
1. "Everything's Bright, Am I Aging?" (全てが眩しい これが老いか, Subete ga Mabushii, Kore ga Oi ka); 2. "These Flammable Two" (この2人 火気奨励, Kono Futari Kaki Shōrei); 3. "Candy, Whip, Kiss, Blade" (飴と鞭とキスと刃と, Ame to Muchi to Kisu to Ha to); 4. "Sorcerer of Trauma" (トラウマの魔人, Torauma no Majin); 5. "Cake Shop Vow" (ケーキ屋の前で誓い立てた, Kēkiya no Mae de Chikai Tateta); 6. "Falling Banter" (落下のからかい, Rakka no Karakai); 7. "Sleeting Concrete" (みぞれ降るコンクリート, Mizore Furu Konkurīto)
2	February 8, 2022	978-4-253-28102-7	November 18, 2025	978-1-787-74725-8
8. "Flamed Fruit Sweetens" (果物燃えれば甘くなる, Kudamono Moereba Amaku Naru); 9. "Admiration With a Dash of Nicotine" (それはニコチン混じりの感嘆, Sore wa Nikochin Majiri no Kantan); 10. "Don't Fear a Millionth Growth Spurt" (第二億次成長期を怖がらないで, Daini Oku-ji Seichōki o Kowagaranaide); 11. "Textbook Crushing Zeus" (教科書突き破りしゼウス, Kyōkasho Tsukiyaburishi Zeusu); 12. "Still Don't Know How to Console a Child" (子どもの撫で方はまだ知らない, Kodomo no Nadekata wa Mada Shiranai); 13. "Typhoon Inside a Snow Globe" (スノードームの中の台風, Sunōdōmu no Naka no Taifū); 14. "My Emergency Airbag Inflates" (僕の非常用エアバッグ作動, Boku no Hijōyō Eabaggu Sadō); 15. "Nameless Wildflower Child" (名もなき野草の子, Na mo Naki Yasō no Ko); 16. "Raging Cells in the Night" (細胞 暴れし夜, Saibō Abareshi Yoru)
3	May 6, 2022	978-4-253-28103-4	May 19, 2026	978-1-787-74726-5
17. "From the Pile of Sweaty Red Tracksuits" (汗臭い赤ジャージの山から, Asekusai Aka Jāji no Yama Kara); 18. "Man-Made Man vs. Santa Claus" (人造人間vsサンタクロース, Jinzō Ningen vs. Santa Kurōsu); 19. "Truth Appears Behind the Eyelid" (真実は瞼の裏に現れる, Shinjitsu wa Mabuta no Ura ni Arawareru); 20. "Supernatural Kick" (超自然的パワーキック, Chō Shizenteki Pawākikku); 21. "Infant Born from Time" (時間から生まれた赤ん坊, Jikan Kara Umareta Akanbō); 22. "The Day He Noticed His Pal's Talent" (友達の才能に気付いてしまった日, Tomodachi no Sainō ni Kidzuite Shimatta Hi); 23. "Carnivorous Plants Growing in the Dark" (陰日向の食虫植物, Kagehinata no Shokuchūshokubutsu); 24. "Can They Cut a Cake?" (彼らにケーキは切れますか?, Karera ni Kēki wa Kiremasu ka?); 25. "The Barefoot Children" (靴を脱いだ子どもたちは, Kutsu o Nuida Kodomo-tachi wa)
4	July 7, 2022	978-4-253-28104-1	December 15, 2026	978-1-787-74727-2
26. Kyūkyoku no Wagamama wa Ren'ai to Īmashite (究極のわがままは恋愛といいまして); 27. Hige ga Haete Inai Hoho Naraba (髭が生えていない頬ならば); 28. Shitsunai no Doro Asobi wa Yogoremasu (室内の泥遊びは汚れます); 29. Kuro Sūtsu no Otona ni Chūi (黒スーツの大人に注意); 30. Zōka Nanoni ne Kusare (造花なのに根腐れ); 31. Ao no Kanshaku Sora o Kiri (青の癇癪 空を切り); 32. Pinku no Tsume ga Hoshī (ピンクの爪が欲しい); 33. Senchimentaru Sansetto (センチメンタル・サンセット); 34. Otona no Kaidan ga Kowaresō (オトナの階段が壊れそう)
5	September 8, 2022	978-4-253-28105-8	—	—
35. Komori Uta ni Biburāto Kikaseru Yō ni (子守唄にビブラートきかせるように); 36. Nagai Isshun no Yōna Kimi (長い一瞬のような君); 37. Sōmatō no Shinkō (走馬灯の侵攻); 38. Sokudo Seigen o Koete mo (速度制限を超えても); 39. Dai Futari wa Sanshō: Santa wa Hi ni Tsuyoi (第2話参照:サンタは火に強い); 40. Kyōmen o Waru Jibun ga Fuete Iku (鏡面を割る。自分が増えていく。); 41. Ore Hairu (オレハイル); 42. Futari no Kōyasai (2人の後夜祭); 43. Pēru Burū no Tobari (ペールブルーの帳)
6	December 8, 2022	978-4-253-28106-5	—	—
44. Ano Ko ni Rubī no Hōseki Ageyo (あの子にルビーの宝石あげよ); 45. Panchi wa Kanmiryō no Aji (パンチは甘味料の味); 46. Atsui Akushu o Kawashimashou (熱い握手を交わしましょう); 47. Sono Zekken Shinzō no Ichi ni Ari (そのゼッケン心臓の位置にあり); 48. Kimi no Atama ni Tsuno Hayashitai (君の頭にツノ生やしたい); 49. Hakushi ni Modoseru no wa Kimidake (白紙に戻せるのは君だけ); 50. Semai Machiaishitsu Desu ga, Go Yukkuri (せまい待合室ですが、ごゆっくり); 51. Musū no Oyashirazu wa Dare Shirazu (無数の親知らずは誰知らず); 52. Nesoberu Kare o Omoidashite (寝そべる彼を思い出して)
7	February 8, 2023	978-4-253-28107-2	—	—
53. Shikkoku no Jinja (漆黒の神社); 54. Makotoni Samuzamushī Otoko (まことに寒々しい男); 55. Hokkyokusei Nogotoki Shimi ga Hoshī (北極星のごときシミがほしい); 56. Atariichimen Pachinko-ya no Kusai (辺り一面パチンコ屋の臭い); 57. Marukawa Mitsuo Sanjūgo-sai (丸川三男35歳); 58. Nukui Yuki wa Tokenai (温い雪はとけない); 59. Chanto Itandesu ne (ちゃんといたんですね); 60. Mizaikin wa Anata no Kokoro Desu (身代金はあなたの心です); 61. Furo Agari no te ni Furenai (風呂上がりの手に触れない)
8	April 7, 2023	978-4-253-28108-9	—	—
62. Urite Ichiba no On Dōzo (売り手市場の恩どうぞ); 63. Heiwa no Tori, Me ga Chibashiri (平和の鳥、目が血走り); 64. Jihanki Yo Teiden Shite Kure (自販機よ停電してくれ); 65. Me mo Sameru Yōna Kafein (目も覚めるようなカフェイン); 66. Hakuchū Dōdō, Shin'ya Tokkyū (白昼堂々、深夜特急); 67. Werukamu to Tōkyō-eki (ウェルカムトゥ東京駅); 68. Neko no Kimagureda to Shite mo (ネコの気まぐれだとしても); 69. Kabocha no Nimono no Yōna Kaori (かぼちゃの煮物のような香り); 70. Kimi o Tojikomeru Mangetsu (君を閉じ込める満月)
9	July 6, 2023	978-4-253-28109-6	—	—
71. Shall we Horā Dansu (Shall we ホラーダンス); 72. Enman Taisha no Susume (円満退社のススメ); 73. Kazari Janai no? Namida wa (飾りじゃないの? 涙は); 74. Hakamairi-go wa Itsumo Yūyake (墓参り後はいつも夕焼け); 75. Naze Chotto Ureshī Ndarou (なぜちょっと嬉しいんだろう); 76. Ringu no ue no Sansha Mendan (リングの上の三者面談); 77. Enbun Ōbādōzu (塩分オーバードーズ); 78. Namekuji, Nakami wa Nyūhakushoku (蛞蝓、中身は乳白色); 79. Nankō Furaku no Honkō Nite (難攻不落の本校にて)
10	September 7, 2023	978-4-253-28110-2	—	—
80. Ogama re Uru Gyōretsu (拝まれうる行列); 81. Inryoku o Motsu Kanojo wa Tsuki (引力を持つ彼女は月); 82. Aru Danshi ga Pantsu ni Tsuchi o Irete Tarashī (ある男子がパンツに土を入れてたらしい); 83. Kōki no Me Sorasanaide (好奇の目 そらさないで); 84. Māburu Moyō no Ichiban Ī Basho (マーブル模様の1番いい場所); 85. Hankai no Yoroi ni Keii o (半壊の鎧に敬意を); 86. Shiokaze de Kami ga Kishimu Yō ni (潮風で髪が軋むように); 87. Kekkyoku, Amagoi no Dansu (結局、雨乞いのダンス); 88. Junpaku no Sakazuki o Kawasu Naka (純白の盃を交わす仲)
11	November 8, 2023	978-4-253-28111-9	—	—
89. Burakku Kigyō ni Ikebana o (ブラック企業に生け花を); 90. Boku wa Ima Nemuri no Naka (僕はいま 眠りのなか); 91. Nenrei Kakunin o Sasayaite (年齢確認を囁いて); 92. Koegawari no Sairen (声変わりのサイレン); 93. Kenshi no Emōshon (研士のエモーション); 94. Tenbin o Sabitsuka Sete (天秤を錆びつかせて); 95. Koumori wa Namekuji no Su e (蝙蝠は蛞蝓の巣へ); 96. Sanda Kunchi no Mittsu no Tanbo (三田くんちの三つの田んぼ); 97. Ōkami Yamato Sori-bin (オオカミヤマト ソリ便)
12	January 5, 2024	978-4-253-28112-6	—	—
98. Nai Mono wa Tsukurimashou (Higōhō) (ないものは作りましょう (非合法)); 99. Makkana Gūzō Sūhai (真っ赤な偶像崇拝); 100. Gake no ue no Shinja to Kyōso (崖の上の信者と教祖); 101. Hi no Nai Tokoro ni Kemuri ga Tatta (火のない所に煙が立った); 102. Kodomo no Judō Kitsuen ni Tsuite (子どもの受動喫煙について); 103. Kimi no Tekitōna Shōdoku (君のテキトーな消毒); 104. Hinoko to Sarai no Sora e (火の粉とサライの空へ); 105. Kiraina Kotoba wa Angā Manejimento (嫌いな言葉はアンガーマネジメント); 106. Nodobotoke ga Arawareru Made no Yokogao (喉仏が現れるまでの横顔)
13	April 8, 2024	978-4-253-28113-3	—	—
107. Sore wa Hakari Shirenu Gishiki (それは計り知れぬ儀式); 108. Keidai no Uchūsen (境内の宇宙船); 109. Do Pinku no Keroido (どピンクのケロイド); 110. Amanogawa o Gyakusō (天の川を逆走); 111. Juso: Musume wa Daitai Papa ni (呪詛:娘は大体パパ似); 112. Kamaeshi Kyo Dokuro (構えし巨髑髏); 113. Haru no Hizashi no Shikei Senkoku (春の日差しの死刑宣告); 114. Ruisen o Nigirishimete (涙腺を握り締めて); 115. Osoreruru ni Michitariru On'na (恐るるに満ち足りる女)
14	June 7, 2024	978-4-253-28114-0	—	—
116. Yūben'na Otoko-tachi (雄弁な男たち); 117. Shakyō Yōshi Daunrōdo-chū (写経用紙ダウンロード中); 118. Kimi no Dōkō Sandai Kin o Chidjimetai (君の瞳孔散大筋を縮めたい); 119. Hīru no Bigaku (ヒールの美学); 120. Hito Name de You Wain (ひと舐めで酔うワイン); 121. Ryōte ni Uwaru Yanagi no Ki (両手に植わる柳の木); 122. Doro Pakku no Atatakasa (泥パックの温かさ); 123. O-sa-ge no Tomodachi Kara Kimi e (おさげの友達から君へ); 124. Zensaku no Ansā-tekina (前作のアンサー的な)
15	August 7, 2024	978-4-253-28115-7	—	—
125. Mitake Hyaku Sanjū Daime Toushu (三田家130代目当主); 126. Saikō no Shitsuren (最高の失恋); 127. Suna no Shiro no Naka wa Suna (砂の城の中は砂); 128. Hau to be Sokushinbutsu (How to be 即身仏); 129. Achira no Kawa no Jijō (あちらの川の事情); 130. Anogoro-buri ni Megaatta (あの頃ぶりに目が合った); 131. Shinigami ni Kenketsu (死神に献血); 132. Kūkyo no Yaku Jū-pēji (空虚の約十頁); 133. Dan Hyaku Ko-bun no On'na (弾100個分の女)
16	October 8, 2024	978-4-253-28116-4	—	—
134. Aogeba Tōtoshi Tsue (仰げば尊し杖); 135. Tainai no Yōkōro (体内の溶鉱炉); 136. Ai no su wa Anadarake (愛の巣は穴だらけ); 137. Imawa no Dibēto (今際のディベート); 138. Mienai Shōjō Nigirishimete (見えない賞状握りしめて); 139. Riborubā-shi Ki Rin'ne Tensei (リボルバー式輪廻転生); 140. Tsubureta Ichigo no Subarashisa (潰れた苺の素晴らしさ); 141. Kotae Awase no Hibi (答え合わせの日々); 142. Itte Rasshai Santa Kurōsu (行ってらっしゃいサンタクロース)

=== Anime ===
In July 2024, it was announced that the manga would receive an anime television series adaptation produced by Science Saru. It was directed by Tomohisa Shimoyama, with Kimiko Ueno supervising and writing the series scripts, Masamichi Ishiyama serving as character designer and chief animation director, and music composed by Tomoyuki Tanaka. The series aired from October 4 to December 20, 2025, on the Animeism programming block on MBS, TBS, CBC and BS-TBS. (Note: MBS, TBS and CBC listed the series premiere on October 3 at 25:53, which is effectively October 4 at 1:53 a.m. JST.) The opening theme is "Childlike Adults" (アダルトチックチルドレン, Adaruto Chikku Chirudoren), performed by Yama, while the ending theme is "Diary" (ダイアリー, Daiarī), performed by Soushi Sakiyama. Amazon Prime Video streamed the series worldwide.

==== Episodes ====
No.	Title	Directed by (Note: Production staff information is taken from the ending credits of each episode.)	Storyboarded by	Original release date
1	"Everything's Bright, Am I Aging?"; Transliteration: "Subete ga Mabushii, Kore ga Oi ka" (Japanese: 全てが眩しい これが老いか)	Tomohisa Shimoyama	Tomohisa Shimoyama	October 4, 2025
In a middle school on December 25, 2080, Shiori Fuyumura attempts to murder her classmate Kazushige Sanda, believing he is connected to Santa Claus and hoping he can locate her missing friend Ichie Ono, who still believes in Christmas and is presumed dead. Fuyumura subtly goads Sanda into lowering his guard by following the traditions associated with Santa Claus. Fuyumura then fatally stabs Sanda after he remarks having no knowledge of the tradition. When Fuyumura panics at Sanda remaining motionless despite her efforts, his bloodstained shirt transforms him into Santa Claus, who reveals he was always aware of his dual identity. To test his powers, Fuyumura bombs the school with a bomb vest, but Sanda intercepts the explosion and survives unscathed with Fuyumura due to Santa's supernatural abilities, unaware that another student witnessed the situation.
2	"Candies, Canes, Kisses, and Blades"; Transliteration: "Ame to Muchi to Kisu to Ha to" (Japanese: 飴と鞭とキスと刃と)	Rushio Moriyama	Rushio Moriyama	October 11, 2025
Sanda decides to help Fuyumura and gradually exhibits more of Santa's compassionate behavior. He is confronted by his roommate Hitoshi Amaya, who reveals his knowledge of Sanda's dual identity following the bombing. Amaya attempts to blackmail Sanda and Fuyumura into kissing each other when they are interrupted by the arrival of headmaster Hifumi Oshibu, who reprimands Amaya on his problematic behavior. Not wanting to see Amaya being punished, Santa intervenes and warns Oshibu to back off, before escaping with Fuyumura and Amaya. Amaya later explains that he wants the tradition of Christmas to be rekindled in Japan following decades of hardship and allow his family to thrive again. Warmed by Amaya's dream, Santa agrees to help him and reverts back to Sanda, and he, Amaya, and Fuyumura promise to keep his dual identity a secret from Oshibu. Meanwhile, Oshibu issues a task force called the St. Nick Pursuit Unit to apprehend Santa.
3	"Charred Fruit Tastes All the Sweeter"; Transliteration: "Kudamono Moereba Amaku Naru" (Japanese: 果物燃えれば甘くなる)	Takuya Yoshihara	Takuya Yoshihara	October 18, 2025
The trio discovers Sanda's ability to detect lies after Amaya surmises it is connected to the belief of naughty children, which they use to evade Oshibu's suspicion. Fuyumura later uses it to interrogate their class on Ono's whereabouts, only for Sanda to be knocked out. Sanda becomes troubled by his new ability, but Fuyumura asks him to remain steadfast upon proving her pain with Ono's absence. The trio are later stunned to encounter Ono alive, though they fail to catch her. Two days later, Oshibu holds a funeral for Ono in the hopes of luring Santa with the help of the St. Nick Pursuit Unit led by Saburo Yagiuda. While on guard duty, Yagiuda stumbles on the trio planning their intervention of the funeral and hears Sanda's dual identity. Yagiuda wounds Sanda to force Santa to come out and states his plan to capture him.
4	"Zeus, Smasher of Textbooks"; Transliteration: "Kyōkasho Tsukiyaburishi Zeusu" (Japanese: 教科書突き破りしゼウス)	Tomohisa Taguchi	Tomohisa Taguchi	October 25, 2025
Santa reluctantly holds back in fighting Yagiuda, allowing the latter to overpower him. Yagiuda explains that his plan to capture Santa is to prevent children from gaining hope amidst a dystopian society maintained by adults. Upon learning his true mission, a confident Santa resumes his fight with Yagiuda while Ono's funeral begins. As Fuyumura and Amaya observe the fight, Fuyumura recalls her complicated feelings for Ono and reluctance to believe in myths such as Santa Claus. Santa crashes into the funeral during the fight, exposing himself to Sanda's classmates and a frustrated Oshibu. Santa approaches Ono's picture and promises to find her, stunning the school as Fuyumura helps him escape. Santa's appearance becomes trending in school several days later and is regarded as a god, overwhelming Sanda. Fuyumura thanks Sanda and opens up on her insecurities with Ono's disappearance, allowing Sanda to emotionally bond with Fuyumura.
5	"A Typhoon in a Snow Globe"; Transliteration: "Sunōdōmu no Naka no Taifū" (Japanese: スノードームの中の台風)	Iyo Satō & Asami Murakoshi	Eri Kinoshita	November 1, 2025
Sanda becomes conflicted on how he sees Fuyumura, and Amaya adds it may complicate his arranged relationship with his fiancée Niko Kazao. Despite Sanda promising not to fall in love while maintaining his dual identity, he becomes troubled when he reciprocates Kazao's affection. Yagiuda also infiltrates the school as a teacher after being punished by Oshibu, further alarming Sanda. The two attempt to fight, when Sanda finds out he is losing the ability to transform into Santa. Meanwhile, Fuyumura tells Kazao to back off from Sanda, but Kazao misinterprets Fuyumura's actions as romantic intent. Kazao interrogates Fuyumura on whether she likes Sanda or Ono more, causing Fuyumura to question her own identity. Fuyumura is reunited with Ono, who kisses her and reveals she ran away after discovering she had undergone puberty and feared Oshibu's reprisal. Fuyumura comforts Ono with Santa's reassurance of growing old, as they are both confronted by Oshibu.
6	"Cyborg vs. Santa Claus"; Transliteration: "Jinzō Ningen vs. Santa Kurōsu" (Japanese: 人造人間vsサンタクロース)	Akitoshi Yokoyama	Akitoshi Yokoyama	November 8, 2025
Oshibu attempts to punish Ono for growing into an adult when Sanda intervenes and reveals his dual identity to protect her and Fuyumura. A stunned Oshibu fails to see Sanda, however, due to his eyes falling out. Realizing that his powers are connected to accepting puberty and adulthood, Sanda embraces it and gains Santa's full power. Santa tries to peacefully talk with Oshibu, leaving the latter offended and he begins their duel. Santa is overwhelmed by Oshibu's artificial strength despite receiving a surge of energy from Fuyumura, Amaya, and Ono's assistance. As Oshibu wounds Santa, they are interrupted by the school's elderly director, Toyo Tetsudome. Tetsudome easily overwhelms Oshibu in spite of her age, surprising Santa. He asks Tetsudome to teach him how to match Oshibu's strength, while Oshibu vows to find out Santa's true identity as revenge. Fuyumura and Ono reconnect, though Ono observes Fuyumura's closer bond with Sanda after experiencing Fuyumura being distant with her in the past.
7	"Double-Faced Carnivorous Plant"; Transliteration: "Kagehinata no Shokuchūshokubutsu" (Japanese: 陰日向の食虫植物)	Shugō Tsuneoka	Tomohisa Shimoyama & Santarō Iwakura	November 15, 2025
Amaya distances himself from Sanda after he worries that Oshibu may figure out Sanda's identity through their friendship. Amaya makes amends when Sanda states his willingness to protect them. Meanwhile, an infuriated Oshibu admonishes Yagiuda for failing to capture Santa. Oshibu decides on an alternative to kill Santa without relying on Yagiuda. Sanda and Kazao assist a student named Fumi Namatame, who they discover is part of a class that killed adults. Kazao later realizes she left her keychain in Namatame's classroom, which Sanda uses as an opportunity to prove himself to Tetsudome. He transforms into Santa and is cornered by Namatame and her classmates, where Namatame claims all the students are being held captive inside the school. As Namatame prepares to mutilate Santa, Fuyumura and Amaya intervene.
8	"Love, the Most Selfish Thing There Is"; Transliteration: "Kyūkyoku no Wagamama wa Renai to Imashite" (Japanese: 究極のわがままは恋愛といいまして)	Mari Motohashi & Shinya Kawabe	Mari Motohashi	November 22, 2025
Fuyumura and Amaya provide Santa an opening to escape from Namatame unnoticed, and he later thanks them. Sanda then attempts to harden his conflicted heart, leading to him almost revealing his Santa form to Kazao when the latter asks for a kiss. Sanda is confronted by Yagiuda, who warns him that falling for a female classmate may result in his death. Despite this, Sanda allows himself to be kissed by Kazao, which he survives to Yagiuda's relief. Meanwhile, Fuyumura tries to come to terms with Ono's growth as an adult woman, and Ono tells her of her plans to leave the school. Ono confides in Sanda of her wish to bond with Fuyumura one last time at the upcoming Peak of Youth Ceremony. Elsewhere, Namatame, who is revealed to be working under Oshibu, promises to kill Santa at the ceremony after proving herself to kill without remorse and restraint.
9	"A Fake Flower, Yet Its Roots Rot"; Transliteration: "Zōkananoni ne Kusare" (Japanese: 造花なのに根腐れ)	Asami Murakoshi & Takuya Yoshihara	Asami Murakoshi, Tomohisa Shimoyama, & Mari Motohashi	November 29, 2025
Sensing that Oshibu is planning something for the ceremony, Tetsudome trains Santa to not hold back in fighting all types of opponents, including killers like Namatame. To his shock, Santa unlocks a new form called "Black Santa", and Tetsudome congratulates him. Sanda later crosses paths with Namatame, and he ponders on using his Black Santa form to punish her. Namatame recounts killing her mother upon seeing her deteriorate mentally from wanting to maintain her youth when Sanda accidentally exposes himself as Santa, prompting Namatame to declare a duel between them. While Sanda trains with a hesitant Amaya to harden himself, Fuyumura and Ono bond. Ono confesses her love to Fuyumura and they undress to confirm their feelings, leaving Fuyumura to realize that Ono has truly grown up as an adult. Ono asks if she likes Sanda, further distressing Fuyumura. An anguished Fuyumura demands Sanda to have the child Ono return, as Oshibu approaches Ono on her troubles.
10	"You, an Everlasting Moment"; Transliteration: "Nagai Isshun no Yōna Kimi" (Japanese: 長い一瞬のような君)	Iyo Satō	Akitoshi Yokoyama	December 6, 2025
On the day of the Peak of Youth Ceremony, Yagiuda tells Sanda and Amaya to enjoy the event as he decides to take Sanda's place in dueling Namatame. Sanda spends time with Kazao, where they share a kiss. However, Sanda hears a gunshot, and he rushes to take over from Yagiuda and fight Namatame using his Black Santa form. Overjoyed at the challenge, Namatame lets her classmates attack Santa. Santa nonviolently pacifies them and urges Namatame to stand down. Meanwhile, Fuyumura and Ono spend time at the ceremony, when Fuyumura also overhears the gunshot. Ono, realizing that Fuyumura does not reciprocate her feelings, allows her to check on Sanda as she begins reeling in pain. Back at the duel, Namatame repeatedly shoots Santa, and Santa worries their fight will never end.
11	"Flashback Attack"; Transliteration: "Sōmatō no Shinkō" (Japanese: 走馬灯の侵攻)	Akitoshi Yokoyama	Akitoshi Yokoyama	December 13, 2025
Fuyumura arrives in time to wound Namatame, and Santa escapes with Fuyumura. Santa remarks to Amaya and Fuyumura that he has to fight Namatame. When Fuyumura points out that a fight between two children is less severe than a fight between a child and adult, Santa reverts back to Sanda and fights her. Namatame sees Sanda switching interchangeably into Santa and recalls her fear of growing old, as the back-and-forth transformation places a strain on Sanda's body. Despite this, Sanda stands his ground and comforts Namatame after saving her from a fire as Santa. Oshibu meets him in person and Santa immediately fights him in public. Upon seeing Santa's determination, Fuyumura runs off to find Ono, who has begun accepting her imminent death after Oshibu tells her it is caused from going through puberty sooner than expected.
12	"Pale Blue Pall"; Transliteration: "Pēru Burū no Tobari" (Japanese: ペールブルーの帳)	Tomohisa Shimoyama	Tomohisa Shimoyama	December 20, 2025
Oshibu dodges Santa's attacks and attempts to exact his revenge from being humiliated in their first duel. As the school's students cheer on Oshibu, Santa wonders why he wants to become stronger. Realizing he wants to have children believe in him, Santa gains the upper hand and discovers he has gotten more agile, leading him to conclude he is now believing on his own abilities. Despite this, he fails to defeat Oshibu, and the latter escapes. Sanda's friends nevertheless congratulate him. Fuyumura and Ono later reunite and walk together, where Fuyumura confesses her honest feelings for Ono out of a desire to hold on to their memories. Satisfied that Fuyumura was able to express her thoughts, Ono peacefully passes away. Sanda reflects on Ono's final request mentioning he take care of Fuyumura. A week after the ceremony, Fuyumura becomes despondent and immensely grieves for Ono's death. Fuyumura breaks down in tears upon accepting the new reality, and Sanda comforts her as his own person and not as Santa.

== Reception ==
=== Manga ===
Ridge Harripersad of CGMagazine noted the manga's narrative depth, observing that it contained strange stories from Itagaki. He described the artwork as distinct from her previous series, Beastars, and highlighted her distinctive interpretation of Santa Claus. Although he initially found the protagonist stereotypical, Harripersad later considered the characterization appealing, drawing a parallel to Okarun from Dandadan. Bolts from Anime News Network praised the handling of the lore and the Santa character, but criticized Sanda's tendency to overanalyze situations and Fuyumura for occasionally mistreating him despite her reliance on Santa's power. Raquel Ramia of Akibahara Station commended the narrative for its themes of children leaving childhood behind, which resulted in significant character development for the main cast. She speculated about the potential for a love triangle despite its absence in early chapters, and praised the artwork for its fight scenes and detailed character expressions during dramatic moments. Reviewers at Manga News expressed surprise at the violence in the fourth volume, particularly a subplot involving a criminal and Sanda dealing with children's deadly wishes, which one reviewer found graphically disturbing.

Kō Aokage of Real Sound called Sanda a unique fantasy hero story that used the premise of a child transforming into Santa to reflect on modern societal issues, such as low birth rates and excessive state control. Aokage noted that the series explores the contradiction between state protection and individual autonomy, with its "intergenerational" and "system versus individual" themes resonating strongly. By forgoing the "anthropomorphization" metaphor of Beastars and having characters confront the system directly, the drama was considered more realistic, suggesting a maturation of the author's perspective.

=== Anime ===
Lucas DeRuyter from Anime News Network enjoyed the "ridiculous" premise and found Sanda's powers and the series' setting compelling. The animation by Science Saru was praised for its visuals in the premiere, particularly a scene where the protagonist uses his powers against an explosion. DeRuyter, who watched the English dub, commended Ben Balmaceda for his energetic portrayal of Santa Claus. Chris Beveridge of The Fandom Post found the initial conflict between Fuyumura and Sanda intriguing and noted the unique character designs. He considered the story over-the-top but felt the duality of Sanda and Santa was effective, expressing interest in future episodes. Isaiah Colbert of Gizmodo enjoyed the mix of horror and comedy. He stated that the anime stood out due to Itagaki's storytelling, which reminded the reviewer of his positive experience with Beastars, and commented that Science Saru amplified the manga's appeal.

Elijah Gonzalez of Endless Mode praised the anime's portrayal of LGBTQ+ themes, gender, and puberty in a healthy manner. He cited the handling of Fuyumura's identity and her relationship with Ono as major examples. In an article titled Sanda Shows that Adolescence is Supposed to be Awkward for Anime News Network, DeRuyter noted that the series' core theme involved accepting adulthood, a process embodied by the protagonist obtaining new powers awakened by his genes. DeRuyter also noted that the protagonist was distinguished by his sympathy toward the Fuyumura during her identity crisis, a condition society refused to acknowledge in children. As the narrative progressed, Sanda sought out other individuals troubled by social issues that adults ignored, aiding them while simultaneously improving his relationship with Fuyumura. The ANN editorial team listed the series as the best anime of Fall 2025, citing its lore and themes, as well as its production values. Steve Jones related to the characters' reflections on their growth while watching the series, as he did with his own experiences of puberty. It was also listed as the seventh best anime of 2025.

Commenting on the series' thought-provoking themes, Ross Locksley from UK Anime Network said that, while Santa is an appealing character due to his powers and personality, the anime stands out more for its large cast and focus on drama. A major example of this is Sanda's fiancée, Nico, who, rather than being a stereotypical abusive heroine, is actually devoted to her relationship with Sanda, while Fuyumura also has a notable relationship with Ono. The antagonists Namatame and Oshibu also received positive response for their portrayal of the theme of staying young.
