= Kazushige Touhara =

Japanese biologist

- Born: Japan
- Education: The University of Tokyo
- Known for: Olfaction, Pheromone, Taste, Neuroscience
- Scientific career
- Fields: Chemoreception
- Workplaces: The University of Tokyo
- Doctoral advisor: Glenn D. Prestwich
- Other academic advisors: Robert Lefkowitz

Kazushige Touhara (Japanese: 東原 和成) is a Japanese biologist, neuroscientist, and a professor at the University of Tokyo, Japan.

After training in the field of organic chemistry, insect endocrinology, and GPCR signaling, he began to establish his team to conducted research on chemoreception with support from Hiroshi Kataoka.

In 2024, he serves as the head of the Union of Japanese Societies for Biological Science and is involved in initiatives such as advocating for the doubling of Japan's scientific research funding. Additionally, he has published several essays focused on improving education and scientific research in Japan.

== Research ==
=== Plants ===
- Discovery that transcriptional regulatory factors are involved in plant chemical sensing.

=== Insects ===
- Detection of olfactory signals using Xenopus oocytes with using a co-receptor.
- Demonstration that insect olfactory receptors are ion channels, not GPCRs.
- Detection of taste signals using Xenopus oocytes without using any co-receptors.

=== Mammals ===
- Functional characterization of an olfactory receptor expressed in olfactory neurons.
- Functional characterization of an olfactory receptor expressed in tissues other than olfactory neurons.
- Detection of olfactory signals in vitro.
- Identification of a natural ligand of an olfactory receptor.
- Identification of a musk olfactory receptor.
- Discovery of tears as a pheromone source.
- Discovery of blood as a chemosensory cue.

=== Human ===
- Clarification of the spatiotemporal dynamics of odor representations in the brain.

== Awards and honors ==
- Frank Allison Linville's RH Wright Award in Olfactory Research (2006)
- Japan Academy Medal (2009)
- Kunio Yamazaki Distinguished Lectureship Award (2017)

== Early life ==
He was well known as a tennis player at his university during his college years. It is said that he once aspired to be an actor.

== Career ==
- 1989 B.Sc. (Department of Agricultural Chemistry, The University of Tokyo, Japan)
- 1993 Ph.D. in Biological Chemistry (Department of Chemistry, State University of New York at Stony Brook, U.S.A.)
- 1993.7-1995.9 Post doctoral fellow, Duke University Medical Center
- 1995.10-1998.3 Assistant Professor, The University of Tokyo, School of Medicine, Department of Neurochemistry
- 1998.4-1999.3 Assistant professor, Kobe University, Biosignal Research Center
- 1999.4-2009.11 Associate Professor, The University of Tokyo, Department of Integrated Biosciences
- 2009.12-present Professor, The University of Tokyo, Department of Applied Biological Chemistry

Just before he was hired as an associate professor at the University of Tokyo, Nature published an article addressing concerns about the employment of younger researchers.
