= Baki the Grappler =

Japanese manga series

- First tankōbon volume cover, featuring Baki Hanma

グラップラー刃牙 (Gurappurā Baki)
- Genre: Martial arts
- Manga
- Written by: Keisuke Itagaki
- Published by: Akita Shoten
- English publisher: NA: Gutsoon! Entertainment (former, first series); Kodama Tales (current, first and second series); Media Do International (digital, second series)
- Imprint: Shōnen Champion Comics
- Magazine: Weekly Shōnen Champion
- English magazine: Raijin Comics (2002–04)
- Original run: September 30, 1991 – present
- Volumes: 156
- Manga parts
- 1. Baki the Grappler (1991-1999, 42 volumes); 2. Baki (1999-2005, 31 volumes); 3. Baki Hanma (2005-2012, 37 volumes); 4. Baki-Dou (2014-2018, 22 volumes); 5. Bakidou (2018-2023, 17 volumes); 6. Baki Rahen (2023-present, 7 volumes)
- Anime television series
- Directed by: Hitoshi Nanba (series 1); Katsuyoshi Yatabe (series 1); Toshiki Hirano (series 2–4)
- Written by: Atsuhiro Tomioka (series 1); Tatsuhiko Urahata (series 2–4)
- Music by: Project Baki (series 1); Kenji Fujisawa (series 2–4)
- Studio: Group TAC (series 1); TMS Entertainment (series 2–4)
- Original run: January 8, 2001 – June 18, 2026
- Episodes: 151
- Anime series titles
- 1. Baki the Grappler (48 episodes); 2. Baki (39 episodes); 3. Baki Hanma (39 episodes); 4. Baki-Dou (25 episodes)
Further information
Original video animation
The Ultimate Fighter
Directed by	Yuji Asada
Produced by	Chiaki Yasuda; Tsuneo Seto
Written by	Yoshihisa Araki
Music by	Takahiro Saito
Studio	Knack Productions
Licensed by	AUS: Manga Entertainment; NA: Central Park Media
Released	August 21, 1994
Runtime	45 minutes
Video game
Fighting Fury
Developer	Tomy
Publisher	Tomy, Midas Interactive
Genre	Fighting
Platform	PlayStation 2
Released	JP: October 12, 2000; UK: July 26, 2003
Original video animation
Baki: Most Evil Death Row Convicts
Directed by	Teiichi Takiguchi
Produced by	Yu Kiyozono
Music by	Kenji Fujisawa
Studio	Telecom Animation Film
Released	December 6, 2016
Runtime	15 minutes
Manga
Baki Gaiden: Retsu Kaio wa Isekai Tensei Shitemo Ikkō Kamawan!
Written by	Sai Ihara (original plan); Keisuke Itagaki (original story)
Illustrated by	Eiji Murai
Published by	Akita Shoten
Imprint	Shōnen Champion Comics
Magazine	Monthly Shōnen Champion
Original run	November 6, 2020 – present
Volumes	17
Anime film
Baki Hanma vs. Kengan Ashura
Directed by	Toshiki Hirano
Written by	Atsuo Ishino
Music by	Team MAX
Studio	TMS Entertainment
Licensed by	Netflix
Released	June 6, 2024
Runtime	65 minutes
Anime
Baki Gaiden: Retsu Kaio wa Isekai Tensei Shitemo Ikkō Kamawan!
Studio	TMS Entertainment
- icon

Baki the Grappler (Japanese: グラップラー刃牙, Hepburn: Gurappurā Baki) is a Japanese manga series written and illustrated by Keisuke Itagaki. It was originally serialized in the shōnen manga magazine Weekly Shōnen Champion from September 1991 to 1999 and collected into 42 tankōbon volumes by Akita Shoten. The story follows teenager Baki Hanma as he trains and tests his fighting skills against a variety of different opponents in deadly, no-rules hand-to-hand combat.

The series was followed by five sequels in the same magazine; Baki (バキ; officially romanized as New Grappler Baki: In Search of Our Strongest Hero), which was serialized from 1999 to 2005 and collected into 31 volumes, Baki Hanma (範馬刃牙, Hanma Baki; officially romanized as Baki: Son of Ogre), which was serialized from 2005 to 2012 and collected into 37 volumes, Baki-Dou (刃牙道, Baki-Dō; lit. 'Baki's Way'), which was serialized from 2014 to 2018 and collected into 22 volumes, a fifth series, also named Bakidou (バキ道, Bakidō; lit. 'Baki's Way') but with Baki's name written in katakana instead of kanji, serialized from 2018 to 2023 and collected into 17 volumes, and Baki Rahen (刃牙らへん, Baki Rahen; lit. 'Baki and Others'), serialized from 2023.

A 45-minute original video animation (OVA) was released in 1994. A 24-episode anime aired on TV Tokyo between January 8 and June 25, 2001, and was quickly followed by a second 24-episode series from July 22 to December 24, 2001. An original net animation (ONA) was released on Netflix between June 25 and September 24, 2018, followed by a second season that was released on June 4, 2020. A third season was released from September 30, 2021, to August 24, 2023, and an anime adaptation of Baki-Dou was released on February 26, 2026; a second cours was released in June 2026. An anime adaptation of Baki Gaiden: Retsu Kaio wa Isekai Tensei Shitemo Ikkō Kamawan! has been announced. The OVA was the first to be licensed and released in North America, in 1998 by Central Park Media, followed by the original manga series in 2002 by Gutsoon! Entertainment (incomplete), and finally both anime series in 2005 by Funimation Entertainment. Media Do International began releasing the second manga series digitally in August 2018. Kodama Tales began publishing the manga series in English worldwide in October 2025.

The Baki series is one of the best-selling manga series of all time, with over 100 million copies in circulation.

== Plot ==
Baki Hanma is raised by his wealthy mother, Emi Akezawa, who also funds his training in the hopes that he can be a powerful warrior like his father, Yujiro Hanma. Around the start of the series, Baki outgrows traditional training and heads out to follow the path of his ruthless father's training, and meets many powerful fighters along the way. Eventually, Baki fights his father and is beaten without a challenge. Emi, who tries to save him, is killed by Yujiro, causing Baki to hate him.

After being beaten, Baki travels around the world continuing his training. Years later, he finds an underground fighting arena where he fights some of the most powerful fighters of various styles of martial arts. It is here he truly begins to hone his martial arts skills. He intends to get stronger, surpass his father, and continue to endure and survive the numerous hurdles he encounters in his journey.

Baki the Grappler (グラップラー刃牙, Gurappurā Baki)
Tells the story of the young Baki Hanma who enters a world of illegal underground fights and quickly becomes the champion of the fighting arena below the Tokyo Dome stadium. Later in the story, Baki's past is shown, in which a 13-year-old Baki trains to defeat his father Yujiro Hanma in battle, doing so to earn his mother's love. After Emi interrupts Baki and Yujiro's fight, the latter murders her and Baki swears revenge. Back in the present day, the promoter of the underground arena, Mitsunari Tokugawa arranges for a special tournament titled the "Maximum Tournament" to be held in order to decide who is the strongest fighter in the world. After winning all of his fights, Baki fights Jack Hammer, his half-brother and another son of Yujiro.

Baki (バキ; officially romanized as New Grappler Baki: In Search of Our Strongest Hero)
Set shortly after the conclusion of the previous series, it showcases Baki's attempts at going to study at high school like a regular teenager. However, his efforts are cut short when five death row inmates escape confinement and head to Tokyo in order to "know defeat". These inmates are the American Kung-fu fighter Dorian, the British assassin Hector Doyle, the Russian convict Sikorsky with a powerful pinching ability, the American Spec with a formidable lung capacity, and the Japanese poisoner Ryuko Yanagi. Following Baki's fight with Yanagi, the former becomes fatally poisoned and is flown to China to participate in the Chinese "Great Raitai Tournament" to save his life. Following a match against a Chinese poison master who reverses Baki's poisoning, Baki is saved and proceeds to fight alongside his allies in the tournament. Following the tournament's conclusion, the son of Mohammad Alai, Mohammad Alai Jr., challenges Baki to win over the heart of Baki's girlfriend, Kozue. When the fight between the two ends, Baki challenges his father for a rematch to conclude his career as a fighter. Yujiro accepts this invitation and declares Baki to be worthy of being his "prey".

Baki Hanma (範馬刃牙, Hanma Baki; officially romanized as Baki: Son of Ogre – The Boy Fascinating the Fighting God)
Begins with Baki meeting an elementary school student named Rumina, who challenges him to a fight after being pressured to do so by bullies. Baki "defeats" Rumina and shows him a shadow boxing fight against a 100-kilogram praying mantis. Following this fight, Baki kidnaps George W. Bosch to enter Arizona State Prison, home of the strongest man in America, Biscuit Oliva. In the prison, Baki meets with Jun Guevara and later fights Oliva. In the meantime, scientists in Colorado find and reanimate a man who lived in the Jurassic era. The man, named "Pickle", only eats those he defeats in battle, and after he assaults a news reporter on live television, the various fighters of the story take an interest in Pickle and proceed to fight him. Baki eventually matches against Pickle as well, driving the ancient man to his limits. After the conclusion of the fight, Baki finishes training for the fight against his father. Later, Baki and Yujiro dine in a high-class restaurant, but when Baki questions Yujiro regarding the death of his mother, their battle finally erupts. After a long fight that takes place over the entire night in Shinjuku, the clash concludes.

Baki-Dou (刃牙道, Baki-Dō; lit. 'Baki's Way'; officially romanized as Baki-Dou: New Story of "Baki" – The Strongest Boy on the Earth)
Following the conclusion of the fight between Baki and Yujiro, the fighters of the story find themselves dealing with an incredible amount of boredom, as the clash between the father and son was the "peak" of what the world had to offer fighting-wise. This changes when Tokugawa utilizes cloning technology to revive Musashi Miyamoto, the legendary Japanese samurai of the 17th century. The revived Musashi battles some of the world's strongest fighters; however, his unique approach to fighting brings about different results than some of them initially expected.

Bakidou (バキ道, Bakidō; lit. 'Baki's Way')
Nomi no Sukune II, a descendant of the legendary figure Nomi no Sukune, who is said the be the founder of sumo wrestling, decides to take part in Tokugawa's underground arena. Former yokozuna Kinryūzan succeeds in getting several active professional sumo wrestlers to also compete against regulars of the arena, such as Baki.

Baki Rahen (刃牙らへん, Baki Rahen; lit. 'Baki and Others')
Follows Baki's half-brother, Jack Hanma, and his clashes with the series' other warriors as he utilizes his new original martial art "Goudou" ('The Way of Biting') in his battles. These occur after Jack challenged most of the series' cast to fight near the end of the fifth series. Eventually, Jack has a rematch with Pickle in the underground arena. He does so after wishing to see Pickle suffer in despair like he did following his initial defeat against the ancient man in the third series.

== Production ==
When asked how he is able to continue the series for over 30 years, Keisuke Itagaki said he believes it is because of all the eccentric characters; "It's not me who comes up with the story, the characters create it." He said he learned the importance of creating interesting characters in his first ten minutes at Kazuo Koike's Gekiga Sonjuku school for aspiring manga artists, which he joined in 1987. Itagaki also said he is always thinking of how to create non-traditional conclusions to the fights, in order to avoid the continuous introduction of increasingly stronger opponents often seen in battle manga, citing the Baki versus Yujiro fight as a good example.

Itagaki said he gives even the toughest male characters their own kind of beauty. He created Baki Hanma by copying an illustration of a girl by Keibun Ōta and adding masculine touches, such as raising the eyebrows and thickening the neck. He used feminine eyes in the style of artist Pater Sato as reference for those of the character Kaoru Hanayama. Although he always draws the hands of characters in the series large, Hanayama's hands in particular are made large enough to completely hide his face. Before he came up with the "demon face" that appears on Yujiro's back, Itagaki considered giving him a dragon tattoo where the limbs of the dragon blended into his own. But then he saw a photograph of a bodybuilder whose back looked like a Heikegani crab, which resemble human faces, and got the idea to deform it even further and use a more ferocious expression.

Itagaki imitated the ending scene of the 1982 American film Rocky III for the match between Antonio Igari and Mount Toba in Grappler Baki Gaiden. When it was announced that the Baki Hanma series would be ending in ten chapters, Itagaki had not yet thought up what he would draw. He also said that he originally decided that Baki Hanma would be the end of the franchise. But, just before the fight between Baki and his father was to begin, he suddenly had the thought, "What would happen if Musashi Miyamoto was born in the modern day?", leading to Baki-Dou. When asked about the titles of Baki-Dou and Bakidou, Itagaki said that with the story of a parent-child conflict concluded in Baki Hanma, he shifted to the theme of "What does it mean to be strong?" and the word dō (道, 'way') came to mind.

== Media ==
=== Manga ===
==== Main series ====
Baki the Grappler was serialized in Akita Shoten's Weekly Shōnen Champion magazine from September 30, 1991, to 1999, with the chapters collected into 42 tankōbon volumes. It was licensed for a North American release by Gutsoon! Entertainment, who published the first 46 chapters in their English-language manga anthology magazine Raijin Comics. The magazine's first issue was released on December 18, 2002, but in July 2004 it was discontinued. Four collected volumes were planned by Gutsoon!, but it is unknown if they were released. In May 2025, Kodama Tales announced it had licensed the series for a worldwide English release. They published the kanzenban edition both physically and digitally between October 2025 and September 2026.

The second manga series, simply titled Baki, was serialized in Weekly Shōnen Champion from 1999 to November 24, 2005, and collected into 31 volumes. It was licensed for English release by Media Do International, who released it digitally between August 2018 and August 2019. Kodama began publishing the second manga series in November 2026, under the "New Grappler Baki" title.

Baki Hanma was serialized in Weekly Shōnen Champion from December 1, 2005, to August 16, 2012, and collected into 37 volumes. In November 2026, Kodama Tales announced they have licensed the series for an English release and will begin publishing it in July 2027.

It was followed by Baki-Dou, which was serialized in Weekly Shōnen Champion from March 20, 2014, to April 5, 2018, and collected into 22 volumes. The fifth series has the same name as the fourth, but with Baki's name written in katakana instead of kanji. Bakidou was serialized in Weekly Shōnen Champion from October 4, 2018, to June 15, 2023, and collected into 17 volumes. Baki Rahen began serialization in Weekly Shōnen Champion on August 24, 2023.

==== Gaiden ====
- Grappler Baki Gaiden (グラップラー刃牙外伝) ― Set immediately after the Maximum Tournament, it depicts a wrestling match between Antonio Igari and Mount Toba. Nine chapters were published in one volume in 1999. An epilogue for Igari ran in Weekly Shōnen Champion's 48th issue on October 27, 2022.
- Baki: Tokubetsuhen Saga (バキ特別編SAGA; or The Romantic Contact Chapter) ― Side story that develops at the same time as volume 15 of the second manga. One volume was published in 2002.
- Baki Gaiden: Scarface (バキ外伝 疵面 -スカーフェイス-; or Scarface: Legend of the Invincible Fist) ― Spinoff series, written and illustrated by Yukinao Yamauchi, depicting Kaoru Hanayama's yakuza adventures. Ran from March 2005 to December 2007 in Champion Red, then from July 2009 in Weekly Shōnen Champion. Collected into eight volumes.
- Baki Hanma 10.5 Gaiden: Pickle (範馬刃牙10.5巻外伝ピクル) ― Set after volume 10 of the third manga, it introduces Pickle. Published in one volume in 2008.
- Baki Gaiden: Gaia (バキ外伝 GaiA) ― Spinoff series, written and illustrated by Hitoshi Tomizawa, starring Gaia. Published in Weekly Shōnen Champion in 2009.
- Baki Domoe (バキどもえ) ― Comedic spinoff, written and illustrated by Naoki Saito. Originally launched digitally on Weekly Shōnen Champion The Web in 2010, then serialized irregularly in Weekly Shōnen Champion and finally Bessatsu Shōnen Champion until October 2014. Collected into three volumes.
- Baki Gaiden: Kizuzura (バキ外伝 創面) ― Spinoff series, written and illustrated by Yukinao Yamauchi, based on Kaoru Hanayama's adventures in high school. Began in Bessatsu Shōnen Champion in July 2012. Collected into three volumes.
- Baki Gaiden: Kenjin (バキ外伝 拳刃) ― Spinoff series, written and illustrated by Kengou Miyatani, representing and describing Doppo's adventures. Began in Champion Red in June 2013. Collected into one volume.
- Yuenchi: Baki Gaiden (ゆうえんち〜バキ外伝〜) ― A spinoff novel series written by Baku Yumemakura and illustrated by Yuria Fujita. Serialized in Weekly Shōnen Champion from 2018 to 2021, and collected into five volumes. A collection of tales following the older brother of Katsumi Orochi; Mumon Katsuragi, who is responsible for the capture of the five most deadly criminals seen in Baki. It also includes characters from Yumemakura's own Garōden and Shishi no Mon novels. A manga adaptation illustrated by Fugita has been serialized monthly in Weekly Shōnen Champion since 2022. Collected into eight volumes as of August 2025.
- Baki: Revenge Tokyo (バキ REVENGE TOKYO) ― Special spin-off consisting of five chapters, each about one of the death row prisoners from the "Most Evil Death Row Convicts" arc, that have been added to the shinsōban edition of Baki in 2018.
- Grappler Baki: Remake (グラップラー刃牙) ― Two-chapter remake of the first chapter of Baki the Grappler, created in honor of Weekly Shōnen Champion's 50th anniversary.
- Baki Gaiden: Retsu Kaio wa Isekai Tensei Shitemo Ikkō Kamawan! (バキ外伝 烈海王は異世界転生しても一向にかまわんッッ) ― Spinoff series, illustrated by Eiji Murai and crediting Itagaki and Sai Ihara with the original story. It began in the November 6, 2020 issue of Monthly Shōnen Champion. An isekai series depicting Retsu Kaioh reincarnated into another world. Collected into seventeen volumes as of September 2026.
- Baki Gaiden: Gaia to Sikorsky ~Tokidoki Nomura Futari Dakedo San'nin Kurashi~ (バキ外伝 ガイアとシコルスキー 〜ときどきノムラ 二人だけど三人暮らし〜) ― Spinoff series, illustrated by Takaaki Hayashi. Began in the October 6, 2022, issue of Monthly Shōnen Champion. Set a few days after Gaia and Sikorsky's fight. Collected into eight volumes as of June 2025.
- Baki Gaiden: Hana no Chiharu (バキ外伝 花のチハル) ― Spinoff series written by Tomokazu Omatsu, and following the character Chiharu Shiba. Serialized in Champion Red from 2023 to 2024. Collected into three volumes.

==== Supplements ====
Two guidebooks, Baki Ultimate Book: Grappler Side, Byakko no Sho (BAKIアルティメットブック GRAPPLER SIDE 白虎之書) and Baki Ultimate Book: Fighting Side, Seiryū no Sho (BAKIアルティメットブック FIGHTING SIDE 青龍之書), were published by Akita Shoten on August 26, 2004. They compile the characters, events and battles fought up until volume 23 of the second manga series. San-ei Shobō published a two-volume mook series on March 6, 2019; Saidai Tournament-hen primarily covers the original manga, while Gekitotsu Chijō Saikyō-hen covers the subsequent series up to Baki-Dou. Each includes an interview with Itagaki, but the first also includes an interview with Tenshin Nasukawa and the second includes one with Riho Yoshioka. The artbook Baki 30th: The Artwork of Baki was published by Akita Shoten on December 6, 2024. It includes art from the series' 30-year run, including select fight scenes and famous quotes, as well as artwork originally created for a 30th anniversary exhibition held at Tokyo Dome City Hall in 2022.

=== Original video animations ===
A 45-minute original video animation (OVA) created by Knack Productions and directed by Yuji Asada was released in 1994. The story is a close adaptation of the first few volumes of the original manga, adapting the Karate Tournament arc (not adapted in the later TV series) and Baki's fight with Kosho Shinogi, later adapted in the episode 18 of the Baki the Grappler TV series. It was licensed and released under the title Grappler Baki: The Ultimate Fighter in North America by Central Park Media on VHS on December 1, 1996, and on DVD on December 1, 1998. Manga Entertainment later released it in Australia and the United Kingdom.

A 15-minute original animation DVD (OAD), referred to as Baki: Most Evil Death Row Convicts Special Anime (バキ 最凶死刑囚編SP(スペシャル)アニメ), was included with the limited edition of the 14th volume of Baki-Dou on December 6, 2016. However, it adapts the arc of the same name from the second manga series, which is titled simply Baki. Created by Telecom Animation Film, it was directed by Teiichi Takiguchi and focuses on five inmates who break out of prison from around the world and travel to Japan.

=== Anime ===
A 24-episode anime series aired on TV Tokyo between January 8 and June 25, 2001. The anime was produced by Free-Will, a music record label. A second 24-episode series, titled Baki the Grappler: Maximum Tournament (グラップラー刃牙 最大トーナメント編), as it tells the story from that part of the manga, aired from July 23 to December 24. All of the series' music was written and composed by "Project Baki", and all the theme songs were performed by Ryōko Aoyagi. The first anime's opening theme is "Ai Believe" (哀 believe), while its closing theme is "Reborn". For the second series, "All Alone" is used as the opening and "Loved..." as the closing. Baki the Grappler: Original Soundtrack was released on March 27, 2003.

Both series were licensed for a North American English release by Funimation Entertainment. They released both series as one on 12 DVDs, each with four episodes, beginning on June 14, 2005, with the last released on February 27, 2007. Two box sets were released on January 23, 2007, and March 25, 2008, the first included volumes 1-6 (1st series), while the second included 7-12 (2nd series). A set including every episode was released on September 2, 2008.

Funimation's English version was one of the launch shows on their own television channel, Funimation Channel, which debuted on June 19, 2006. Baki was broadcast on weekends at 11:30 pm, switching to the 10:00 pm slot on September 4, 2006. Dubbed in English, the episodes were edited for time but do not appear to have been edited for content. The opening theme is the song "Child Prey" by Japanese metal band Dir En Grey, which is signed to Free-Will.

In December 2016, it was announced that the "Most Evil Death Row Convicts" arc of the second manga series would be receiving an anime television adaptation. Titled Baki, like the second manga series, the 26-episode series is directed by Toshiki Hirano at TMS Entertainment with character designs handled by Fujio Suzuki and scripts overseen by Tatsuhiko Urahata. It began streaming on Netflix on June 25, 2018, in Japan, and started streaming on December 18, 2018, outside Japan. The series then started airing on several Japanese television channels beginning with Tokyo MX1 on July 1. Its opening theme song is "Beastful" by Granrodeo and its ending theme "Resolve" is performed by Azusa Tadokoro with lyrics by Miho Karasawa. Sentai Filmworks released it on Blu-ray on May 25, 2021, with a new English dub.

Netflix renewed the series for a second season on March 19, 2019. On March 5, 2020, it was announced that the main staff TMS Entertainment would be returning to produce the second season with the addition of a new character designer and art director. The 13-episode second season covering the "Great Chinese Challenge" and the Alai Jr. arcs was released exclusively on Netflix on June 4, 2020. Its opening theme is "Jounetsu wa Oboete Iru" performed by Granrodeo and its ending theme is "Dead Stroke" performed by Ena Fujita.

In September 2020, it was announced Hanma Baki: Son of Ogre will be adapted as the third series and the sequel to the second season of the Netflix series. The 12-episode series was released on Netflix on September 30, 2021, as Baki Hanma. The show's opening theme is "Treasure Pleasure" performed by Granrodeo while its ending theme is "Unchained World" performed by Generations from Exile Tribe. A second season was announced on March 24, 2022. The first half of the second season was released on July 26, and the second half on August 24, 2023. The second season has two openings and two endings. The first part's opening theme is "The Beast" by Wagakki Band, while Upstart performs its closing theme "Wilder". The second part opening is "Sarracenia" by Sky-Hi, while Be:First performs its closing theme "Salvia".

At AnimeJapan 2024, Netflix announced a crossover anime with Kengan Ashura, titled Baki Hanma vs. Kengan Ashura, which premiered on June 6 of the same year.

In March 2024, it was announced that the Baki-Dou manga would receive an anime adaptation by TMS Entertainment. The 13-episode series premiered on Netflix on February 26, 2026, which was followed by a second 12-episode cour on June 18.

In August 2026, it was announced that the Baki Gaiden: Retsu Kaio wa Isekai Tensei Shitemo Ikkō Kamawan! spinoff manga will receive an anime adaptation by TMS Entertainment.

==== Series overview ====
Series title	Season	Episodes	Original run	Musical themes		Format
Series title	Season	Episodes	Original run	Opening	Ending	Format
Baki the Grappler	1	24	January 8, 2001 — June 25, 2001	"I Believe" by Ryoko Aoyagi (Note: "I Believe" and "All Alone" were replaced by the song "Child Prey" by Dir En Grey in international releases.)	"Reborn" by Ryoko Aoyagi	TV series
Baki the Grappler	2	24	July 23, 2001 — December 24, 2001	"All Alone" by Ryoko Aoyagi	"Loved..." by Ryoko Aoyagi	TV series
Baki	3	26	June 25, 2018 — December 16, 2018	"Beastful" by Granrodeo	"Resolve" by Azusa Tadokoro	ONA
Baki	3	26	June 25, 2018 — December 16, 2018	"The Gong of Knockout" by Fear, and Loathing in Las Vegas	"Beautiful Beast" by Devil No ID	ONA
Baki	4	13	June 4, 2020	"Jōnetsu wa Oboete Iru" by Granrodeo	"Dead Stroke" by Ena Fujita	ONA
Baki Hanma	5	12	September 30, 2021	"Treasure Pleasure" by Granrodeo	"Unchained World" by Generations from Exile Tribe	ONA
Baki Hanma	6	27	July 26, 2023 — August 24, 2023	"The Beast" by Wagakki Band	"Wilder" by Upstart	ONA
Baki Hanma	6	27	July 26, 2023 — August 24, 2023	"Sarracenia" by Sky-Hi	"Salvia" by Be:First	ONA
Baki-Dou: The Invincible Samurai	7	25	February 26, 2026 — June 18, 2026	"Furuboko" by Wanima	"Mountain Top" by Novel Core	ONA
Baki-Dou: The Invincible Samurai	7	25	February 26, 2026 — June 18, 2026	"Musashi" by Chevon	"Katana" by Sandaime J Soul Brothers	ONA

=== Video games ===
There have been a few video games based on the series. A fighting game developed by Tomy was released for the PlayStation 2 as Grappler Baki: Baki Saikyō Retsuden (グラップラー刃牙 バキ最強列伝, Gurappurā Baki - Baki Saikyō Retsuden) in Japan in 2000 and as Fighting Fury in the United Kingdom during 2003. Baki the Grappler: Ultimate Championship was released for Android in 2017. A card game for web browsers called Typing Grappler Baki was created. Another browser game, Hanma Baki - Baki, was for Yahoo! Mobage. The fighting game Baki Hanma: Blood Arena came out on September 11, 2025. Yujiro Hanma appears as an unlockable character in the PlayStation 2 game, Garōden: Breakblow – Fist or Twist. He would also appear as a DLC character in the third season pass for Tekken 8 in early 2027.

=== Stage plays ===
The underground arena arc of Baki the Grappler was adapted into a play written and directed by Daisuke Tanaka, who previously adapted Sakigake!! Otokojuku, with Hideaki Okuzumi in charge of the fighting and action scenes. Titled Baki the Grappler Stage: Underground Arena Arc (刃牙 THE GRAPPLER STAGE ―地下闘技場編―), it ran at Shinjuku Face from December 4 to 8, 2024. The production starred Yugo Sato as Baki, Momoka Onishi as Kozue, Sho Higano as Katsumi and Haruto Sakuraba as Hanayama. Actual martial artists Taishin Kohiruimaki and Kozo Takeda played Shuumei Kanou and Doppo, respectively. A second play, titled Baki the Grappler Stage 2: The Most Sinister Death Row Convict Arc (刃牙 THE GRAPPLER STAGE2 ー最凶死刑囚編ー), ran at Shinjuku Face from July 23 to 28, 2026. Baki the Grappler Stage Gaiden: Retsu Kaio wa Isekai Tensei Shitemo Ikkō ni Kamawan (刃牙 THE GRAPPLER STAGE 外伝 烈海王は異世界転生しても一向にかまわんッッ), which adapts Sai Ihara and Eiji Mutsui's spinoff manga of the same name, will run at Owlspot Theatre in Tokyo from March 19 to 22, 2027. It will star Riku Noma, who is reprising his role as Kaio Retsu from the previous two plays.

== Reception ==
By May 2021, the various Baki series had over 85 million collected volumes in circulation; it had over 100 million copies in circulation by May 2024. The Scarface spin-off series had 3.5 million copies in print by February 2019.

Allen Divers and Jason Thompson, both writing for Anime News Network, briefly described the series as "very compelling" and a "demented fighting manga", respectively.

Anime News Network had four different writers review the first volume of the second manga series. Faye Hopper scored it the highest, four out of five, and wrote that she was captivated the entire read with its appeal lying in "its absurdity held up by its absolutely incredible artistry." Amy McNulty gave it a 2.5 rating and also praised Itagaki's art, but felt the character designs were not particularly memorable. She also wrote that the volume "succeeds in identifying the stakes, but it completely fails in anchoring the reader with characters to care about." Rebecca Silverman and Teresa Navarro both gave it a 2 and noted its status as a "set-up book," with each new character introduced in the same manner. Both Hopper and Silverman said that Baki reminded them of JoJo's Bizarre Adventure.

Reviewing the first 24 episodes of the 2001 anime, Mark Thomas of Mania Entertainment gave it a B− rating, stating that fans of shōnen and fight series would enjoy it, but others should look elsewhere. He felt it had plenty of good, realistic fight scenes, but fell short on the story. Explaining that despite a lot of story arcs, it ultimately feels like a setup for the second season. Thomas gave the same rating to the final 24 episodes, and "mildly recommended" the series. While he started to enjoy this set more thanks to its more action focus, he stated that not showing Baki's final fight with Yujiro, which was built up the entire show, really ruined it for him.

Baki influenced the appearance of the character Gai Tendo in the 1999 video game Buriki One. The 2012 comedy film Graffreeter Toki is based on the March 2011 play of the same name, which in turn was inspired by Baki the Grappler.

Sociologist Junko Kaneda interpreted Baki the Grappler as homoerotic and published an essay book about it titled Notes of a Girl Who Spent 30 Hours a Day for 300 Days Thinking "So Baki The Grappler Is BL, Right?" The essay was adapted into a live-action television series titled A Story of Grappler Baki and Me that was broadcast on Wowow in August 2021.
