= Aoyagi =

Aoyagi (written: 青柳／青栁, lit. 'Blue willow'; 青八木, lit. 'Eight blue trees') is a Japanese surname. Notable people with the surname include:

- Akiko Aoyagi (born 1950), Japanese-born American illustrator and recipe writer
- Atsuki Aoyagi (born 1999), Japanese professional wrestler
- Kōki Aoyagi (青柳 昴樹; born 1997), Japanese baseball player
- Kōyō Aoyagi (青柳 晃洋; born 1993), Japanese baseball player
- Masashi Aoyagi (青柳 政司; 1956–2022), Japanese professional wrestler and karateka
- Nobuo Aoyagi (青柳 信雄; 1903–1976), Japanese film director and producer
- Ruito Aoyagi (青柳 塁斗; born 1990), Japanese actor and singer
- Ryōko Aoyagi (青柳 涼子; 1978–2009), Japanese actress and singer
- Sho Aoyagi (青柳 翔; born 1985), Japanese actor
- Susumu Aoyagi (青柳 進; born 1968), Japanese baseball player
- Takashi Aoyagi (青柳 隆志; born 1961), Japanese literature scholar and voice actor
- Takuo Aoyagi (青柳 卓雄; 1936–2020), Japanese engineer and developer of pulse oximetry
- Yuma Aoyagi (青柳 優馬; born 1995), Japanese professional wrestler
- Yumiko Aoyagi (青柳 祐美子; born 1970), Japanese television writer

== See also ==
- Aoyagi Station, a railway station in Chino, Nagano Prefecture, Japan
- 9886 Aoyagi, a main-belt asteroid
