= Baki (TV series) =

American war comedy-drama TV series (1972–1983)

- Key Visual
- バキ
- Genre: Martial Arts
- Created by: Keisuke Itagaki
- Based on: Baki by Keisuke Itagaki
- Written by: Tatsuhiko Urahata
- Directed by: Toshiki Hirano
- Music by: Kenji Fujisawa
- Country of origin: Japan
- Original language: Japanese
- No. of seasons: 2
- No. of episodes: 39

Production
- Producers: Kei Watahiki; Yuki Yokoi
- Animators: TMS Entertainment; Double Eagle (#1–26)
- Production companies: TMS Entertainment; Baki Production Committee

Original release
- Network: Netflix
- Release: June 25, 2018 – June 4, 2020

Related
- Baki the Grappler; Baki Hanma

Baki is a 2018 original net animation series adapted from the manga of the same name written and illustrated by Keisuke Itagaki. It covers the second part of the Baki the Grappler manga and is directed by Toshiki Hirano at TMS Entertainment with character handled by Fujio Suzuki and scripts overseen by Tatsuhiko Urahata. It began streaming on Netflix on June 25, 2018, in Japan, and started streaming on December 18, 2018, outside Japan. The series then started airing on several Japanese television channels beginning with Tokyo MX on July 1. Its opening theme song is "Beastful" by Granrodeo and its ending theme "Resolve" is performed by Azusa Tadokoro with lyrics by Miho Karasawa. The first season focuses on five inmates who break out of prison from around the world and travel to Japan.

Netflix renewed the series for a second season on March 19, 2019. On March 5, 2020, it was announced that the main staff TMS Entertainment would be returning to produce the second season with the addition of a new character designer and art director. The 13 episode second season covering the "Great Chinese Challenge" and the Alai Jr. arcs was released exclusively on Netflix on June 4, 2020. Its opening theme is "Jounetsu wa Oboete Iru" performed by Granrodeo and its ending theme is "Dead Stroke" performed by Ena Fujita.

== Series overview ==
Season	Episodes	Original run	Musical themes	
Season	Episodes	Original run	Opening	Ending
1	26	June 25, 2018 — December 16, 2018	"Beastful" by Granrodeo	"Resolve" by Azusa Tadokoro
1	26	June 25, 2018 — December 16, 2018	"The Gong of Knockout" by Fear, and Loathing in Las Vegas	"BEAUTIFUL BEAST" by DEVIL NO ID
2	13	June 4, 2020	"Jōnetsu wa Oboete Iru" (情熱は覚えている) by Granrodeo	"Dead Stroke" by Ena Fujita

== Episodes ==
=== Season 1: Most Evil Death Row Convicts Saga (2018) ===
No.	Title	Original release date
1	"Synchronicity"; Transliteration: "Shinkuronishiti" (Japanese: シンクロニシティ)	June 25, 2018
Underground martial arts arena promoter Mitsunari Tokugawa warns champion Baki Hanma that five violent death row escapees from around the world are all heading for Tokyo.
2	"Dark Martial Arts"; Transliteration: "Kuro Kakutōgi" (Japanese: 黒格闘技)	July 2, 2018
While Baki Hanma easily subdues the thugs hired by delinquents from his own school, death row escapee Spec pays a visit to assess the champion's abilities.
3	"They're Finally Here!!"; Transliteration: "Kita! Kita!! Kita!!!" (Japanese: 来た！来た！！来た！！！)	July 9, 2018
Death row escapee Dorian barges into the Shinshinkai Dojo and starts a brutal attack on Katsumi Orochi. Then all convicts comes to the Underground Arena.
4	"The Battle Begins!!"; Transliteration: "Shitō Kaishi!!" (Japanese: 死闘開始!!)	July 16, 2018
With all five death row escapees and their opponents assembled inside the Underground Arena, Mitsunari Tokugawa officially declares the beginning of battle.
5	"Want Some More?"; Transliteration: "Mada Yaru Kai" (Japanese: まだやるかい)	July 23, 2018
While out with Kozue Matsumoto (girlfriend of the main character), Baki Hanma is almost ambushed by Spec, but he's spared a fight when Kaoru Hanayama suddenly appears to protect the couple from harm's way.
6	"Sergeant Katahira's Report"; Transliteration: "Katahira Junsa no Hōkoku-sho" (Japanese: 片平巡査の報告書)	July 30, 2018
Spec unleashes moves lethal enough to take out even the strongest of opponents in one strike, but Kaoru Hanayama counters with improbable moves of his own. Spec finally tastes defeat.
7	"A Formidable Team"; Transliteration: "Saikyō Taggu" (Japanese: 最強タッグ)	August 5, 2018
Ambushed by Hector Doyle while in class, Baki Hanma leads Doyle away from the classroom only to encounter Ryuukou Yanagi in disguise outside. Yanagi knocks Baki unconscious.
8	"A Match vs a True Fight"; Transliteration: "Shial to Honban" (Japanese: 試合と本番)	August 13, 2018
While Baki Hanma and his allies discuss the events that transpired at his school, Dorian appears, infiltrating Tokugawa's heavily guarded compound.
9	"Shaken Shinshinkai!!"; Transliteration: "Shinshinkai Gekishin!!" (Japanese: 神心会激震!!)	August 20, 2018
Kiyosumi Katou, known as one of the strongest fighters of Shinshinkai Karate, confronts Dorian deep inside his secret underground hideout.
10	"Air Duel"; Transliteration: "Kūchū Kessen" (Japanese: 空中決戦)	August 27, 2018
Boasting one million members nationwide, the Shinshinkai lures Dorian to an amusement park, where Katou's peer Atsushi Suedo immediately strikes.
11	"Tiger Killer"; Transliteration: "Tora Koroshi" (Japanese: 虎殺し)	September 3, 2018
As Dorian's past comes to light, Shinshinkai founder and "tiger killer" Doppo Orochi takes him on in an all-out karate versus kempo battle.
12	"Candy"; Transliteration: "Kyandi" (Japanese: キャンディ)	September 10, 2018
Doppo Orochi pummels the life out of terror-stricken Kaioh Dorian before bringing the equally injured Kiyosumi Katou over to administer the finishing blows. Dorian finally acknowledges that what is defeat as he wished.
13	"Mr. Oliva"; Transliteration: "Misutā Oriba" (Japanese: ミスターオリバ)	September 17, 2018
Kozue Matsumoto is kidnapped by Sikorsky, and then Biscuit Oliva arrives in Tokyo to capture the remaining convicts.
14	"Ungranted Freedom"; Transliteration: "Yurusa Renu Jiyū" (Japanese: 許されぬ自由)	September 24, 2018
Sikorsky lures Baki Hanma into battle with help from an unlikely source.
15	"Tremendous Muscle Power"; Transliteration: "Chō Kinryoku" (Japanese: 超筋力)	October 1, 2018
While searching the police database for clues, an unsuspecting Biscuit Oliva is ambushed by Hector Doyle, who shows up dressed as a female police officer.
16	"Slash"; Transliteration: "Zangeki" (Japanese: 斬撃)	October 8, 2018
Biscuit Oliva thinks he should get a black belt if he can score a point against every officer on the judo team, but Morio Sonoda resists giving him one. Then appears Kosho Shinogi who challenges Hector Doyle for a duel.
17	"Dad!"; Transliteration: "Oyaji~tsu!!" (Japanese: 親父ッ!!)	October 15, 2018
The deadly fight between Kosho Shinogi and Hector Doyle reaches its spectacular climax. Meanwhile, Yujiro pays a visit to an unsuspecting Baki and Kozue.
18	"Thanks"; Transliteration: "Arigatō" (Japanese: アリガトウ)	October 22, 2018
Known as the pinnacle master of Chinese martial arts, Kaioh Retsu displays his masterful use of weaponry against a fully armed Hector Doyle.
19	"Admission of Defeat"; Transliteration: "Shitatameru Kai?" (Japanese: 認めるかい？)	October 29, 2018
After setting off an explosion inside Shinshinkai's dojo, Hector Doyle is confronted by its founder, Doppo Orochi. Later Mitsunari Tokugawa pays a visit to Kunimatsu, a master of Ryuukou Yanagi.
20	"Saga"; Transliteration: "Sāga" (Japanese: SAGA)	November 4, 2018
Mitsunari Tokugawa learns of the Poison Hand: the ultimate killer move of the "Way of the Void" martial art form. Baki Hanma takes the next step in his relationship with Kozue Matsumoto.
21	"Punishment"; Transliteration: "Seisai" (Japanese: 制裁)	November 11, 2018
A newly invigorated Baki Hanma easily handles attacks from both Ryuukou Yanagi and Sikorsky, but before finishing them off, Baki makes an unusual move.
22	"Clash of the Alphas!"; Transliteration: "Chō o Taiketsu!" (Japanese: 超雄対決！)	November 18, 2018
Baki's half-brother Jack Hanma challenges Sikorsky at a local park, where a battle inside the most inconceivable of places goes down.
23	"The Real Attack"; Transliteration: "Hontō no Kōgeki" (Japanese: 本当の攻撃)	November 25, 2018
Sikorsky faces Gaia in the underground arena in front of an audience. Gaia's unorthodox fighting method slowly wears out the ruthless Russian killer who finally admits defeat and asked for mercy. On the other hand, Izou Motobe confronts Ryuukou Yanagi.
24	"Defeat"; Transliteration: "Haiboku" (Japanese: 敗北)	December 2, 2018
Ryuukou Yanagi tasted defeat. At the time, Baki Hanma slowly dying because of the poison from Yanagi. Mohammad Alai Jr appears for the first time and visits Yujiro Hanma.
25	"God and the Devil"; Transliteration: "Kami to Oni" (Japanese: 神と鬼)	December 9, 2018
Legendary world heavyweight boxing champion Mohammad Alai reflects on his tense encounter with a young Yujiro Hanma. As he reminisces, a flashback shows that Yujiro Hanma is against oppression and racism. Even though Mohammad Alai was physically weaker than Yujiro, he respected Alai very much for fighting for the weak and giving them hope. Meanwhile, Baki Hanma and Kozue Matsumoto visit Reiichi Ando and Yasha-Zaru Jr. After their return from the lair of Yasha-Zaru, Baki is abducted by Kaioh Retsu.
26	"The Centennial Tournament"; Transliteration: "Dà Lèitái Sài" (Japanese: 大擂台賽)	December 16, 2018
Kaioh Retsu pleads with his mentor, Kaioh Ryu, to grant a mortally poisoned Baki Hanma special entry into the great Chinese martial arts tournament.

=== Season 2: Great Ratai Tournament/Godlike Clash of the Kids Saga (2020) ===
No. overall	No. in season	Title	Original release date
27	1	"Begin! The Centennial Tournament"; Transliteration: "Kāimù! Dà Lèitái Sài" (Japanese: 開幕！大擂台賽)	June 4, 2020
Mohammad Ali Jr tests a battle-eager Yujiro Hanma. Even though he's been poisoned, Kaioh Retsu enters Baki Hanma into the Great Chinese Tournament in China.
28	2	"Turnaround"; Transliteration: "Uragaeri" (Japanese: 裏返り)	June 4, 2020
Mohammad Ali Jr's deadly speed makes quick work of his opponent, Kaioh Jo. A severely emaciated Baki Hanma faces Kaioh Ri, the greatest Poison Hand user in all of China.
29	3	"Revived!"; Transliteration: "Fukkatsu~tsu~tsu!!" (Japanese: 復活ッッ！！)	June 4, 2020
Kaioh Kaku is 121 years older than his opponent, but the legendary reigning champion doesn't hesitate to face Kaioh Samwan in the arena.
30	4	"Team Formed!"; Transliteration: "Chīmu Kessei!" (Japanese: チーム結成！)	June 4, 2020
Kaioh Chin and Japan's sole Kaioh, Jyaku, battle on the tournament floor. Meanwhile, Baki Hanma provokes Yujiro into fighting him offstage.
31	5	"Hand Pocket"; Transliteration: "Handopoketto" (Japanese: ハンドポケット)	June 4, 2020
Biscuit Oliva's sheer power is unrivaled, but Shobun Ron and his unconventional fighting stance are unbothered. It's brute strength versus iai kenpo.
32	6	"Excellennnnt!"; Transliteration: "Subarashii~tsu~tsu" (Japanese: スバラシイッッ)	June 4, 2020
A genius of Chinese kenpo, Kaioh Retsu is the superior fighter, but Kaioh Jyaku's dirty techniques and tactical prowess make him a formidable foe.
33	7	"Kaioh"; Transliteration: "Kaikō" (Japanese: 海皇)	June 4, 2020
Kaioh Kaku is the embodiment of Chinese Kenpo. Yujiro Hanma is known as the "Strongest Creature on Earth". A battle unlike any other begins.
34	8	"The Title of the Strongest"; Transliteration: "Saikyō no Shōgō" (Japanese: スバラシイッッ)	June 4, 2020
Yujiro Hanma pits his raw power against Kaioh Kaku's martial arts skills, which he's honed for over a century. The match's shocking outcome stuns everyone.
35	9	"The Master vs the Boxer"; Transliteration: "Tatsujin vs Bokusā" (Japanese: 達人VSボクサー)	June 4, 2020
Mohammad Ali Jr proposes to Kozue Matsumoto, who's dumbfounded. To prove he's a better man than Baki Hanma, Ali Jr challenges the elderly aikido master Goki Shibukawa and Doppo Orochi.
36	10	"Stand and Fight"	June 4, 2020
Mohammad Ali Jr continues testing his skill against notable fighters, but Baki's half-brother Jack Hanma is unlike any combatant he's faced before.
37	11	"Awakening"; Transliteration: "Kakusei" (Japanese: 覚醒)	June 4, 2020
Badly injured from his street fights, Mohammad Ali Jr returns to his hotel room. There his father, Alai Sr the greatest boxer of all time, challenges him to a match.
38	12	"Completion"; Transliteration: "Kansei" (Japanese: 完成)	June 4, 2020
A battle between the sons of two legendary fighters begins deep below Tokyo Dome. It's Baki Hanma versus Mohammad Ali Jr, and the winner is anyone's guess.
39	13	"Revenge Tokyo"	June 4, 2020
After Ryuukou Yanagi escapes from prison, Inspector Morio Sonoda attempts to locate the other death row inmates who wreaked havoc on Tokyo.
