= Baki the Grappler (2001 TV series) =

- グラップラー刃牙
- Genre: Martial Arts
- Created by: Keisuke Itagaki
- Based on: Baki the Grappler by Keisuke Itagaki
- Written by: Atsuhiro Tomioka
- Directed by: Hitoshi Nanba (#1–24); Katsuyoshi Yatabe (#25–48)
- Music by: Project Baki
- Country of origin: Japan
- Original language: Japanese
- No. of seasons: 2
- No. of episodes: 48

Production
- Producers: Hiroyoshi Ōkura; Kenjirō Kawando
- Animator: Group TAC
- Production company: Free-Will

Original release
- Network: TV Tokyo
- Release: January 8 – December 24, 2001

Related
- Baki; Baki Hanma

Baki the Grappler (Japanese: グラップラー刃牙, Hepburn: Gurappurā Baki) is a 2001 anime television series adapted from the manga of the same name written and illustrated by Keisuke Itagaki. It covers the first part of the Baki the Grappler manga and is produced by Free-Will and animated at Group TAC. It is the second anime adaptation of the manga, following a 45-minute original video animation (OVA) by Knack Productions that was released in 1994. The series aired from January 8, 2001, to December 24, 2001, on TV Tokyo and ran for 48 episodes across two seasons.

The series was licensed in North America by Funimation Entertainment, who released the series across 12 DVD volumes from June 14, 2005, to February 27, 2007. Their English dub aired on the Funimation Channel beginning on June 19, 2006.

== Series overview ==
Season	Season title	Episodes	Original run	Musical themes	
Season	Season title	Episodes	Original run	Opening	Ending
1	Baki the Grappler	24	January 8, 2001 — June 25, 2001	"I Believe" (哀 Believe) by Ryoko Aoyagi (Note: "I Believe" and "All Alone" were replaced by the song "Child Prey" by Dir En Grey in international releases.)	"Reborn" by Ryoko Aoyagi
2	Baki the Grappler: Maximum Tournament	24	July 23, 2001 — December 24, 2001	"All Alone" by Ryoko Aoyagi	"Loved..." by Ryoko Aoyagi

== Episode list ==
=== Season 1: Kid Saga/Underground Arena Saga (2001) ===
No.	Funimation dub title/Translated title Original Japanese title	Original release date
1	"Stirrings of Destiny / Moving Towards Destiny"; Transliteration: "Shukumei e no Taidou" (Japanese: 宿命への胎動)	January 8, 2001
Baki Hanma fights a gang of 100 thugs and he manages to defeat 37 people. Afterward, he is walked home by Detective Kido and his partner, who watched the fight. Baki then trains and thinks about what he should do to get stronger. Meanwhile, Kuriyagawa, the man who hired the thugs to fight Baki in order to test his strength, pays the gang's leader named Kitazawa. Also, Baki watches a sparring match between Yuri Chakovsky, the international welterweight boxing champion, and Dinoy, Thailand's Muay Thai champion.
2	"Those Who Squirm / The Ones that Squirm"; Transliteration: "Ugomeku Mono-Tachi" (Japanese: 蠢く者たち)	January 15, 2001
Baki spars with boxing champion named Yuri Chakovsky. Meanwhile, Kuriyagawa meets with Kaoru Hanayama, a gangster and renowned brawler, to set up a fight with Baki.
3	"The Beast of Yasha Crag / The Monster of Yasha Cave"; Transliteration: "Yasha Iwa no Majuu" (Japanese: 夜叉岩の魔獣)	January 22, 2001
Baki meets his friend Reiichi Ando in the woods and stays with him. While there, Baki adopts some of Ando's training techniques, and he camps alone on Yasha Rock, hoping to fight with the Yasha Ape.
4	"The Fang and the Tears / The Fang and Tears"; Transliteration: "Kiba to Kizuna" (Japanese: 牙と絆)	January 29, 2001
Baki Hanma fights a rematch with the Yasha Ape. After a very hard fight, Baki eventually defeat the giant monster. Later he and Yasha Ape becomes friends and Yasha Ape gives Baki his fang.
5	"A Warrior's Heart"; Transliteration: "Senshi no Kokoro" (Japanese: 戦士の心)	February 5, 2001
After returning home, Baki learns that Yuri will be fighting for the heavyweight title, so he visits Yuri at his gym. Meanwhile, Kuriyagawa tells Hanayama that he can't fight Baki until Baki has fought Yuri, but Hanayama has other plans. Before Yuri's title fight, he is attacked by Hanayama who defeats him and destroys his hand.
6	"Spirit / A Man's Stand"; Transliteration: "Kyoukaku Tachi" (Japanese: 侠客立ち)	February 12, 2001
After being knocked down by Baki, Hanayama flies into a rage in his office. Afterward, he visits his sick mother in the hospital. Also, Baki visits Yuri and his sister, Nina in the hospital before his rematch with Hanayama.
7	"Gripper / Gripping Attack"; Transliteration: "Nigiri Geki!" (Japanese: 握撃!)	February 19, 2001
Baki and Hanayama continue to fight, and Hanayama's tattoo is explained.
8	"Demon"; Transliteration: "Oni" (Japanese: 鬼)	February 26, 2001
Baki's father, Yujiro Hanma, shows up after Baki's fight with Kaoru Hanayama. After the story of how Yujiro met Baki's mother is told, Yujiro and Hanayama fight.
9	"The Division / Parting"; Transliteration: "Ketsubetsu" (Japanese: 訣別)	March 5, 2001
Baki explains to his mother why he fights, visits Hanayama in the hospital, and trains. After a brief encounter with Yujiro, who killed the Yasha Ape, which made Baki angry since Yasha was Baki's friend after their fight, they decide that Baki and Yujiro will fight in one month. Baki then meets Captain Gerry Strydum, who tells him of a mercenary group in Hokkaido, and Baki decides to go there to defeat them.
10	"Battlefield"; Transliteration: "Senjou" (Japanese: 戦場)	March 12, 2001
Captured by the mercenaries as soon as he parachutes in, Baki must free himself and fight his way out against Nomura's jungle warfare team (Copperhead, Kuraishi, and the Chiba twin brothers, Sanada and Chiba). Meanwhile, an old friend warns Strydum of Gaia's fighting ability.
11	"Gaia"; Transliteration: "GAIA" (Japanese: ガイア)	March 19, 2001
Baki fights Gaia (an alter ego of Nomura).
12	"Bite Marks"; Transliteration: "Kami Ato" (Japanese: 噛み跡)	March 26, 2001
Yujiro Hanma breaks into the Prime Minister's office to prove a point; Baki Hanma fights the swordsman Kurokawa; Yujiro forces the archer Kanemoto to shoot an arrow at him; Baki visits his mother after she is rejected by Yujiro.
13	"The Midnight Hour / Challenge"; Transliteration: "Idomu!" (Japanese: 挑む!)	April 2, 2001
All of Baki's friends show up to watch his fight with Yujiro and to help him warm up; meanwhile, Yujiro fights Gaia. Also, Hanayama opens up to Baki about his mother.
14	"Lullaby / After Having a Dream"; Transliteration: "Yume wo Mita ato" (Japanese: 夢を見たあと)	April 9, 2001
Baki fights his own father, Yujiro.
15	"Reflections / Slave"; Transliteration: "Aitsu" (Japanese: 彼奴)	April 16, 2001
A recap episode. Detective Kido reflects upon his experiences with Baki Hanma, and Hitoshi Kuriyagawa tells Kido about Baki's relationship with his mother and his fight with Yujiro.
16	"Coming Home / Road to the Sacred Land"; Transliteration: "Seichi e no Michi" (Japanese: 聖地への道)	April 23, 2001
Antonio Igari, a pro wrestler, tells Mitsunari Tokugawa, an old man who runs an underground fighting circuit, about Baki Hanma and his recent global travels. In the narrative, Baki is seen training and fighting, and, while in Brazil, he visits a fighting master named Dickson. Learning of the circuit, Baki returns to Japan to meet with Tokugawa, and he fights Tokugawa's bodyguards to earn a chance to enter the circuit.
17	"Champion / The Gathering"; Transliteration: "Shuuketsu" (Japanese: 集結)	April 30, 2001
Flash forward three years: Baki Hanma is now the champion of the underground arena. Mitsunari Tokugawa meets with Doppo Orochi, a great Shinshinkai karate fighter, and asks him to enter his son in the arena. Doppo finds Kiyosumi Katou, a former student, at his dojo beating up his fighters, and he introduces Katou to the arena. Baki trains for a fight at the boarding house where he is staying, where Kozue Matsumoto, the daughter of the woman who owns the house, has a crush on him.
18	"The Cord-Cutter / The Chord-Cutter"; Transliteration: "Himo Giri" (Japanese: 紐切り)	May 7, 2001
Baki Hanma fights Kousho Shinogi, a master of Cord-Cut Karate.
19	"The Right To Fight / Opponent"; Transliteration: "Taisen Sha" (Japanese: 対戦者)	May 14, 2001
Kiyosumi Katou spars with the fighters in Doppo Orochi's dojo; Kozue Matsumoto interferes with some bullies that are bothering Baki Hanma, which causes problems for her later; several fighters petition Mitsunari Tokugawa to be Baki's next opponent; Baki trains with Izou Motobe.
20	"An Honorable Loss"; Transliteration: "Meiyo aru Haiboku" (Japanese: 名誉ある敗北)	May 21, 2001
Baki fights Mount Toba, a professional wrestler.
21	"An Unlikely Challenger / Killer Instinct"; Transliteration: "Sasshou Honnou" (Japanese: 殺傷本能)	May 28, 2001
Yujiro Hanma shows up after Baki's fight and knocks him out, and Doppo Orochi challenges Yujiro to a fight. After watching Doppo spar with his students, Baki spars with him. Yujiro starts a fight with a group of boxers at their gym, and he fights with Izou Motobe and Baki's next opponent is revealed.
22	"Head-On Collision"; Transliteration: "Ryouyuu Gekitotsu!" (Japanese: 両雄激突!)	June 4, 2001
Dr. Shinogi Kureha reveals to his brother, Kousho Shinogi, the Cord-Cutter, why he is fighting Baki Hanma; Doppo Orochi and Yujiro Hanma fight.
23	"Medical Miracle / Fighting God, Satan!"; Transliteration: "Bushin, Shinigami" (Japanese: 武神、死神)	June 18, 2001
The fight between Doppo Orochi and Yujiro Hanma continues; after Dr. Shinogi Kureha performs a medical miracle, he demonstrates his physical abilities to the crowd; one of Kureha's former patients visits Baki.
24	"The King's Ransom / The Devil's Payback"; Transliteration: "Akuma no Houshuu" (Japanese: 悪魔の報酬)	June 25, 2001
Baki fights Dr. Shinogi Kureha.

=== Season 2: Maximum Tournament Saga (2001) ===
No. overall	No. in season	Funimation dub title/Translated title Original Japanese title	Original release date
25	1	"The Opening / Start"; Transliteration: "Hajime! Kaishi!" (Japanese: 開始!)	July 23, 2001
Mitsunari Tokugawa announces his plans for a world martial arts tournament, and fighters from around the world gather for it. In the first fight of round one in the A-Block, Baki Hanma fights Artemis Regan, a professional wrestler; in the second fight of round one in the A-Block, Vale Tudo master Zulu fights Muay Thai master Dentoranee Jitpika.
26	2	"Reverse / Super A-Class Reserver"; Transliteration: "Chou A kyuu RIZAABAA" (Japanese: 超A級リザーバー)	July 30, 2001
In the third A-Block match of round one, heavyweight kickboxing champion Rob Robinson takes on the professional wrestler Antonio Igari; in the fourth A-Block match of round one, Izou Motobe fights the grand sumo Kinryuuzan; in the first B-Block match of round one, the Sambo master Sergei Taktaroff fights Kaioh Retsu, a master of Chinese Kenpo; in the second B-Block match of round one, Kiyosumi Katou fights the son of the Yasha-Zaru - Yasha-Zaru Jr.
27	3	"Darkness from Light / The Ultimate Goal"; Transliteration: "FAINARUTAAGETTO" (Japanese: ファイナルターゲット)	August 6, 2001
Baki Hanma saves the Yasha-Zaru Jr. from Katsumi Orochi; in the third B-Block match of round one, Kaoru Hanayama fights the Japanese Kenpo master Bunnoshin Inagi; in the fourth B-Block match of round one, Roland Gustaf, a catch-as-catch-can wrestler, fights Orochi Katsumi.
28	4	"The King Returns / Here comes the King"; Transliteration: "OUGA Kourin" (Japanese: オーガ降臨)	August 13, 2001
Yujiro Hanma arrives and enters his protégé Yuu Amanai in the tournament; in the first C-Block match of round one, heavyweight boxing world champion Ian McGregor fights Taekwondo master Mouko Li; in the second C-Block match of round one, biker gang leader Chiharu Shiba fights judo master Kohei Hatanaka; in the third C-Block match of round one, Shorinji Kenpo master Kengo Misaki fights pro wrestler Mike Queen.
29	5	"User / The Right to Fight Him"; Transliteration: "YATSU to Touru Kenri" (Japanese: ヤツと闘る権利)	August 20, 2001
Brazilian Jujutsu master Sergio Silva faces pit-fighter Jack Hammer in the fourth C-Block match of round one; Yujiro Hanma tries to fight Hammer, but Baki intervenes; shoot wrestler Minoru Yamamoto faces Yuu Amanai in the first D-Block match of round one.
30	6	"The Tigerslayer Returns / The Professionals"; Transliteration: "Tatsujin" (Japanese: 達人)	August 27, 2001
Richard Filth, a bouncer, faces Doppo Orochi in the second D-Block match of round one; Roger Harlon, an amateur wrestler, faces the jujutsu master Gouki Shibukawa in the third D-Block match of round one; Kureha Shinogi faces Kousho Shinogi in the fourth D-Block match of round one.
31	7	"Fighting the Past / The Surpasser"; Transliteration: "Koeru Beki Mono" (Japanese: 超えるべき者)	September 3, 2001
The fourth D-Block match of round one continues as Kureha Shinogi and Kousho Shinogi continue to fight. Baki faces Zulu in the first A-Block match of round two.
32	8	"Eras End / The Reason Why He Can't Lose"; Transliteration: "Makerarenu Riyuu" (Japanese: 負けられぬ理由)	September 10, 2001
In the second A-Block match of round two, Kanji Igari faces Kinryuzan; in the first B-Block match of round two, Kaioh Retsu faces Mount Toba.
33	9	"Measure of a Man / The Warrior VS. The Chivalrous"; Transliteration: "Takehito tai Kyoukaku" (Japanese: 武人対侠客)	September 17, 2001
In the second B-Block match of round two, Kaoru Hanayama faces Katsumi Orochi.
34	10	"Robe of Death / The Fighter"; Transliteration: "FAITEINGUKIZZU" (Japanese: ファイティングキッズ)	September 24, 2001
In the first C-Block match of round two, Chiharu Shiba faces Ian McGregor.
35	11	"The Chained Patriot / The Fang"; Transliteration: "Kiba" (Japanese: 牙)	October 1, 2001
Andre Anov Garland, the last reserver, is introduced when it is deemed that Chiharu Shiba is in no condition to fight in the next round; in the second C-Block match of round two, Jack Hammer faces Kengo Misaki.
36	12	"Survivor / Extreme! Orochi Ryu"; Transliteration: "Kyuukyoku! Guchiryuu" (Japanese: 究極! 愚地流)	October 8, 2001
In the first D-Block match of round two, Doppo Orochi faces Amanai Yuu; Baki Hanma takes Kozue Matsumoto to the site of his mother's death.
37	13	"Misdirection / All Out!"; Transliteration: "Soroi Fumi" (Japanese: 揃い踏み)	October 15, 2001
Yujiro Hanma fights against all of the tournament losers; in the second D-Block match of round two, Gouki Shibukawa faces Shinogi Kousho.
38	14	"Deception / Pro Wrestling Show"; Transliteration: "PURORESU Shoubu!" (Japanese: プロレス勝負!)	October 22, 2001
Igari begs Baki to let him win, and they fight in the first match of the quarter-finals.
39	15	"The Ace and the Serpent / Fate! Sonic Fists"; Transliteration: "Hiun! Onsoku Kobushi" (Japanese: 悲運! 音速拳)	October 29, 2001
In the second fight of the quarter-finals, Katsumi Orochi faces Retsu Kaioh; Andre Anov Garland fights an anaconda to make things fair, since he hasn't fought in the tournament yet, and then he faces Jack Hammer in the third fight of the quarter-finals.
40	16	"How to Build a Better Monster / Men Who Threw Away their Future"; Transliteration: "Ashita wo Suteta Otoko" (Japanese: 明日を捨てた男)	November 5, 2001
Andre Anov Garland and Jack Hammer continue to fight in the third match of the quarter-finals. Also, Hammer's training history is revealed.
41	17	"Doppo vs Shibukawa / Doppo Orochi, Being Active!"; Transliteration: "Doppo, Mau!" (Japanese: 独歩、舞う!)	November 12, 2001
Gouki Shibukawa faces Doppo Orochi in the fourth match of the quarter-finals.
42	18	"Warriors Legacy / The Successor"; Transliteration: "Tsugu Mono" (Japanese: 継ぐ者)	November 19, 2001
Baki fights Retsu Kaioh in the first match of the semi-finals.
43	19	"Monster / Tatsujin VS. Monster"; Transliteration: "Tatsujin VS Kaibutsu" (Japanese: 達人VS怪物)	November 26, 2001
In the second match of the semi-finals, Gouki Shibukawa faces Jack Hammer.
44	20	"The Finals / Fight for Victory"; Transliteration: "Kesshou (FAINARU)" (Japanese: 決勝（ファイナル）)	December 3, 2001
Baki and Jack think about the training and hardships they've endured to reach their current level of ability.
45	21	"Blood Battle / Secret War in Vietnam"; Transliteration: "SHIIKURETTOUOU" (Japanese: シークレットウォー)	December 10, 2001
Baki faces Jack in the final match of the tournament. Also, in a flashback Yujiro Hanma meets Jack's mother in Vietnam.
46	22	"Soldiers Misfortune / The Evolved Genius"; Transliteration: "Shinka Suru Tensai" (Japanese: 進化する天才)	December 17, 2001
Baki and Jack continue to fight in the final match. In the continuing flashback to Vietnam, Yujiro Hanma breaks into an American base and terrorizes the soldiers; later, Jack is born.
47	23	"Final Strike / Resolution"; Transliteration: "Kecchaku" (Japanese: 決着)	December 24, 2001
Baki and Jack continue to fight in the finals as Jack's body breaks down.
48	24	"Public Enemy Zero / Encounter"; Transliteration: "Kaikou" (Japanese: 邂逅)	December 24, 2001
In a flashback, the United States government sends its special forces to South America to kill a young Yujiro Hanma.

== Home media ==
Funimation Productions (USA, Region 1/A)
Vol.	Episodes	Release date	Ref.
1	1-4	June 14, 2005	
2	5-8	August 9, 2005	
3	9-12	October 4, 2005	
4	13-16	November 29, 2005	
5	17-20	January 24, 2006	
6	21-24	March 21, 2006	
7	25-28	May 16, 2006	
8	29-32	July 11, 2006	
9	33-36	September 26, 2006	
10	37-40	November 14, 2006	
11	41-44	January 2, 2007	
12	45-48	February 27, 2007	
