= Baki Hanma (TV series) =

- Key visual
- 範馬刃牙
- Genre: Martial Arts
- Created by: Keisuke Itagaki
- Based on: Baki Hanma by Keisuke Itagaki
- Written by: Tatsuhiko Urahata
- Directed by: Toshiki Hirano
- Music by: Kenji Fujisawa
- Country of origin: Japan
- Original language: Japanese
- No. of seasons: 2
- No. of episodes: 39

Production
- Producers: Kei Watahiki; Yuki Yokoi
- Animator: TMS Entertainment
- Production companies: TMS Entertainment; Baki Production Committee

Original release
- Network: Netflix
- Release: September 30, 2021 – August 24, 2023

Related
- Baki the Grappler; Baki

Baki Hanma, also known as Son of Ogre: Baki Hanma, is a 2021 original net animation series adapted from the manga of the same name written and illustrated by Keisuke Itagaki. It covers the third part of the Baki the Grappler manga and is directed by Toshiki Hirano at TMS Entertainment. On September 21, 2020, it was announced Baki Hanma will be adapted as the third series and the sequel to the second season of the Netflix series. The 12-episode series was released on September 30, 2021, on Netflix. A second season was announced on March 24, 2022, and was released in two cours: the first half on July 26, 2023, and the last half on August 24.

For episodes 1–12, the first opening theme is "Treasure Pleasure" performed by Granrodeo while the first ending theme is "Unchained World" performed by Generations from Exile Tribe. The second season has two openings and two endings. The "Tale of Pickle Saga" opening theme is "The Beast" by Wagakki Band, while Upstart performs its closing theme "Wilder". The "Father VS Son Saga" opening is "Sarracenia" by Sky-Hi, while Be:First performs its closing theme "Salvia".

== Series overview ==
Season	Episodes	Original run	Musical themes	
Season	Episodes	Original run	Opening	Ending
1	12	September 30, 2021	"Treasure Pleasure" by Granrodeo	"Unchained World" by Generations from Exile Tribe
2	27	July 26, 2023 — August 24, 2023	"The Beast" by Wagakki Band	"Wilder" by Upstart
2	27	July 26, 2023 — August 24, 2023	"Sarracenia" by Sky-Hi	"Salvia" by Be:First

== Episode list ==
=== Season 1: Combat Shadow Fighting Saga/Great Prison Battle Saga (2021) ===
No.	Title	Directed by (Note: Information is taken from the ending credits of each episode.)	Written by	Storyboard by	Original release date
1	"The World's Strongest Senior"; Transliteration: "Sekai Ichi no Kōkōsei" (Japanese: 世界一の高校生)	Keiya Saitō	Tatsuhiko Urahata	Keiya Saitō	September 30, 2021
2	"Mixed species' martial arts" Transliteration: "I "Shu" Kakutōgi" (Japanese: 異"種"格闘技)	Masatoshi Hakata	Tatsuhiko Urahata	Masatoshi Hakata	September 30, 2021
3	"Prison and Hell"; Transliteration: "Kangoku to Jigoku" (Japanese: 監獄と地獄)	Daisuke Shimamura	Tatsuhiko Urahata	Keiya Saitō	September 30, 2021
4	"The Second"; Transliteration: "Sekan" (Japanese: 2(セカン))	Yūsuke Onoda	Ken'ichi Yamada	Shinobu Tagashira	September 30, 2021
5	"Terrible Triplets"; Transliteration: "Kyōfu no Mitsugo" (Japanese: 恐怖の三つ子)	Kazuomi Koga	Tatsuhiko Urahata	Masatoshi Hakata	September 30, 2021
6	"Man of the Sea"; Transliteration: "Umi no Zoku" (Japanese: 海の賊)	Keiya Saitō	Ken'ichi Yamada	Keiya Saitō	September 30, 2021
7	"Hyper male and Hyper male" Transliteration: "Chōyū to Chōyū" (Japanese: 超雄と超雄)	Hitoyuki Matsui	Tatsuhiko Urahata	Shinobu Tagashira	September 30, 2021
8	"Gilberto Style"; Transliteration: "Jiruberuto Sutairu" (Japanese: ジルベルトスタイル)	Daisuke Shimamura	Atsuo Ishino	Masatoshi Hakata	September 30, 2021
9	"Decision Time"; Transliteration: "Ketchaku no Toki" (Japanese: 決着の刻)	Yūsuke Onoda	Ken'ichi Yamada	Keiya Saitō	September 30, 2021
10	"Can't you laugh?" Transliteration: "Waraenē no Kai!?" (Japanese: 笑えねぇのかい！？)	Keiya Saitō	Tatsuhiko Urahata	Masatoshi Hakata	September 30, 2021
11	"The Prison Guard talks about it" Transliteration: "Keimukan wa Kataru" (Japanese: 刑務官は語る)	Hitoyuki Matsui	Atsuo Ishino	Keiya Saitō	September 30, 2021
12	"Beyond the Brawn"; Transliteration: "Kinniku no Mukōgawa" (Japanese: 筋肉の向こう側)	Keiya Saitō	Tatsuhiko Urahata	Toshiki Hirano	September 30, 2021

=== Season 2: Pickle Wars Saga/The Father VS Son Saga (2023) ===
No. overall	No. in season	Title	Directed by	Written by	Storyboard by	Original release date
Pickle Wars Saga
13	1	"New History of Mankind"; Transliteration: "Shinsetsu jinrui-shi" (Japanese: 新説人類史)	Keiya Saitō	Toshiki Hirano	Toshiki Hirano	July 26, 2023
14	2	"Completely Surrounded"; Transliteration: "Kanzen hōi" (Japanese: 完全包囲)	Yukio Kuroda	Tatsuhiko Urahata	Keiya Saitō	July 26, 2023
15	3	"Nature Power VS Battle Power"; Transliteration: "Shizen-ryoku VS buryoku" (Japanese: 自然力VS武力)	Unknown	Unknown	TBA	July 26, 2023
16	4	"Pickle's Tears"; Transliteration: "Pikuru no namida" (Japanese: ピクルの涙)	Unknown	Unknown	TBA	July 26, 2023
17	5	"Just Want to See You"; Transliteration: "Tada aitakute" (Japanese: ただ会いたくて)	Unknown	Unknown	TBA	July 26, 2023
18	6	"Beyond the Sound Barrier"; Transliteration: "Onsoku no mukō-gawa" (Japanese: 音速の向こう側)	Unknown	Unknown	TBA	July 26, 2023
19	7	"Moment of the Heat"; Transliteration: "Shakunetsu no toki" (Japanese: 灼熱の時)	Unknown	Unknown	TBA	July 26, 2023
20	8	"Praying Savage"; Transliteration: "Inoru yasei" (Japanese: 祈る野生)	Unknown	Unknown	TBA	July 26, 2023
21	9	"Devouring Each Other"; Transliteration: "Kurai Ai" (Japanese: 喰らい合い)	Unknown	Unknown	TBA	July 26, 2023
22	10	"Food Reserve"; Transliteration: "Hayanie" (Japanese: 早贄)	Unknown	Unknown	TBA	July 26, 2023
23	11	"The Weak Eats the Mighty"; Transliteration: "Tsuyo Nikujakushoku" (Japanese: 強肉弱食)	Unknown	Unknown	TBA	July 26, 2023
24	12	"Final Form"; Transliteration: "Saishū keitai" (Japanese: 最終形態)	Unknown	Unknown	TBA	July 26, 2023
25	13	"Unwritten Rule of the Fight"; Transliteration: "Tatakai no fubunritsu (okite)" (Japanese: 闘いの不文律(おきて))	Unknown	Unknown	TBA	July 26, 2023
The Father VS Son Saga
26	14	"Dying for Love"; Transliteration: "Koi ni junjiru" (Japanese: 恋に殉じる)	Unknown	Unknown	TBA	August 24, 2023
27	15	"Feeling the Beginning"; Transliteration: "Hajimari no yokan" (Japanese: 始まりの予感)	Unknown	Unknown	TBA	August 24, 2023
28	16	"New Horizon"; Transliteration: "Aratanaru kyōch" (Japanese: 新たなる境地)	Unknown	Unknown	TBA	August 24, 2023
29	17	"Legendary Promoter"; Transliteration: "Densetsu no kōgyō-shi (puromōtā)" (Japanese: 伝説の興行師（プロモーター）)	Unknown	Unknown	TBA	August 24, 2023
30	18	"Turning the Table"; Transliteration: "Chabudai-gaeshi" (Japanese: ちゃぶ台返し)	Unknown	Unknown	TBA	August 24, 2023
31	19	"God of Boxing"; Transliteration: "Kentō (bokushingu) no kami" (Japanese: 拳闘（ボクシング）の神)	Unknown	Unknown	TBA	August 24, 2023
32	20	"Their Own Way"; Transliteration: "Sorezore no ryūgi" (Japanese: それぞれの流儀)	Unknown	Unknown	TBA	August 24, 2023
33	21	"Father & Son Dining"; Transliteration: "Oyako no bansan" (Japanese: 親子の晩餐)	Unknown	Unknown	TBA	August 24, 2023
34	22	"The Biggest Father-Son Fight in History"; Transliteration: "Shijō saikyō no oyakogenka" (Japanese: 史上最強の親子喧嘩)	Unknown	Unknown	TBA	August 24, 2023
35	23	"Urban Legend"; Transliteration: "Toshi densetsu" (Japanese: 都市伝説)	Unknown	Unknown	TBA	August 24, 2023
36	24	"Tears Swelling"; Transliteration: "Komiageru namida" (Japanese: こみ上げる涙)	Unknown	Unknown	TBA	August 24, 2023
37	25	"Son, Father and..." Transliteration: "Musuko, chichi, soshite..." (Japanese: 息子、父、そして・・・)	Unknown	Unknown	TBA	August 24, 2023
38	26	"Dress"; Transliteration: "Doresu" (Japanese: ドレス)	Unknown	Unknown	TBA	August 24, 2023
39	27	"Taste of Dad"; Transliteration: "Oyaji no aji" (Japanese: 親父の味)	Unknown	Unknown	TBA	August 24, 2023
