= Naoki Saito =

Japanese illustrator, manga artist, and YouTuber

- さいとうなおき
- Born: Naoki Saito (齋藤 直葵); November 13, 1982 (age 43); Yamagata Prefecture, Japan
- Education: Tama Art University
- Occupations: Illustrator; manga artist; YouTuber
- Years active: 2001–present

YouTube information
- Channels: Naoki Saito Illust Channel (terminated); Naoki Saito Illust Channel 2
- Years active: 2019–present
- Genre: Educational
- Subscribers: 840 thousand
- Views: 88.1 million
- Last updated: September 8, 2026

Naoki Saito (さいとうなおき, Saitō Naoki; born November 13, 1982) is a Japanese illustrator, manga artist, and YouTuber. He is a regular contributing artist for the Duel Masters Trading Card Game, the Pokémon Trading Card Game, and Hatsune Miku merchandise. He is also the main illustrator and character designer for the game Dragalia Lost. As a manga artist, he wrote and illustrated Baki Domoe from 2010 to 2014. In addition, Saito runs a YouTube channel offering advice on how to improve artwork and published several books based on its content.

== Career ==
Saito debuted professionally at the age of 19, drawing artwork for the Duel Masters Trading Card Game. He is a regular contributing illustrator for the Pokémon Trading Card Game and the main illustrator for Dragalia Lost. From 2010 to 2014, he wrote and illustrated Baki Domoe, a comedy spin-off of Baki the Grappler. Baki Domoe was first launched on the Weekly Shōnen Champion's website, but after it shut down, it was published irregularly in the magazine before being moved to Bessatsu Shōnen Champion.

In 2017, Saito designed a Hatsune Miku figure, which was also re-released in 2019. He provided the illustrations for collaboration merchandise between Monster Hunter Frontier and Hatsune Miku, celebrating the 10th anniversary of both franchises. Saito provided the character design for the manga series Suginami Tōbatsu Kōmuin, which began serialization in Shōnen Jump+ in 2018.

In 2019, Saito became one of the contributing character designers for the mobile app game 47 Heroines. He released a collaboration illustration between Hatsune and Digimon Adventure to celebrate the latter franchise's 20th anniversary. Later that year, Saito created a YouTube channel, where he provided advice and instructional videos on drawing. As of March 2023, he had at least 1.3 million subscribers on his YouTube channel. In October 2019, he provided illustrations for Hatsune Miku mug cups that were sold in Sega arcade machines.

In 2021, Saito designed a figure featuring N and Zorua from Pokémon Black and White, as well as Leon and Charizard from Pokémon Sword and Shield. In the same year, Saito released his first advice book, Umaku Kaku no Kinshi: Tsurakunai Irasuto Jōtatsu-hō, on March 22, with contents based on his YouTube channel. This was followed by his second book, Saitō Naoki no Mottainai! Irasuto Tensaku Kōza. In the same year, Saito also announced he would be selling NFT art, with one of his works selling for 13.69 ETH (equivalent to ¥6 million).

In March 2023, Saito's YouTube channel was permanently banned, causing him to migrate to his second YouTube channel, Naoki Saito 2. The reason for the ban is unknown, but Saito has stated the possibility that a fan submission uploaded to his associated Google Drive account may have been considered sexually inappropriate by Google, which in turn banned his entire Google account.

== Personal life ==
Saito attended and graduated from Tama Art University, where he majored in graphic design.

== Works ==
=== Manga ===
Year	Title	Magazine	Notes
2010	Baki Domoe (バキどもえ)	Weekly Shōnen Champion; Bessatsu Shōnen Champion	Spin-off of Baki the Grappler
2018	Suginami Tōbatsu Kōmuin (スギナミ討伐公務員)	Shōnen Jump+	Character design

=== Other publications ===
Year	Title	Publisher	ISBN
2021	Umaku Kaku no Kinshi: Tsurakunai Irasuto Jōtatsu-hō (うまく描くの禁止-ツラくないイラスト上達法-) (lit. Forbidden Techniques of Drawing Well: How to Improve Rough Illustrations)	Pie International	ISBN 978-4756254191
2021	Saitō Naoki no Mottainai! Irasuto Tensaku Kōza (さいとうなおきのもったいない!イラスト添削講座) (lit. Too Good to Go to Waste! Illustration Correction Course from Naoki Saito)	Kadokawa Shoten	ISBN 978-4046053770
