= Pater Sato =

Japanese artist (1945–1994)

Pater Sato (ペーター 佐藤, Pētā Satō, 1945–1994) was a Japanese artist who created airbrush art for magazines. His birth name was Yoshinori Sato. A selection of Sato's work is on display and for sale at the Pater Sato shop in Harajuku.
