= Ena Fujita =

Japanese musician and model (born 1990)

- Also known as: Enamel (エナメル, Enameru), Tiramisu (ティラミス), MC Bikini (MCビキニ)
- Born: July 7, 1990 (age 36); Kitakyushu, Japan
- Genres: Rock, pop
- Occupations: Musician, singer-songwriter, gravure idol
- Instruments: Vocals, guitar
- Years active: 2006–present
- Labels: Go! Go!, Spacey, King, Waiwai, JPU (EU)
- Website: fujitaena.com

Ena Fujita (Japanese: 藤田恵名, Hepburn: Fujita Ena; born July 7, 1990) is a Japanese musician, singer-songwriter and gravure idol. Due to her two careers she has dubbed herself a "singer-songradol" (シンガーソングラドル, shingāsonguradoru), a portmanteau of "singer-songwriter" and "gradol", an abbreviation of "gravure idol". As a musician she is known for wearing bikinis onstage and for provocative promotional material.

== Early life and influences ==
Ena Fujita was born in Kitakyushu, Fukuoka Prefecture on July 7, 1990. As a child she was inspired to become a singer after performing a Sailor Moon song in front of her family. In October 2005, she won a singing contest in junior high school. As a child she was a fan of pop idols such as Aya Matsuura and Speed. But when she entered the music business she felt it was disingenuous to sing songs that other people wrote and that did not resonate with her, so she vowed to write her own lyrics. When she started playing guitar around 2014, she became more interested in rock music like Number Girl and The Blue Hearts. This was a result of recommendations by her frequent collaborator, Ga-ko Tabuchi.

== Career ==
=== Early work (2006–2015) ===
In June 2006, Fujita started attending the Vanz Entertainment entertainment school in Fukuoka. Her song "Karen" (カレン) was included on the January 2008 omnibus album Vanz Variety Vol. 1. Under the name Ena (エナ), she was drummer of the all-female band Itsuka Minatsu (イツカミナツ) for their 2009 single "Wild Berry".

She moved to Tokyo in January 2010, and started attending vocal classes at Watanabe Entertainment College. In October, she made her first regular appearance on the BS Fuji television show Seishun! Imoto no Mon.

Fujita started activities as a gravure idol in October 2012. She admitted that she had a lot of resistance to the move, as she grew up in a family where she was not allowed to look at gravure. Fujita has a darker alter ego named Tiramisu (ティラミス) who is vocalist of Dolce, a faux-English pop band who made their debut in 2013. In January 2014, Fujita won Tokyo Sports' Miss TōSupo 2014 grand prix. It was around this time that she combined her bikini modeling with her music, and started to learn guitar as she felt it was wrong to be taking photos with one when she could not actually play it. Fujita released the single "Yumehikousen" on October 29, 2014, via Spacey Music Entertainment.

=== Major label (2016–2022) ===
In August 2016 Fujita starred in the horror film Evil Idol Song and transferred to major record label King Records. That same month she released a mini-album of the same name that includes the film's titular theme song. The album Tsuyome no Shinzō followed a year later in August 2017. Its track "Bikini Riot" is performed under her rapping alter ego MC Bikini (MCビキニ). The album was released in Europe by JPU Records under the title Bikini Riot. Fujita was a winner of the 2017 Miss iD idol audition held by Kodansha, and won its Cheerz Award. She and other Miss iD winners appear in the 2018 horror film Vampire Clay, while Fujita also performs its theme song "Watashi Dake ga Inai Sekai".

The single "Ienai Koto wa Uta no Naka" was released in June 2018. Its music video, directed by Yoshihiro Nishimura, was released in two versions as the uncensored one was banned from TV due to its gore. It was followed by "Tsuki ga Tabeteshimatta" in January 2019, which includes a cover of The Pillows' 1996 single "Trip Dancer". Fujita also appears in Ōsama ni nare, a film celebrating The Pillows' 30th anniversary. Her album Iromono was released in June 2019. Nishimura expanded Fujita's 2018 music video "Ienai Koto wa Uta no Naka" into the October 2019 feature film Welcome to Japan: Hinomaru Lunch Box, which the musician also stars in.

Fujita's June 2020 single "Dead Stroke" is the ending theme song to the second season of the anime adaptation of Baki. The song's music video was delayed not only because of the COVID-19 pandemic in Japan, but also due to the death of professional wrestler Hana Kimura, who was set to co-star in it.

In October 2021, Fujita cancelled two concerts due to both physical and mental exhaustion. In June 2022, Shūkan Bunshun reported that Fujita had married Kenta Tokui of the comedy duo Heisei Nobushi Kobushi earlier that spring. On September 3, 2022, Fujita announced on her blog that she had given birth to her first child.

=== Yes And (2023–present) ===
Ena Fujita returned to musical activities with a concert on March 21, 2023. She released the mini-album Gurume on December 13 via Waiwai Records. On January 13, 2024, Fujita announced the formation of the all-girl pop rock band Yes And (stylized as yesAND). Consisting of Yu-yan on drums, Ena on vocals and guitar, and Sena on guitar, the first half of their name was created using the first letter of each member's name when written in English, while the second half represents everyone who supports them. They had their first concert at Shinjuku Blaze on March 22, with their first extended play, Dynamic Tune, following on November 7. Laana joined the band as bassist on July 13, 2025.

== Discography ==
=== Studio albums ===
| Year | Album details | Oricon Albums |
|---|---|---|
| 2010 | First Heart: Released: September 18, 2010 | — |
| 2012 | Ii Enbai (いい塩梅): Released: January 7, 2012 | — |
| 2012 | Osuso Wake (おすそ分け): Released: July 7, 2012 | — |
| 2013 | Pastel Parade (パステルパレード): Released: July 7, 2013; Label: Go! Go! Records | — |
| 2014 | Reversible!! (リバーシブル!!): Released: July 7, 2014; Label: Go! Go! Records | — |
| 2016 | Evil Idol Song: Released: August 24, 2016; Label: King Records, JPU Records | 144 |
| 2017 | Bikini Riot (強めの心臓, Tsuyome no Shinzō): Released: August 9, 2017; Label: King Records, JPU Records | 77 |
| 2019 | Iromono (色者): Released: June 26, 2019; Label: King Records | 78 |
| 2023 | Gurume (色者): Released: December 13, 2023; Label: Waiwai Records | — |

=== Singles ===
| Year | Title | Oricon Singles |
|---|---|---|
| 2010 | "Taiyō no Wa" (太陽の輪): Released: December 2010 | — |
| 2011 | "Zeze Hihi" (是ぜ非ひ): Released: January 2011 | — |
| 2011 | "Gyaku-sama no Sasanoyō-sama" (逆様の笹の葉様): Released: July 8, 2011 | — |
| 2012 | "Yakō Ressha" (夜行列車): Released: November 15, 2012 | — |
| 2014 | "Yumehikousen" (ユメヒコウセン): Released: October 29, 2014; Label: Spacey Music Entertainment | 106 |
| 2018 | "Ienai Koto wa Uta no Naka" (言えない事は歌の中): Released: June 20, 2018; Label: King Records | 62 |
| 2019 | "Tsuki ga Tabeteshimatta" (月が食べてしまった): Released: January 16, 2019; Label: King Records | 35 |
| 2020 | "Dead Stroke: Released: June 10, 2020; Label: King Records | 41 |

=== Home videos ===
| Year | Title | Oricon DVDs |
|---|---|---|
| 2012 | Fujita Ena to Hitori Yuenchi Birthday (藤田恵名と一人遊園地バースデイ): Released: October 26, 2012 | — |
| 2013 | Crazy Tana Butter (クレイジータナバター): Released: September 7, 2013 | — |
| 2014 | Birthday Live Drive 2014 DVD (バースデイ☆ライブドライブ2014DVD): Released: August 16, 2014 | — |
| 2015 | Ishu Kakutō-on-waza Vol. 1: Fujita Ena vs Dolce DVD (異種格闘音技Vol.1 藤田恵名vsドルチェ DVD): Released: March 12, 2015 | — |
| 2015 | Zigzag Galaxy (ジグザクギャラクシー): Released: November 25, 2015 | — |
| 2016 | Mōretsu no Susume! (モーレツのススメ！): Released: December 3, 2016 | — |
| 2018 | Ato wa Neru Dake? (あとはねるだけ？): Released: January 27, 2018 | — |
| 2019 | Mō Kite Iru (もうきている): Released: June 26, 2019 | — |

== Filmography ==
Image videos

| Year | Title |
|---|---|
| 2014 | Enamel (エナメル): Released: February 20, 2014 |
| 2015 | Mind Rock: Released: July 17, 2015 |
| 2016 | Hontō ha Dame Nan Desu yo... (本当はダメなんですよ…): Released: June 23, 2016 |
| 2017 | Kokuhaku Latte Art (告白ラテアート): Released: April 20, 2017 |
| 2018 | Chiyura Nure (ちゅら濡れ): Released: October 20, 2018 |

Films

| Year | Title | Role |
|---|---|---|
| 2017 | Evil Idol Song: Released: August 9, 2017 | Kana Fujisaki |
| 2018 | Vampire Clay (血を吸う粘土): Released: July 4, 2018 | Reina Tani |
| 2019 | Welcome to Japan: Hinomaru Lunch Box (WELCOME TO JAPAN 日の丸ランチボックス): Released: October 11, 2019 | Kika |
