= Garōden =

1995 series of Japanese martial arts novels

- First novel cover

餓狼伝
- Genre: Martial arts
- Novel series
- Written by: Baku Yumemakura
- Published by: Futabasha
- Imprint: Futaba Novels
- Original run: July 20, 1985 – present
- Volumes: 18
- Series titles
- 1. Garōden (1985–2003; 13 volumes); 2. Shin Garōden (2006–present; 5 volumes)
Further information
Manga
Written by	Baku Yumemakura
Illustrated by	Jiro Taniguchi
Published by	Asahi Sonorama
Magazine	Shishiō
Original run	1989 – 1990
Volumes	1
Live-action film
Directed by	Masato Sasaki
Produced by	Masao Tomita
Written by	Masato Sasaki
Music by	Kenichi Kamio
Studio	JVC; Tohokushinsha Film
Released	January 25, 1995
Runtime	95 minutes
Manga
Written by	Baku Yumemakura
Illustrated by	Keisuke Itagaki
Published by	Schola; Kodansha; Akita Shoten
Magazine	Comic Birz (1996–1999); Young Magazine Uppers (1999–2004); Evening (2005–2010)
Original run	August 1996 – October 2010 (hiatus)
Volumes	25 (Kodansha edition); 26 (Akita Shoten edition)
Manga
Garōden Boy
Written by	Baku Yumemakura
Illustrated by	Keisuke Itagaki
Published by	Kodansha
Imprint	Shōnen Magazine Comics
Magazine	Weekly Shōnen Magazine
Original run	January 14, 2004 – July 7, 2004
Volumes	2
Video game
Garōden Breakblow
Developer	Opus
Publisher	ESP Software
Genre	Fighting game
Platform	PlayStation 2
Released	November 17, 2005
Video game
Garōden Breakblow Fist or Twist
Developer	Opus
Publisher	ESP Software
Genre	Fighting game
Platform	PlayStation 2
Released	March 15, 2007
Manga
Shin Garōden
Written by	Baku Yumemakura
Illustrated by	Masami Nobe
Published by	Akita Shoten
Magazine	Weekly Shōnen Champion
Original run	February 14, 2013 – May 29, 2014
Volumes	6
Original net animation
Garouden: The Way of the Lone Wolf
Directed by	Atsushi Ikariya
Written by	Sadayuki Murai
Music by	Takeshi Ueda
Studio	NAZ
Licensed by	Netflix
Released	May 23, 2024
Runtime	23–28 minutes
Episodes	8
- icon

Garōden (Japanese: 餓狼伝; lit. 'Legend of the Hungry Wolves') is a Japanese martial arts novel series written by Baku Yumemakura. The series' first part consists of 13 novels, released from July 1985 to March 2003. The second part, Shin Garōden, started in December 2006, with five volumes released by October 2020.

A manga series adaptation by Jirō Taniguchi was published from 1989 to 1990. A second manga series adaptation by Keisuke Itagaki was published from 1996 to 2010, before entering on indefinite hiatus. A prequel manga series by Itagaki, titled Garōden Boy, was published in 2004. A manga adaptation of Shin Garōden, by Masami Nobe, was published from 2013 to 2014.

A feature film was released in January 1995. Two video games based on Itagaki's manga adaptation were released for the PlayStation 2; Garōden Breakblow in 2005, and Garōden Breakblow Fist or Twist in 2007. An original net animation (ONA) adaptation, titled Garouden: The Way of the Lone Wolf, premiered worldwide on Netflix in May 2024.

== Plot ==
Bunshichi Tanba, a skilled fighter, takes pleasure in defeating televised combat champions and celebrities in unsanctioned street fights. His path crosses with the underground wrestling organization FAW (Federation of Amateur Wrestling), where he suffers an unexpected defeat against an unheralded wrestler. This loss drives him to undergo years of intensive training before returning for vengeance.

Upon his comeback, Tanba's refined abilities capture the interest of two legendary martial figures: Makoto Tatsumi, the formidable FAW owner known as "the Great" for his unparalleled ring dominance and charisma, and Shozan Matsuo, dubbed "the Demon of Karate" for his supernatural speed and power as head of Japan's premier karate school. Both seek to recruit Tanba for their respective factions, exposing him to a brutal hierarchy of elite fighters. As Tanba navigates this dangerous world, he faces escalating challenges against both allies and adversaries that test his limits.

== Characters ==
Bunshichi Tanba (丹波 文七, Tanba Bunshichi)
Voiced by: Tetsu Inada (ONA) (Japanese); Armen Taylor (English)
Bunshichi Tanba, a martial artist driven by self-doubt after losing to Kajiwara, trains relentlessly for three years before avenging his defeat. His skills attract the attention of both Great Tatsumi and Shozan Matsuo, who seek to recruit him. He later confronts Jūzō Fujimaki, an impostor using Tanba's name to defeat Hokushin fighters. Their battle ends inconclusively. After witnessing Jyohei Tsutsumi overpowering yakuza assailants, Tanba challenges him to an unrestricted match organized by Tatsumi. Tanba wins by knockout, during which he recalls his first violent act. Following the Hokushinkai tournament, he pursues unsanctioned street fights against various masters, including the injured Teruo Kitaoka.
Jūzō Fujimaki (藤巻 十三, Fujimaki Jūzō)
Voiced by: Ryōta Takeuchi (ONA) (Japanese); Patrick Seitz (English)
Jūzō Fujimaki, a fugitive practitioner of Takemiya Ryuu martial arts, adopts the alias "Bunshichi Tanba" to lure out the real Tanba by defeating Hokushin fighters. Their confrontation ends in a draw when interrupted by Saeko and her lover Tsutomu Himekawa—Fujimaki's target. Unable to enter Matsuo's tournament due to his wanted status, Fujimaki trains Hiroshi Nagata instead. After Himekawa defeats Nagata in the finals, Fujimaki challenges him again, breaking his own arm to even the match. He nearly wins using the lethal "Jikaburi" throw, but loses after a mistimed flying kick allows Himekawa to counter and knock him unconscious.
Shozan Matsuo (松尾 象山, Matsuo Shōzan)
Voiced by: Rintarō Nishi (ONA) (Japanese); Mick Wingert (English)
Shozan Matsuo, founder of the Hokushin School, stands among the strongest fighters in the series, surpassing even Bunshichi Tanba and Jūzō Fujimaki. A self-proclaimed "Strongest of All" karate master seeking worthy opponents, he organizes a tournament through Tatsumi, offering the winner a chance to face him. When tournament champion Tsutomu Himekawa proves too injured to fight, Matsuo demonstrates his prowess by effortlessly defeating both a yakuza enforcer and a SWAT officer armed with Duralium riot gear.
Jyohei Tsutsumi (堤 城平, Tsutsumi Jōhei)
Jyohei Tsutsumi, a Hokushin student and deliveryman, demonstrates formidable combat skills that impress Bunshichi Tanba. With Shozan Matsuo's endorsement, Tatsumi arranges an unrestricted match between them, which Tanba wins by knockout. During Tsutsumi's hospital recovery, Tanba visits him, signaling their newfound mutual respect.
Hiroshi Nagata (長田 弘, Nagata Hiroshi)
Hiroshi Nagata, a pro wrestler, enters Matsuo's tournament despite his trainer's objections. After training with Fujimaki and Kajiwara, he reaches the finals against Himekawa. Nagata lands his signature Ko-ou technique (a flying knee into a skull strike), dislocating Himekawa's shoulder—previously an instant KO. But Himekawa recovers and knocks out the celebrating Nagata with a sudden kick.
Teruo Kataoka (片岡 輝夫, Kataoka Teruo)
A practitioner of Shisei-kan karate—a brutal style that hardens the body through painful conditioning—he develops near-superhuman durability, capable of breaking concrete and bending metal. Though dominant in tournaments, he avoids street fights until facing Tanba in an unsanctioned brawl. His tournament run ended when Hikoichi Kurama defeated him via suplex.
Makoto Tatsumi (巽 真, Tatsumi Makoto) / Great Tatsumi (グレート巽, Gurēto Tatsumi)
Tatsumi, a Brazilian-Japanese fighter, endured abuse from his adoptive father—a wrestler who tortured him—before ultimately castrating the man with his bare hands and forcing him to commit seppuku. Disillusioned with professional wrestling's theatrics, he entered the underground fighting circuit, where he met Crybaby Sakura. After earning substantial wealth, he founded the Federation of Amateur Wrestling (FAW) under his company Toyo Puroresu. He now challenges Shozan Matsuo to a five-on-five legendary match.
Crybaby Sakura (泣き虫(クライベイビー)サクラ, Kuraibeibī Sakura)
Crybaby Sakura, a seven-foot blind fighter, ran the underground ring where Tatsumi competed. Blinded by his mother in childhood, he developed superhuman senses through brutal training. In their fight, Sakura revealed a recurring vision of a locked door, believing Tatsumi could open it. After Tatsumi's upset victory, Sakura requested death—his neck snap opened the door, revealing an afterlife where he reunited with his mother as a sighted child. Tatsumi witnessed their peaceful reunion before leaving.
Ryuji Kubo (久保 涼二, Kubo Ryūji)
Voiced by: Ryōta Suzuki (ONA) (Japanese); Sean Chiplock (English)
Ryuji Kubo, Tanba's devoted friend and sparring partner, maintained unwavering loyalty during his three-year absence, still considering him his mentor. While Tanba was gone, Kubo trained at a Hokushinkai branch dojo but rejected formal membership, easily surpassing its practitioners yet finding the training unsatisfying without Tanba's guidance. Their bond remained intact upon Tanba's return.
Toshio Kajiwara (梶原 年男, Kajiwara Toshio)
Kiyoshi Kajiwara, an FAW wrestler, was the first to defeat Bunshichi Tanba. Three years later, Tanba avenged this loss by swiftly defeating him in a rematch. After Tanba's bout with Jyohei Tsutsumi, Kajiwara was scheduled to face a judo practitioner but was instead ambushed and defeated by rising star Hikoichi Kurama using the Giant Swing. Later, Kajiwara assists Hiroshi Nagata as both trainer and cornerman for the tournament.
Tsutomu Himekawa (姫川 勉, Himekawa Tsutomu)
Voiced by: Shunsuke Takeuchi (ONA) (Japanese); Kaiji Tang (English)
Tsutomu Himekawa, a disciple of Shozan Matsuo, once fought his mentor to a draw despite suffering a broken arm. Renowned for his graceful, precise fighting style, he remains undefeated and seeks to surpass Matsuo. After dominating the tournament to earn a challenge match against his teacher, he defeats Hiroshi Nagata in the finals. When Jyuzo Fujimaki immediately confronts him, Himekawa endures a brutal exchange before countering a flying kick to secure victory. His injuries ultimately prevent the long-awaited match against Matsuo.
Hikoichi Kurama (鞍馬 彦一, Kurama Hikoichi)
Hikoichi Kurama, a brash young prodigy and Great Tatsumi's favored successor, demonstrates exceptional strength and rapid learning ability. Despite his arrogance and tumultuous relationships—often interrupted by girlfriends' complaints—he trains for Matsuo's tournament by effortlessly defeating three karate-trained wrestlers. Tatsumi then pits him against a master of ancient karate; though Kurama loses, he immediately assimilates new techniques before leaving to meet a girlfriend. Seeking recognition, he later ambushes Kiyoshi Kajiwara backstage at Tatsumi's event, knocking him out to steal his match.

== Media ==
=== Novel ===
Written by Baku Yumemakura, the first volume of Garōden was released on July 20, 1985. The first part finished with the 13th volume, released on March 4, 2003. The first novel of the second part, titled Shin Garōden (新・餓狼伝), was released on December 12, 2006. As of October 16, 2020, five volumes have been released.

=== Manga ===
A manga series adaptation by Jiro Taniguchi was published in Asahi Sonorama's Shishiō magazine from 1989 to 1990, and collected in a single volume released on June 30, 1990.

Another manga series adaptation by Keisuke Itagaki started in the August 1996 issue of Schola's manga magazine Monthly Comic Birz. Schola collected its chapters in five tankōbon volumes, released from December 1996 to February 1999. Monthly Comic Birz ceased publication after the May 1999 issue, and the series was transferred to Kodansha's Young Magazine Uppers in 1999. the magazine ceased publication in 2004, and the manga was transferred to Kodansha's Evening on February 8, 2005. (Note: It started in the magazine's fifth issue of 2005, released on February 8 of the same year.) Its last chapter in the magazine was published on October 12, 2010, and the series was put on indefinite hiatus. Kodansha released 25 volumes from August 6, 1999, to December 12, 2010. Akita Shoten started republishing the series on April 7, 2011; for this event, the first two chapters were published in Weekly Shōnen Champion on March 31 and April 7 of the same year. 26 volumes were released until August 8, 2012.

==== Related manga ====
A prequel manga series by Itakagi, titled Garōden Boy (餓狼伝 BOY), was serialized in Kodansha's shōnen manga magazine Weekly Shōnen Magazine from January 14 to July 7, 2004; (Note: It started in the magazine's seventh issue of 2004 (cover date January 28), released on January 14 of the same year.) (Note: It finished in the magazine's 32nd issue of 2004 (cover date July 21), released on July 7 of the same year.) two volumes were released by Kodansha on July 15 and August 26 of the same year. Akita Shoten re-released both volumes on September 17, 2012.

A manga adaptation of Shin Garōden by Masami Nobe, was serialized in Weekly Shōnen Champion from February 14, 2013, to May 29, 2014. Akita Shoten released six volumes from June 7, 2013, to July 8, 2014.

=== Film ===
A feature film adaptation directed by Masato Sasaki premiered on January 25, 1995.

=== Video games ===
Two video games based on Keisuke Itagaki's manga adaptation, published by Entertainment Software Publishing (ESP), were released for the PlayStation 2. The first game, Garōden Breakdown, was released on November 17, 2005, and the second, Garōden: Breakblow – Fist or Twist, was released on March 15, 2007.

=== Original net animation ===
An original net animation (ONA) adaptation, titled Garouden: The Way of the Lone Wolf, animated by NAZ and produced by Netflix, premiered worldwide on the platform on May 23, 2024. It was directed by Atsushi Ikariya, with Daisuke Mataga serving as assistant director, and Sadayuki Murai as script writer. Ikariya also designed the characters with Momoko Kawai. The music was composed by Takeshi Ueda. Ueda, credited as his music project AA=, performed the opening theme song "Fight & Pride", and the ending theme song "Cry Boy".

== Reception ==
Volume 20 of the manga ranked ninth in the May 9–15, 2007, Japanese comic ranking. Volume 23 ranked 15th in the April 19–26, 2009, ranking, selling 41,216 copies.
