= Susumu Aoyagi =

Japanese baseball player

- Catcher
- Born: July 9, 1968 (age 57); Kurume, Fukuoka
- Bats: Right Throws: Right

NPB debut
- April 30, 1989, for the Lotte Orions

NPB statistics (through 2002 season)
- Hits: 278
- RBIs: 140
- Batting average: .232

Teams
- Lotte Orions/Chiba Lotte Marines (1987–1994); Yakult Swallows (1995–2002)
- Last updated on: October 22, 2017

Susumu Aoyagi (青柳 進, Aoyagi Susumu) was a professional baseball player. He played in Nippon Professional Baseball (NPB) for the Lotte Orions/Chiba Lotte Marines in the Japan Pacific League and the Yakult Swallows in the Japan Central League.
