= Ryōko Aoyagi =

Japanese actress and singer (1978–2009)

- 青柳涼子
- Born: September 15, 1978
- Died: September 5, 2009 (aged 30)
- Occupations: Actress, singer

Ryōko Aoyagi (青柳 涼子, Aoyagi Ryōko) (September 15, 1978 – September 5, 2009), was a Japanese actress and singer.

== Filmography ==
- Baki the Grappler (2 episodes in 2001) – Mai

== Discography ==
- Baki the Grappler, Opening theme song
- Grappler Baki Maximum Tournament, Ending theme song
- Sorrow believe (哀 believe) (2001)
- Reborn (2001)
- I loved ... (2001)
- All alone (2001)
