= Keisuke Itagaki =

Japanese manga artist (born 1957)

Keisuke Itagaki 板垣 恵介
- Born: Hiroyuki Itagaki; April 4, 1957 (age 69) Kushiro, Kushiro Subprefecture, Japan
- Area: Manga artist
- Notable works: Baki the Grappler
- Children: 3, including Paru Itagaki

Hiroyuki Itagaki (Japanese: 板垣 博之, Hepburn: Itagaki Hiroyuki; born April 4, 1957), better known by the pen name Keisuke Itagaki (板垣 恵介, Itagaki Keisuke), is a Japanese manga artist. He is best known for his martial arts series Baki the Grappler (1991–1999) and its many sequels, which together have sold over 100 million copies, making it one of the best-selling manga series in history. Itagaki lives in Fuchū, Tokyo, and has been a Musashi Province Fuchū Ambassador since 2014. He is the father of fellow manga artist Paru Itagaki.

== Career ==
As a teenager, Itagaki admired karate master Mas Oyama and dedicated himself to working out. He holds a second degree black belt in Shorinji Kempo. Wanting a career where he would be praised for his physical regimen, Itagaki served five years in the 1st Airborne Brigade of the Japan Ground Self-Defense Force. During his service he practiced amateur boxing and competed in the National Sports Festival. Inspired by a line in Eikichi Yazawa's autobiography, Itagaki set out to become a manga artist at 24, after having been drawing since the age of three. After struggling for five years, he entered Kazuo Koike's Gekiga Sonjuku in 1987, enrolling in both the manga artist and manga author (or gensakusha) courses. Because he was already married with children at this point, he took the classes, which together cost ¥180,000, very seriously.

Itagaki made his debut with Make-Upper in 1989, at the age of 32. It ran in the magazines Young Shoot and Comic Shoot, published by Koike's Studio Ship. He began Baki the Grappler in Akita Shoten's Weekly Shōnen Champion in 1991.

In 1996, Itagaki began an adaptation of Baku Yumemakura's Garōden novel series. He also created the spin-off series Garōden Boy (2004). Since 1998, Itagaki irregularly publishes one-shots in the Waga Seishun no Narashino Dai-ichi Kūtei-dan series, based on his experiences in the Self-Defense Force, in the magazines Young Champion and Weekly Shōnen Champion. A book collecting the four published at the time was released on January 1, 2023.

Itagaki designed a special costume for Bruce Irvin in Tekken 5 (2004).

In November 2010, Itagaki began Dogesen, a manga centered around dogeza, with his friend and fellow manga artist Rin Kasahara. After coming up with the initial idea, Itagaki attended plot meetings and supervised, while Rin wrote and illustrated the work for Weekly Manga Goraku. However, disagreements resulted in the dissolving of the partnership in October 2011. Rin continued the series under a modified title in a different magazine. Itagaki began Daku Jotaro in the October issue of Play Comic. He wrote the manga, while Seisaku Kano illustrated it. However, despite the second chapter announcing it would be moved to Young Champion, the series has not resumed. Instead, Itagaki decided to start a new manga with the dogeza theme. He began Shaman in the December issue of Weekly Manga Goraku. Ura Saikyō Dogeza (裏最強土下座), a book Itagaki wrote on dogeza, was published by Gentosha on September 26, 2013.

Itagaki starred in the television show Itagaki Keisuke ga Iku! Saikyō Dōjō (板垣恵介が行く！最強道場), which was broadcast on BS-TBS on March 20, 2021. It follows as he visits dojos for various martial arts, including Jeet Kune Do and Krav Maga. He illustrated the para taekwondo section of the official programme for the 2020 Summer Paralympics and created the key visual for the 2021 Yubari International Fantastic Film Festival.

== Works ==
- Make-Upper (1989–1991)
- Baki the Grappler (グラップラー刃牙, Gurappurā Baki; 1991–1999)
- Garōden (餓狼伝; 1996–2010), adaptation of the novel series
- Baki (バキ; 1999–2005)
- Garōden Boy (餓狼伝BOY; 2004), side story of the novel series
- Baki Hanma (範馬刃牙, Hanma Baki; 2005–2012)
- Dogesen (どげせん; 2010–2011), planning and cooperation, written and illustrated by Rin
- Daku Jotaro (濁ジョータロー; 2011), author, illustrated by Seisaku Kano
- Shaman (謝男 シャーマン; 2011–present)
- Baki-Dou (刃牙道, Baki-Dō; 2014–2018)
- Bakidou (バキ道, Bakidō; 2018–2023)
- Jiden Itagaki Keisuke Jieitai Hiroku ~Waga Seishun no Narashino Dai-ichi Kūtei-dan~ (自伝板垣恵介自衛隊秘録～我が青春の習志野第一空挺団～; 2023), collects four entries in Itagaki's Waga Seishun no Narashino Dai-ichi Kūtei-dan series
- Baki Rahen (刃牙らへん; 2023–present)
