= Under the Mountain =

Under the Mountain may refer to:

- Under the Mountain (novel), a 1979 children's novel by Maurice Gee
- Under the Mountain (miniseries), a 1981 television series based on the novel
- Under the Mountain (film), a 2009 New Zealand film based on the novel

== See also ==
- Under the Mountains, a 1920 Hungarian silent drama film
