= Haunting of Cassie Palmer =

- Created by: Alfred Shaughnessy, from the novel by Vivien Alcock
- Starring: Helen Probyn; Elizabeth Spriggs
- Country of origin: United Kingdom
- Original language: English
- No. of seasons: 1
- No. of episodes: 6

Production
- Running time: 25 minutes
- Production company: TVS

Original release
- Network: ITV
- Release: 26 February – 2 April 1982

The Haunting of Cassie Palmer is a British television drama for children produced in 1981 by TVS (Television South) for the ITV network and first broadcast on 26 February 1982. The series was based on a novel by Vivien Alcock. In the United States, it was aired on Nickelodeon as part of the series The Third Eye.

The show was part of the launch programming for TVS which started broadcasting on 1 January 1982. Nickelodeon had also recently launched when it added The Third Eye series to its live-action line up. The Third Eye was a sci-fi/supernatural anthology that included Into the Labyrinth, The Haunting of Cassie Palmer, Children of the Stones and Under the Mountain. Later The Witches and the Grinnygog was added.

== Plot ==
This is a story of 13-year-old Cassie Palmer who lives with her mother, older brother, and sister. Cassie's mother is an eccentric "psychic" (medium). After some of her clients are incensed to discover her mother has tricked a woman into thinking that she is communicating with her deceased husband by brushing her face with a feather, the clients threaten to prosecute her. Mrs. Palmer pleads with them not to as such an action would render her homeless.

Mrs. Palmer explains to Cassie that her powers are only intermittent, and as result she sometimes has to embellish the reading to produce results her clients will be happy with. Mrs. Palmer explains that Cassie, being seventh child of a seventh child, would develop great psychic powers as she reached maturity. However, Cassie has no wish to be a psychic. Unfortunately, these abilities have already manifested and Cassie is simply unaware of them.

Desperate to protect her mother from charges of fraud, Cassie goes to a cemetery to try to call up a spirit Charlotte Webb who died as a small child. Instead a dark figure appears from behind a tombstone. He tells her his name is Deverill and wants to know why she's summoned him. Cassie runs away.

Cassie eventually tells her mother, who soon is gravely concerned for their safety. Deverill appears to Cassie several more times, but aside from Cassie and her mother, no one can see or hear him. Unsure of Deverill's intent, she invites him to her house so that her mother can find out what his motives are. He complies but vanishes before her mother can discern if he is a sinister or benevolent entity.

Eventually the Palmers have to sell their house and move to another town as a result of poor business and the bad reputation acquired from the clients who accused Mrs. Palmer of fraud. Deverill reveals to Cassie that when he was alive he buried a small treasure in the floorboards of a house in town. Cassie finds the treasure and is able to use it to purchase a new home for herself, and her mother and two older siblings to start a new life. In exchange for this good deed, Mr. Deverill is able to leave this plane of existence for the great beyond. Cassie had freed his restless spirit of an eternity of darkness and torment. Her psychic powers apparently were burned out during the struggle thus enabling her to lead a normal life, free from the influence of the supernatural.

== Credits ==
=== Cast ===
- Cassie Palmer: Helen Probyn
- Mrs. Palmer: Elizabeth Spriggs
- Deverill: Geoffrey Rose
- Tom Palmer: Stephen Bint
- Mary Palmer: Ruth Adcock

=== Crew ===
- Director: Dorothea Brooking
- Writer: Alfred Shaughnessy
- Producer / Executive Producer: Anna Home
- Original Music Composer: Kenyon Emrys-Roberts
- Production Designer: John Newton-Clarke
- Stunt Arrangers: Sue Crossland & Paul Weston
