= Rangitoto Island =

Island in New Zealand

Ngā Rangi-i-totongia-a Tama-te-kapua (Māori)
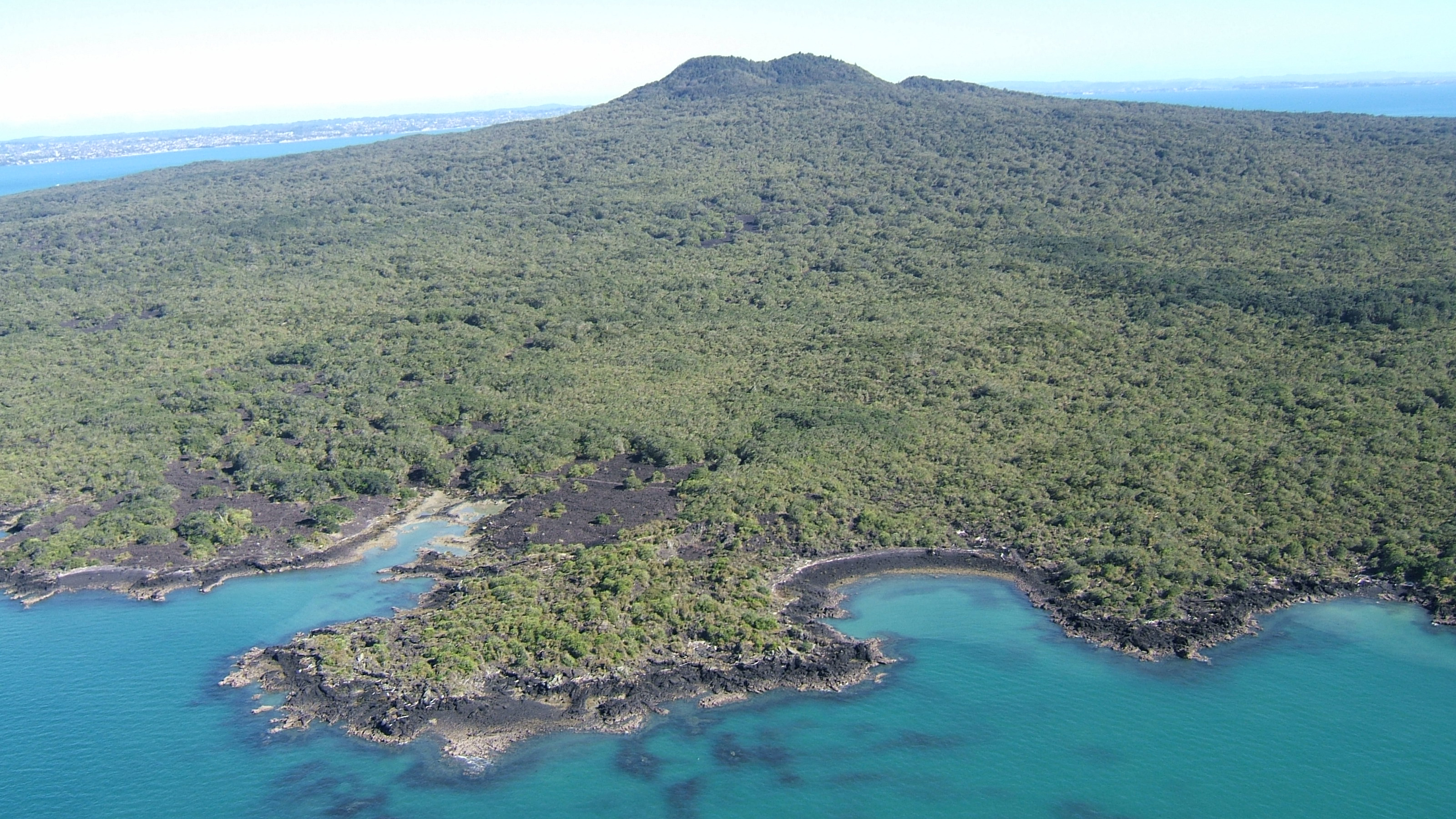
- Oblique aerial of Rangitoto Volcano from the south

- Location within New Zealand

Geography
- Location: Auckland
- Coordinates: 36.786742°S 174.860115°E
- Highest point: 260 m (850 ft)

Administration
- New Zealand

Additional information
- Age Meghalayan

Rangitoto Island is a volcanic island in the Hauraki Gulf near Auckland, New Zealand. The 5.5 km (3.4 mi) wide island is a symmetrical shield volcano cone capped by central scoria cones, reaching a height of 260 m (850 ft). Rangitoto is the youngest and largest of the approximately 50 volcanoes of the Auckland volcanic field, having erupted in two phases about 1450 CE and 1500 CE and covering an area of 2,311 ha (5,710 acres). It is separated from the mainland of Auckland's North Shore by the Rangitoto Channel. Since World War II, it has been linked by a causeway to the much older, non-volcanic Motutapu Island.

Rangitoto is Māori for 'Bloody Sky', with the name coming from the full phrase Ngā Rangi-i-totongia-a Tama-te-kapua ("The days of the bleeding of Tama-te-kapua"). Tama-te-kapua was the captain of the Arawa waka (canoe) and was badly wounded on the island, after having lost a battle with the Tainui iwi (tribe) at Islington Bay.

== Geology ==
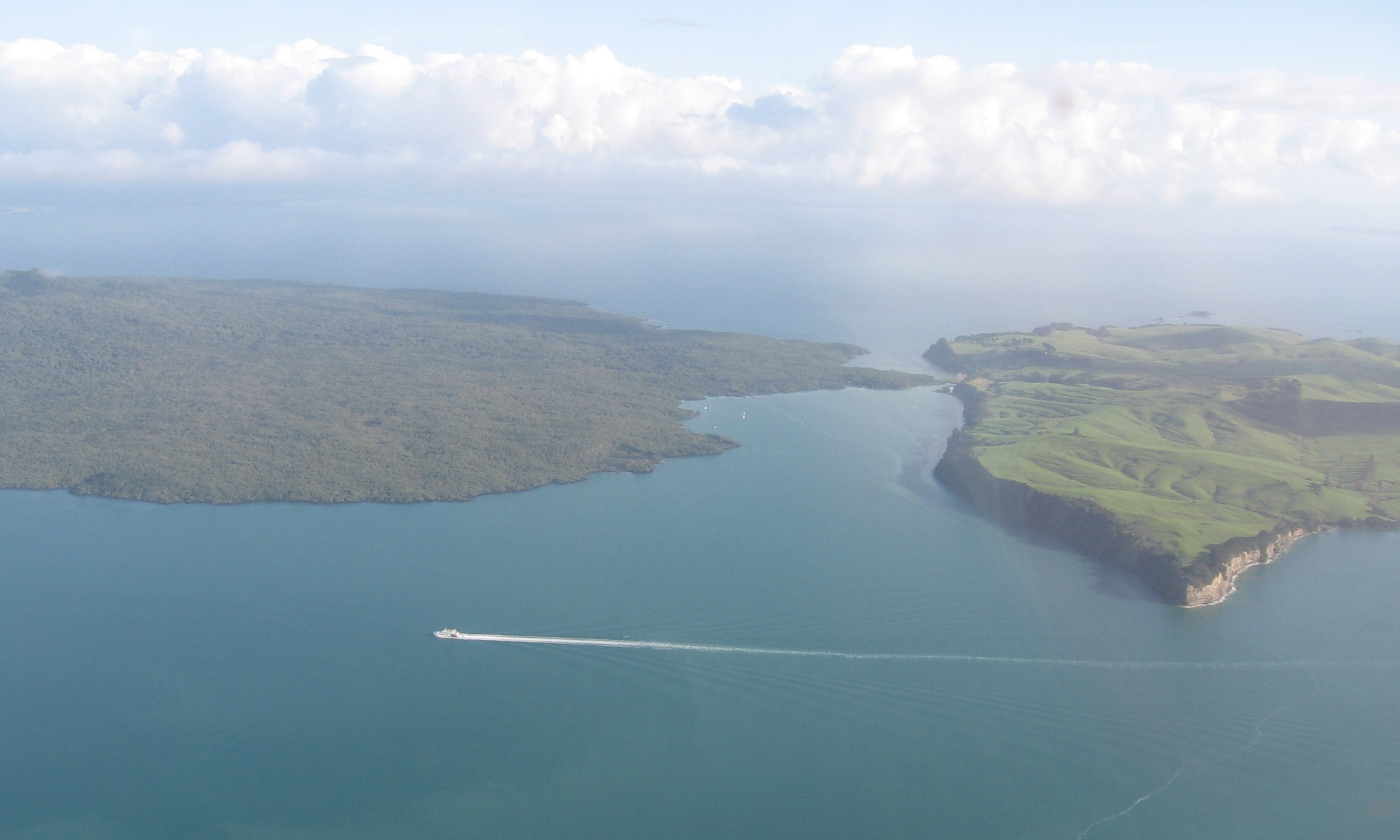
The thin land bridge link between Rangitoto Island (left) and Motutapu Island is visible here from the air

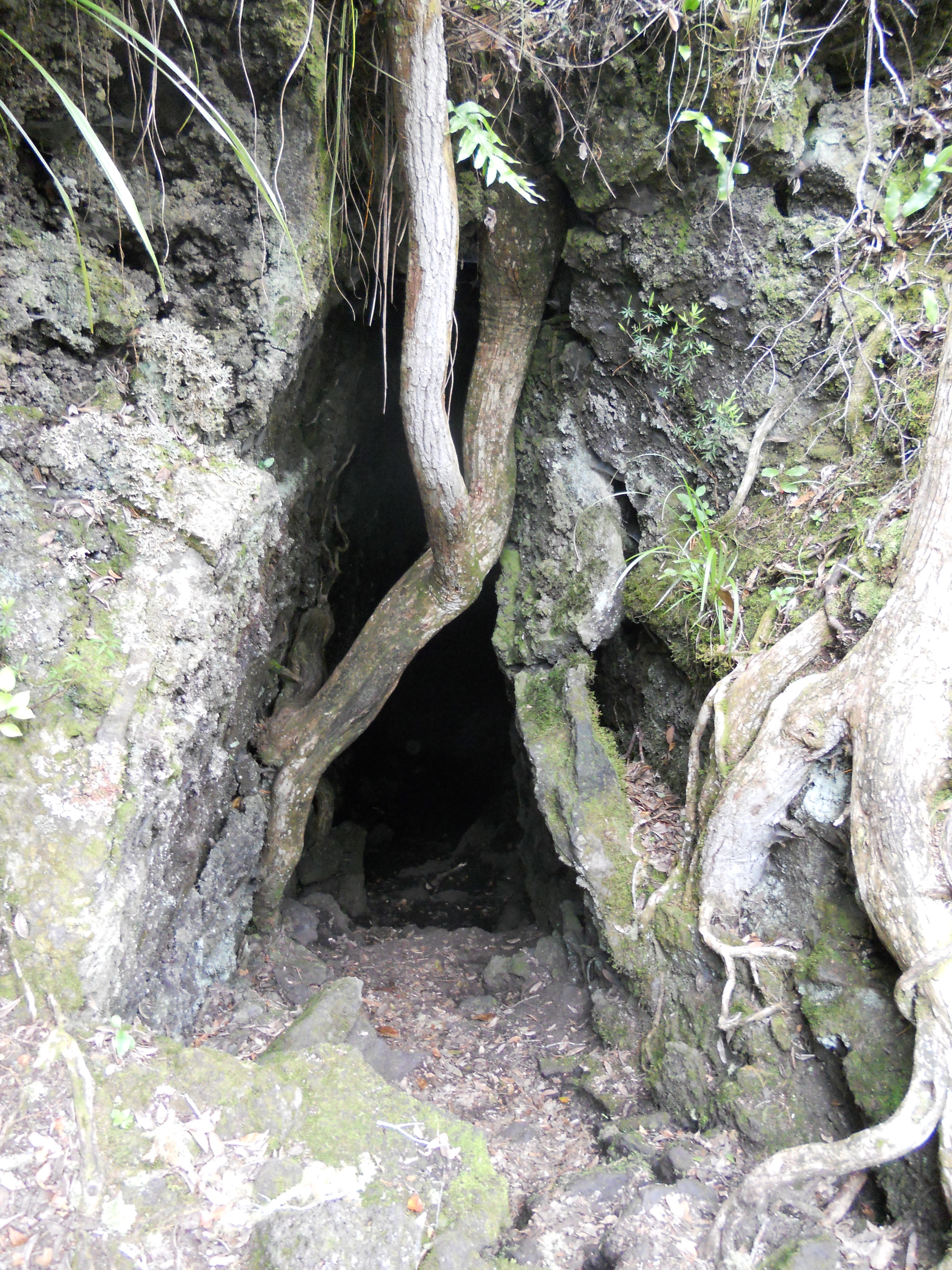
The opening to a lava tube at Rangitoto, partially obstructed by tree growth

Rangitoto formed during two phases of eruptions that may have lasted only 5–10 years, about 600 years ago. The first part of the eruption sequence, dated by radiocarbon methods at about 629 years ago (= 553 ± 7 yrs BP) was initially wet and produced surges of volcanic ash that mantled neighbouring Motutapu Island from alkaline olivine basalt eruptives sourced from the north cone area. The later part of the eruption dated at about 580 years ago (= 504 ± 5 yrs BP) was dry and built most of Rangitoto, erupting all the sub-alkaline basaltic lava flows of the shield and the southern scoria cone at the apex that mostly buried the north cone. The 2.3 km^{3} (0.55 mi^{3}) of material that erupted from the volcano was nearly as much as the combined mass produced by all the previous eruptions in the Auckland volcanic field, which were spread over nearly 200,000 years.

=== Eruptive history ===
In 2013, scientists from Auckland University reported that Rangitoto had been much more active in the past than previously thought, suggesting it had been active on and off for around 1000 years before the final eruptions around 600 years ago. This was based on recognition of a number of horizons of tiny volcanic glass shards, seemingly erupted from Rangitoto, in sediment cores from Lake Pupuke. To test this hypothesis, a 150 m (490 ft) deep hole was drilled through the western flank of Rangitoto in February 2014. No supporting evidence for these hypothesised small eruptions up to 1000 yrs before the main eruption of Rangitoto was found. The university scientists did, however, core a thin basalt lava flow within marine sediment dated at 6000 years old, and hypothesised that this was an even earlier eruption from Rangitoto. Civil Defence officials said the discovery did not make living in Auckland any more dangerous, but did change their view of how an eruption might proceed. These headline-grabbing results were controversial and not accepted by all geologists. In 2018 many of the original group of Auckland University geologists reported on their latest research and reinterpretation of the evidence and concluded that Rangitoto only erupted once, about 600 yrs ago, possibly in two phases. The thin lava flow within 6000 yr-old sediment in the Rangitoto drillcore has exactly the same chemistry as the lowest/oldest flows of the cored shield volcano above and has recently been shown to also have the same U-Th-Ra signature and both must have been erupted and solidified at virtually the same time. The thin "flow" is therefore likely to be basalt lava that was intruded into the sediment as the shield volcano was starting to be formed. This is similar to the situation seen on the coast at Queen Victoria Rock, near the Rangitoto Lighthouse, where lava flows have ploughed into the soft seafloor sediment and intruded into it, bringing at least one sediment slab up to high tide level. Thus no evidence has been found so far to support the hypotheses of earlier eruptions of Rangitoto between 620 and 8000 yrs ago. It is possible that Rangitoto buried a smaller and much older and unrelated volcano, a view possibly supported, but certainly not proven, by recent microfossil research from the marine sediments obtained from beneath Rangitoto in the stratigraphic drillhole.

=== Structure ===
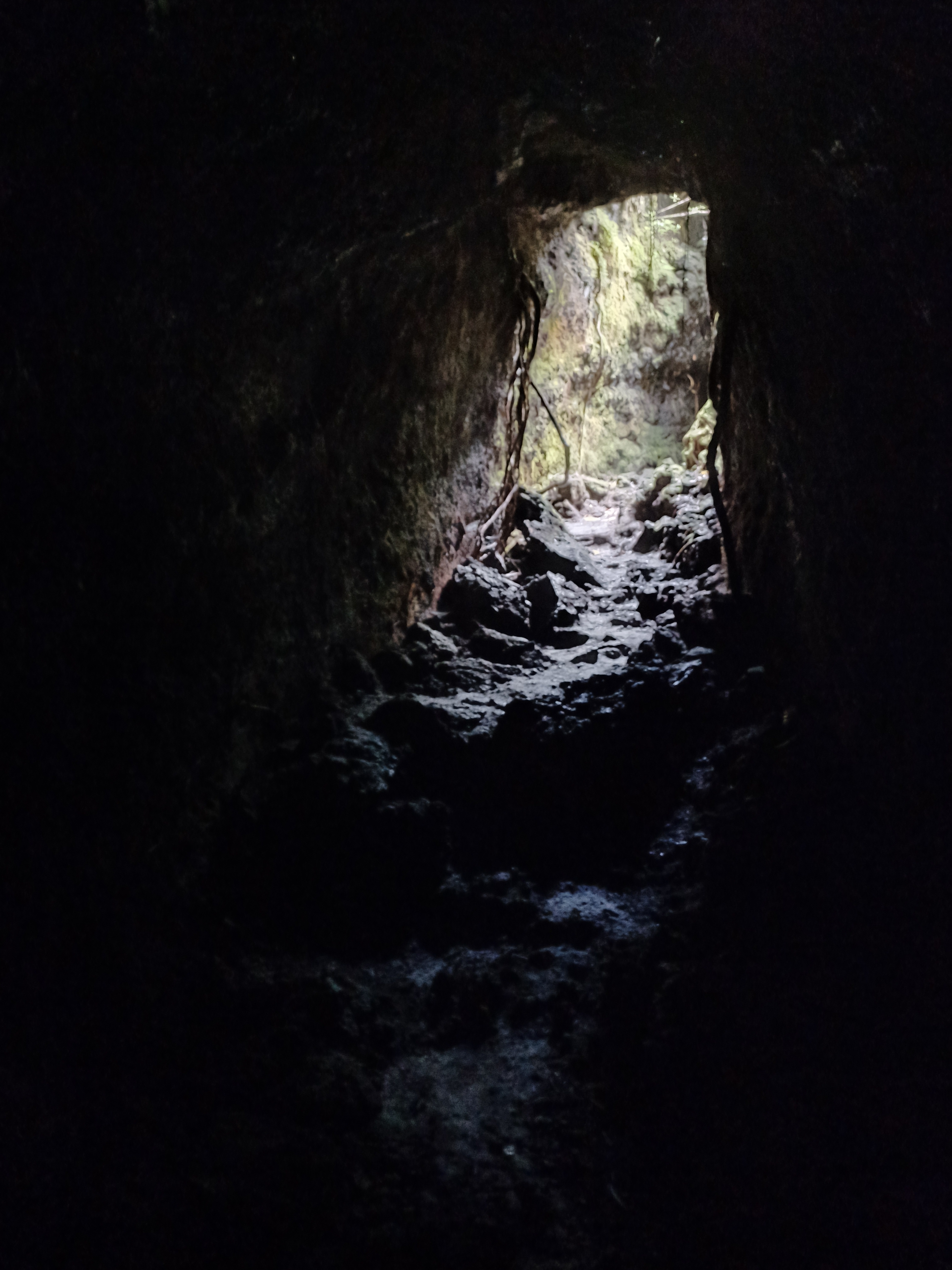
View from inside one of the caves

The southern cone of Rangitoto Volcano with its own crater likely buries a more northern explosion crater and tuff ring formed during the early wet phase of eruption in the middle of the Waitemata Harbour. The external form of Rangitoto consists of a circular, gently sloping shield composed of numerous overlapping lava flows. The centre of the volcano is capped by the remains of much steeper scoria cones made of loose scoria that was erupted by dry-style fire-fountaining from several vents. Gravitational studies show a relationship with the Islington Bay Fault which strikes between Rangitoto and Mototapu islands but which is distinctly offset by about 3.5 km (2.2 mi) from the Rangitoto vents to the east of the fault and that there is a density beneath the southern cones. This along with magnetic studies has been interpreted to show a solidified intra-cone feeder dyke as the most likely explanation for the mass under the southern cone system and some buried mass to the north of the northern cone whose character can not be fully modelled but is likely to be a feeder dyke. At depth of more than 6 km (3.7 mi) the magma may have initially tracked the Islington Bay Fault in this modelling. Withdrawal of magma back down the throat of the volcano at the end of the eruptions has resulted in slight subsidence of the scoria cones. This has created a moat-like ring around the central scoria cones, which the main track to Rangitoto's summit passes through on the way to the summit and gives a distinctive shape to the island. In some parts of the island, fields of clinker-like black basalt lava are exposed where vegetation has yet to colonise the surface of the youngest lava flows. About 200 metres from the top of the mountain on the eastern side visitors can walk through sections of two lava tubes — cave-like tubes left behind after the passage of liquid lava. The more accessible of the caves are signposted. Lava tubes are formed when low-viscosity molten lava known as pāhoehoe flows and cools on the outside due to contact with the ground and air, to form a hard crust allowing the still-liquid molten lava to continue to flow through inside. In several places the lava tube roof has collapsed thus providing several different entrances to the one elongate tube. A torch is needed to explore the caves. The longest known cave is about 120 m long.

== Biology ==
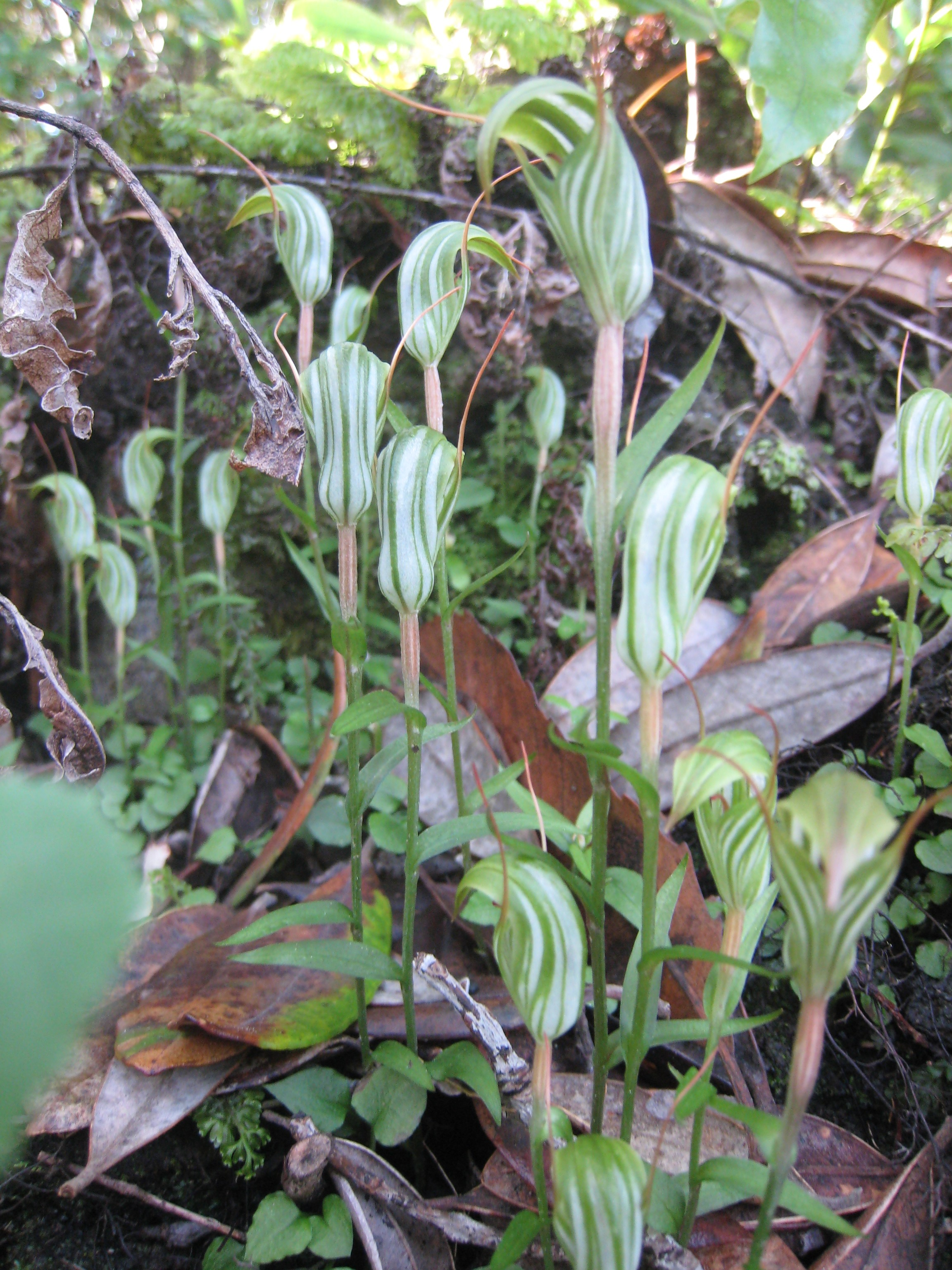
Pterostylis growing on Rangitoto

Because there are virtually no streams on the island, plants rely on rainfall for moisture. It has the largest forest of pōhutukawa trees in the world, as well as many northern rātā trees. In total, more than 200 species of trees and flowers thrive on the island, including several species of orchid, as well as more than 40 types of ferns. The vegetation pattern was influenced by the more recent eruptions creating lava flow crevices where pōhutukawa trees (Metrosideros ssp.) grow.

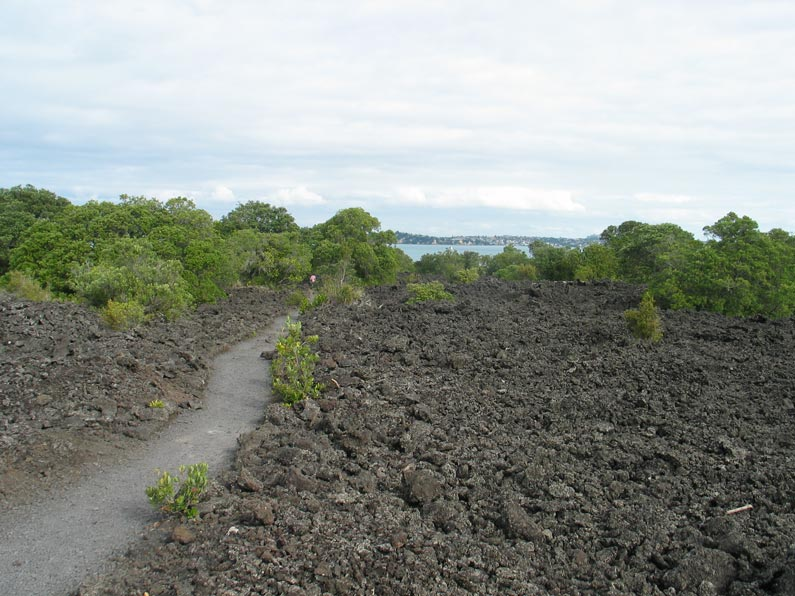
Lava field with path and encroaching vegetation

The island is considered especially significant because all stages from raw lava fields to scrub establishment and sparse forests are visible. As lava fields contain no soil of the typical kind, windblown matter and slow breaking-down processes of the native flora are still in the process of transforming the island into a more habitable area for most plants (an example of primary succession), which is one of the reasons why the local forests are relatively young and do not yet support a large bird population. However, the Kākā, a New Zealand-endemic parrot, is thought to have lived on the island in pre-European times.

Goats were present on Rangitoto in large numbers in the mid 19th century and survived until the 1880s. Fallow deer were introduced to Motutapu in 1862 and spread to Rangitoto, but disappeared by the 1980s. The brush-tailed rock-wallaby was introduced to Motutapu in 1873, and was common on Rangitoto by 1912, and the brushtail possum was introduced in 1931 and again in 1946. Both were eradicated in a campaign from 1990 to 1996 using 1080 and cyanide poison and dogs. The eradication campaign did not have a significant effect on bird species diversity and abundance, due to the presence of other predators.

Stoats, rabbits, mice, rats, cats and hedgehogs remained a problem on the island, but the Department of Conservation (DOC) aimed to eradicate them beginning with the poisoning of black rats, brown rats and mice and in August 2011, both Rangitoto and neighbouring Motutapu Islands were officially declared pest-free with both islands now also boasting populations of newly translocated North Island saddlebacks.

As the area is a DOC-administered reserve (in partnership with the tangata whenua Ngāi Tai and Ngāti Paoa), visitors may not take dogs or other animals onto the islands.

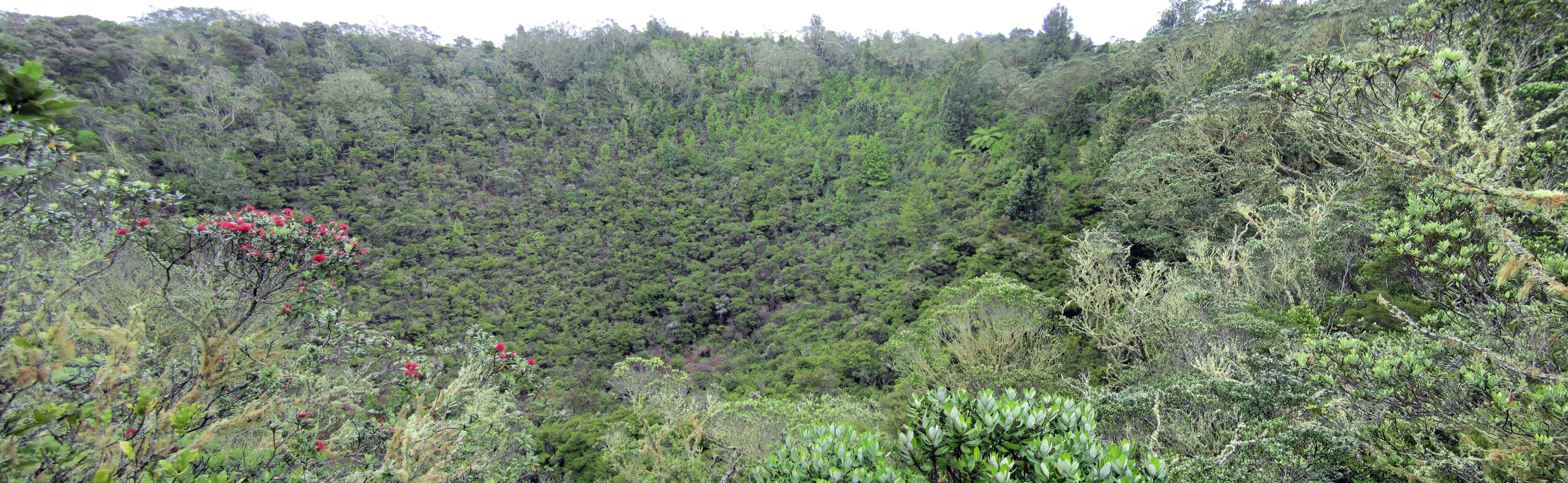
The main vent of Rangitoto Island, now totally forested

== History ==
=== Māori association ===
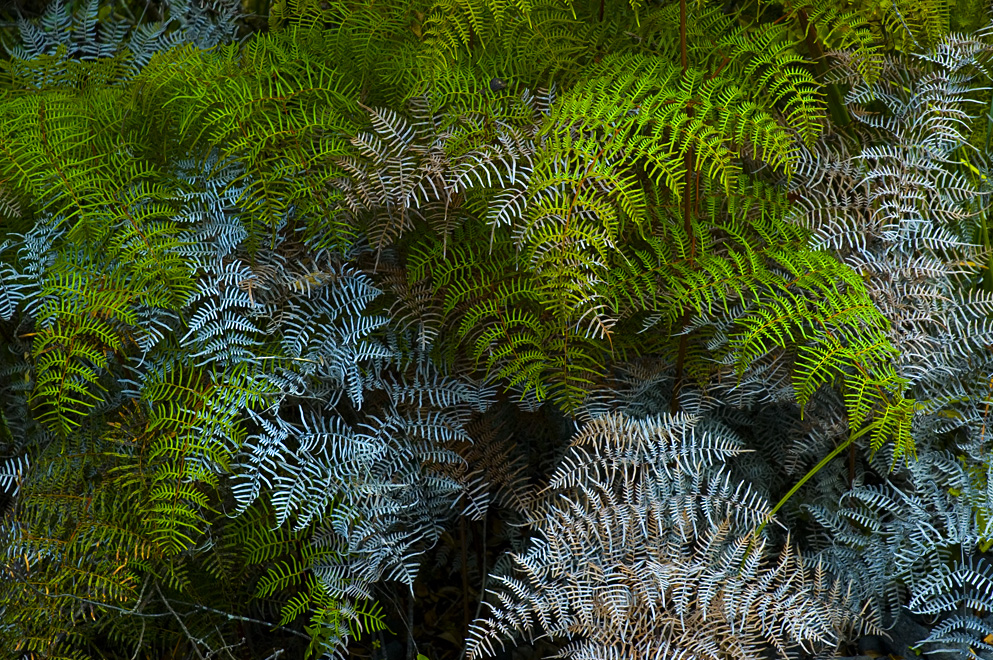
Bracken fern, Pteridium esculentum, Rangitoto Island

The volcano erupted within the historical memory of the local Māori iwi (tribes). Human footprints have been found between layers of Rangitoto volcanic ash on the adjoining Motutapu Island. Ngāi Tai was the iwi living on Motutapu, and considers both islands their ancestral home. Ngāti Paoa also has links with Rangitoto.

The name Rangitoto literally means "red sky", and is linked to a traditional story of a fight between Tama-te-kapua, captain of the Arawa canoe, and Hoturoa, captain of the Tainui canoe. The name Ngā Rangi-i-totongia-a Tama-te-kapua ("The days of the bleeding of Tama-te-kapua") refers to how Tama-te-kapua was injured in the fight. The peaks of the island were known by the names Ngā Pona Toru o Peretū ("The Three Knuckles of Peretū") or Ngā Tuaitara o Taikehu ("The Dorsal Fins of Taikehu"). Ngā Pona Toru o Peretū, often shortened to Peretū is the traditional Ngāi Tai ki Tāmaki name for the three peaks of the island, and was a name given by Taikehu, a captain of the Tainui canoe.

Rangitoto is associated with many traditional stories and myths. One involves Tiriwa (the namesake of the traditional name for the Waitākere Ranges, Te Wao Nui o Tiriwa), a chief of the supernatural Tūrehu people, who uplifted Rangitoto from Karekare on the west coast, as a show of his strength. Others involve a 'tupua' couple, children of the Fire Gods. After quarreling and cursing Mahuika, the fire-goddess, they lost their home on the mainland because it was destroyed by Mataoho, god of earthquakes and eruptions, on Mahuika's behalf. Lake Pupuke on the North Shore was created in the destruction, while Rangitoto rose from the sea. The mists surrounding Rangitoto at certain times are called the tears of the tupua for their former home.

=== Since European colonisation ===
The island was purchased for £15 by the Crown in 1854, very early in New Zealand's colonisation by Europeans, and for many years served as a source of basalt for the local construction industry. It was set aside as a recreation reserve in 1890, and became a favourite spot for daytrippers. Some development occurred nonetheless. In 1892, salt works were created on 5 acres (20,000 m^{2}) near Mackenzies Bay. The wharf and summit road were opened in 1897, with another road linking the summit to Islington Bay by 1900. For over 30 years (from 1898 to 1930), scoria was quarried from near the shoreline on the west side of Islington Bay as building material for Auckland.

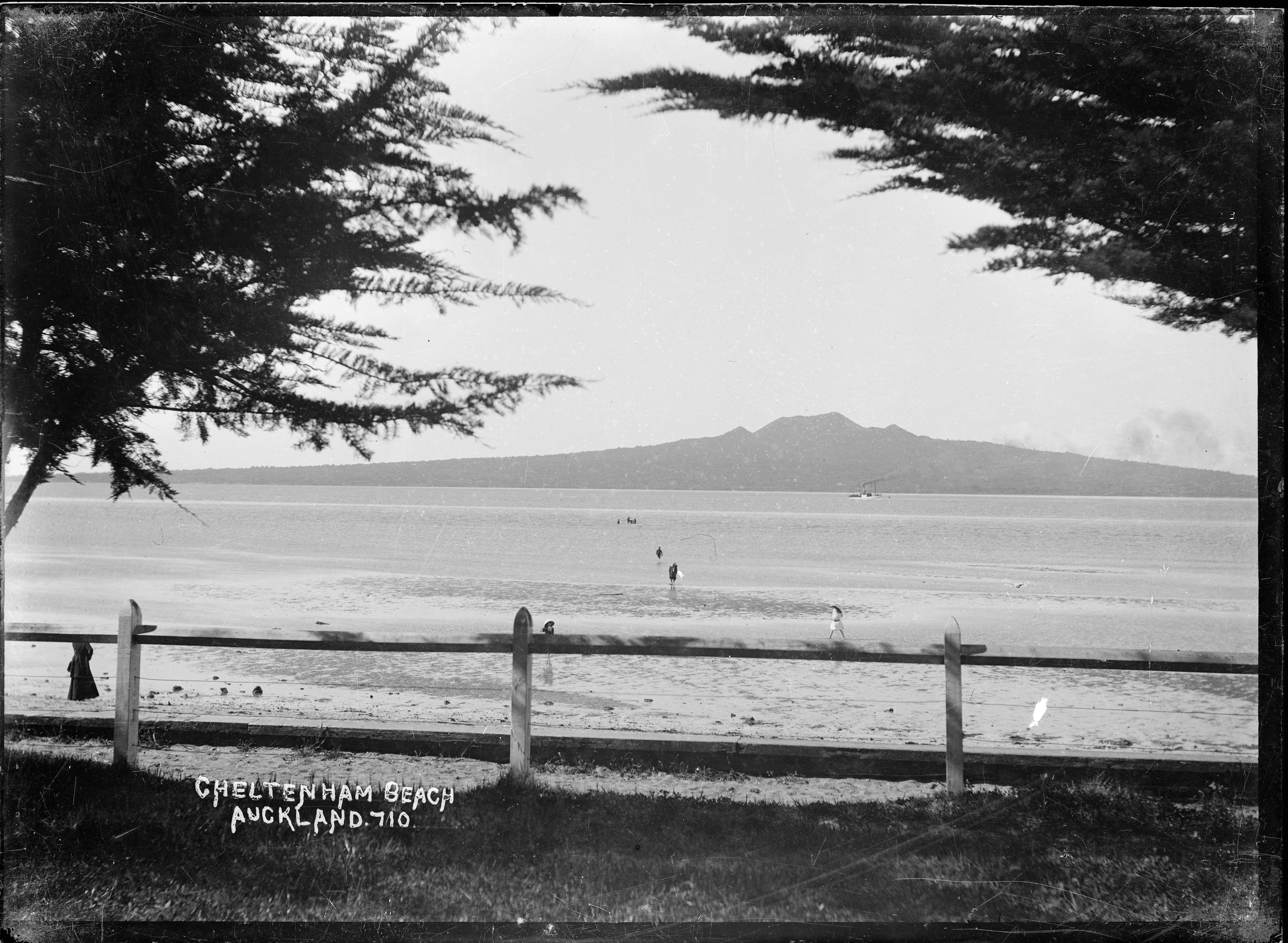
View of Rangitoto Island from Cheltenham Beach, Devonport, c. 1908

From 1925 to 1936, prison labour built roads on the island and a track to the summit. Islington Bay was formed in the southeast area of the island. Formerly known as Drunks Bay, it was used as a drying out area for inebriated crews before they ventured out of the gulf. The bay is used by Auckland boat-owners as a refuge, as it is quite sheltered from the prevailing southwest winds.

Military installations were built during World War II to support the Auckland harbour defences and to house U.S. troops or store mines. The most visited remains of these installations is the old observation post on the summit. The northern shore of the island was used as a wrecking ground for unwanted ships, and the remains of several wrecks are still visible at low tide. At least 13 ships were wrecked from 1887, the last being the former Wellington and, later, Waiheke ferry, Duchess, in June 1947. (built 1897 - iron deck framing remained in 2014). Other ships include Ngapuhi (1900 - her stern remained in 2014), Jubilee (1857), Arapawa (1908), Rothesay Bay (1877), Gladbrook (ex Countess of Anglesea 1877), Elinor Vernon (1876), Polly (ex Skovland 1891), Columbia (1899 - part of the keel and frame remained in 2014), Dartford (1877) and Rarawa (1903 - the bow, framing, iron plating and stern with two propeller shaft housings were visible above the low water mark in 2014).

Baches (small holiday houses) were built around the island's edge in the 1920s and 1930s. The legality of their existence was doubtful from the start and the building of further baches was banned in 1937. Most have since been removed because of the ban and because the island has become a scenic reserve. However, 30 of the 140 baches remain as of 2010, and some are being preserved to show how the island used to be, once boasting a permanent community of several hundred people, including many children. The buildings included some more permanent structures like a seawater pool built of quarried stones by convict labour, located close to the current ferry quay.

== See also ==
- Auckland volcanic field – Volcanic field in New Zealand
- Volcanism of New Zealand – Volcanic activity of New Zealand
- List of volcanoes in New Zealand
- Under the Mountain is a novel, TV series and film set around Rangitoto.
