= 1983 in Spanish television =

This is a list of Spanish television related events in 1983.

== Events ==
- 16 February: Euskal Telebista, Basque Country’s Regional Television channel is launched. It is the first time a Television Network other than the State-owned TVE broadcasts in Spain.
- 23 April: Remedios Amaya and her song Quien maneja mi barca scored nule points at the Eurovision Song Contest 1983 in Munich, being ranked last.
- 23 April: Punk Music band Las Vulpes perform the song Me gusta ser una zorra (I Like Being a Slut) during the show Caja de ritmos, directed and hosted by Carlos Tena. Angry reaction against the lyrics even with political consequences as the issue is studied by the Parliament. The show is cancelled.
- 6 July: Inauguration of TVE new studios in San Cugat del Vallés (Barcelona).
- 21 September: José Luis Balbín is dismissed as Head of the TVE News Department.

== Debuts ==
Title	Channel	Debut	Performers/Host	Genre
Anillos de oro	La 1	1983-10-07	Ana Diosdado	Drama series
Caja de ritmos	La 1	1983-04-09	Carlos Tena	Music
Como lo ves	La 1	1983-10-15	Enrique Miret	Youth
Dentro de un orden	La 1	1983-10-12	Cristina García Ramos	Cultural/Science
El arca de Noé	La 1	1983-10-25	Joaquín Araujo	Documentary
El dominical	La 2	1984-10-09	César Abeytua	Variety show
El jardín de Venus	La 2	1983-10-11	Fernando Fernán Gómez	Drama series
El mayorazgo de Labraz	La 1	1983-05-14	Joaquín Hinojosa	Drama series
Españoles	La 1	1983-04-11	Victoria Prego	Talk show
Esta es mi tierra	La 1	1983-04-13		Documentary
La buena música	La 2	1983-10-05		Music
La Celestina	La 1	1983-10-04	Nuria Torray	Drama series
La Comedia	La 1	1983-10-25		Theatre
La edad de oro	La 2	1983-05-17	Paloma Chamorro	Music
La Tarde	La 1	1983-05-13	Fernando Cubedo	Variety show
Las Cortes de España	La 1	1983-10-08	Florencio Solchaga	News
Las pícaras	La 1	1983-04-08	Amparo Muñoz	Drama series
Lecciones de tocador	La 1	1983-10-06	Rafael Alonso	Drama series
Los desastres de la guerra	La 1	1983-06-06	Sancho Gracia	Drama series
Ni en vivo ni en directo	La 1	1983-04-09	Emilio Aragón	Comedy
Otros pueblos]	La 1	1983-10-09	Luis Pancorbo	Documentary
Puesta a punto	La 2	1983-10-03	Eva Nasarre	Sport
Si yo fuera presidente	La 2	1983-10-11	Fernando García Tola	Talk show
Sonatas	La 1	1983-09-25	Manuel Sierra	Drama series
Taller de Teatro	La 2	1983-12-24		Theatre
Tempo de papel	La 2	1983-06-16	Fanny Rubio	Cultural/Science
Tocata	La 1	1983-10-04	Mercedes Resino	Music
Última frontera	La 2	1983-04-13	Manuel Toharia	Cultural/Science
Últimas preguntas	La 2	1983-10-06	José María Martín Patino	Religion
Un encargo original	La 2	1983-06-25		Theatre
Y sin embargo, te quiero	La 1	1983-09-08	Pastora Vega	Variety show

== Television shows ==
=== La 1 ===
- Telediario (1957– )
- Un, dos, tres... responda otra vez (1972–2004)
- Estudio estadio (1972–2005)
- Informe Semanal (1973– )
- Gente joven (1976–1987)
- Parlamento (1978–2014)
- Vivir cada día (1978–1988)
- Más vale prevenir (1979–1987)
- Barrio Sésamo (1979–2000)
- Consumo (1981–1987)
- ¿Un Mundo feliz? (1981–1987)
- Buenas noches (1982–1984)
- En paralelo (1982–1984)
- Encuentros en libertad (1982–1984)
- Nosotros (1982–1984)
- Usted, por ejemplo (1982–1984)
- Pista libre (1982–1985)
- El Arte de vivir (1982–1987)
- De película (1982–1991)

=== La 2 ===
- Estudio abierto (1970–1985)
- La víspera de nuestro tiempo (1981–1984)
- Al filo de lo imposble (1982– )
- Pueblo de Dios (1982– )
- La Puerta del misterio (1982–1984)

== Ending this year ==
=== La 1 ===
- Revista de toros (1971–1983)
- El gran circo de TVE (1973–1983)
- 300 millones (1977–1983)
- Aplauso (1978–1983)
- Un Mundo para ellos (1979–1983)
- Bla, bla, bla (1981–1983)
- La Cometa blanca (1981–1983)
- El Libro gordo de Petete (1981–1983)
- Sabadabada (1981–1983)
- Su turno (1981–1983)
- Así como suena (1982–1983)
- Esta semana (1982–1983)
- El Juego de los errores (1982–1983)
- Próximamente (1982–1983)
- El Tren, El (1982–1983)
- Verdad o mentira (1982–1983)
- 3, 2, 1... contacto (1982–1983)

=== La 2 ===
- La Clave (1976–1983)
- Musical express (1980–1983)
- Alcores (1981–1983)
- El Carro de la farsa (1981–1983)
- Biblioteca Nacional (1982–1983)
- Evocación (1982–1983)

== Foreign series debuts in Spain ==
English title	Spanish title	Original title	Country	Performers
Battlestar Galactica	Galáctica		USA	Richard Hatch, Dirk Benedict, Lorne Greene
Brideshead Revisited	Retorno a Brideshead		UK	Jeremy Irons, Anthony Andrews
Condominium	La comunidad		USA	Barbara Eden
Cribb	Cribb		UK	Alan Dobie
Empire, Inc.	Imperio		CAN	Kenneth Welsh
Fame	Fama		USA	Debbie Allen, Gene Anthony Ray
Flambards	La mansión Flambards		USA	Christine McKenna
Flamingo Road	Flamingo Road		USA	Morgan Fairchild, Mark Harmon
Flickers	Películas		UK	Bob Hoskins, Frances de la Tour
Ike	Ike		USA	Robert Duvall, Lee Remick
Love for Lydia	Los amores de Lydia		UK	Mel Martin
Marco Polo	Marco Polo		USA ITA	Ken Marshall
M*A*S*H	MASH		USA	Alan Alda
Never the Twain	Dos en discordia		UK	Donald Sinden, Windsor Davies
Once Upon a Time... Space	Érase una vez... el espacio	Il était une fois... l'Espace	FRA	
Only When I Laugh	Sólo cuando me río		UK	James Bolam
Seeing Things	Un sexto sentido		CAN	Louis Del Grande
That's Incredible!	Esto es increíble		USA	John Davidson
The Agatha Christie Hour	La hora de Agatha Christie		UK	
The Coral Island	La isla del coral		UK AUS	Nicholas Bond-Owen
The Littl' Bits	Belfy y Lillibit	Mori no Yōki na Kobitotachi	JAP	
The Little World of Don Camillo	El pequeño mundo de Don Camilo		UK	Mario Adorf, Brian Blessed
The Mézga Family	Las aventuras de la familia Mezga	Mézga család	HUN	
The Paul Hogan Show	El show de Paul Hogan		AUS	Paul Hogan
The Seven Dials Mystery	El misterio de las siete esferas		UK	John Gielgud
The Smurfs	Los Pitufos		La 1	USA
Thomas & Sarah	Thomas y Sarah		UK	Pauline Collins, John Alderton
Tom, Dick and Harriet	Tom, Dick y Harriet		UK	Ian Ogilvy, Lionel Jeffries, Brigit Forsyth
Under the Mountain	Bajo la montaña		NZL	Roy Leywood
Why Didn't They Ask Evans?	¿Por qué no lo preguntaron a Evans?		UK	Francesca Annis

== Births ==
- 2 January – Lidia San José, actress
- 21 January – Paula Prendes, actress & hostess.
- 9 February – Celia Freijeiro, actress
- 10 February – Nagore Robles, hostess & pundit
- 16 June – Verónica Echegui, actress
- 4 July – Miguel Ángel Muñoz, actor & singer
- 22 July – Álex Gadea, actor
- 5 September – Patricia Pardo, hostess
- 7 November – Alberto Casado, host
- 30 November – Carla Nieto, actress

== Deaths ==
- 17 December – José Orjas, actor, 77
- Tota Alba, actress, 68

== See also ==
- 1983 in Spain
- List of Spanish films of 1983
