= The Third Eye (American TV series) =

- Country of origin: United States

Production
- Running time: 1 hour

Original release
- Network: Nickelodeon
- Release: January 8, 1983 – 1984

The Third Eye is an American anthology series on Nickelodeon. It consisted of multiple English-language science fiction serials from the United Kingdom and New Zealand. All of the program's featurettes focused on characters with psychic abilities.

== History ==
The Third Eye premiered on Nickelodeon on January 8, 1983. It usually begins with a disclaimer that said, "The following is a science fiction program, and may contain some startling scenes. This show is intended for older children." The intro was shown with voice-over by Don LaFontaine saying, "Somewhere in the crowd... sometimes you find someone very special. Someone who hears the unheard. Someone who understands the mystery. Sometimes, there's someone who sees with the third eye!" Initially, three serials were shown as part of the program: Into the Labyrinth, The Haunting of Cassie Palmer, and Under the Mountain. In April 1983, a fourth serial (Children of the Stones) was added. The fifth and final serial to be aired as part of the series was The Witches and the Grinnygog. Described by Nickelodeon president Geraldine Laybourne as part of a confusing "checkerboard schedule", The Third Eye was pulled from Nickelodeon's lineup so that the network could focus on original series.

In 1984, film historian Aljean Harmetz stated that Nickelodeon acquired the program's presentations "for a pittance" because their relatively low production values and their actors' foreign accents made them "unacceptable" to other networks.

== Series within the anthology ==
=== The Haunting of Cassie Palmer ===
In The Haunting of Cassie Palmer, the title protagonist, the daughter of a medium, decides to see if she has inherited her mother's powers. She tries to conjure up a spirit, with unexpected results. By the end of the series, her powers have burned out. Adapted from the book by Vivien Alcock.

=== Under the Mountain ===
Twins Rachel and Theo Matheson have limited telepathic abilities and can wield light as a weapon. Aided by the mysterious alien Mr. Jones, they must defeat an evil alien who lives Under the Mountain of Rangitoto Island. Their main power, though, is a psychic bond with two stones from another world which are used as weapons, and (it is strongly implied) may be sentient life forms. Adapted from the book by Maurice Gee.

=== Children of the Stones ===
Adam Brake and his son Matthew move to the small village of Milbury, where they discover many of the locals seem to exist in a trance-like state. The strange goings on have some connection with the ancient stone circle that surrounds the village.

=== Into the Labyrinth ===
Phil Church and siblings Terry and Helen (no surname given) are bestowed borrowed power by the sorcerer Rothgo and they are sent Into the Labyrinth. They are able to communicate with Rothgo telepathically throughout time. They are also given individual powers: Phil channels Rothgo's powers in challenging the tyrant Cynon; Helen is able to release all prisoners of Masrur (Belor in disguise); and Terry is given command of a genie in the same episode "Masrur." At the end of the series, Rothgo alters time so that Terry, Helen and Phil never go on their journey, but they are given souvenirs (presumably nidus fragments). Two more series of seven episodes each of "Into the Labyrinth" aired in the UK, but not on Nickelodeon.

=== The Witches and the Grinnygog ===
When an ancient English church is moved to a new site in The Witches and the Grinnygog, one stone - a strange statue, the Grinnygog of the title - is found to be missing. Its accidental rediscovery (by a woman who, not realising its significance, gives it to her elderly father as a pseudo garden gnome) coincides with the arrival in the same town of three eccentric old women who seem to be looking for something lost or hidden many years before, and a nervous, "other-worldly" child. The townsfolk find themselves looking into their collective past but it takes a group of children to put the pieces of the puzzle together and make amends for an ancient injustice. Adapted from the book by Dorothy Edwards.
