= Lufodo Academy of Performing Arts =

Nigerian film academy

Lufodo Academy of Performing Arts is a Nigerian film academy situated in Ikoyi, Lagos State, Nigeria. It was founded by Joke Silva and Olu Jacobs in 2012.

== Background ==
Lufodo Academy of Performing Arts was selected as part of Nigerian Cultural Expressions at the 2012 Summer Olympics where they presented 3 full-length plays (Wole Soyinka’s The Lion and the Jewel, Fred Agbeyegbe's The King must dance naked and Sefi Atta’s A Naming Ceremony), a mini film festival as well as a mini poetry festival.

In January 2022, the Lagos State Government handed over the management of Glover Memorial Hall to Lufodo.

== Program ==
The academy issues a NBTE National Certificate in Acting after students complete their program and casts them in a film or theatre production.

== Notable alumni ==
- Kaylah Oniwo, Nigerian actress
- Ebinabo Potts-Johnson, Nigerian model and actress

== Notable faculty ==
- Kemi Akindoju, Nigerian actress - facilitator
- Joke Silva, Nigerian actress - director of studies
