= Leon Wadham =

New Zealand actor, writer and director

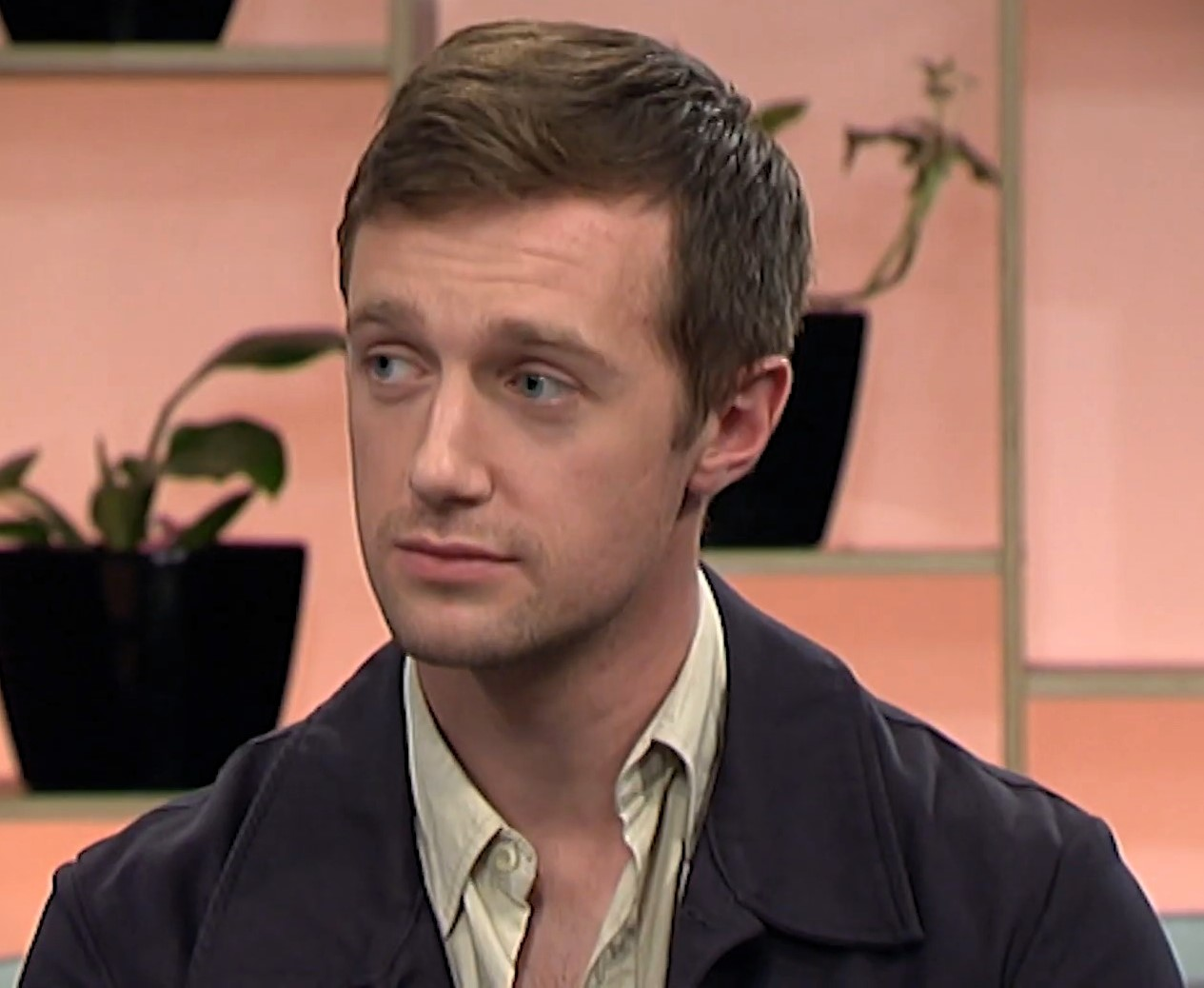
- Wadham in 2018
- Born: 1989 (age 36–37); Wellington, New Zealand
- Education: Toi Whakaari
- Occupations: Actor, writer, director
- Years active: 2000–present

Leon Wadham (born 1989) is a New Zealand actor, writer, and director. He is best known for his roles in the film Under the Mountain (2009), comedy series Go Girls (2013) and as Kemen in the Amazon Prime fantasy show The Lord of the Rings: The Rings of Power (2022–present).

== Early life ==
Wadham was born and raised in Karori, Wellington, New Zealand. He attended Karori Normal School and Onslow College. He studied at Toi Whakaari Drama School from 2009 to 2011, graduating with a bachelor's degree in Performing Arts (Acting). He also received the Museum Art Hotel Scholarship Award in his final year of training.

== Career ==
Wadham started acting at a young age, and made his on-screen debut in 2000, appearing in a guest role in the sci-fi series The Tribe. After finishing his education he also went on to become a filmmaker. He wrote and directed several short films, TV shows and plays starting from 2013.

In 2009, Wadham starred as Ricky in the fantasy film Under the Mountain, which was based on the novel of the same name. In 2013, he joined the main cast of the fifth season of comedy drama Go Girls, where he played the role of Levi Hirsh. He appeared in a supporting role in the 2019 crime drama The Bad Seed.

In 2020, he was cast in the Amazon Prime TV series The Lord of the Rings: The Rings of Power, which premiered in 2022. He plays Kemen, Pharazôn's son, who was invented for the series.

== Personal life ==
As of 2022, Wadham resided in Auckland, New Zealand. In 2023, he moved to London, England.

== Filmography ==
=== Film ===
Year	Title	Role	Notes
2007	Maintain	Mark	
2008	Jack & Jill	Jack	Short film
2008	Unorthodox My Balance Sheet	The Assistant	Short film
2009	Under the Mountain	Ricky	
2009	Monkeys Don't Mix	Inmate #1	Short film
2012	A Bend in the Road	Dave	Short film
2012	The Catch	SPCA Agent	Short film
2012	Wellington	Noel	Short film
2012	Packed	Alex	
2013	Shopping	Fresh Face	
2013	Blankets	Jack	Short film
2014	School Night	–	Short film; writer and director
2016	Moving	–	Short film; writer and director
2017	Pork Pie	Young Cop	
2020	Weirdoes	Driver	

=== Television ===
Year	Title	Role	Notes
2000	The Tribe	–	1 episode
2001	Dark Knight	Tom	Series 2, episode 5: "Black Tree"
2013	Sunny Skies	–	Writer
2013	Go Girls	Levi Hirsh	
2014	Pirates of the Airwaves	Paul Lineham	Television film
2015	When We Go to War	Guy Weatherstone	
2016	Terry Teo	Jasper La Roux	Series 1, episode 4: "Head to Head"
2017	Why Does Love?	Adam Holt	Television film
2018	The Brokenwood Mysteries	Darryn Walker	Series 5, episode 2: "Bride Not to Be"
2019	Power Rangers Beast Morphers	Lab Assistant	Series 1, episode 1: "Beasts Unleashed"
2019	Roman Empire	Gemellus	Series 3, episode 2: "A New Hope"
2019	The Bad Seed	Matt Logan	
2019–2020	Golden Boy	–	Director
2020	The Citizen's Handbook	–	Director
2020–2022	Alice Snedden's Bad News	–	Writer and director
2022–present	The Lord of the Rings: The Rings of Power	Kemen	

=== Stage ===
Year	Title	Role	Venue	Ref.
2000	Nuncrackers	–	Stetson Productions	
2001	Rush	Singer/Dancer	Capital Theatre Productions	
2007	The Cape	Jordyn	Circa Theatre	
2007	The Henchmen	Captain Caffeine	Young and Hungry	
2007	Brain Power	Self Preservation	Out of Bounds	
2012	Tribes	Billy	Silo Theatre / Q Theatre, Auckland	
2013	Lord of the Flies	Ralph	Auckland Theatre Company / Maidment Theatre	
2018	Giddy	Solo	Basement Theatre	
