= Roy Leywood =

- Occupation: Radio producer & Actor
- Years active: 1956–1989
- Works: Under the Mountain; Erebus: The Aftermath

Roy Leywood is a New Zealand actor, director, and radio producer who began his career in the 1950s working on New Zealand radio dramas.

== Radio career ==
He began his career in 1956 directing radio plays for the Wellington Repertory Theatre. One of his earlier works was "The Desperate Hours" which was broadcast between 28 April and 2 May 1959. He later produced and directed "Radio Play #137" which was broadcast on 3 November 1965. During the broadcast, Leywood was the director for the segment "The Cause of Something", written by Stephen Rose. Leywood would also star in the Australian radio show "The Frigate Captain", a fifteen-minute multi-part series, in which Leywood played the character of "Doctor Guthrie".

One of his last known radio works was as a voice actor on the radio program "Voices of Gallipoli".

== Television ==
In 1981, Leywood starred in his first television appearance, appearing as the kind and wise "Mr. Jones" in the children's mini-series Under the Mountain. The show was popular in New Zealand and later re-broadcast in 1983 as part of the American television series The Third Eye on Nickelodeon. In 2009, the series was remade into a feature film in which the character of Mr. Jones was played by Sam Neill.

Roy Leywood later starred in a television episode of "Both Sides of the Fence" and in 1988 appeared in the mini-series Erebus: The Aftermath.
