= The Witches and the Grinnygog (TV series) =

- Created by: Roy Russell
- Directed by: Diarmuid Lawrence
- Starring: Patricia Hayes; Adam Woodyatt; Anna Wing; John Barrard; Olu Jacobs
- Composer: James Harpham
- Country of origin: United Kingdom
- Original language: English
- No. of seasons: 1
- No. of episodes: 6

Production
- Executive producer: Anna Home
- Running time: 25 minutes
- Production company: TVS

Original release
- Network: ITV
- Release: 14 November – 19 December 1983

The Witches and the Grinnygog is a British television serial that was first aired in 1983. The story was adapted from the book The Witches and the Grinnygog by Dorothy Edwards and was aired as a six-part television serial produced by Television South for ITV and subsequently re-broadcast in the US, Canada, New Zealand, and Israel.

== Summary ==
A strange statue (the Grinnygog), which fell off the back of a truck carrying stones of an old church for relocation, is discovered by a woman on her way home from the store. The woman takes the statue home and gives it to her elderly father as a garden ornament.

The family who now has possession of the Grinnygog, in particular one small boy, begin to experience strange feelings of euphoria and a desire to participate in folk magic rituals. At the same time, a nervous, "other-worldly" child begins to be seen around the town and appears lost and frightened. Meanwhile, three eccentric older women arrive in the town and appear to be searching for something. They bring with them the "daughter" of one of the women, later revealed to be a mannequin, but which at one point appears to be walking by itself.

The story eventually reveals that the three women are witches from England's 17th century who escaped a witch-hunt by somehow slipping through time into the modern age. The Grinnygog, which was an image of the Horned God, had lain dormant until being removed from the church, when it summoned the witches to the present day. One of the witches is now looking for her daughter who was separated during a witch-burning held hundreds of years ago in the town. The daughter escaped by slipping through time, but only intermittently, and is now lost without her mother.

The presence of the witches, and their relationship to the Grinnygog, is eventually worked out by a group of children who investigate their town's local history and discover that the town must make amends for the ancient injustice of witch-burning. One clue is revealed through an old manuscript written by a town elder who apparently heard of the witch-burning from his elderly servant and wrote an account of the event in a journal: however, he died before revealing the final clue about the escaped witches. Another clue is the arrival of an African witch doctor, named Mr. Alabaster, who is seeking out the witches to help them. The story ends with the witches reunited with the daughter and taken away by Mr. Alabaster to someplace where they will be safe, along with the Grinnygog.

== Production ==
The TV series was filmed in and around Titchfield and Bishop's Waltham, Hampshire. It was adapted by Roy Russell and directed by Diarmuid Lawrence, with music by James Harpham. It was shown on Nickelodeon in the United States as part of the anthology series The Third Eye.

No.	Directed by	Original release date
1	Diarmuid Lawrence	14 November 1983
2	Diarmuid Lawrence	21 November 1983
3	Diarmuid Lawrence	28 November 1983
4	Diarmuid Lawrence	5 December 1983
5	Diarmuid Lawrence	12 December 1983
6	Diarmuid Lawrence	19 December 1983

== Cast ==
The Children

- Jimmy Firkettle - Paul Curtis
- Essie Firkettle - Zoe Loftin
- Dave Firkettle - Adam Woodyatt
- Colin Sogood - Giles Harper
- Nan Sogood - Heidi Mayo

The Witches

- Mrs. Ems - Sheila Grant
- Edie Possett - Anna Wing
- Miss Bendybones - Patricia Hayes
- Margaret "Daisy" Ems - Eva Griffith

The Adults

- Reverend Anthony Sogood - Robert Swann
- Granddad Adams - John Barrard
- Mrs. Firkettle - Jane Wood
- Twebele Alabaster - Olu Jacobs
- Miss Possett - Anne Dyson

Other Characters

- Patrick Flanagan - Liam O'Callaghan
- Flanagan's mate - Gary Hailes
- Major Gilmour - Alan Rowe
- Old Peggy - George Malpas
- Mrs. Featherly - Hilda Fenemore
- News Interviewer - Carolyn Courage
- Shop Customer - Heather Tobias
- Bus Driver - Tariq Yunus

== Song ==
There is a song featured in episode 4 of the series that is sung by the Granddad and the children. The lyrics are taken from the original book by Dorothy Edwards where it refers to the ‘la-las’ as being in place of forgotten words. No explanation of the meaning of the song is given. The book contains a few more lines than the TV adaptation which is sung to a memorable, evocative melody, which is repeated as the end credits. The composer who worked on the series is listed in the episode credits as James Harpham. Lyrics of the song as sung in episode 4 are as follows:

“Great Hern would horn,

‘Fore I was born.

Flash green and grin the round,

Up besom fly,

Tra-la-la la-la-la”

== Availability ==
There has been no domestic commercial release of the series on any format in the UK. This is possibly due to ongoing rights issues after the production company, TVS, dropped out of the ITV network in 1992 and subsequently went through a number of take-overs. This problem affects the majority of the TVS programme archive as much of the original production paperwork and sales documentation has been lost during the intervening years and current owners, The Walt Disney Company, appear to have little or no interest in these programmes.
