= Bill Johnson (New Zealand actor) =

New Zealand actor

William Johnson (1924 – 23 September 2016) was an actor from New Zealand who is best known to American audiences as portraying "Mr. Wilberforce" in the 1981 TV series Under the Mountain. Johnson would also appear in a cameo as "Mr. Carpenter" in the 2009 Under the Mountain film remake. In his later career he co-starred in the film The Water Horse: Legend of the Deep and appeared in a brief supporting role in the 2005 version of King Kong.

Johnson was born in Hebden Bridge, Great Britain, in 1924. He began his career in the 1960s making films for the company Kiwi Screens. After four decades of acting, Bill Johnson died at the age of 92 on 23 September 2016.
