= Vivien Alcock =

English writer

- Born: 23 September 1924; Worthing, Sussex, England
- Died: 11 October 2003 (aged 79)
- Occupation: Writer
- Known for: Children's fiction
- Spouse: Leon Garfield

Vivien Alcock (23 September 1924 – 11 October 2003) was an English writer of children's books.

== Life and career ==
Alcock was born in Worthing, now in West Sussex, England, and her family moved to Devizes in Wiltshire when she was ten years old. She was the youngest of three sisters who were devoted to reading, drawing, and storytelling. Alcock studied at Oxford University's Ruskin School of Drawing until 1942, when she left the program to join the women's branch of the British Army (Auxiliary Territorial Service).

Alcock and Leon Garfield met while she was driving ambulances in Belgium. They married and adopted a daughter, named Jane after Jane Austen. Garfield became a successful children's writer in the 1960s.

Her own first book published was The Haunting of Cassie Palmer, from Methuen in 1980 when she was 56 years old. She followed The Haunting with The Stonewalkers (1981) and about twenty others. The Cuckoo Sister (1985) and The Monster Garden (1988) are her two most widely held works as catalogued by WorldCat libraries.

== Published writings ==
- The Haunting of Cassie Palmer (1980) (Note: The semi-monthly American journal Kirkus Reviews covered at least nine books by Alcock. Reviews of the first US edition should be expected, and edition publication dates are usually reported. As posted 2010 or so, the reviews are commonly undated and commonly accompanied by cover images or ISBN of later editions. Google web search reports Kirkus coverage of eight among Alcock's ten "Most widely held works" in WorldCat libraries, as catalogued online to date; all except The Sylvia Game and Travellers by Night.) – produced as a 1981 TV series of the same name
- The Stonewalkers (1981) – also produced as an audio cassette
- The Sylvia Game (1982)
- Travellers by Night (1983)
- Ghostly Companions: A Feast of Chilling Tales (1984) – includes "A Change of Aunts" (1984)
- The Cuckoo Sister (1985)
- Wait and See (1986)
- The Mysterious Mr. Ross (1987)
- A Kind of Thief (1988)
- The Monster Garden (1988)
- The Thing in the Woods (1989)
- The Trial of Anna Cotman (1989)
- The Dancing Bush (1991)
- Singer to the Sea God (1992)
- Othergran (1993)
- The Face at the Window (1994); US ed., Stranger at the Window (1998)
- The Wrecker (1994)
- Time Wreck (1996); US ed., The Red-Eared Ghosts (1997)
- The Silver Egg (1997)
- A Gift on a String (1998)
- Ticket to Heaven (2000)
- The Boy Who Swallowed a Ghost (2001)

== Awards and honours ==
- Best science fiction/fantasy book, Voice of Youth Advocates, 1988, The Monster Garden
- Carnegie Medal, shortlist, The Trial of Anna Cotman
- Notable Books for Children, American Library Association: 1985 Travellers by Night, 1986 The Cuckoo Sister, 1988 The Monster Garden
- Horn Book Honor List, The Horn Book Magazine: 1985 Travellers by Night
- Horn Book Fanfare Best Books of the Year: 1989 The Monster Garden, 1993 A Kind of Thief
