= John Barrard =

English actor (1924–2013)

- John Barrard in Keeping Up Appearances in 1993
- Born: Jacob Koppel Isaacson; 12 September 1924; Cape Town, Cape Province, Union of South Africa
- Died: 13 October 2013 (aged 89); London, England
- Occupation: Actor
- Spouse: Barbara Josephine Everett (m. 1957; died 1987)

John Barrard (12 September 1924 – 13 October 2013) was a British character actor who had a career spanning five decades and who perhaps is best known for playing Dooley, Santa's No. 2, in Santa Claus: The Movie (1985).

== Career ==
Barrard's television appearances include the Concierge in The Count of Monte Cristo (1956), Gatekeeper in an episode of Armchair Theatre (1956), George in The Larkins (1958), Napoleon in The Army Game (1960), Carlos the Pedlar in The Saint (1962), Milo in Ghost Squad (1964), the Shopkeeper in the Doctor Who story The Reign of Terror (1964) and two roles in Coronation Street; Harry Mascall in 1972 and Sidney Wilson in 1974. Before these roles he appeared in the Coronation Street spin-off Pardon the Expression (1965). Other appearances included Ludo McAllister in Dr. Finlay's Casebook (1965), Sid Seaton in Softly, Softly (1966), Arnold Maddox in The Troubleshooters (1966), Mr Craddock in Crossroads (1967), Harris in Public Eye (1968), Valarti in The Avengers (1969), Sir Bruce Ingoe in Callan (1969), King of Diamonds in Here Come the Double Deckers! (1970), Mr Whitfield in Doctor at Large (1971), Shop Assistant in Budgie (1972) and Mr Forbes/Mr Finch in The Fenn Street Gang (1971–1972).

Further television credits included Gem Setter in The Protectors (1972), Pilkington in Follyfoot (1973), Lionel in The Growing Pains of PC Penrose (1975), Chauffeur in The Sweeney (1976), Mr Oliver in Survivors (1977) Judge Lambsfoot in Dick Turpin (1980), Scruffy Man in The Professionals (1980), Dr Losborne in Oliver Twist (1982), Jonathon Hopper in Whoops Apocalypse (1982), Mr Barraclough/Executive in Metal Mickey (1980–1982), Lapsley/Josie's Dad in Last of the Summer Wine (1976–1983), Mr Adam in The Witches and the Grinnygog (1983), the Retired Morris Dancer in The Black Seal episode of The Black Adder (1983), Guido in Ellis Island (1984), Old Mr Brooks in We'll Think of Something (1986), Arkroyd in Never the Twain (1986–1987), Bernie in Terry and June (1987), Oskar Friedman in War and Remembrance (1989), Harold Wharton in an early episode of the sitcom One Foot in the Grave (1990), Anatole in Jeeves and Wooster (1990), Mr Pebbles in Sean's Show (1992), Baths Attendant in Minder (1993), a houseowner in an episode of Keeping Up Appearances (1993), Norman Spencer/Mr Jeffries in The Bill (1989–1999), Stamp Collector in Mr. Bean (1994), Security Guard in As Time Goes By (2000) and Mr Taylor in Doctors (2002).

Barrad's film roles included the Taxidermist in The Man Who Knew Too Much (1956), Lennie Ross in Cover Girl Killer (1959), Small Man in Peeping Tom (1960), There Was a Crooked Man (1960), Honeydew in The Primitives (1962), Consul in We Joined the Navy (1962), Zebra Man in Don't Raise the Bridge, Lower the River (1968), Wedding Guest in Crossplot (1969), Patron in Our Miss Fred (1972), Blind Man in Tales from the Crypt (1972), Benjamite Elder in King David (1985), Dooley in Santa Claus: The Movie (1985), Walter in Buster (1988) and Old Man in Swinging with the Finkels (2011).

Theatre appearances included The Tenth Man (1961) at the Comedy Theatre.

== Personal life ==
For thirty years, Barrard was married to Barbara Josephine Everett, a physiologist and lecturer at Central London Polytechnic.

Barrard was the Chairman of the North West London branch of the actors' union Equity. He was cremated at Golders Green Crematorium on 17 October 2013 and his ashes were interred at the Golders Green Jewish Cemetery in May 2014.

== Filmography ==
=== Film ===
Year	Title	Role	Notes
1956	The Man Who Knew Too Much	Taxidermist	Uncredited
1959	Cover Girl Killer	Lennie Ross	
1960	Peeping Tom	Small Man	Uncredited
1960	There Was a Crooked Man		
1962	The Primitives	Honeydew	
1962	We Joined the Navy	Consul	
1968	Don't Raise the Bridge, Lower the River	Zebra Man	
1969	Crossplot	Wedding guest #6	
1972	Tales from the Crypt	Blind Man	(segment 5 "Blind Alleys"), Uncredited
1972	Our Miss Fred	Patron	
1985	King David	Benjamite Elder	
1985	Santa Claus: The Movie	Dooley	
1988	Buster	Walter	
2011	Swinging with the Finkels	Old Man	(final film role)

=== Television ===
Year	Title	Role	Notes
1979	Leave it to Charlie	Mr. Philpotts	Episode: "Guess Who's Coming to Dinner"
