= Cover Girl Killer =

1959 British film by Terry Bishop

- Theatrical poster
- Directed by: Terry Bishop
- Screenplay by: Terry Bishop
- Produced by: Jack Parsons
- Starring: Harry H. Corbett; Felicity Young; Victor Brooks
- Cinematography: Gerald Gibbs
- Edited by: John Trumper
- Music by: William Davies
- Production company: Parroch Films
- Distributed by: Eros Films
- Release date: 26 September 1959
- Running time: 61 minutes
- Country: United Kingdom
- Language: English

Cover Girl Killer is a 1959 black and white British 'B' thriller film written and directed by Terry Bishop and starring Harry H. Corbett, Felicity Young, Victor Brooks and Spencer Teakle.

== Plot ==
In London, a cover girl model is found dead, dressed and posed as she appeared on the front cover of Wow magazine. The police uncover the connection, and learn from the magazine's owner, Johnny Mason, an archaeologist who has just inherited the magazine from his uncle, that another recently deceased girl also posed for the magazine. Investigating, the police discover that three cover girls have died, each dressed in the same outfit in which they appeared in the magazine. All the women have died from overdoses, put down as suicides, but the police discover an injection mark under the latest girl's fingernail. They try to contact the young model from the following edition, but it is too late; the killer has already arranged to meet her to photograph her for an advertising campaign. However, he loses control when she begins to suspect something is wrong, and strangles her.

The killer is "Mr Spendoza", a middle-aged man who wears thick glasses, a toupee and a raincoat that make him easily memorable in disguise, yet difficult to identify without them.

The police try to track down the killer and have several suspects. Posing variously as an advertising executive and a film and TV producer, the murderer eludes capture whilst continuing to lure his victims to their deaths one by one. He is motivated by what he sees as the moral corruption of the girls.

Spendoza goes to the police giving his name as Fairchild and gives them a false lead which he says connects to one of his tenants, Mr Spurling. He gives a description close to Spendoza's, emphasising his need for glasses. However, Fairchild does not wear glasses.

Johnny tells the police the models are refusing to pose for the cover due to the murders. Inspector Brunner, in charge of the case, says that the killer will not stop murdering, and will be harder to catch if they do not have the magazine connection to help them. June, Johnny's girlfriend, volunteers to model, with the police covertly guarding her, in order to catch the killer. They plan to lure him to a theatre and burlesque show.

Meanwhile, Spendoza (without glasses and under another alias) goes to a theatrical agent and hires an actor who looks like his alter ego to further throw the police off track by turning up at the theatre for an appointment with June. Believing they have caught the killer, the police take the actor to the police station, leaving one officer to guard June. He is attacked by the murderer and June is alone with the killer.

== Cast ==
- Harry H. Corbett as The Man (on-screen credit; Spendoza/Fournier/Marr/Fairchild/Spurling/Spiller are not mentioned)
- Felicity Young as June Rawson
- Spencer Teakle as John Mason
- Victor Brooks as Inspector Brunner
- Bernadette Milnes as Gloria Starke
- Christina Gregg as Joy Adams
- Tony Doonan as Sergeant
- John Barrard as Lennie Ross
- Charles Lloyd-Pack as Captain Adams
- Alan Edwards as Hodgkins
- Dermot Kelly as Pop
- Denis Holmes as actor
- Julie Shearing as Rosie
- Tony Thawnton as doctor
- Paddy Joyce as stagehand
- Claude Jones as Constable Jones
- John Baker as plainclothes man

== Production ==
The film was made at Walton Studios in Walton-on-Thames, Surrey, England, and on location in London.

== Reception ==
The Monthly Film Bulletin wrote: "A largely unknown cast acquit themselves well as particularly Harry H. Corbett as the psychopathic killer as in a thriller presented with a certain lightness of touch, at least in the earlier stages, which makes it a less sordid piece than the plot might suggest".

Kine Weekly said: "The plot's a bit theatrical and both the acting and direction are uneven, but the macabre is, nevertheless, logically punctuated with striptease, and the finale grips".

Picture Show rated the film "poor", giving it 1/5 stars, writing: "Amateurish crime drama. ... Of little entertainment value."

Leslie Halliwell reviewed the film as "Good unpretentious second feature with plenty of suspense".

The Radio Times Guide to Films gave the film 3/5 stars, writing: "Apart from a handful of low-budget movies, writer/director Terry Bishop spent much of his career in TV, which would appear to have been the British cinema's loss if this clipped little thriller is anything to go by. The dialogue does strike a false note every now and then, but Bishop succeeds in re-creating a world of tawdry glamour that is a far cry from the glitz of today's supermodels as a serial killer targets a magazine's pin-ups."

In The British 'B' Film, Chibnall and McFarlane write that the film "looks pretty ridiculous beside such contemporary treatments of the theme as Psycho and Peeping Tom (both 1960), but in its breathless naiveté it is highly evocative of a key moment of transition in British attitudes towards sexual display".

In British Sound Films: The Studio Years 1928–1959 David Quinlan rated the film as "average", writing: "Plenty of suspense for a minor thriller."

Kim Newman, writing in Sight and Sound, called the film: "astonishing but unthrilling."

== In popular culture ==
Frankie Goes to Hollywood paraphrased dialogue from the film in their No.1 single "Two Tribes" (1984) as "Are we living in a land where sex and horror are the new gods?". The original dialogue in the film is "Surely sex and horror are the new gods in this polluted world of so-called entertainment?" (spoken by Mr Fairchild at 48:28).

== DVD release ==
Cover Girl Killer was released on Region 2 DVD on 11 October 2010.
