= Plumb (novel series) =

New Zealand novel trilogy

The Plumb trilogy
- Plumb; Meg; Sole Survivor
- Author: Maurice Gee
- Language: New Zealand English
- Genre: Family saga
- Publisher: Faber and Faber (London); Oxford University Press and Penguin Books (New Zealand); St Martin's Press (New York)
- Published: 1978–1983

The Plumb trilogy is a series of three novels written by New Zealand author Maurice Gee: Plumb (1978), Meg (1981), and Sole Survivor (1983). The trilogy follows the lives of a New Zealand family across three generations, exploring the impacts of history, politics and religion on the family, and has been described by New Zealand writers and literary critics as one of the greatest achievements in New Zealand literature.

== Background and overview ==
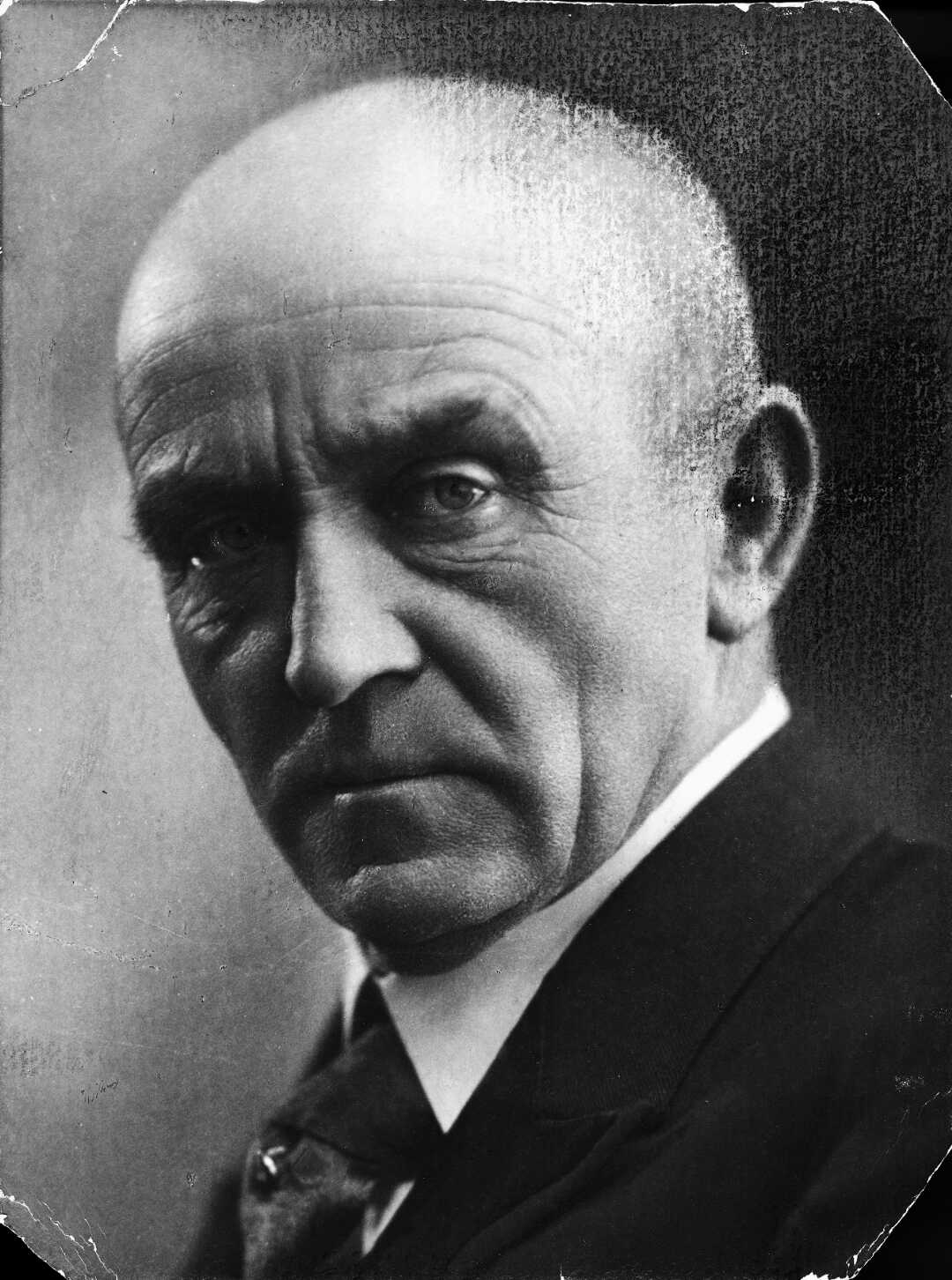
Gee's grandfather James Chapple, the inspiration for the character George Plumb

Gee began writing Plumb in 1976, at age 45, after moving from Auckland to Nelson with his wife and family and earning a Literary Fund Scholarship that allowed him to begin writing full-time. He had wanted to write a novel about his grandfather, controversial Presbyterian minister James Chapple, for many years. The character George Plumb is closely based on Chapple, particularly his early life, his trials for heresy and seditious utterance and subsequent imprisonment, although Gee gave Plumb "three months more in jail" because "14 months seemed to fit better into my time scheme than 11 months". In the author's note to the novel, Gee further explains that Plumb's character, career, opinions, and early life with his wife, are much like his grandfather's own history, but that Plumb's domestic life and children are "largely imaginary".

The first novel is narrated by the eighty-year-old George Plumb, not in chronological order but by looking back through his own memories, and covering the 1890s to the 1940s. He is a Presbyterian clergyman with an unyielding and stern personality and a strong belief in his own principles, who becomes a pacifist and rationalist, and he and his late wife Edie had twelve children. His beliefs lead to sacrifices being made both by himself and his family, and to a fractured relationship with his children. The second novel, Meg, is narrated by George's youngest daughter Meg (based on Gee's own mother), and is a coming of age or Bildungsroman novel. The third novel is about Meg's son, Raymond Sole, a journalist, and his relationship with his cousin Duggie Plumb, a corrupt politician. The trilogy is largely set in Henderson, in West Auckland, where Gee grew up.

== Publication history ==
Plumb was published in London by Faber and Faber in 1978, and in Auckland by Oxford University Press in 1979. Contemporary reviews were positive. David Dowling, writing in the New Zealand literary journal Landfall, called it a "fine novel, Gee's best so far", and felt it signalled "a new maturity in New Zealand fiction". In the United Kingdom, Martin Seymour-Smith, reviewing the novel for the Financial Times, noted the inspiration of Chapple, and said he suspected that much of the novel's power came "from the fact that Maurice Gee is trying to seek out the good in a man with whose fundamental precepts he is in disagreement". He praised the novel's ending as "perfect". Nina Bawden for the Daily Telegraph observed that, while "the history of the moral struggles of a Presbyterian Minister in New Zealand does not sound very enticing", it made for "unexpectedly riveting reading".

Despite selling well by the standards of New Zealand fiction, sales figures from Plumb were not enough for Gee to live off, so he branched out into children's books and television writing. He did, however, complete the sequels Meg, published in 1981, and Sole Survivor, published in 1983. Both novels were well-reviewed. David Hill, reviewing Meg, felt it was an "immensely satisfying work", speaking in "what is unmistakably a new voice". He subsequently reviewed Sole Survivor as well, highlighting the many strengths of the three novels and in particular their examination "of the fortitude, the brevity, and much of the destruction in well-meaning lives".

In addition to being published in New Zealand and the United Kingdom, Meg and Sole Survivor were also published in the United States by St Martin's Press, in 1981 and 1983 respectively. Kirkus Reviews noted the difficulty in reviewing Meg when Plumb had not been published in the United States, but said the reader would "slowly warm" to the story, especially to Meg, and that it was "far more subtle and thoughtful than most family sagas". It said of Sole Survivor that "Gee comes across as a gently unsentimental, especially economical observer of lives ... with a clear-headed realism about human motive that's steadily appealing and frequently even moving". Michael Leapman in the New York Times was less impressed, saying that to appreciate Sole Survivor a reader would have to have "a familiarity with New Zealand politics since 1950 and a taste for the sordid".

In 1995, the trilogy was published in a single volume by Penguin Books.

== Awards and legacy ==
Plumb is considered one of the best novels ever written in New Zealand. It won the 1978 James Tait Black Memorial Prize in the UK, and the top prize for fiction at both the Goodman Fielder Wattie Book Awards and the New Zealand Book Awards in 1979.

The series continues to be widely read in New Zealand. In 2006, the trilogy came second in a poll run by The Dominion Post of readers' favourite New Zealand books of the past 30 years, second only to the collected autobiography of Janet Frame. In 2018, fifty New Zealand literary experts voted Plumb to be the best New Zealand novel of the last fifty years. In response, Gee said: "I don’t think 'top' can be measured but it's good to know that Plumb is remembered and that people enjoy it. Actually, I can be more enthusiastic than that: I'm chuffed."
