= James Chapple =

Unitarian minister and pacifist

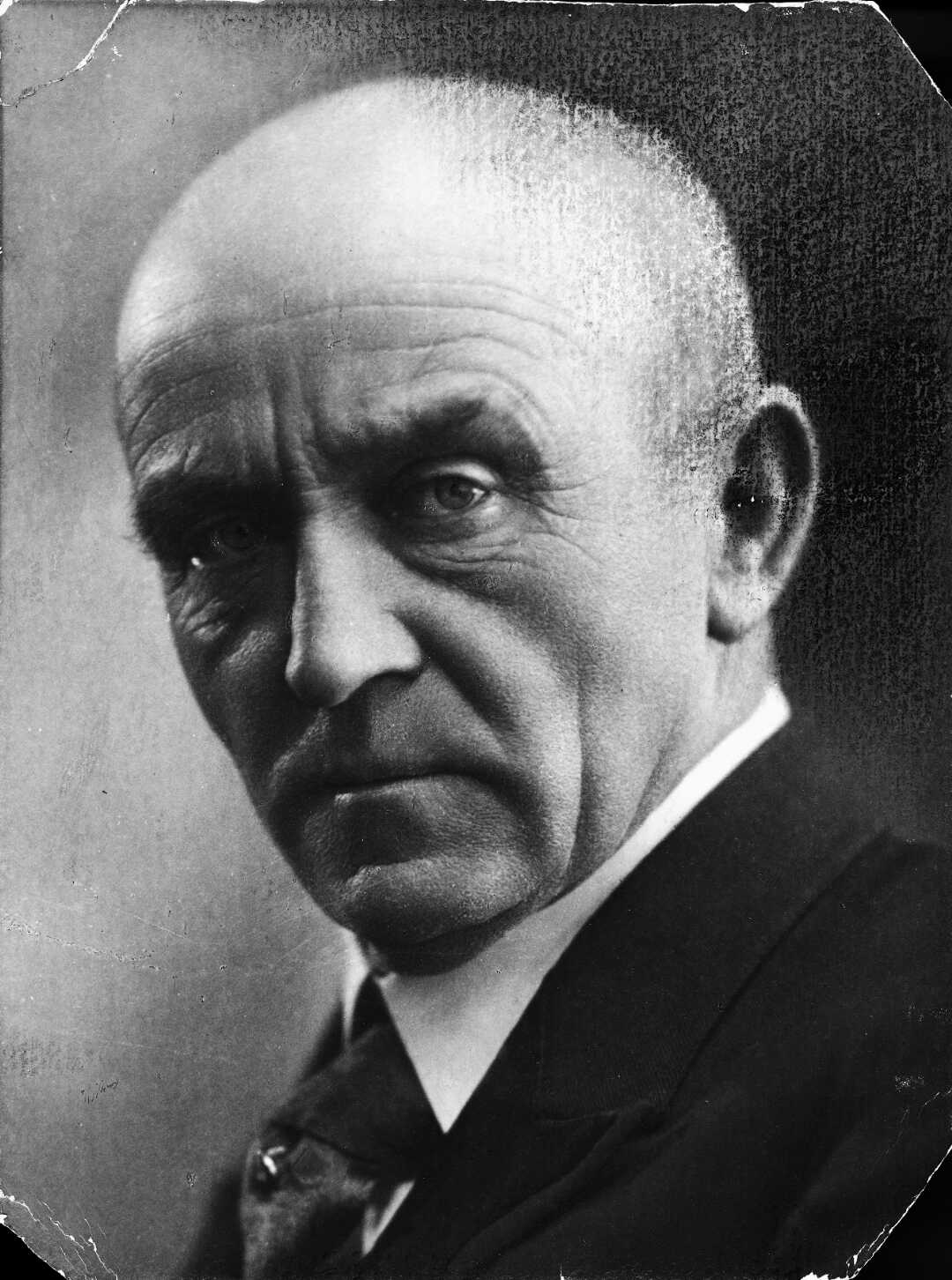
- Reverend James Chapple, unknown date
- Born: James Henry George Chapple; August 23, 1865; Rockhampton, Queensland, Australia
- Died: April 8, 1947 (aged 81); Auckland, New Zealand
- Occupation: Unitarian minister
- Spouse: Florence Gough (m. 1890)
- Children: 15

James Henry George Chapple (23 August 1865 – 8 April 1947) was a Unitarian minister, former Presbyterian minister and pacifist. He was charged with making seditious utterances in 1917 and imprisoned for 11 months, and was the inspiration for the character George Plumb in the Plumb trilogy written by his grandson Maurice Gee. He was one of only two New Zealanders nominated for the Nobel Peace Prize before 1956.

== Life and career ==
=== Early life and marriage ===
Chapple was born in Rockhampton, Queensland, Australia on 23 August 1865. He was the first child of English immigrants William Chapple, a butcher, and his wife Elizabeth. Chapple's father drowned in April 1867, and after his death, Chapple's mother gave birth to their second son who died in November of that year. Chapple was subsequently raised in England and educated at a private girls' school run by two of his aunts. His mother took him back to Australia in his late teens.

In Australia, Chapple joined the Salvation Army, becoming an officer, and in August 1890 he married another Salvation Army officer, Florence Gough. They moved to Invercargill in New Zealand in 1893 with their first two children, and thereafter served in other South Island cities.

=== Ministry ===
In 1898 Chapple and his family moved to Kumara, where he served as a Presbyterian home missionary. In 1903 he was ordained as a Presbyterian minister at St Andrews, a small town near Timaru. He joined the New Zealand Socialist Party around 1905, which resulted in him becoming increasingly unpopular with Presbyterian leadership. In 1907 the local presbytery attempted to remove him from his ministry but his parishioners voted in favour of him staying by 200 to 8.

In September 1910 the presbytery held a public hearing asking Chapple to explain his conduct in relation to a number of matters, including chairing at a lecture by English rationalist Joseph McCabe, by subscribing to the London Rationalist Association and by preaching at the Unitarian Church in Auckland. Although stating that he did not regret his actions, Chapple resigned his position at the request of the presbytery. In December of that year, the church managers wrote to the Timaru Herald with a testimonial on behalf of Mr Chapple, praising his qualities as a clergyman, and saying he had endeared himself to many for his outspokenness and by refusing to be silenced. The Herald recorded that Chapple and his wife were presented with one hundred sovereigns on behalf of "friends and sympathisers". From October 1910 to March 1913 he worked as the librarian of the local library.

In 1911, Chapple founded the Timaru Unitarian Society where he lectured as minister. When Unitarian minister William Jellie visited in July 1911 he found "a thoroughly live movement, an increasing congregation, a Sunday School with 50 on its roll, and a Discussion Society that meets during the week". In 1912 a permanent church was built by Chapple's supporters.

=== Opposition to World War I ===
Chapple was a staunch pacifist and opposed World War I. In August 1914 he wrote to the Timaru Herald requesting that German scientists' work be reported on in the paper, but acknowledging the difficulties presented by the "present state of the public mind, when most and sundry (parsons included) are talking blood, thinking blood, reading blood, dreaming blood and thirsting for blood, in fact for the time being relapsed into the Dark Ages". In November of that year, he wrote an article opposing patriotism for the left-wing newspaper Maoriland Worker. In June 1915, he was forced by local opposition, and the intervention of then Prime Minister Bill Massey and the police, to cancel an intended anti-war sermon on "New Zealand as a Peace-Loving Republic". In response, Chapple noted that "the man who first raised his voice against slavery was a dangerous man", and warned that "this war is but a prelude to other wars".

In July 1915 Chapple moved to California with his wife and thirteen of his fourteen surviving children, in the expectation that the United States would remain neutral. He wrote that he wished to escape the "vortex of racial ill-will and jingoism" that New Zealand had become. His eldest son, Leonard, had enlisted against his wishes. In October of that year he wrote to the Maoriland Worker saying that the family would not return to New Zealand until "democracy crushes militarism". During his time in the United States he gave lectures on the subject of New Zealand and militarism. When it became clear that the United States would enter the war the family returned to New Zealand and settled in Christchurch, where Chapple founded a Unitarian church. In his initial service on 11 February 1917, he spoke on the subject of "My Journey from Orthodoxy to a Rational Religion", and the importance of focussing one's attention on the interests and service of man as opposed to "an imaginary future hell".

Following Chapple's continued preaching against the war, in 1917 the police charged him with two counts of seditious utterance at Greymouth. The charge stated that Chapple had said on 29 March:

You are under the heels of the War Lords ... I tell my children when they come home not to sing the national anthem. I am hoping this, with a fervent hope, that in this war there will be no victor. To pray about a war is blasphemy. A woman goes down the valley of death to bring a child into the world, she nurses it, sends it to school, sees it through the sixth standard, then comes the call to arms, and it goes away to war; what for? To die for its country? No, to die for the profiteer.

Chapple did not deny having said these words, but his defence was that they were said with qualifications or elaborations that would disprove the charge. He was however convicted on both counts and sentenced to 11 months in prison, with the magistrate describing him as "a dangerous man to be at large". His family were supported by socialist friends and sympathisers during his imprisonment, including Fred Cooke, Ada Wells, Tim Armstrong and Ted Howard.

=== Later life and legacy ===
On Chapple's release in February 1919 he continued preaching as a Unitarian minister in Christchurch until 1925, despite his socialist beliefs being opposed by many within the Unitarian movement. He wrote two books which were published in England in 1924: The Divine Need of the Rebel and A Rebel's Vision Splendid.

In 1925, Chapple and his family moved to Tauranga, then to Henderson in West Auckland. He was a frequent speaker at meetings of the Rationalist Association. In 1930 he was nominated for a Nobel Peace Prize by Raglan politician Lee Martin. He continued to work as a Unitarian minister until 1941, when he voluntarily resigned; he had supported the Soviet Union in its non-aggression pact with Germany, which was opposed by many in the church, and when Germany invaded the Soviet Union his position became untenable. He died in 1947, survived by his wife and fourteen of his children.

Chapple's grandson Maurice Gee was a well-known New Zealand author, whose novel Plumb (1978) is considered one of the best novels ever written in New Zealand. The main character and narrator George Plumb is based on the life of Chapple. The two sequels Meg (1981) and Sole Survivor (1983) follow the lives of Plumb's daughter (based on Gee's mother) and grandchildren.

Another grandson, Geoff Chapple, is also a writer and journalist, and wrote Chapple's entry in the Dictionary of New Zealand Biography. He is himself a political activist having been involved in protests against the 1981 Springbok rugby tour in New Zealand and the anti-nuclear movement.
