= Olu Jacobs =

Nigerian actor (1942–2026)

Olu Jacobs MFR
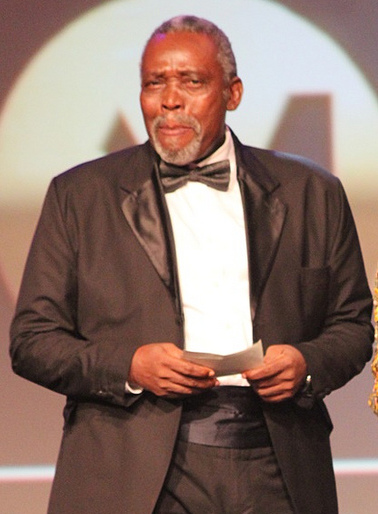
- Jacobs at the Africa Movie Academy Awards in 2014
- Born: Oludotun Baiyewu Jacobs; 11 July 1942; Abeokuta, Colony and Protectorate of Nigeria
- Died: 16 September 2026 (aged 84)
- Education: Royal Academy of Dramatic Arts
- Occupation: Actor
- Years active: 1970–2026
- Spouse: Joke Silva (m. 1989)

Oludotun Baiyewu Jacobs, MFR (11 July 1942 – 16 September 2026), known professionally as Olu Jacobs, was a Nigerian actor and film executive. He began his career starring in several British television series and international films. Vanguard described him as one of the "godfathers of Nollywood" Trained at The Royal Academy of Dramatic Arts, England, Olu Jacobs worked with various repertoire theatres in Britain and starred in some international movies.

In 2007, Jacobs won the Africa Movie Academy Award for Best Actor in a Leading Role. He received the Industry Merit Award for outstanding achievements in acting at the 2013 Africa Magic Viewers' Choice Awards and the MAA Lifetime Achievement Award in 2016. He was conferred the national honour of Member of the Order of the Federal Republic in 2011.

== Early life ==
Oludotun Baiyewu Jacobs was born to parents from Egba Alake. He spent his early childhood in Kano and attended Holy Trinity School where he was a member of the debating and drama societies. He was inspired to take a chance with acting when he attended one of Chief Hubert Ogunde's annual concert parties at Colonial Hotel in Kano. Afterwards, he secured a visa and travelled to England to study acting.

In England, Jacobs trained at The Royal Academy of Dramatic Arts in London.

== Career ==
One of his earliest stage roles was to play the part of The Boy in 'A Taste of Honey' at the newly opened Crucible Theatre in Sheffield, in 1972. He then appeared in various British television shows and series in the 1970s (including The Goodies, Till Death Us Do Part, Barlow at Large, The Venturers, Angels, 1990, The Tomorrow People and The Professionals). In 1978, he played the role of President Mageeba in Michael Codron's presentation of Sir Tom Stoppard's play Night and Day.

In the 1980s, Jacobs appeared in several international films, including John Irvin's war film The Dogs of War, Roman Polanski's adventure-comedy Pirates (1986) and the family-adventure film Baby: Secret of the Lost Legend (1985). On television, he was a cast member in TVS's The Witches and the Grinnygog. In 1990, upon his return to Nigeria, he starred in the NTA detective series The Third Eye.

Jacobs subsequently starred in over 120 Nollywood films and is considered one of the top Nigerian Nollywood actors. He also appeared in television commercials for food company Ribena and electronic giant, Binatone.

== Personal life and death ==
Jacobs was married to fellow Nollywood actor Joke Silva since 1989. They had two children. Asked why his wife still bears her maiden name, Jacobs answered: "She is her own individual. When I met her, she was an actress known as Joke Silva; so why should marrying me now deny her and her audience her name. She is Miss Joke Silva who is also Mrs. Joke Jacobs. It is as simple as that. People began to say what they like. They have even written that we are separated and all sorts of stuff. When she is working, she is Joke Silva and as well as Mrs. Joke Jacobs at home." The couple founded and operated the Lufodo Group, a media corporation that consists of film production, distribution assets and the Lufodo Academy of Performing Arts.

Rumours that Jacobs had died circulated in 2021, until he attended Afriff in November 2021 where he was honoured with the Lifetime Achievement Award. His wife Silva later revealed in an interview with Chude Jideonwo that he was battling Lewy body dementia.

Olu Jacobs died on 16 September 2026, at the age of 84, with an announcement made by his son in the early hours of the day.

== Accolades ==
In 2011, Nigerian president Goodluck Jonathan awarded Jacobs the national honour of a Member of the Order of the Federal Republic for his long service in the film industry. He received the accolade in a ceremony that year.

Olu Jacobs was honoured with the Industry Merit Award for outstanding achievements in acting at the 2013 Africa Magic Viewers' Choice Awards.

In August 2022, he was presented an icon award and a membership certificate along with his wife by Audio-Visual Rights Society of Nigeria (AVRS).

== Stage (selected) ==
Year	Show	Role	Notes
1971	Murderous Angels: A Political Tragedy and Comedy in Black and White (play)		Written by Conor Cruise O'Brien and performed at the Dublin Theatre Festival in 1971
1972	Richard's Cork Leg		Royal Court Theatre, London
1974	Black Mans Country	Father Zachary Azuka	Gate Theatre
1977	Julius Caesar	One of the augerers	Royal National Theatre 1977 presentation directed by John Schlesinger
1976	Bar Beach Prelude and Transistor Radio		Two shorts play adapted from the works of Bode Sowande and Ken Saro Wiwa
1976	A Kind of Marriage	Obi	Centre Play
1977	Old Movies	Chris Hunter (gendarmes)	National Theatre presentation
1978	Night and Day	President Mageeba	Phoenix Theatre (London)

== Filmography ==
=== Film ===
Year	Film	Role	Notes
1979	Ashanti	Commissioner Batak	
1980	The Dogs of War	Customs Officer	
1985	Baby: Secret of the Lost Legend	Col. Nsogbu	
1986	Pirates	Boomako	
2007	Greatness	King	
2008	Smoke & Mirrors	Alhaji Sanni	
2009	League of Gentlemen	Chief Kolade	
2010	Bent Arrows	Mr. Johnson	
2011	Sacred Lies	Theodore	
2011	White Chapel	chief Tonye	
2012	Adesuwa	Ezomo	
2013	Potomanto	Bankole	
2014	The Antique	Oba Ekpen	
2014	Bloody Ring	Osuma	
2015	Oloibiri	Timipre	
2015	Dry	Speaker	
2015	One Fine Day		
2017	The Royal Hibiscus Hotel	Richard	
2017	Victims	Baba Deolu	
2017	Unveil		

=== Television ===
Year	Programme	Role	Notes
1971	The Goodies		Season 2, Episode 4 – "Lost Tribe of the Orinoco"
1974	Till Death Us Do Part	Television repair man	Season 5, Episode 3 – "Strikes and Blackouts"
1975	Barlow at Large	Motamba	Season 4, Episode 8 – "Protection"
1975	The Venturers	Mbela	Season 1, Episode 10 – "Dangerous and the Lonely Hearts"
1976	Angels	Musa Ladipo	3 episodes
1978	1990	Alan Msawi	Season 2, Episode 2 – "The Market Price"
1975	The Tomorrow People	General Papa Minn	Season 6, Episode 5 & 6 – "The Thargon Menace: Part 1 & 2"
1979	The Professionals	Sylvester	Season 3, Episode 5 – "The Madness of Mickey Hamilton"
1982	Squadron	President Gadin	Season 1, Episode 10 – "Cyclone"
1983	The Witches and the Grinnygog	Mr Alabaster	Episodes 1–4, 6
1983	Rumpole of the Bailey	David Mazenze	Season 3, Episode 2 – "Rumpole and the Golden Thread"
1984	Play for Today	David Mazenze	Season 14, Episode 16 – "The Amazing Miss Stella Estelle"
1990	The Third Eye	Inspector Best Idafa	Lead role (1990–1993)
