= Dorothy Edwards (children's writer) =

British children's writer

- Born: Dorothy Violet Ellen Brown; 6 November 1914; Teddington, Middlesex
- Died: 9 August 1982 (aged 67); Surrey, England
- Citizenship: British
- Spouse: Francis P. Edwards (1908–84)
- Children: 2
- Writing career
- Years active: 1952–1982
- Genre: Children's books
- Notable works: My Naughty Little Sister; The Witches and the Grinnygog

Dorothy Violet Ellen Edwards (née Brown; 6 November 1914 – 8 August 1982) was a children's writer from England best known for her My Naughty Little Sister book series and novel The Witches and the Grinnygog (1981).

== Background ==
She was born into a working-class family in Teddington, Richmond Upon Thames. Her mother's maiden name was Saunders.

Her father taught her to read at an early age, enabling her to write her first story at four years of age. Her stories, poems and articles were published throughout her twenties, and at this time she married her husband Francis P. "Frank" Edwards in 1942, and had two children, Jane and Frank. She died in 1982 and was buried alongside her younger sister Phyllis Mary F. Brown, known as "Pip", (1920–1977), to whom her Naughty Little Sister books were dedicated. She was survived by her husband, who died two years later.

== Works ==
=== Publications ===
Edwards' most famous stories are of My Naughty Little Sister, which she conceived to keep her daughter, Jane, quiet whilst on a family holiday in 1950. She wrote five books of these stories, which were illustrated by Shirley Hughes. She wrote several other children's story books and picture books.

She also edited several anthologies of short stories, folklore and poetry for children, chiefly on the subjects of magic, witchcraft and ghosts. Two of these are Ghosts and Shadows 1980 and Mists and Magic 1983.

=== Radio ===
Edwards helped to devise the radio show Listen with Mother on which her Naughty Little Sister books were broadcast from 1950, and she also wrote for Playschool and Jackanory.

== Awards ==
She was shortlisted for the Whitbread Award for children's literature for The Witches and the Grinnygog 1981, a novel for children about the survival of benign pagan witchcraft in modern Britain. This novel was later adapted for television.

== Selected books ==
=== My Naughty Little Sister ===
- My Naughty Little Sister (1952)
- My Naughty Little Sister's Friends (1962)
- When My Naughty Little Sister Was Good (1968)
- All About My Naughty Little Sister (1969)
- More Naughty Little Sister Stories (1971)
- My Naughty Little Sister & Bad Harry (1974)

=== Others ===
- Tales of Joe and Timothy (1969)
- Joe and Timothy Together (1971)
- The Magician Who Kept a Pub and Other Stories (1975)
- A Strong and Willing Girl (1980)
- The Witches and the Grinnygog (1981)
- The Old Man Who Sneezed (1983)
- Mark the Drummer-Boy (1983)

== Bibliography ==
- Ed. Jack Zipes, The Oxford Encyclopedia of Children's Literature (2006), Oxford University Press. "Edwards, Dorothy" ISBN 9780195307429
