= Maurice Gee =

New Zealand novelist (1931–2025)

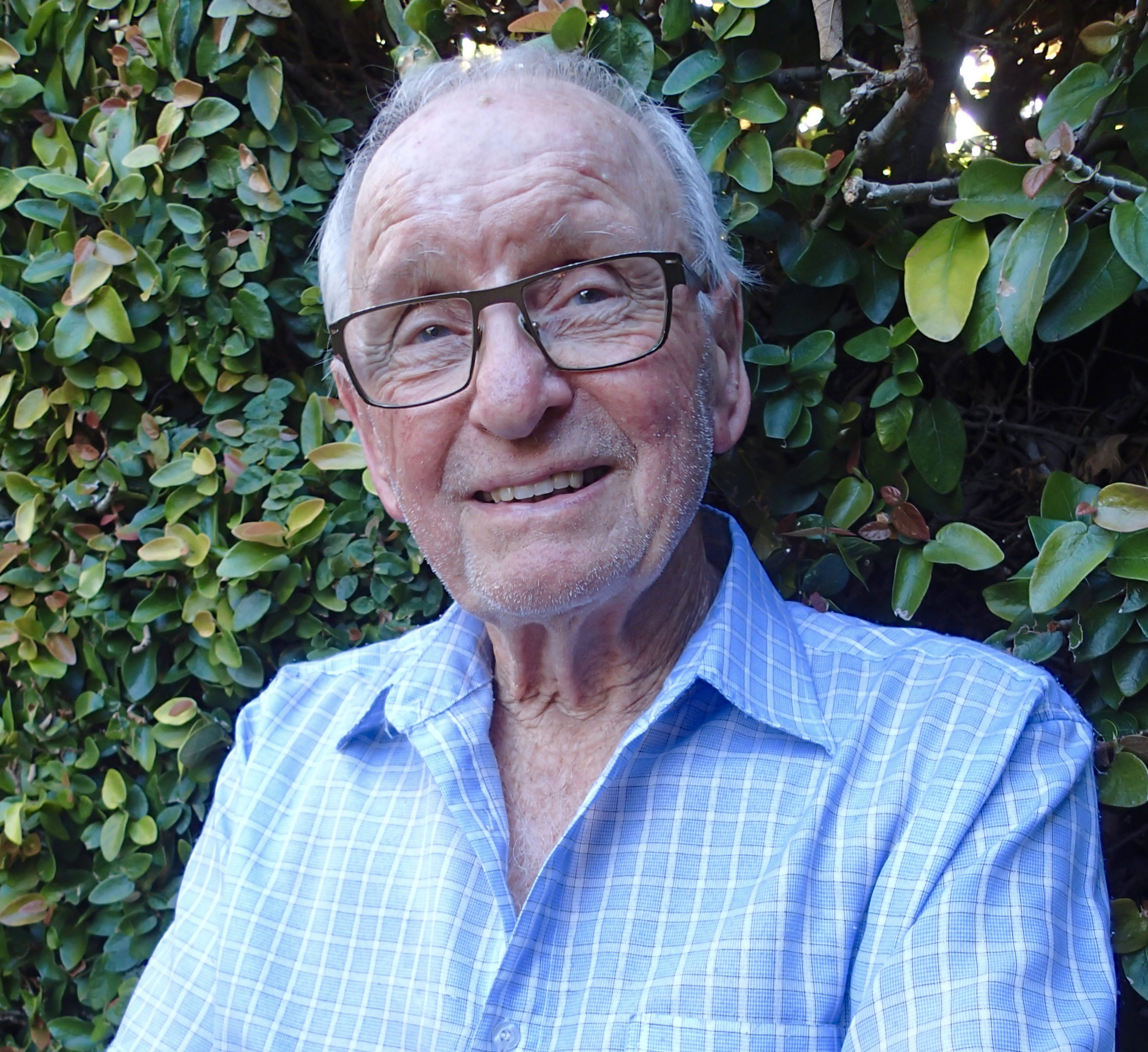
- Gee in 2018
- Born: Maurice Gough Gee; 22 August 1931; Whakatāne, New Zealand
- Died: 12 June 2025 (aged 93); Nelson, New Zealand
- Education: University of Auckland
- Occupation: Writer
- Spouse: Margareta Gee (m. 1970)
- Children: 3
- Writing career
- Notable works: In My Father's Den (1972); Plumb (1978); Under the Mountain (1979)

Maurice Gough Gee (22 August 1931 – 12 June 2025) was a New Zealand novelist. He was one of New Zealand's most distinguished and prolific authors, having written over thirty novels for adults and children, and having won numerous awards both in New Zealand and overseas, including multiple top prizes at the New Zealand Book Awards, the James Tait Black Memorial Prize in the UK, the Katherine Mansfield Menton Fellowship, the Robert Burns Fellowship and a Prime Minister's Award for Literary Achievement. In 2003, he was recognised as one of New Zealand's greatest living artists across all disciplines by the Arts Foundation of New Zealand, which presented him with an Icon Award.

Gee's novel Plumb (1978) was described by the Oxford Companion to New Zealand Literature to be one of the best novels ever written in New Zealand. He was also well-known for children's and young adult fiction such as Under the Mountain (1979). He won multiple top prizes at the New Zealand Book Awards for Children and Young Adults and in 2002 he was presented with the prestigious Margaret Mahy Award by the Children's Literature Foundation in recognition of his contributions to children's literature.

== Early life and education ==
Gee was born in Whakatāne, and brought up in Henderson, a suburb of Auckland, a location that frequently features in his writing. His mother, Harriet Lyndahl Gee (née Chapple), was a socialist and an aspiring writer who had some of her work published, including a children's picture book called Mihi and the Last of the Moas (1943), and his father, Leonard Gee, was a carpenter. He was the middle child of their three sons. Gee was also the grandson of controversial Presbyterian-turned-Unitarian minister James Chapple, later to be the inspiration for Gee's character George Plumb in his Plumb trilogy (1978).

Gee attended Henderson Primary School and Avondale College, and completed BA and MA degrees at the University of Auckland, which subsequently recognised him with a Distinguished Alumni Award in 1998, and an honorary Doctorate of Literature in 2004. He also received an honorary Doctorate of Literature from Victoria University of Wellington in 1987.

== Literary career ==
=== Early career: 1950 to 1977 ===
Gee began writing at university, and had short stories published in New Zealand journals Landfall and Mate. After finishing his MA he taught in the secondary department of Paeroa District High School for about 18 months, starting in February 1955, but resigned in July 1956 to focus on his writing. In January 1960 and December 1961, he was awarded literary grants by the New Zealand Literary Fund.

His first published novel was The Big Season (1962), a novel about a rugby player who becomes interested in a burglar and the burglar's girlfriend. It had themes of violence and tension, and was described by The New Zealand Herald as "not always pleasant, but certainly forceful and sincere". Gee himself was a keen rugby player and the games in the novel were inspired by his own experiences. In 1964, Gee was the sixth recipient of the Robert Burns Fellowship at the University of Otago, one of New Zealand's most prestigious literary awards. During this fellowship he wrote his second novel, A Special Flower (1965). After the fellowship he trained as a librarian and in the 1960s and 1970s worked at the Alexander Turnbull Library, the Napier library and several libraries in Auckland.

His third novel, In My Father's Den, a mystery novel, was published in 1972. This novel was later adapted into the critically acclaimed film of the same name by director Brad McGann in 2004. Gee followed this novel with a collection of short stories, A Glorious Morning, Comrade (1974), which won the prize for fiction at the 1976 New Zealand Book Awards, and a further novel Games of Choice (1976).

=== Plumb and children's fiction: 1978 to 1991 ===
Gee's novel Plumb, published in 1978, is his best-known work for adults, and is considered one of the best novels ever written in New Zealand. In 2018, fifty New Zealand literary experts voted it to be the best novel of the last fifty years. Gee described it as his "grandfather novel", with the character George Plumb closely based on his mother's father James Chapple, particularly his early life and his trials for heresy and seditious utterance. It won the James Tait Black Memorial Prize in the UK, and the top prize for fiction at both the Goodman Fielder Wattie Book Awards and the New Zealand Book Awards in 1979. The novel and its two sequels, Meg (1981) and Sole Survivor (1983), explore the impacts of history, politics and religion on one family from the perspectives of different members. Meg won the top prize for fiction at the New Zealand Book Awards in 1982.

At this time Gee also published his first children's novel, Under the Mountain (1979), a science fiction story set in Auckland, New Zealand, about 11-year-old twins who discover aliens under volcanic Lake Pupuke. It has remained in print since it was published and is considered a New Zealand classic. It has been adapted into a 1981 television miniseries, a 2009 film and a stage show. In 2004, Under the Mountain was the recipient of the Gaelyn Gordon Award, awarded annually to a "much-loved" New Zealand children's book that did not win any awards at the time of its publication. It was followed by other children's books, including notably the science fiction trilogy beginning with The Halfmen of O (1982), which won the AIM Children's Book Awards Book of the Year Award in 1983, and Motherstone (1985), which was awarded the Esther Glen Award by LIANZA.

In order to improve his income, Gee began working in television writing, including writing for 11 episodes of soap opera Close to Home and episodes of police drama Mortimer's Patch. Two of his children's books, The Fire-Raiser (1986) and The Champion (1989) originated as television projects. The Champion was shortlisted for the 1990 Esther Glen Award. In 1987, he was recognised by Victoria University of Wellington with the award of an honorary Doctorate of Literature, and in 1989 he held a Victoria University writing fellowship. Around this time he wrote two adult novels set in Nelson: Prowlers (1987) and The Burning Boy (1990). The Burning Boy was awarded the top prize for fiction at the 1991 New Zealand Book Awards.

=== Later career and legacy: 1992 to 2025 ===
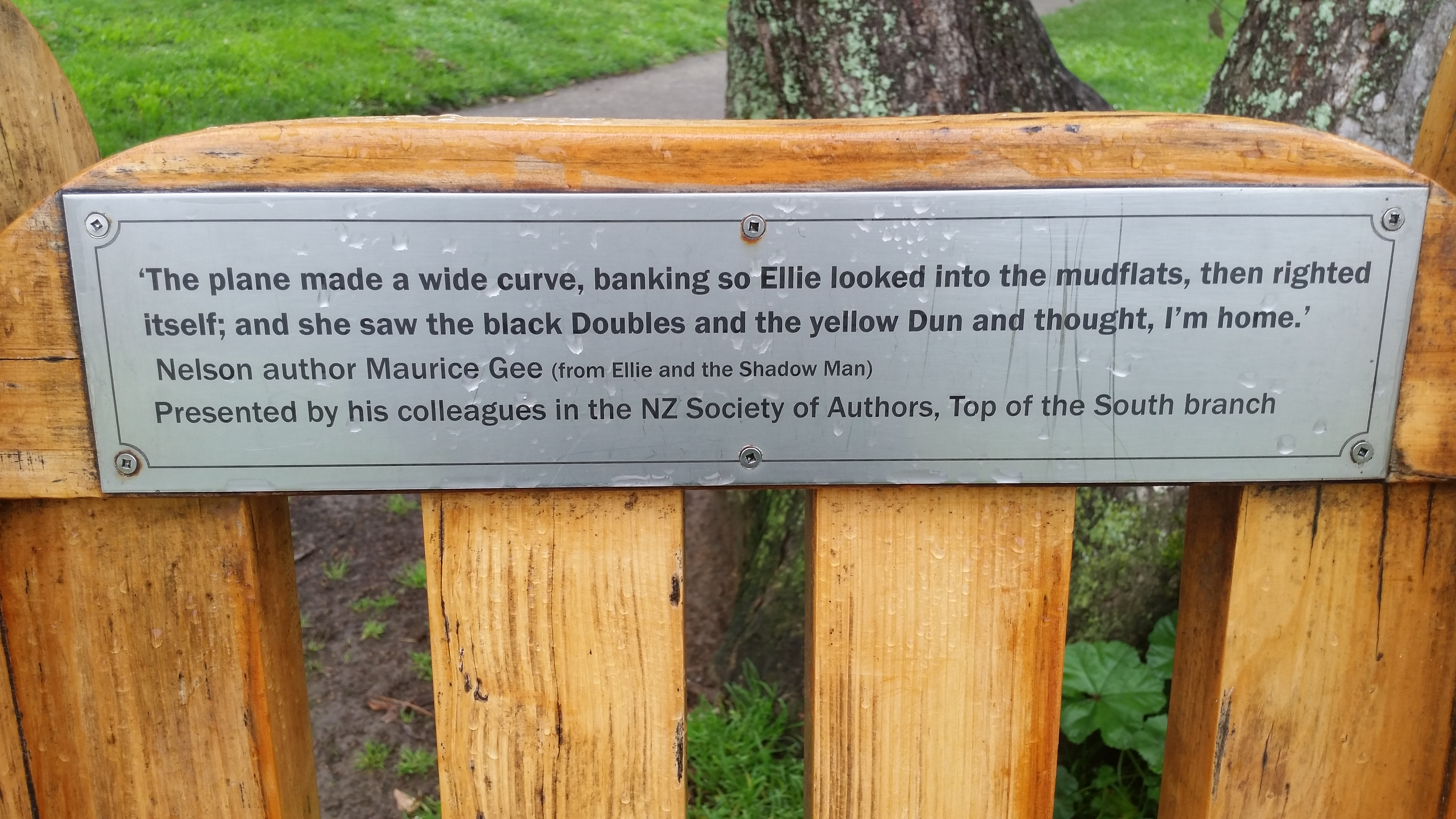
Plaque on chair installed by the Maitai River in 2011 by the New Zealand Society of Authors in honour of Gee

The publication of Gee's tenth novel, Going West (1992), cemented his reputation as one of the best writers in New Zealand. It is the most autobiographical of Gee's fictional novels, and the fictional town of Loomis, in which the novel is set, has many similarities to Henderson, Auckland, where Gee grew up. The novel was the inspiration for the Going West Books & Writers Festival, Auckland's first literary festival, which has been held since 1996. It won the top prize for fiction at the 1993 Goodman Fielder Wattie Book Awards. In 1993, Andro Linklater, writing in British newspaper The Sunday Times, said that "Gee deserves to be regarded as one of the finest writers at work, not only in New Zealand ... but in the English speaking world".

Gee was the 1992 recipient of the Katherine Mansfield Menton Fellowship, a literary fellowship that enables the recipient to work in Menton, France, for part of the year, where Katherine Mansfield herself lived and worked in the early 20th century. During his time in Menton, Gee wrote the novel Crime Story, which was published in 1994. A decade later it was adapted by Larry Parr into the 2004 film Fracture. The film was praised by Christchurch newspaper The Press as "competent, confident and complex".

The Fat Man (1994) won the AIM Children's Book of the Year award and the Esther Glen Award. It was controversial for its content and portrayal of violence, with Gee himself describing it as a "psychological thriller for children". In 1998, he published Live Bodies, a novel for adults that was awarded both the top prize for fiction and the Deutz Medal at the Montana New Zealand Book Awards that year. Other notable works in the late 1990s included the children's books Orchard Street (1998) and Hostel Girl (1999). His contributions to New Zealand children's literature were recognised by the Children's Literature Foundation in 2002 which presented him with the prestigious Margaret Mahy Award.

In the early 2000s, Gee's novels included Ellie and the Shadow Man (2001), which was short-listed for the Montana New Zealand Book Awards in 2002, and The Scornful Moon (2003), which was short-listed for Best Book in the South Pacific & South East Asian Region of the 2004 Commonwealth Writers' Prize and a runner-up in the fiction category at the 2004 Montana New Zealand Book Awards. Gee also received two prestigious awards: in 2003 he was named as one of New Zealand's greatest living artists by the Arts Foundation of New Zealand through the presentation of an Icon Award (recipients being limited to a living circle of 20), and in 2004 he received a NZ$60,000 Prime Minister's Award for Literary Achievement for fiction. His 2005 novel Blindsight won the Deutz Medal, the top prize for fiction and (jointly) the Readers' Choice Award at the 2006 Montana New Zealand Book Awards. His 2007 novel Salt won the award for young adult fiction at the New Zealand Post Children's Book Awards. Salt and its sequel, Gool, were both listed as Storylines Notable Young Adult Fiction Books. The third novel in the trilogy, The Limping Man (2010), was a finalist in the young adult fiction category at the New Zealand Book Awards for Children and Young Adults. In 2012, he was the inaugural Honoured New Zealand Writer at the Auckland Writers & Readers Festival.

In 2015, Rachel Barrowman's biography of Gee, Maurice Gee: Life and Work, was published by Victoria University Press. The book was critically well-received, and Gee said Barrowman's research was "thorough, unrelenting, illuminating — illuminating even for me". Although Gee said in 2012 that he did not expect to write another novel, The Severed Land was published in 2017 and received the top award for young adult fiction at the New Zealand Book Awards for Children and Young Adults in that same year.

In 2018, Gee published his memoir Memory Pieces. The memoir is in three parts: the first about his parents' lives, the second about his own childhood and adolescent years, and the third about his wife. He said it was "almost certainly" going to be his last book. It was shortlisted for the Royal Society Te Apārangi Award for General Non-Fiction at the 2019 Ockham New Zealand Book Awards.

== Style and themes ==
Gee's novels are commonly set in New Zealand, often in fictitious versions of Henderson, where he grew up. His adult novels tend to be realistic portrayals of New Zealand life, often featuring dysfunctional families and relationships, while his children's and young adult novels tend to be fantasies or science fiction. Even in his children's novels, his writing often features bleak or tragic moments. The Oxford Companion to New Zealand Literature (2006) said that each of Gee's novels "bountifully gives us a rich vision of some region and aspect of New Zealand life, and of human life in general ... Yet there is always an awareness of living at the edge of an abyss: one false move and we shall leave this abundance for nothingness."

== Personal life ==
Gee had a seven-year relationship with Hera Smith, with whom he had a son, Nigel, in September 1959. They separated in the 1960s.

Gee married his wife Margareta in 1970, having met in 1966 at the Alexander Turnbull Library where she worked. They had two daughters, Abigail and Emily. Abigail works as an animator, and Emily is a writer who has published fantasy and historical novels. Gee said in 2018 that meeting Margareta changed his life: "I was 38 when we got together and was drifting and wasting my time and only pretending to be a writer. She brought stability of every kind into my life – and as I point out in Running on the Stairs, two novels and a handful of stories before meeting her, more than 30 novels since."

As of 2020, he lived in Nelson with his wife and considered himself to be retired from writing. Gee considered himself an evolutionary humanist. He was an Honorary Associate of the New Zealand Association of Rationalists and Humanists.

Gee died in Nelson on 12 June 2025, at the age of 93. He supported end of life choice.

== Awards and honours ==
- 1960: Literary grant from the New Zealand Literary Fund
- 1961: Scholarship in Letters from the New Zealand Literary Fund
- 1964: Robert Burns Fellowship at the University of Otago
- 1978: James Tait Black Memorial Prize for Plumb (1978)
- 1979: 1st Prize for Fiction at the Goodman Fielder Wattie Book Awards for Plumb (1978)
- 1979: Fiction Prize at the New Zealand Book Awards for Plumb (1978)
- 1983: AIM Children's Book Awards Book of the Year for The Halfmen of O (1982)
- 1986: Esther Glen Award for Motherstone (1985)
- 1987: Honorary Doctorate of Literature from Victoria University of Wellington
- 1989: Victoria University of Wellington Writing Fellowship
- 1992: Katherine Mansfield Menton Fellowship
- 1993: 1st Prize for Fiction at the Goodman Fielder Wattie Book Awards for Going West (1993)
- 1995: Esther Glen Award for The Fat Man (1995)
- 1995: AIM Children's Book Awards Book of the Year for The Fat Man (1995)
- 1998: Deutz Medal for fiction at the Montana New Zealand Book Awards for Live Bodies (1998)
- 2002: Margaret Mahy Award for significant contributions to children's literature
- 2003: Named an Arts Foundation Icon in 2003
- 2004: Gaelyn Gordon Award for Under the Mountain
- 2004: $60,000 Prime Minister's Award for Literary Achievement for fiction
- 2004: Honorary Doctorate of Literature from the University of Auckland
- 2006: Deutz Medal for Fiction at the Montana New Zealand Book Awards for Blindsight (2005)
- 2008: New Zealand Post Young Adult Fiction Award for Salt (2007)
- 2017: New Zealand Book Awards for Children and Young Adults Copyright Licensing NZ Award for Young Adult Fiction for The Severed Land (2017)

== Adaptations ==
Feature films

- Fracture (2004) based on Crime Story
- In My Father's Den (2004)
- Under the Mountain (2009)

Television

- Under the Mountain (1981) eight-part miniseries
- The Fire-Raiser (1986), five part series

Theatre

- Under the Mountain theatrical play by Auckland Theatre Company. Playwright Pip Hall, directed by Sara Brodie (2018)

== Bibliography ==
=== Novels and non-fiction ===
- The Big Season. London: Hutchinson, 1962. London: Arrow, 1964. Wellington: Allen & Unwin, 1985.
- A Special Flower. London: Hutchinson, 1965.
- In My Father's Den. London: Faber, 1972. Auckland: Oxford UP, 1978. ISBN 0571098509
- A Glorious Morning, Comrade. Auckland: Auckland UP and Oxford UP, 1975.
- Games of Choice. London: Faber, 1976. Auckland: Oxford UP, 1978.
- Plumb. London: Faber, 1978. Auckland: Oxford UP, 1979 (Part 1 of the Plumb trilogy).
- Under the Mountain. Wellington: Oxford UP, 1979.
- The World Around the Corner. Wellington: Oxford UP, 1980.
- Meg. London: Faber, 1981. New York: St. Martin's Press, 1982. Auckland: Penguin (Part 2 of the Plumb trilogy).
- The Halfmen of O. Auckland: Oxford UP, 1982. Harmondsworth: Puffin, 1986.
- Sole Survivor. London: Faber, 1983. New York: St. Martin's Press, 1983. Auckland: Penguin, 1983 (Part 3 of the Plumb trilogy).
- The Priests of Ferris. Auckland: Oxford UP, 1984.
- Motherstone. Auckland: Oxford UP, 1985.
- The Fire-Raiser. Auckland: Puffin, 1986.
- Collected Stories. Auckland: Penguin, 1986. New York: Penguin, 1987.
- Prowlers. London and Boston: Faber, 1987.
- The Champion. Auckland: Puffin, 1989; New York: Simon & Schuster, 1993.
- The Burning Boy. London: Faber, 1990, 1992; Auckland: Viking, 1990.
- Going West. Auckland: Viking, 1992; London: Faber, 1992; Auckland: Penguin, 2000.
- Crime Story.Auckland: Penguin Books, 1994; Auckland: Viking, 1994; London: Faber, 1995.
- The Fat Man. Auckland: Viking, 1994; Auckland: Puffin, 2000; Auckland: Puffin, 2008.
- Plumb Trilogy. Auckland: Penguin, 1995 (Plumb, Meg, & Sole Survivor).
- Loving Ways. Auckland: Penguin, 1996.
- Live Bodies. Auckland: Penguin, 1998; London: Faber, 1998; Scheuring: Black Ink, 2002 (German edition).
- Orchard Street. Auckland: Viking, 1998.
- Hostel Girl. Auckland: Puffin, 1999.
- Ellie and the Shadow Man. Auckland: Penguin, 2001.
- The Scornful Moon. Auckland: Penguin, 2003.
- Blindsight. Auckland: Penguin, 2005.
- Salt. Auckland: Puffin, 2007.
- Gool. Auckland: Puffin, 2008.
- Access Road. Auckland: Penguin, 2009.
- The Limping Man. Auckland: Puffin, 2010.
- The Severed Land. Auckland: Penguin Random House, 2017.
- Memory Pieces. Wellington: Victoria University Press, 2018.

=== Short stories: first publication ===
- "In at the Death", Kiwi (1955): 21–26.
- "The Widow", Landfall 9 (1955): 196–213. In GMC, CS.
- "Evening at Home", Arena 45 (1956): 23–24.
- "The Quarry", Arena 46 (1957): 6–10, 13.
- "A Sleeping Face", Landfall 11 (1957): 194–221. In GMC, CS.
- "A Girl in Blue", Mate 2 (1958): 10–19.
- "While the Flag was Up", Arena 50 (1958–59): 13–17, 28.
- "The Losers", Landfall 13 (1959): 120–47. In Landfall Country: Work from Landfall, 1947–1961. Christchurch: Caxton Press, 1962, 24–56. In New Zealand Short Stories, Second Series. Ed. C. K. Stead. London: Oxford UP, 1966, 255–95. In GMC, CS.
- "Facade", Mate 4 (1960): 26–33.
- "Schooldays", Mate December 1960: 2–11. In GMC, CS.
- "The Champion", Landfall 20 (1966): 113–25. In GMC, CS.
- "Down in the World", Landfall 21 (1967): 296–302. In GMC, CS.
- "A Retired Life", Landfall 23 (1969): 101–16. In GMC, CS.

== See also ==
- New Zealand literature
