= Kaylah Oniwo =

Nigerian media entrepreneur

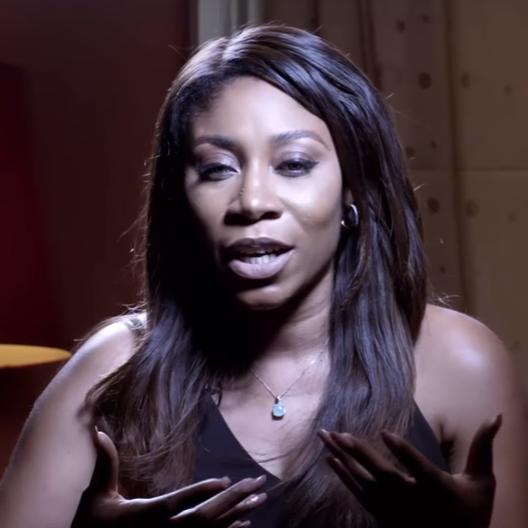

Kaylah Oniwo is a Nigerian radio personality, actress, fashionista, blogger and presenter. She is known for co-hosting 'The Road Show' and 'CATWALK WITH KAYLAH' on Cool FM Nigeria.

== Education and early life ==
Kaylah was born in Nigeria on 22 January. Her father was a navy commander while her mother was a fashion designer. She has a degree in Banking and Finance from Bowen University. She has a certificate from Lufodo Academy of Performing Arts (LAPA) in Acting for Film, Stage, Dance and Drama.

== Career ==
Kaylah Oniwo worked as a marketer for a digital company, and later in 2005 worked as a marketer for a clothing store. She hosted 'Campus Square', 'Youth Scene' and some other shows for Radio Unity Nigeria FM.

She joined Cool FM in 2010. At Cool FM she co-hosts 'The Road Show', which runs from 3pm to 7pm. She also hosts her own show, 'CATWALK WITH KAYLAH', which talks mainly about fashion. Some of the shows Kaylah has hosted include:

- Future Awards Leadership Summit.
- Aviators Magazine red carpet.
- Copa Lagos Fashion Show.

Kaylah is a brand ambassador for the beauty brand Makari. She was featured alongside six other women in 'The power of 7' campaign by jewellery brand Bland2Glam.

== Awards ==
| Year | Award | Category | Result |
|---|---|---|---|
| 2012 | ELOY Awards | Best Female on-Air Personality | Won |
| 2014 | Nigerian Broadcasters Merit Awards | Sexiest On-Air Personality | Nominated |
| 2014 | Nigerian Broadcasters Merit Awards | Outstanding Radio Program Presenter (s) (Drivetime 4pm-8pm) | Nominated |
| 2018 | City People Entertainment Awards | On-Air Personality Of the Year | Nominated |
| 2019 | City People Entertainment Awards | On-Air Personality Of the Year | Nominated |
