= The Witches and the Grinnygog =

- First edition (publ. Faber & Faber)
- Author: Dorothy Edwards
- Language: English
- Genre: Fantasy
- Publication date: 1981
- Publication place: England
- Media type: Print
- Awards: Shortlisted for the Whitbread Prize for Children's Book (1981)

The Witches and the Grinnygog is a children's novel by the writer Dorothy Edwards, published in 1981 and shortlisted for that year's Whitbread Prize for a children's book.

The Witches and the Grinnygog is a story of pre-Christian traditions, considered in the Middle Ages to be witchcraft, surviving into the modern world, and deals with various themes related to English folklore, ghosts and time slips.

== Plot summary ==
When an ancient English church is moved to a new site, one stone – a strange statue, the Grinnygog – is found to be missing. It is accidentally found by a woman who, not realizing its significance, gives it to her elderly father as a pseudo garden gnome. Shortly thereafter, three eccentric old women (who seem to be looking for something lost or hidden many years before) arrive in the town.
