= Under the Mountain (novel) =

Book by Maurice Gee

- Author: Maurice Gee
- Language: English
- Genre: Children's
- Publication place: New Zealand
- Media type: Print (hardback & paperback)
- ISBN: 0140313893

Under the Mountain is a 1979 children's book by New Zealand writer Maurice Gee. It has been adapted into a 1981 television miniseries, a 2009 film and stage show.

== Plot ==
Beneath the extinct volcanoes surrounding the city of Auckland, giant creatures are waking from a spellbound sleep that has lasted thousands of years. Their goal is the destruction of the world.

Rachel and Theo Matheson are twins. Apart from having red hair, neither of the twins believes there is anything remarkable about them – or so they think. They are horrified to discover that they have a strange and unexpected destiny. Only the Matheson twins can save the world from the terror of what is under the mountain.
