= Under the Mountain (miniseries) =

- Genre: Adventure / Drama / Family / Sci-Fi / Thriller
- Based on: Under the Mountain by Maurice Gee
- Screenplay by: Ken Catran
- Directed by: Chris Bailey
- Starring: Kirsty Wilkinson; Lance Warren; Roy Leywood; Bill Johnson
- Composer: Bernie Allen
- Country of origin: New Zealand
- Original language: English
- No. of seasons: 1
- No. of episodes: 8

Production
- Producer: Tom Finlayson
- Editor: Harley Oliver
- Running time: 24 minutes
- Production company: Television New Zealand

Original release
- Network: Television New Zealand
- Release: 6 October – 24 November 1981

Under the Mountain is an eight-part television series based on the 1979 novel of the same name written by Maurice Gee, first transmitted in 1981 and produced by Television New Zealand. Many of the minor roles in this series were played by people who were at the time well known performers in New Zealand.

== Series overview ==
=== Plot ===
The show focuses on twins Rachel and Theo Matheson. While on school summer holidays in Auckland, they are contacted by a man named Mr. Jones, who had met them briefly eight years earlier. This time, Mr. Jones reveals his true identity and mission. He is an alien—a member of the mysterious race called The People Who Understand and was sent from another world in a battle against another race of aliens. These latter creatures were a family of slimy, slug-like beasts who could take on human form. Led by the evil Mr. Wilberforce, the slug monsters were now bent on destroying Earth and only the twins' emerging psychic abilities could turn them back. The other major conflict presented by the series is that of Rachel and Theo's emerging abilities. Rachel accepted the truth of their abilities, while Theo was more of a cynic and often challenged Mr. Jones. The psychic abilities in the series increase in effectiveness as the individual grows in trust and acceptance of his or her abilities. In the final episode of the series, the twins are each required to throw a stone and focus their psychic energy into the stone to create a red and blue bridge-like construct that will defeat the Wilberforces. Because Theo's faith in his abilities and his belief in supernatural phenomena in general is lacking, his half of the bridge is insufficient to complete the construct. Mr. Jones uses the last of his life energy to complete the construct and defeat the Wilberforces, and can no longer be with Rachel and Theo as a result.

==== Episode guide ====
No.	Original title
1.	Maar
2.	Volcano of the Bleeding Skies
3.	Red Force, Blue Force
4.	The Alien World Below
5.	Weapons of the Mind
6.	Any Shape, Any Form
7.	Assault
8.	The Gift of Oblivion

=== Location ===
Filming for the farm & bush scenes in the first episode took place near Silverdale, North of Auckland, at Mt. Pleasant, an historic dairy farm & homestead in Pine Valley Road.

=== Cast and crew ===
- Kirsty Wilkinson as Rachel Matheson
- Lance Warren as Theo Matheson
- Roy Leywood as Mr. Jones
- Bill Johnson as Mr. Wilberforce
- Bill Ewens as Ricky
- Directed by: Chris Bailey
- Produced by: Tom Finlayson
- Written by: Maurice Gee
- Screenplay by: Ken Catran
- Music by: Bernie Allen

== Broadcast and release ==
=== International distribution ===
- In the Netherlands, the title is Moddermonsters (Mud Monsters) but also known as De Monsterplaneet (The Monster Planet).
- In the United States, it was shown on The Third Eye on Nickelodeon from the early 1980s.
- In Spain, a dubbed version was aired by Televisión Española in 1983.

=== Home video release ===
All eight episodes have been released on one dual-layer region-free (region 0) DVD in New Zealand.

=== Remake ===
In 2009 Under the Mountain was adapted into a New Zealand feature film with cameos by Kirsty Wilkinson and Bill Johnson, directed by Jonathan King.
