= 1978 in literature =

This article contains information about the literary events and publications of 1978.

== Events ==
- March 8 – Douglas Adams' comic science fiction series The Hitchhiker's Guide to the Galaxy originates as a radio comedy broadcast on the U.K. BBC Radio 4.
- March – Philip Larkin ends his relationships with Maeve Brennan and Betty Mackereth.
- April – James Blaylock's first published story, "The Ape-Box Affair", appears in Unearth magazine, pioneering steampunk fiction.
- August 1 – Barbara Pym is a guest on Desert Island Discs.
- October – The Bookseller/Diagram Prize for Oddest Title of the Year, a humorous award given annually to books with unusual titles, is launched at the Frankfurt Book Fair. The first winner is Proceedings of the Second International Workshop on Nude Mice.
- November 15 – Harold Pinter's play Betrayal, inspired by a seven-year clandestine extramarital affair with BBC Television presenter Joan Bakewell, opens at the National Theatre in London, directed by Peter Hall and featuring Penelope Wilton and her husband at this time, Daniel Massey, with Michael Gambon.
- December 15 – The Berlin State Library's new Haus Potsdamer Straße is opened in West Berlin's Kulturforum.
- unknown date – Antonia White's 1933 novel Frost in May becomes the first in Virago Press's Modern Classics series of reissues of books by neglected women authors, published in the UK.

== New books ==
=== Fiction ===
- Etel Adnan – Sitt Marie Rose
- Srikrishna Alanahalli – Parasangada Gendethimma
- Kingsley Amis – Jake's Thing
- Martin Amis – Success
- Jessica Anderson – Tirra Lirra by the River
- Aharon Appelfeld – Badenheim 1939 (באדנהיים עיר נופש, Badenhaim `ir nofesh)
- Richard Bach – Illusions
- Beryl Bainbridge – Young Adolf
- Thomas Berger – Arthur Rex: A Legendary Novel
- Thomas Bernhard – Yes (Ja)
- Adolfo Bioy Casares – The Hero of Women (El héroe de las mujeres)
- William Peter Blatty – The Ninth Configuration
- Judy Blume – Wifey
- Charles Bukowski – Women
- Anthony Burgess – 1985
- Taylor Caldwell – Bright Flows the River
- Chantal Chawaf – Rougeâtre
- John Cheever – The Stories of John Cheever
- C. J. Cherryh – Well of Shiuan
- Brian Cleeve – Judith
- Mary Elizabeth Counselman – Half in Shadow
- L. Sprague de Camp
  - The Best of L. Sprague de Camp
  - The Great Fetish
  - Conan the Swordsman (with Lin Carter and Björn Nyberg)
- Samuel R. Delany & Howard Chaykin – Empire: A Visual Novel
- Don DeLillo – Running Dog
- Nelson DeMille – By the Rivers of Babylon
- Phyllis Eisenstein – Born to Exile
- J. G. Farrell – The Singapore Grip
- Howard Fast – Second Generation
- Ken Follett – Eye of the Needle
- Alan Dean Foster – Splinter of the Mind's Eye
- Ernest J. Gaines – In My Father's House
- Jane Gardam – God on the Rocks
- Maurice Gee – Plumb (first in trilogy)
- Graham Greene – The Human Factor
- Harry Harrison – The Stainless Steel Rat Wants You
- Roy Heath – The Murderer
- James Herbert – The Spear
- William Hjortsberg – Falling Angel
- Timothy Mo – The Monkey King
- John Irving – The World According to Garp
- Marshall Jevons – Murder at the Margin
- James Jones – Whistle
- Ismail Kadare – The Three-Arched Bridge (Ura Me Tri Harqe)
- M. M. Kaye – The Far Pavilions
- Stephen King
  - The Stand
  - Night Shift (collection of short stories including "Children of the Corn")
- Christopher Koch – The Year of Living Dangerously
- Larry Kramer – Faggots
- Judith Krantz – Scruples
- Jaan Kross – The Czar's Madman (Keisri hull)
- Derek Lambert – The Saint Peter's Plot
- Camara Laye – Le Maître de la parole – Kouma Lafôlô Kouma (The Guardian of the Word)
- Ursula K. Le Guin – The Eye of the Heron
- Madeleine L'Engle – A Swiftly Tilting Planet
- Robert Ludlum – The Holcroft Covenant
- John D. MacDonald – The Empty Copper Sea
- David Malouf – An Imaginary Life
- Dambudzo Marechera – The House of Hunger
- Ngaio Marsh – Grave Mistake
- Richard Matheson – What Dreams May Come
- Ian McEwan – The Cement Garden
- James A. Michener – Chesapeake
- Patrick Modiano – Rue des boutiques obscures (translated as Missing Person)
- Alice Munro – Who Do You Think You Are? (The Beggar Maid: Stories of Flo and Rose in U.S.)
- Larry Niven – The Magic Goes Away
- Tim O'Brien – Going After Cacciato
- Andrew J. Offutt – Conan and the Sorcerer
- John L. Parker Jr. – Once a Runner
- Robert B. Parker – The Judas Goat
- Elizabeth Peters – Street of the Five Moons
- William Luther Pierce – The Turner Diaries
- Belva Plain – Evergreen
- Mario Puzo – Fools Die
- Mary Renault – The Praise Singer
- Ruth Rendell – A Sleeping Life
- Hubert Selby Jr. – Requiem for a Dream
- Jaswant Singh Kanwal – Lahoo Di Lo (Dawn of the Blood)
- Whitley Strieber – The Wolfen
- Thomas Sullivan – Diapason
- Julian Symons – The Blackheath Poisonings
- John Updike – The Coup
- Gore Vidal – Kalki
- Martin Walser – Runaway Horse
- William Wharton – Birdy
- Herman Wouk – War and Remembrance
- Richard Yates – A Good School
- Frank Yerby – Hail the Conquering Hero
- Roger Zelazny – The Courts of Chaos

=== Children and young people ===
- Janet and Allan Ahlberg – Each Peach, Pear, Plum (approximate year)
- Raymond Briggs – The Snowman
- Roald Dahl – The Enormous Crocodile
- Rumer Godden – A Kindle of Kittens
- Gwen Grant – Private – Keep Out
- Roger Hargreaves – Timbuctoo (first twelve of a series of 25 books)
- David Larkin (with Brian Froud and Alan Lee) – Faeries
- Bill Peet – Eli
- Lidia Postma – De Heksentuin (The Witch's Garden), in the Netherlands
- David Rees – The Exeter Blitz
- Seymour Reit (with Roberto Innocenti)
  - All Kinds of Planes
  - All Kinds of Ships
  - All Kinds of Trains
  - Sails, Rails, and Wings
- Louis Sachar – Sideways Stories from Wayside School (first in the Wayside School series of six books)
- Rosemary Sutcliff – Song for a Dark Queen
- Arnold Wesker – Fatlips: A Story for Children
- Arnulf Zitelmann (with Willi Glasauer) – Kleiner Weg (Small Trail)

=== Drama ===
- Miguel M. Abrahão – O Chifrudo
- Douglas Adams – The Hitchhiker's Guide to the Galaxy (radio play)
- Brian Clark – Whose Life Is It Anyway?
- Max Frisch – Tryptichon: Drei szenische Bilder (Triptych)
- David Hare – Plenty
- Arthur Kopit – Wings
- Ira Levin – Deathtrap
- Mary O'Malley – Once a Catholic
- Heiner Müller – Germania Death in Berlin (first performance)
- Harold Pinter – Betrayal
- Sam Shepard – Buried Child
- Martin Sherman – Bent
- Victoria Wood – Talent

=== Poetry ===
- Maya Angelou – And Still I Rise
- Robert Minhinnick – A Thread in the Maze
- Luis Alberto Spinetta – Guitarra Negra (Black Guitar)
- John Tripp – Collected Poems

=== Non-fiction ===
- Hannah Arendt (died 1975) – The Life of the Mind
- Gisela Bleibtreu-Ehrenberg – Tabu Homosexualität
- Roger Caron – Go-Boy! Memories of a Life Behind Bars
- Lord David Cecil – A Portrait of Jane Austen
- Charlotte Chandler – Hello, I Must Be Going!
- Beth Chatto – The Dry Garden
- Christina Crawford – Mommie Dearest
- Gerald Durrell – The Garden of the Gods
- Don E. Fehrenbacher – The Dred Scott Case: Its Significance in American Law and Politics
- John Gall – Systemantics
- H. R. Haldeman – The Ends of Power
- Mollie Katzen – Moosewood Cookbook
- Mary Midgley – Beast and Man: The Roots of Human Nature
- New York International Bible Society – Holy Bible, New International Version (translated into modern American English)
- Richard Nixon – The Memoirs of Richard Nixon
- M. Scott Peck – The Road Less Travelled
- David Rorvik – In his Image: The Cloning of a Man
- Edward Said – Orientalism

== Births ==
- February 1 – Arno Camenisch, Swiss writer
- April 4 - Robison Wells, American novelist
- April 20 – Rebecca Makkai, American novelist
- July 23 – Lauren Groff, American novelist and short story writer
- October 24 – Kei Miller, Jamaican-born poet and fiction writer
- November 2 - Ally Condie, American young-adult and middle grade novelist
- unknown dates
  - Filippo Bologna, Italian novelist and screenwriter
  - David Llewellyn, Welsh screenwriter
  - Samanta Schweblin, Argentine fiction writer
  - Rachel Trezise, Welsh novelist and short story writer

== Deaths ==
- January 12 – Robert Harbin, South African-born author of books on magic (born 1908)
- March 1 – Paul Scott, English novelist, playwright and poet (born 1920)
- March 24 – Leigh Brackett, American science fiction writer (born 1915)
- April 14 – F. R. Leavis, English academic literary critic (born 1895)
- May 1 – Sylvia Townsend Warner, English poet and novelist (born 1893)
- May 12 – Louis Zukofsky, American modernist poet (born 1904)
- June 11 – Carola Oman, English historical novelist, biographer and children's writer (born 1897)
- June 18 – Walter C. Alvarez, American medical author (born 1884)
- August 11 – Berta Ruck, Indian-born Welsh romantic novelist (born 1878)
- August 28 – Robert Shaw, English-born actor, novelist and playwright (born 1927)
- September 3 – Basil Willey, English academic literary critic (died 1897)
- September 9 – Hugh MacDiarmid (pen name of Christopher Murray Grieve), Scottish poet, journalist and essayist (born 1892)
- September 11 – Georgi Markov, Bulgarian dissident writer, broadcaster, playwright (born 1929)
- September 15 – Edmund Crispin (Robert Bruce Montgomery), English crime writer and composer (born 1921)
- September 28 – Pope John Paul I (Albino Luciani), Italian author of Illustrissimi (born 1912)
- November 5 – N. Crevedia, Romanian poet, novelist and journalist (born 1902)
- November 11 – Helena Boguszewska, Polish writer, columnist and a social activist (born 1883)
- November 15 – Margaret Mead, American cultural anthropologist and author (born 1901)
- December 15 – Ionel Gherea, Romanian philosopher, essayist and novelist (born 1895)

== Awards ==
- Nobel Prize for Literature: Isaac Bashevis Singer
- Bookseller/Diagram Prize for Oddest Title of the Year is first awarded. The winner is Proceedings of the Second International Workshop on Nude Mice.

=== Canada ===
- See 1978 Governor General's Awards for a complete list of winners and finalists for those awards.

=== France ===
- Prix Goncourt: Patrick Modiano, Rue des boutiques obscures
- Prix Médicis:
  - French: Georges Perec, La Vie mode d'emploi
  - International: Aleksandr Zinovyev, L'Avenir radieux – USSR

=== Spain ===
- Miguel de Cervantes Prize: Dámaso Alonso

=== United Kingdom ===
- Booker Prize: Iris Murdoch, The Sea, The Sea
- Carnegie Medal for children's literature: David Rees, The Exeter Blitz
- Cholmondeley Award: Christopher Hope, Leslie Norris, Peter Reading, D.M. Thomas, R.S. Thomas
- Eric Gregory Award: Ciarán Carson, Peter Denman, Christopher Reid, Paul Wilkins, Martyn A. Ford, James Sutherland-Smith
- James Tait Black Memorial Prize:
  - Fiction: Maurice Gee, Plumb
  - Biography: Robert Gittings, The Older Hardy

=== United States ===
- American Academy of Arts and Letters Gold Medal for Fiction, Peter Taylor
- Nebula Award: Vonda McIntyre, Dreamsnake
- Newbery Medal for children's literature: Katherine Paterson, Bridge to Terabithia
- Pulitzer Prize:
  - Drama: Donald L. Coburn, The Gin Game
  - Fiction: James Alan McPherson, Elbow Room
  - Poetry: Howard Nemerov, Collected Poems
- Hugo Award for Best Novella: Spider Robinson and Jeanne Robinson, Stardance

=== Elsewhere ===
- Friedenspreis des Deutschen Buchhandels: Astrid Lindgren
- Miles Franklin Award: Jessica Anderson, Tirra Lirra by the River
- Premio Nadal: Germán Sánchez Espeso, Narciso
- Viareggio Prize: Antonio Altomonte, Dopo il presidente
