= João Vitti =

Brazilian actor (born 1967)

- Born: João Luis Vitti; October 30, 1967 (age 58); Piracicaba, São Paulo, Brazil
- Occupation: Actor
- Years active: 1983–present
- Spouse: Valéria Alencar (m. 1996)
- Children: 2, including Rafael

João Luis Vitti (born October 30, 1967), usually known as João Vitti, is a Brazilian theatre and telenovela actor.

In 1992, as Vitti was studying theatre at Unicamp in São Paulo, he entered the casting of Rede Globo. Vitti achieved national sensation through his participation in the soap opera Despedida de Solteiro, played the role of "Xampu".

He has won the Best Actor award in the 3º FESTE (Festival Salesiano de Teatro Educativo) in São Paulo, for his role in Pássaro da Manhã 1994, a play written by Miguel M. Abrahão.

On stage, among the important roles he did were, A Escola (which marked his entry into theatre), 1983, play written by Miguel M. Abrahão, Angels in America, 1993, by Tony Kushner, As Traças da Paixão, by Alcides Nogueira, 2005, Little Eyolf, 2006, play written by Henrik Ibsen.

== Personal life ==
Vitti began dating fellow actress Valéria Alencar in 1994. They were married in 1996 and have two sons, the actors Rafael Vitti and Francisco Vitti. Vitti is a convert to Nichiren Buddhism.

== Select filmography ==
Year	Title	Role	Network
2012	Rebelde (remake) (telenovela)	Bob Nelson	Rede Record
2010	Uma Rosa com Amor (remake) (telenovela)	Carlos	SBT
2007	Luz do Sol (telenovela)	Gregório Mendes Corrêa	Rede Record
2006	Alta Estação (telenovela)	Gustavo Pereira	Rede Record
2005	Avassaladoras (series)	Celso Steiner	Rede Record
2005	Essas Mulheres (telenovela)	Paulo Silva	Rede Record
2004	Um Só Coração (series)	Abílio	Rede Globo
2001	O Direito de Nascer (telenovela)	Jorge Luiz	SBT
2000	O Cravo e a Rosa (telenovela)	Serafim Amaral	Rede Globo
1997	Direito de Vencer (telenovela)	Carlo	Rede Record
1997	A Filha do Demônio (telenovela)	Demônio	Rede Record
1996	O Campeão (telenovela)	Weber	Rede Bandeirantes
1994	Éramos Seis (telenovela)	Lúcio	SBT
1992	De Corpo e Alma (telenovela)	Fernando Azevedo ("Nando")	Rede Globo
1992	Despedida de Solteiro (telenovela)	Xampu	Rede Globo
1992	Perigosas Peruas (telenovela)	special participation	Rede Globo
1990	Boca do Lixo (series)	special participation	Rede Globo
1990	Brasileiras e Brasileiros (telenovela)	special participation	SBT
