= The Turbulent Term of Tyke Tiler =

1977 novel by Gene Kemp

- Front cover of first edition
- Author: Gene Kemp
- Illustrator: Carolyn Dinan (1977); Kenny McKendry (1994)
- Language: English
- Series: Cricklepit
- Genre: Children's adventure novel, day school story, comedy
- Publisher: Faber and Faber
- Publication date: 7 February 1977
- Publication place: United Kingdom
- Media type: Print (hardback and paperback)
- Pages: 118 pp (first edition)
- ISBN: 0571109667
- OCLC: 3224554
- LC Class: PZ7.K3055 Tu
- Followed by: Gowie Corby Plays Chicken

The Turbulent Term of Tyke Tiler (or Tyke Tiler) is a children's school adventure novel by Gene Kemp, first published by Faber and Faber in 1977 with illustrations by Carolyn Dinan. It is set at Cricklepit Combined School, a fictional primary school based on St Sidwell's School in Exeter where Kemp worked as a teacher from 1963 to 1979. The book inaugurated a series of further stories by Kemp set at the same school. Tyke Tiler follows the final term of Tyke, an adventurous twelve-year-old, at Cricklepit Combined School. After Tyke's best friend Danny gets into various scrapes, Tyke has to protect and stick up for him despite Danny being misunderstood by teachers and other students.

The book depicts themes that include attitudes towards disability and gender. Throughout the book, Tyke's gender is not explicitly revealed, although the character's attitudes and actions often lead readers to believe that Tyke is a boy. The story ends with the revelation that Tyke is a girl. Tyke Tiler was praised by critics and was the recipient of the Carnegie Medal for children's literature in 1977.

== Plot ==
The book tells the story of Tyke Tiler's final term at Cricklepit Combined School. Tyke Tiler is a twelve-year-old with the reputation of being a troublemaker. Tyke's best friend Danny Price is often the source of the trouble. Tyke is forced to help Danny after he steals a £10 note from a teacher, accidentally lets his pet mouse loose in assembly, and gets Tyke to retrieve a sheep's skeleton from a nearby leat. Danny has a speech defect which means Tyke often has to translate for him. Although Danny is misunderstood by others around him, Tyke knows that he is funny, kind, and means well.

One afternoon, Tyke goes to the headteacher's office and overhears some teachers discussing the possibility of Danny going to a special school instead of the local comprehensive. Tyke then decides to help Danny cheat in the annual verbal reasoning test to ensure they can both attend the same local secondary school, Dawson Comprehensive. Danny scores high enough to avoid being sent to a special school, but Tyke accidentally scores too high and the headmaster is keen for Tyke to attend the prestigious Dorrington School for gifted children, much to the joy of Tyke's mother. Tyke's father, a local councilor campaigning for re-election, is against privilege and is reluctant to send his child there. Tyke tries to reveal the truth about cheating on the test but gives up after nobody believes her, and her sister tells her that her father will not make her attend this establishment.

When Tyke is off school sick, Danny is accused of stealing a gold watch belonging to a teacher called Mrs Somers and flees the school before the police arrive. Suspecting that the actual thieves are school bullies Martin Kneeshaw and Kevin Simms, Tyke tries to convince the headmaster that they framed Danny.

Tyke finds Danny sleeping in his and Tyke's secret hideout, the derelict local paper mill. After Danny returns home, Tyke decides to abandon the hideout after realizing it is no longer a place for secrets and adventures.

On the last day of school, Tyke recalls the story of an old pupil of the school, Thomas Tiler (possibly an ancestor) who was caned in front of the whole school nearly a century earlier for climbing the tower and ringing the school bell. Tyke climbs up the outside of the school and rings the school bell which has been abandoned and unused for more than 30 years, despite objections from pupils and teachers. It is at this stage that Tyke is addressed as "Theodora Tiler" by Mrs Somers – revealing that Tyke is a girl.

A postscript written from the point of view of Tyke's teacher, Mr Merchant, describes how the old bell tower collapsed and Tyke ended up in hospital with a broken arm, a broken ankle, bruising, and concussion. In the hospital, Tyke confesses to Mr Merchant about cheating in the verbal reasoning test and tells him all about the final term at school – namely her efforts to help Danny. Mr Merchant enjoys Tyke's story and decides to write it down.

Up to the end of the penultimate chapter, the narrative is written without directly revealing the protagonist's sex, although the characteristics suggest that Tyke is a boy. The story ends with the revelation that Tyke is a girl, her full name being Theodora Tiler.

== Themes ==
=== Gender ===
Throughout the majority of The Turbulent Term of Tyke Tiler, Tyke's gender is not disclosed, neither by other characters nor in the text. The story can therefore be described as having an ungendered narrative. All but the final chapter is narrated from Tyke's first-person perspective, which limits the use of gendered pronouns. The dialogue of other characters similarly avoids the use of gendered pronouns by, for example, using the word "child" to describe Tyke. It is revealed near the beginning of the story that 'Tyke' is a nickname. The reader learns that Tyke's character despises her real name, which is not uncovered until the end of the story, along with her gender.

She [Mrs. Somers] used my real name, the one I hate, so I pulled my worst, most horrible face at her, the slit-eyed, yellow-tooth, ears-wiggling monster-from-the-center-of-the-earth one.

— Gene Kemp, The Turbulent Term of Tyke Tiler, Chapter One

Only at that moment, Mrs Somers came round the corner, stopped, spoke to Sir, looked up, saw me and shouted, her face red and corrugated: "Get down at once, Theodora Tiler, you naughty, disobedient girl!"

— Gene Kemp, The Turbulent Term of Tyke Tiler, Chapter Fourteen

The daring nature of Tyke's exploits and behaviours – such as fighting, climbing the bell tower, and protecting Danny – often lead readers to assume Tyke is a boy. The name 'Tyke' itself is gendered with connotations of roughness and maleness. The other characters in the story too are stereotypical of their gender: the headmaster of the school is referred to by Tyke as "Chief Sir" and is depicted as powerful with a deep voice; the student teacher Miss Honeywell is described as being pretty; Tyke's father is authoritative; Tyke's sister Beryl is interested in her boyfriend and makeup. The final chapter of the novel is a postscript written from the point of view of Mr Merchant, Tyke's teacher. Tyke's gender is confirmed again to be female and for the first time in the book the character is described as "she".

In the book Twentieth-Century Children's Writers, Mary Cadogan writes how Tyke Tiler "demolishes many accepted ideas about aspirational and experiential differences between boys and girls." Although the novel does challenge gendered stereotypes with its twist reveal at the end, in a chapter on the representation of girls in literature in the book Teaching English, Susan Brindley argues that Tyke Tiler "is, in effect, presenting non-stereotypical girls as abnormal – and as such supports the dominant ideology." Brindley writes that the idea of Tyke's real gender being a revelation reinforces "sexist roles in society". She states how some readers feel that they have been "made fools of" when discovering Tyke's true gender. Kery Mallan in the book Gender Dilemmas in Children's Fiction calls this discovery a "narrative deceit". Bhagirath Khuman and Madhumita Ghosal write that reactions like these to Tyke Tiler demonstrate the strange notion that "supposedly male characteristics are only suitable to boys' characters and that that is how they should be portrayed." Furthermore, they write that rather than being a "narrative deceit", the revelation of Tyke's gender shows how readers have to challenge their own false beliefs about gender roles.

After discovering Tyke's gender, the reader is – as Victor Watson comments in his article on multi-layered texts – "in the know", and thus the book warrants re-reading. Furthermore, he writes how the illustrations throughout the book add to this new perspective as the reader now knows the images depict a girl character.

=== Disability ===
In the book, Tyke Tiler's relationship with her friend Danny Price represents a child's perspective of how children with disabilities are treated by others and typified by adults. The character of Danny has limited ability and a speech defect which does not go unnoticed by Tyke. Near the beginning of the story, she calls him "as thick as two planks" and shouts to him that he is an "idiotic imbecile" after stealing a £10 note. However, throughout the story she recognises that there is more to Danny than the teachers at their school realise, who discuss whether Danny should be segregated from other children, including Tyke, and sent to a special school. In the book Disability in Modern Children's Fiction, John Quicke writes that this shows how Tyke "resents Danny being typed, just as she resents people... attempting to type her." Furthermore, Mary Anne Prater writes how this book is an example of a story where a character with learning difficulties attends a school which is identified as an inappropriate environment.

Mrs Somers said in a voice like a dentist's drill:

"I can't agree. Danny Price must be sent to the Russell Dene school they have the facilities to deal with children of that type."

I wanted to cry out that Danny Price, my friend, was not a child of that type, that he was funny and nice and all right, and that I could tell what he said perfectly clearly and that he would be unhappy without me around.

— Gene Kemp, The Turbulent Term of Tyke Tiler, Chapter Seven

In the story, Tyke decides to cheat on her school's annual Verbal Reasoning Test and teach Danny the answers so he will not be sent to the special school. Prater calls this action a "pupil and instructor" relationship, notable due to the fact it is between two schoolchildren rather than a teacher and pupil. Throughout the book, Tyke protects and cares for Danny. Catherine Nichols writes how this kind of relationship functions as a way to demonstrate to the reader that the protagonist is a good person, rather than giving Danny more to do in the story.

=== Chivalry and heroism ===
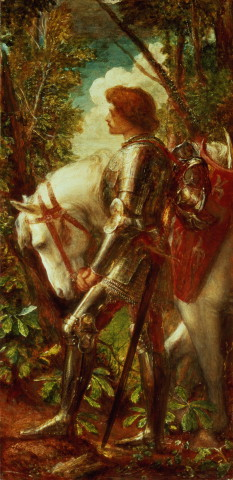
The character Danny Price is given the part of Sir Galahad in the school play and is inspired by the character's description "His strength was as the strength of ten, because his heart was pure".

There is an emphasis throughout the book on chivalry and heroism. When writing the book, Gene Kemp was keen for the schoolchildren in the story to have a background topic which they would learn about throughout their final term. Kemp chose King Arthur as the topic because she was inspired by the novel The Sword in the Stone, considering it to be one of the finest children's books ever written. In an article on Arthurian antecedents in The Turbulent Term of Tyke Tiler, Gill Vickery writes that the novel itself "is built on a framework of Arthurian myth and legend". In the novel, the student teacher Miss Honeywell reads T. H. White's The Once and Future King to Tyke's class, which they later perform as a play. The characters in the book largely resemble the characters they play in this performance: the part of King Arthur goes to Tyke's trusted friend Ian Pitt, the cunning Guinevere and Morgan le Fay go to unfavourable classmates Linda Stoatway and Lorraine Fairchild, and the part of noble Sir Galahad goes to Danny Price. In the story, Danny in particular is pleased to be compared to Sir Galahad and is inspired by the description "His strength was as the strength of ten, because his heart was pure". He resolves to live up to this comparison, which makes Tyke realise that he could not have stolen Mrs Somers' watch.

Settings and plots in the story also follow tropes similar to those found in classic myth and legend. In the story, Tyke's confrontation with the headmaster after Danny is accused of stealing Mrs Somers' watch is comparable to a hero entering a dragon's lair. Tyke and Danny's hideout – an old watermill – is ultimately abandoned by the pair and is described by Vickery as "an imprisoning tower". The tantalising bell tower is the Holy Grail of the story with Tyke ultimately succumbing to its temptation, ringing the bell and facing the consequences when the bell tower collapses.

== Background ==
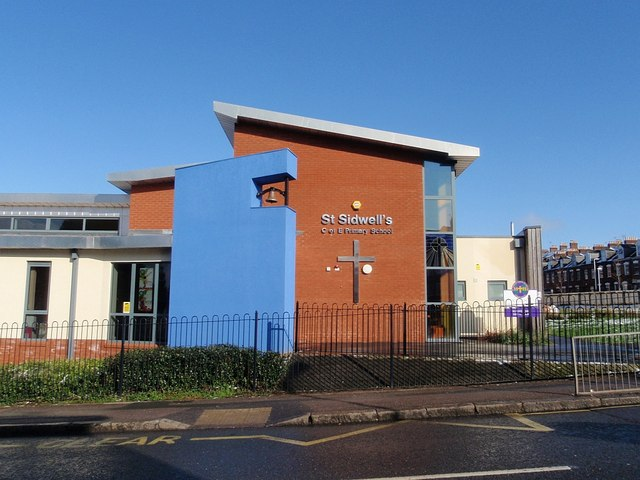
Gene Kemp taught at St Sidwell's Church of England Primary School, Exeter (pictured in 2009) which was the inspiration for Cricklepit Combined School. It also has a bell tower like the one Tyke climbs towards the end of the book.

Tyke Tiler was preceded by Kemp's novel The Prime of Tamworth Pig (1972), which was the first in a series of five books about an intelligent pig and his friend, a boy named Thomas. These stories were centred around infant school children in the countryside. Tyke Tiler signalled a departure from that focus, instead being about older children in an urban setting with a plot more akin to everyday reality. Tyke Tiler is the first in a series of stories set in the fictional Cricklepit Primary School, which is based on St Sidwell's Primary School in Exeter where Kemp taught from 1963 to 1979. Gene Kemp drew upon her experience as a primary school teacher when writing the book. The characters and setting were praised for resembling "real" schoolchildren and teachers, along with Kemp's "experienced ear for the lore and language of the upper juniors". Kemp herself stated "The actuality of children's lives – the long daydreamings, desultory conversations, desultory play, is very rarely dealt with in children's books." After the success of Tyke Tiler, Kemp left the teaching profession and became a full-time writer.

Tyke Tiler was first published by Faber and Faber in 1977 with illustrations by Carolyn Dinan. The illustrations are drawn in such a way that the gender of Tyke remains ambiguous throughout the story. The book was reprinted in 1979, 1994, 2002, 2006, and 2015.

== Reception ==
The Turbulent Term of Tyke Tiler is Kemp's best-known book and won the annual Carnegie Medal in 1977, which recognises the year's best children's book by a British subject. She also won an "Other Award" from the Children's Rights Workshop for a book which focussed on non-discriminatory representations of gender, race, class, or disability. Winning both of these awards for a book was a rare occurrence. Tyke Tiler was a character which challenged the trends of the 1970s when there was a lack of strong female protagonists in children's literature. In a 1986 review for The School Librarian, Elizabeth K. King wrote that the book "blew like a fresh wind through the world of children's literature, leaving a crowd of cheering girls and very perplexed boys in its wake." The book was also praised for its depiction of growing up and attitudes towards authority.

== Adaptations ==
The author adapted the novel as a play, published under the same title by Oxford University Press in 2003. It was written to support the KS3 (pupils aged 11–14) Framework for Teaching English. A television adaptation was made by Yorkshire Television and broadcast on ITV in 1988 as part of The Book Tower. The script was adapted by Richard Callanan and the programme was split into eight episodes. It starred 'Tyke' Curtis as Tyke and Robert Rumsby as Danny.

Awards
| Preceded by Thunder and Lightnings | Carnegie Medal recipient 1977 | Succeeded by The Exeter Blitz |
