= Passaro =

Passaro is a surname. Notable people with the surname include:

- Alan Passaro, Hells Angel member who stabbed Meredith Hunter to death
- Bruno Passaro (born 1989), Argentine Olympic show jumping rider
- David Paden Passaro (born 1975), the birth name of the American singer and musician known professionally as Davey Havok
- David Passaro, former CIA contractor convicted for assaulting Abdul Wali
- Dino Fava Passaro (born 1977), Italian footballer
- Dulce Pássaro (born 1953), Portuguese engineer and politician
- Francesco Passaro (born 2001), Italian tennis player
- Nevio Passaro (born 1980), German–Italian singer, songwriter and producer
- Stefania Passaro (born 1963), Italian retired basketball player, a journalist and a certified European Financial Planner

== See also ==
- Battle of Cape Passaro
- Cape Passaro, Sicily, Italy
- Cidade Pássaro, the Portuguese name of the drama film Shine Your Eyes
- Pássaro da Manhã, a theatrical one-act drama
- Passaro's triangle, a presumptive region in the abdomen
