= Hello I Must Be Going =

Hello, I Must Be Going may refer to:

== Film and TV ==
=== Film ===
- Hello I Must Be Going (2012 film), a 2012 film directed by Todd Louiso
- Hello I Must Be Going (2014 film), a 2014 film directed by Courteney Cox

=== TV ===
- Hello, I Must Be Going (Casualty), the 2016 episode (Series 30, Episode 34) of the British medical drama Casualty.

== Music ==
- "Hello, I Must Be Going" (song), a song by Bert Kalmar and Harry Ruby, made famous by Groucho Marx
- Hello, I Must Be Going! (album), a 1982 album by Phil Collins

== Books ==
- Hello, I Must Be Going! (book), a biography of Groucho Marx by Charlotte Chandler
