= A Casa =

A Casa may refer to:

- A Casa, a 2002 fantasy novel by André Vianco
- A Casa (play), a 1978 theatrical comedy play by Miguel M. Abrahão
- A Casa (TV series), a Brazilian reality television game show
- "A Casa", a paradoxical poem by Brazilian writer Vinicius de Moraes

== See also ==
- The House (disambiguation)
