= Murder at the Margin =

1978 novel by Kenneth G. Elzinga

First edition (publ. Thomas Horton & Daughters)

Murder at the Margin (1978) is a whodunnit written by U.S. economists William Breit and Kenneth G. Elzinga using the joint pseudonym Marshall Jevons. The novel introduces Harvard economist Henry Spearman, a small, middle-aged, balding man who, when faced with murder, turns into an amateur sleuth who solves crimes by means of economic reasoning.

== See also ==
- The Fatal Equilibrium (1985)
