= The Fatal Equilibrium =

1985 novel by Marshall Jevons

- First edition cover
- Author: Marshall Jevons
- Publisher: MIT Press
- Publication date: October 1, 1985
- ISBN: 0-345-33158-3

The Fatal Equilibrium is a mystery novel published under the pen name Marshall Jevons, which was written by William L. Breit and Kenneth G. Elzinga, both of whom are professors of economics. The book introduces many examples of economics theory and has been used as supplementary reading in many introductory courses in economics.

== Plot ==
The book follows Dennis Gossen, an economist whose career and life are cut short by the Harvard Promotion and Tenure Committee and an apparent suicide. When two members of that committee are killed, Gossen's fiancee, Melissa Shannon, finds herself indicted for murder. Once again, Henry Spearman, Professor of Economics at Harvard, finds himself on the track of a murderer and once again Marshall Jevons presents his readers with a captivating murder mystery riddle.

Was it Morrison Bell, mathematics star, inventor of devices to defeat the squirrels in his birdfeeders? Or was it owl-like Oliver Wu, the distinguished sociologist who harbors deep resentments? Was it Valerie Danzig, supposedly former "item" with Dennis Gossen? Or maybe Foster Barrett, gourmet Harvard classicist? What about Cristolph Burckhardt, infatuated employer of Gossen's fiancee? Or Sophia Ustinov, Russian emigre, lover of American poetry and Borzoi hounds? Three lives come to an end. And when Spearman begins to piece it together, the murderer and Henry find themselves face to face on a luxury liner in a storm at sea in the fourth and final Fatal Equilibrium. For the reader who follows the clues, the solution to this conundrum is, as usual in the best of this genre, elementary. The difference in this case is that it is elementary economics.

The Fatal Equilibrium is a mystery novel that provides a grasp of basic economics on the way to finding out whodunnit. Its predecessor, Murder at the Margin, has already achieved a cult following. In a review of Jevons' earlier book, The Wall Street Journal remarked that "if there is a more painless way to learn economic principles, scientists must have recently discovered how to implant them in ice cream."

== Background ==
Marshall Jevons is a fictitious crime writer invented and used by William L. Breit and Kenneth G. Elzinga, professors of economics at Trinity University, San Antonio and the University of Virginia, respectively. It was Breit's notion to write a mystery novel in which an amateur detective uses economic theory to solve crimes. Elzinga was enthusiastic about his colleague's idea and not only encouraged him to proceed but also decided to take an active role in writing the book. Over the next twenty years, on top of their academic schedules, Breit and Elzinga co-authored three mystery books featuring Harvard economist-sleuth Henry Spearman. The first Henry Spearman Mystery, 'Murder at the Margin, came out in 1978, and was followed by The Fatal Equilibrium (1985) and A Deadly Indifference (1995).

When, in 1978, after a three-year collaboration, the two economists' first foray into crime fiction was eventually published by Thomas Horton and Daughters, there was no indication on the book cover as to the true identity of the authors. Rather, Elzinga had concocted a fanciful biography of Marshall Jevons which read:

Marshall Jevons is the President of UtilMax, Inc., an international consulting firm headquartered in New York City. A former Rhodes Scholar, he holds advanced degrees in economics, biochemistry, and oceanography. Mr. Jevons is an Olympic medal holder in kayaking whose hobbies now include rocketry and the futures market in cocoa beans. He is a native of Virginia but prefers to call 'home' the Queen Elizabeth 2. This is Marshall Jevons' first novel.

However, in subsequent editions of the book, Breit and Elzinga's authorship was recognized. Murder at the Margin has since been used as supplementary reading in many introductory courses in economics. In commercial terms the novel was a success, and MIT Press approached the authors to suggest they write another Henry Spearman Mystery which they would publish. Thus, in 1985, The Fatal Equilibrium became the first mystery novel to be published by a university press. One year later, a mass market paperback was issued, prompting Marshall Jevons to comment that “there are few pleasures more satisfying than seeing one's own paperback in a book rack at an airport newsstand”.

The name Marshall Jevons derives from the surnames of two 19th-century English economists, Alfred Marshall and William Stanley Jevons.

A blog about economics called "The Bayesian Heresy" has also adopted the pseudonym.

== Style ==
The Fatal Equilibrium is a "British traditional" within the mystery genre. It has no explicit sex or violence. British traditionals are written as cerebral works of the mind, rather than adrenaline (e.g., Emma Lathen, Ellery Queen, Dorothy Sayers, G. K. Chesterton, Agatha Christie).
