= As Comadres =

1978 theatrical comedy by Miguel M. Abrahão

- Author: Miguel M. Abrahão
- Language: Brazilian Portuguese
- Genre: Comedy
- Publisher: Editora Shekinah (1981) and Editora Agbook(2009)
- Publication date: 1978
- Publication place: Brazil

As Comadres is a theatrical comedy in two acts, written by Miguel M. Abrahão in 1978 and published first in 1981 in Brazil.

== Plot summary ==
Beth Beast, feminist leader, reversing the prevailing values and seeking to take over and lead women around the country to assume a dominant position and autocratic before men, resolves to promote a congress in his home in order to educate the girls of the true status of women in society. The problem occurs when Amelia, submissive neighbor, decides to participate in discussions and carries with her husband Almeida, a typical macho incorrigible.

== Bibliography ==
- COUTINHO, Afrânio; SOUSA, J. Galante de. Enciclopédia de literatura brasileira. São Paulo: Global; Rio de Janeiro: Fundação Biblioteca Nacional, Academia Brasileira de Letras, 2001: 2v.
- Sociedade Brasileira de Autores Teatrais
- National Library of Brazil - Archives
- Newspaper Archive of the Institute of History and Geography of Piracicaba
- The Journal Tribune of Piracicaba - Issue of August 25, 1981
