= Kenneth G. Elzinga =

American economist

Kenneth G. Elzinga is the Robert C. Taylor Professor of Economics at the University of Virginia. He is an antitrust expert and co-authored a highly successful quartet of murder mystery novels in which the sleuth, dubbed Henry Spearman, solves the murder using principles of economics.

Elzinga's antitrust expertise led the U.S. Supreme Court to its 5–4 decision on June 28, 2007, in Leegin Creative Leather Products, Inc. v. PSKS, Inc. that minimum retail pricing schemes, formerly treated automatically as illegal under the Sherman Antitrust Act, may offer benefits to consumers.

His novels are written under the pseudonym Marshall Jevons, a mixture of economics pathfinders Alfred Marshall and William Stanley Jevons in collaboration with now-deceased Trinity University professor William L. Breit (1933–2011).

== Publishing and accolades ==
Elzinga's academic career began with his B.A. from Kalamazoo College (1963). He went on to earn both his masters (1966) and his Ph.D. from Michigan State (1967). His career has already spanned over 40 years, and he currently holds a distinguished chair at the University of Virginia. Himself the first winner of the UVA "Cavaliers’ Distinguished Teaching Professorship," Elzinga's scholarship has been recognized by the Southern Economic Association with an annual Distinguished Teaching award in his name.

He has served as a Cambridge Fellow and currently serves on the editorial boards of The Journal of Markets and Morality and The Antitrust Bulletin. His scholarly work has appeared in the leading journals of economics, with the Florida State's Gus A. Stavros Center praising him as "probably the nation's most successful teacher of college-level economics."

He served as a key plaintiff's witness in the government's 2004 antitrust case against Oracle Corporation over the acquisition of PeopleSoft, a case that the government lost. The court chose to reject Elzinga's economic analysis.

His CV that was filed as an exhibit in the above case lists more than 50 publications on such topics as airline deregulation, cartels, predatory pricing, and even the beer industry. He has won the UVA Alumni Association's Distinguished Professor Award, the Commonwealth of Virginia's Outstanding Faculty Award. And in 1992, he received the highest honor that UVA can bestow upon a faculty member, the Thomas Jefferson Award.

His co-authored mystery titles are Murder at the Margin (Thomas Norton & Daughters, 1978), The Fatal Equilibrium (The MIT Press, 1985), and A Deadly Indifference (Carrol & Graf, 1995). Also with Breit, he is co-author of The Antitrust Casebook: Milestones in Economic Regulation (Dryden Press, 1982).

Elzinga currently teaches at the University of Virginia. As of 2014 there is a campaign to raise $3 million to fund the Kenneth G. Elzinga Professorship in Economics and the Law at the University of Virginia's Department of Economics.

== Policy positions ==
In 2009, Elzinga was one of over 200 economists who signed an ad placed in newspapers by the libertarian Cato Institute opposing the Obama Administration's stimulus bill.
