= Half in Shadow =

Anthology

- Dust-jacket illustration by Tim Kirk for Half in Shadow
- Author: Mary Elizabeth Counselman
- Illustrator: frontispiece by Tim Kirk
- Cover artist: Tim Kirk
- Language: English
- Genre: Fantasy, Horror short stories
- Publisher: Arkham House
- Publication date: 1978
- Publication place: United States
- Media type: Print (hardback)
- Pages: ix, 212 pp
- ISBN: 0-87054-081-5
- OCLC: 4166637
- Dewey Decimal: 813/.5/4
- LC Class: PZ4.C862 Hal PS3553.O85

Half in Shadow is a collection of stories by author Mary Elizabeth Counselman. Most of the stories had macabre or horror themes, and appeared previously in the magazine Weird Tales from the late 1930s through the 1950s. It includes the story "The Three Marked Pennies" one of the most popular in the magazine's history based on reader response.

The book had first been published as a fourteen story collection (six stories not in the later Arkham House edition) as a Consul paperback by World Distributors, UK, in 1964. It was released in 1978 by Arkham House with fourteen stories (six not in the earlier UK edition) and was the author's first hardcover book. It was published in an edition of 4,288 copies. The jacket and frontispiece are by Tim Kirk. There has also been a reprint - London: William Kimber, 1980.

== Contents ==
Half in Shadow contains the following tales:

1. "Preface"
2. "The Three Marked Pennies"
3. "The Unwanted"
4. "The Shot-Tower Ghost"
5. "Night Court"
6. "The Monkey Spoons"
7. "The Smiling Face"
8. "A Death Crown for Mr. Hapworthy"
9. "The Black Stone Statue"
10. "Seventh Sister"
11. "Parasite Mansion"
12. "The Green Window"
13. "The Tree's Wife"
14. "Twister"
15. "A Handful of Silver"
