= Gene Kemp =

English children's book author (1926–2015)

- Born: Gene Rushton; 27 December 1926 Wigginton, England, United Kingdom
- Died: 4 January 2015 (aged 88)
- Occupation: writer, journalist
- Notable works: The Turbulent Term of Tyke Tiler; Gowie Corby Plays Chicken
- Spouse: Norman Pattison (divorced) Allan Kemp (died 1990)
- Children: 3

Gene Kemp née Rushton (27 December 1926 – 4 January 2015) was an English author known for children's books. Her first, The Prime of Tamworth Pig, appeared in 1972. She won the British Carnegie Medal for her school novel The Turbulent Term of Tyke Tiler (1977).

== Background ==
Kemp was born in Wigginton, Staffordshire in 1926 to Alice (née Sutton) and Albert Rushton, grew up near Tamworth, Staffordshire, and went to Exeter University. She became a teacher and taught at St Sidwell's School in Exeter in the 1970s.

From 1972 she wrote stories for young readers about a pig named Tamworth, named after the town she grew up in. Kemp found inspiration for many of the characters in her books amongst the friends of her children, Chantal and Richard.

Her best known book is The Turbulent Term of Tyke Tiler, published by Faber's Children's Books in 1977. Set in the fictional Cricklepit School, it charts the pleasures and pains of friendship and growing up. There are several Cricklepit books, including Snaggletooth's Mystery, an alternative history of the school, and Gowie Corby Plays Chicken, set one year after The Turbulent Term of Tyke Tiler and referencing Tyke in several chapters.

Kemp wrote ghost stories and fantasy as well as realistic fiction, like Seriously Weird, which is told from the perspective of the sister of a young man with Asperger syndrome. She also dramatised some of her work, the most successful and well-known of these being Charlie Lewis Plays for Time, another Cricklepit story.

Kemp was awarded an Honorary MA from Exeter University in 1984. She lived in Exeter and had three children – a daughter, Judith, from her first marriage to Norman Pattison, which ended in divorce, and another daughter, Chantal, and a son, Richard, from her second marriage, to Allan Kemp, who died in 1990. She had three grandchildren and two great-grandsons. Kemp died at the age of 88 on 4 January 2015.

== Awards ==
- Kemp won two awards for The Turbulent Term of Tyke Tiler (1997): the annual Carnegie Medal from the Library Association, for the year's best children's book by a British subject, and one from the Children's Rights Workshop.
- She made the Smarties Prize shortlist four times, in 1981 for The Clock Tower Ghost, 1985 for Charlie Lewis Plays for Time, 1986 for Juniper and 1990 for Just Ferret.

== Selected works ==
As editor

- Ducks and Dragons
- The Puffin Book of Ghosts and Ghouls

Cricklepit series

- The Turbulent Term of Tyke Tiler (1977)
- Gowie Corby Plays Chicken (1981)
- Charlie Lewis Plays for Time (1984)
- Just Ferret (1990)
- Zowey Corby's Story (1995)
- Zowey Corby and the Black Cat Tunnel (1996)
- Snaggletooth's Mystery (2002)

Other books as author

- Dog Days and Cat Naps (1980)
- The Clock Tower Ghost (1981)
- Jason Bodger and the Priory Ghost (1985)
- Juniper (1986)
- Mr Magus is Waiting for You (1986)
- I Can't Stand Losing (1987)
- The Well (1988)
- No Place Like (1989)
- Seriously Weird (2003)
- The Haunted Piccolo (2004)
- Nothing Scares Me (2006)
