= 1978 Governor General's Awards =

Canadian literary award

Each winner of the 1978 Governor General's Awards for Literary Merit was selected by a panel of judges administered by the Canada Council for the Arts.

== English language ==
- Fiction: Alice Munro, Who Do You Think You Are?
- Poetry or Drama: Patrick Lane, Poems New and Selected.
- Non-Fiction: Roger Caron, Go-Boy! Memories of a Life Behind Bars.

== French language ==
- Fiction: Jacques Poulin, Les grandes marées.
- Poetry or Drama: Gilbert Langevin, Mon refuge est un volcan.
- Non-Fiction: François-Marc Gagnon, Paul-Emile Borduas : Biographie critique et analyse de l'oeuvre.
