= Alta-Sociedade =

Theatrical comedy by Miguel M. Abrahão

- Author: Miguel M. Abrahão
- Language: Brazilian Portuguese
- Genre: Comedy
- Publisher: Editora Shekinah (1982) and Editora Agbook (2009)
- Publication date: 1982 (play)
- Publication place: Brazil

Alta-Sociedade is a theatrical comedy in two acts, written by Brazilian dramatist Miguel M. Abrahão in 1978 and published first in 1982 in Brazil.

== Plot summary ==
Rich widow, Jandira Prates Gouveia de Morais, 87 years old, sacrifices her wealth by maintaining a romantic relationship with the “bon vivant” Lulu, 22 years old. Daughter Jussara Lílian and granddaughter Lílian Jussara vehemently oppose this exploitative relationship and end up being admitted to a psychiatric hospital on the elderly woman's orders. Years later, the two women, guided by lawyers and supported by a medical report, return to the mansion to demand their rights and, this time, willing to banish Jandira if necessary. The problem is that the treatment given by the hospital to two women with excellent mental health left Lílian Jussara and Jussara Lílian with sequelae and personality disorders. Their return to the Prates de Morais mansion will provoke radical twists that will involve the butler Alfred, the fashion designer Rangel and the enemy lawyers, identical triplet brothers, in a hilarious plot and surprising ending.

== Bibliography ==
- COUTINHO, Afrânio; SOUSA, J. Galante de. Enciclopédia de literatura brasileira. São Paulo: Global; Rio de Janeiro: Fundação Biblioteca Nacional, Academia Brasileira de Letras, 2001: 2v.
- Sociedade Brasileira de Autores Teatrais
- National Library of Brazil - Archives
