= A Pele do Ogro =

1996 novel by Miguel M. Abrahão

- Author: Miguel M. Abrahão
- Cover artist: Ilan Solot
- Language: Brazilian Portuguese
- Genre: historical novel and Magic realism
- Publisher: Editora Shekinah
- Publication date: 1996
- Publication place: Brazil
- Pages: 273

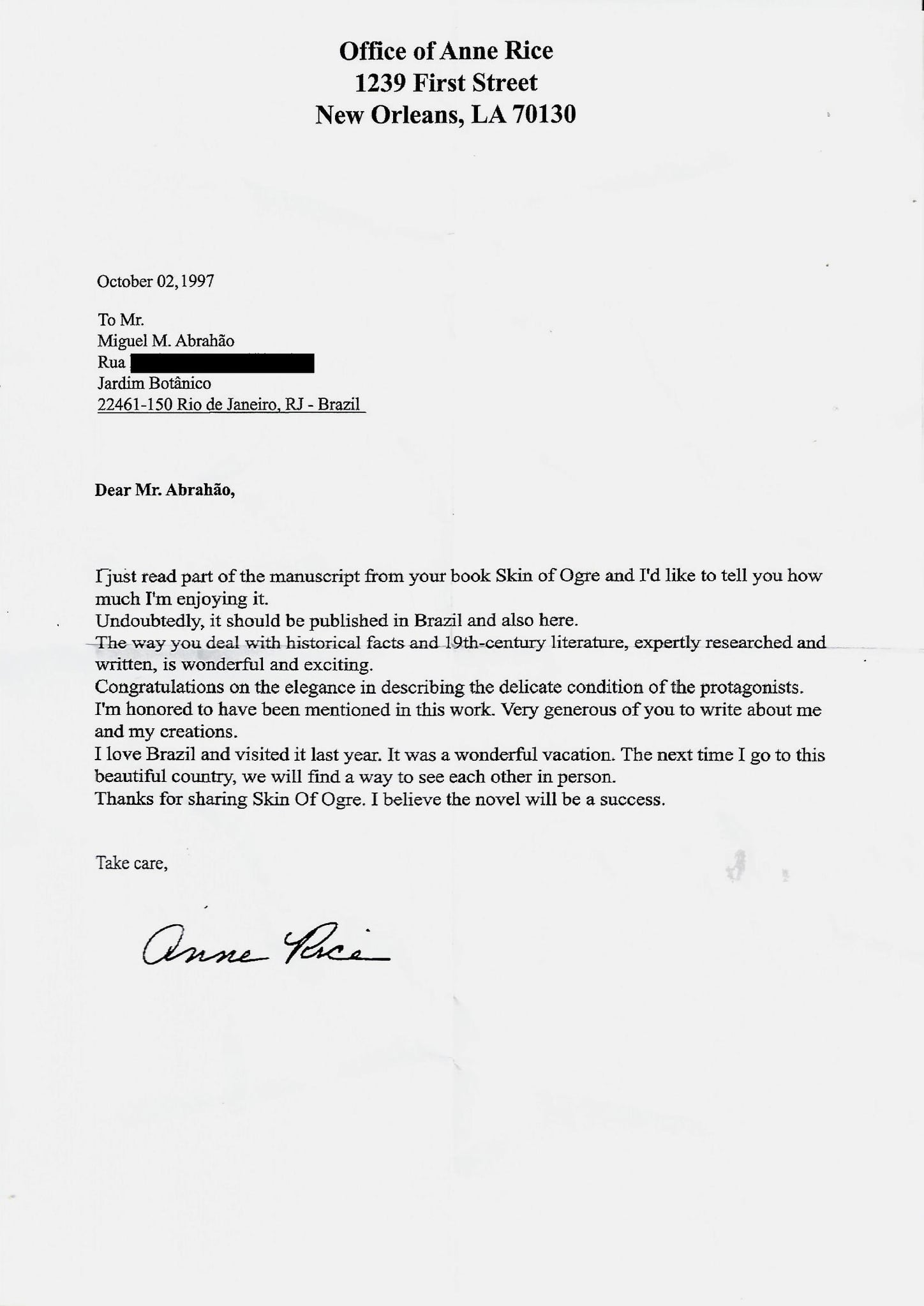
Correspondence with Anne Rice

A Pele do Ogro is a novel by Miguel M. Abrahão, published in 1996, in Brazil

== Plot summary ==
The story told by the novel A Pele do Ogro occurs in the cities of London, Rome, Moscow, Paris and Berlin, and as a basis for the plot, the story of 19th-century Europe.

The novel is divided into three parts and an epilogue. The first, located between 1848 and 1882, shows the first years of the existence of André Duroseille, desires, fears, love life and his obsession with immortality, beauty and youth.

Early in the novel, André meets Claire, a poor girl from Lyon, and falls in love with her. But the intense passion between the two, will be the target of the wrath of the mysterious Pierre Labatut, who lost a family member Duroseille and was determined not to lose another.

In the midst of an alleged attack of madness, Pierre puts the fire in the hut in which they live, killed his wife and stepdaughter, Claire, and disappears into the flames. André, accused of murder, he is immediately trapped in the chain of Lyon. In prison, he meets Gaston, who first told him of the existence of the mysterious Lydia, known as Romana:

"Lydia, female liberation! Lydia, my dear! Lydia, his wife immortal! I will glorify and pray for you ... Take me to the promised happiness. (...) Lydia is the master! The Ser ...! The woman who gives pleasure! Lydia, the woman who is a person without being! She has been with us since the dawn of humanity and will exist until the whole sky suffer the final break. Even taking the form of Lydia, a Roman she's all woman, and it is not ...! So it is a goddess"!

Leaving prison, arguing that Lydia can give you immortality, the young Duroseille, stubbornly, now married with a son, went to Italy. In his travels across the European continent, André established friendly relations with historical figures like Oscar Wilde, Bram Stoker, Queen Victoria and others, who talk about Lydia and their wealth, power, beauty and youth .

However, life does not smile for Duroseille: he finds his brother Henry, who has been missing for years, who hates him and is mortally ill and loses his wife and young son in the middle of an arson. But Lydia dominates his thoughts ...

The second part of the novel takes place between 1882 and 1894. During this period,

André has finally met Lydia. In the first meeting, she said: (...) You're the only man I've been searching for centuries ... But I had to wait until you have 35 years! My Antinous, my love (...)! A strong and passionate relationship between the two soon begin to suffer the stigma of suspicion. Lydia, after telling his origin, saying he was born in ancient Rome at the time of Emperor Hadrian, reveals that he was the reincarnation of Antinous, his only love! – And invites him to participate in the Palio of Siena, where a new tragedy lies ahead: the couple will be present at the suicide of Stefano, a young athlete who kills himself for love has the Lydia: If we do not the energy of these young people before, – a power that will allow us a long life and eternal youth – young people suffer a lot.

Lydia finally reveals the secret of the magic of the ancient Celts, and in the forests of Edinburgh, André became an immortal.

However, to keep him, he will remove the energy of someone who loves him deeply, which claimed the life of a young Italian couple. Andre feels the weight of guilt and is believed responsible for all the ills afflicting Europe in the late nineteenth century. And he is responsible! One by one of his closest friends will suffer the process of perjury and exile because of him.

The third part, between 1894 and 1900, shows André and Lydia involved in lawsuits and scandals that shook Europe in the late 19th century.

At this stage, the protagonist of the story, becomes a witness to the suffering of his best friends: Oscar Wilde is demoralized and imprisoned for the crime of sodomy, Alfred Dreyfus was convicted and exiled to Devil's Island, the writer Émile Zola died in suspicious circumstances and France, his homeland!, is ruled by corrupt politicians.

"Émile Zola murdered? But by whom? Lydia?"

In the home, André is in conflict with the stepdaughter, Paolo, mainly because of Lydia and political beliefs.

"Either you are separated from Lydia, or I do not ever want to see you"! – Paolo reproached him with great fury.

With the death of his stepson, daughter and grandson, André – convinced that Lidia was responsible for all the inequities – decides to destroy the only way possible to stop loving him. For him, there was no doubt in these cases: Lydia, the selfish Romana, wanted her for himself and for this reason, it has eliminated all those he truly loved.

The epilogue behind surprising revelation.

== Bibliography ==
- COUTINHO, Afrânio; SOUSA, J. Galante de. Enciclopédia de literatura brasileira. São Paulo: Global; Rio de Janeiro: Fundação Biblioteca Nacional, Academia Brasileira de Letras, 2001: 2v.
