= Roger Caron =

Canadian robber and writer (1938–2012)

- Born: Roger Caron; April 12, 1938; Cornwall, Ontario, Canada
- Died: April 11, 2012 (aged 73); Cornwall, Ontario, Canada
- Other name: Mad Dog
- Spouse: Barbara Prince (m. 1994)
- Parent(s): Donat and Yvonne
- Awards: Governor General’s Literary Award
- Conviction: Bank robbery

Roger "Mad Dog" Caron (April 12, 1938 – April 11, 2012) was a Canadian robber and the author of the influential prison memoir Go-Boy! Memories of a Life Behind Bars (1978). At the time of publishing, Caron was 39 years old and had spent 23 years in prison.

== Early life ==
Roger Caron was born in 1938, to extremely poor parents Donat and Yvonne in Cornwall, Ontario, Canada. During his first weeks of infancy Caron could not keep food down and was constantly gasping for breath, which subsequently led to him being rushed to the local hospital on several occasions. Though no definitive diagnosis was given for his breathlessness, Caron grew up "very edgy about anything affecting [his] breathing". He could not swim or hold his head under a shower for too long because of it. Caron was a quiet and secretive child who liked to keep to himself and pass the time by taking apart clocks.

His sister Suzanne was born in 1939; younger brother Gaston followed in 1944. Caron's father Donat, 20 years older than Yvonne, had children from a previous marriage, Caron's half-brothers and -sisters, who by this time were off fighting in World War II. The family lived in an old run-down converted barn that would vibrate when a nearby train passed, rattling dishes and moving beds while the family slept. Caron's mother, Yvonne, was compulsively clean and kept the antique furniture in the house shining.

Caron was "spooked" easily as a young child. With their house full of religious articles, and the dishes rattling and bed shaking caused by the train, Caron felt ghosts were haunting him. Up until the age of eight, he was plagued by horrifying nightmares that would leave him physically ill. He would imagine shadowy apparitions coming through the bars of his bed to choke him or large waves that would crash over him making it impossible to breathe. Later, a parish priest was able to help Caron fend off his nightmares. Caron told the priest he had accidentally broken the hand off a large Saint Joseph statue in his house while playing, thinking Saint Joseph's vengeful spirit was choking him in the night. The priest had him pray to the life-size Saint Joseph statue at the church where the Father explained to the saint that the boy was only young and did not know better. He gave Caron a silver medallion to wear around his neck and said Saint Joseph would be his protector from now on. Caron's nightmares disappeared and he continued to wear the medallion through adulthood.

During the final years of World War II, Caron's father found it difficult to feed the family and turned to bootlegging as a source for income. The sale of alcohol had been made legal in Ontario in 1927, but the law at the time required that bars and liquor stores close early, which made bootlegging profitable in Ontario for decades after 1927 as many people wanted to drink past the early closing time. In the beginning the Caron family bootlegging was a small-scale operation, but it soon grew to a level at which Donat would have to rent parking for his customers and find hiding places for the surplus booze. The family's house was raided numerous times by the local police until Caron's father struck a deal with a local officer who would warn them when a raid was coming, for 25 dollars a week. When a tip was phoned in, the family would rush outside and hide all the bottles in the empty field next to their house, leaving the police empty-handed. Donat would chuckle at having outwitted the law once again, all while young Caron sat by observing everything, wondering what was "right" and what was "wrong".

Around age eleven, Caron began having altercations with his father's drunken "customers". In one instance, a man killed Caron's pet rooster claiming it was an accident. Caron flew into a rage and had to be physically pulled off the man. Caron's father beat him severely. Beatings from his alcoholic father and fighting between his parents became more common as the bootlegging business continued to grow. Donat would later give up drinking and bootlegging after realizing the damage that was being done to the family.

Caron cites this as the time when he began feeling as if he were a bad seed. He felt a tremendous drive to do something shocking. People in the community would cast scorn on Caron but, not wanting them to see they were emotionally scarring him, he would laugh it off and run away and do something bad. When Caron got into trouble, his older stepbrothers would hold him down while his father mercilessly whipped him. The whippings had little effect on Caron, and he would find other ways to punish himself, like punching a shed door until his knuckles bled.

Caron's first brush with the law came at age twelve. He and a gang of youths broke into a boxcar with the intention of stealing canned goods. The police arrived, and Caron made a daring escape, darting between an arresting officer's legs. One of the other youths gave up Caron's name, and a motorcycle officer arrived at his school and arrested him in front of his class. The class waved goodbye as Caron rode away in the motorcycle's sidecar, remarking how he "felt like [John] Dillinger". At the court appearance, Caron was let off with probation and a stern lecture by the judge.

By age fourteen, Caron had become more of a loner and had a hair-trigger temper that would get him into trouble regularly. He would appear quiet and easygoing on the surface but would launch into a full-blown rage if pushed. At fifteen, Caron had built a lengthy arrest record topped off by stealing the town's cache of Dominion Day fireworks and three kegs of gunpowder with two other boys. At age sixteen, on September 8, 1954, Caron tripped the alarm at a sporting goods store. The police caught him after he hit his head on a beam in an alley and fell while escaping. On October 17, Caron was driven to the Ontario Reformatory in Guelph, with other future inmates on a bus dubbed the "Black Maria". His memoir Go-Boy! documents the next 23 years of his life.

Roger Caron's nephew, Jay Caron, son of Roger's brother Ray, was shot dead in the back by Cornwall Police. Jay's younger brother Raymond named his son after Jay. A common mistake is that Roger's son was shot. Roger is rumoured to have two children, a son born circa 1958 and a daughter circa 1960. Their identities are unknown.

== Works ==
=== Go-Boy! ===
Go-Boy! Memoirs Of A Life Behind Bars (1978) is Caron's first book detailing his life growing up in reformatories, prisons, and mental institutions from the age of sixteen through his thirties. Originally sent to the Ontario Reformatory in Guelph as a teenager, for breaking and entering, his "career" in prison grew exponentially after constant bad judgments and indulgences of a personal inner rage that Caron seemed unable to stifle.

While they were being marched from the recreation centre, Caron and a handful of inmates made a break for the woods at the fringes of the Brampton reformatory, amid fellow convicts' cries of "Go-Boy!" (a prison yell used when an inmate (or inmates) break from a work detail or crew in an attempt to escape). Caron successfully eluded the stalking prison guards and fled, not fully aware of how bleak his life would become over the following decades. He was recaptured three days later and sent back to the Ontario Reformatory in Guelph, this time as a member of the general population ("gen pop").

Caron successfully broke out of thirteen prisons and jails, more than any other criminal in Canadian history, exploits he covers in vivid detail throughout the book. Go-Boy! was awarded the 1978 Governor General's Award for non-fiction and was widely acknowledged for its insights into prison life. It sold more than 600,000 copies. The Canadian journalist Catherine Forgarty described Go-Boy! as a hallowing and graphic account of how Caron was from the age of 16 onward "...whipped, stabbed, clubbed, tear-gassed, raped and subjected to years in solitary confinement".

==== Corporal punishment ====
Go-Boy! covered in graphic detail how prisoners were subjected to corporal punishment by being whipped with paddles designed to inflict physical pain. Caron was paddled on two occasions within a short time when he was 17 years old with a 1/4-inch-thick (6.4 mm) leather paddle while strapped into a device he described as "a mass of metal tubing contoured to embrace a human form and, affixed to it, shackles and restraining straps".

==== Adaptations ====
In September 2004, Canadian film company Paradox Pictures secured the rights to Go-Boy! and began work on a screenplay. The following month, Paradox entered a pitch competition at the Raindance Film Festival. The film adaptation, eponymously titled Go-Boy!, was pitched to a panel of judges that included Neil Jordan and the producer from Bend It Like Beckham, and came in first runner up out of 29 other submissions.

=== Bingo! ===
Bingo! The Horrifying Eyewitness Account of a Prison Riot (1985), released seven years after publishing Go-Boy!, is Caron's account of the 1971 Kingston Penitentiary riot. Originally part of Go-Boy!, Caron pieced together outtakes from the memoir, including a lengthy section about the Kingston riot, to tell the tale as a separate story. The book narrates the most violent prison riot in Canadian history at one of the oldest prisons in the country, from the perspective of Caron, himself an inmate at Kingston during the riot. Bingo is Canadian prisoner slang for a prison riot. Caron wrote that the three toughest prisoners at Kingston penitentiary in 1971 were Barrie MacKenzie, Brian Beaucage and Wayne Ford who were all "natural leaders" who were "not to be fucked with" by the other prisoners.

In Bingo!, Caron emphatically denied the claims made by the media at the time that there was a massive number of homosexual gang rapes during the riot as he declared: "No rapes occurred during the riot. Any convict caught committing such an act would have been torn apart by the prison population in much the same fashion as an undesirable [prisoner slang for a child molester] would have been treated. Of course there was sex during the riot, but only among willing parties. If a blanket was hung over the door of a cell you didn't go in".

In Bingo!, Caron wrote the prison barber, Billy Knight, who started the riot lost control as the uprising continued. Caron described a power struggle between MacKenzie, who wanted to surrender to save lives after it was made clear that the Crown had rejected most of Knight's demands vs. Beaucage who wanted the uprising to end in a bloodbath. Caron wrote about Beaucage's demands that: "What was building up inside the dome was a mass suicide pact orchestrated by the insane element". Caron wrote it was the Solicitor-General, Jean-Pierre Goyer, who was responsible for Knight losing control after he gave a speech saying that the government would not negotiate with Knight, which the other inmates such as Beaucage were aware of by listening to their transistor radios. After the riot ended, the prisoners were sent to the new Millhaven Institution where the prisoners were all beaten by the guards in violation of the Crown's promises that the prisoners at Kingston penitentiary would not be beaten if they surrendered peacefully.

=== Jojo ===
Jojo (1988) was Caron's first attempt at writing fiction. In this novel, a half-breed Indian by the name of Lloyd Stonechild begins his life on a reserve in Western Manitoba and grows up to be strong, handsome, and ominously quiet. After one bad decision after another leads him to prison in Kansas he undertakes a harrowing and daring escape to Canada. Unlike Caron's first two books, Jojo was not well received by critics who panned its lack of character depth.

=== Dreamcaper ===
Dreamcaper (1992) was Caron's last novel, a story based on a 1976 armed robbery of a Brink's truck in Montreal, Quebec.

== Later life ==
Caron was paroled after the success of Go-Boy!. He eventually won a contract with Correctional Services Canada to give motivational talks to inmates and was considered a rehabilitation success. However, on April 1, 1992, Caron robbed a Zellers department store in Ottawa. High on cocaine and visibly shaking from the effects of Parkinson's disease, he tried to flee on a city bus only to be caught minutes later by police. Caron was denied bail and held until his trial in 1993. While awaiting trial, Caron tried to escape no less than three times. Initially sent to the Royal Ottawa Hospital to undergo a 30-day competency test, he tried to pry open the wire mesh covering a window and was immediately sent back to the Ottawa Detention Centre.

Later, Caron was sent to the Brockville Psychiatric Hospital for another attempt at a competency test. He again tried to escape through a window but was caught and placed in a padded cell. When orderlies came to administer Caron's Parkinson's medication, he fought with the staff and tried to make another break.

In autumn 1993, after a lengthy trial, Caron was sentenced to nearly eight years for the Zellers robbery. An extra nine months were added to the sentence because of the previous year's escape attempts, and a further nine months were added for an attempted escape at Gatineau Maximum Security Detention Centre in Hull, Quebec from over a decade earlier, bringing Caron's total sentence to nine years and three months. On July 15, 1994, while imprisoned at the Joyceville Institution, Caron married Barbara Prince, a legal secretary from Ottawa he had been dating prior to his latest incarceration. He also suffered two heart attacks and underwent open heart surgery on December 2, 1998 to have a triple bypass performed. Caron was paroled on December 10, 1998, partially due to his health, and moved to Barry's Bay, Ontario to be closer to his new wife's family. His parole was to last until 2003.

On October 12, 2001, police, acting on an anonymous phone tip, arrested Caron at the Rideau Centre in downtown Ottawa for allegedly carrying a loaded revolver, wig, scarf, several hats, and change of clothes. In February 2004, he was sentenced to 20 months in prison for being in possession of a loaded .32-calibre semi-automatic pistol at the Ottawa mall, which was a violation of his parole. While in prison for the parole violation, Caron was charged with fifteen more robberies that occurred in Toronto during the summer of 2001. Fourteen banks and one grocery store were robbed. Witnesses thought the robber was over six feet tall and in his thirties. Caron stands five foot eight inches tall and would have been 63 years old in 2001. The number of robberies was reduced from fifteen to five and on March 3, 2005 Caron was found not guilty on all charges.

At 67 years old, Caron was released from Maplehurst Correctional Complex in April 2005 and had been living as a free man in Barry's Bay with his wife, Barbara. He subsequently lived alone in a retirement home in Plantagenet, Ontario. He suffered from dementia and Parkinson's disease.

== Death ==
Caron died on April 11, 2012, one day before his 74th birthday, at the Sandfield Place Nursing Home in Cornwall, Ontario.

== Awards ==
- 1978 Governor General's Award (English non-fiction) for Go-Boy! Memories of a Life Behind Bars

== Bibliography ==
- 1978 Go-Boy! Memories of a Life Behind Bars (first edition), McGraw-Hill Ryerson, 264 pages, ISBN 978-0070825352
- 1985 Bingo! The Horrifying Eyewitness Account of a Prison Riot, Methuen, 216 pages, ISBN 0-458-99700-5
- 1988 Jojo, Stoddart Publishing, 180 pages, ISBN 0-7737-2208-4
- 1992 Dreamcaper, Stoddart Publishing, 215 pages, ISBN 0-7737-5486-5

== See also ==
- Prison reform
- Stephen Reid
