= Stara Zhadova =

Village in Chernivtsi Oblast, Ukraine

Stara Zhadova Стара Жадова
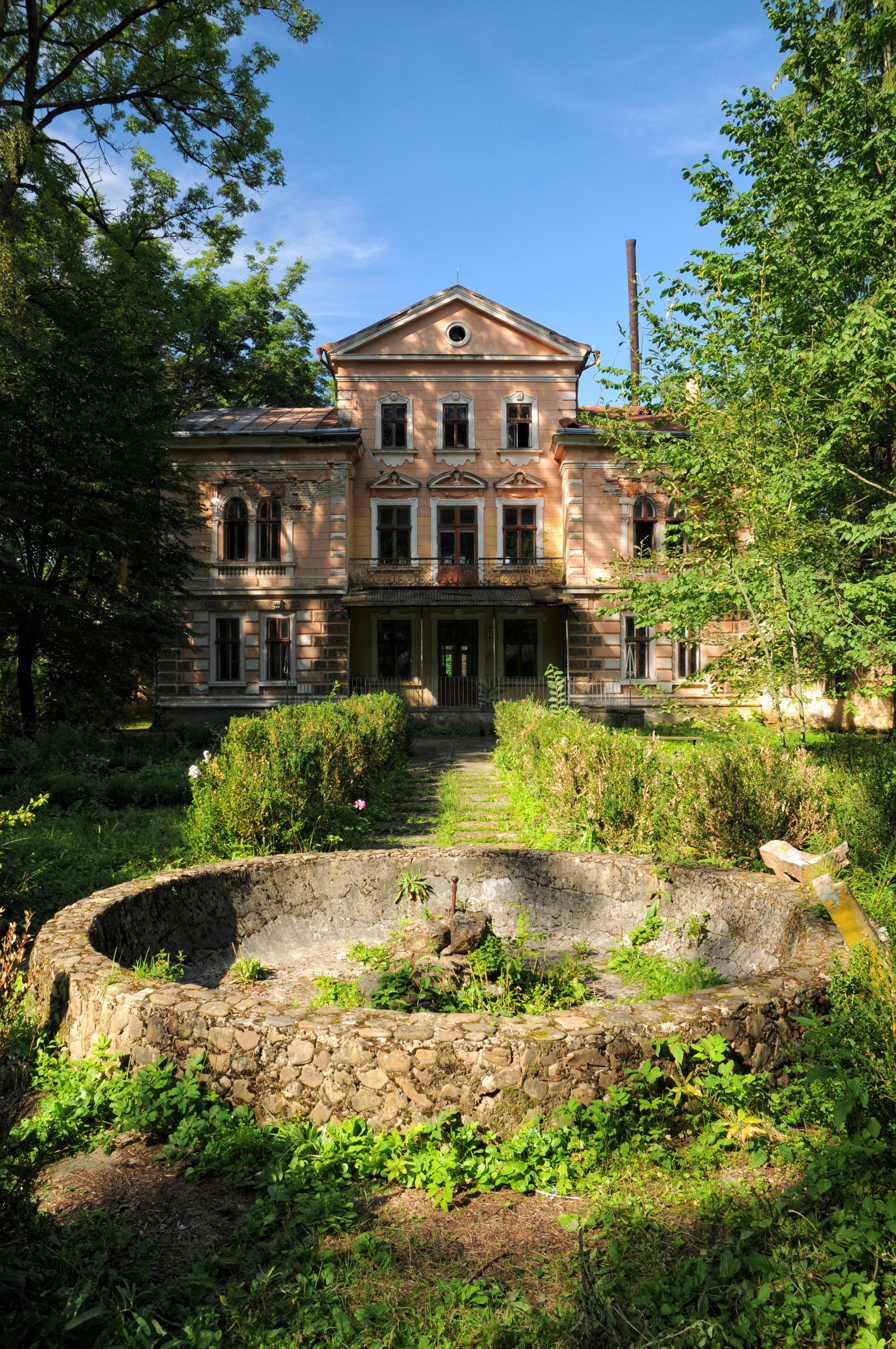
- Starozhadivsky manor park (now a children's sanatorium)
- Interactive map of Stara Zhadova
- Location in Chernivtsi Oblast Location in Ukraine
- Coordinates: 48°12′49″N 25°30′49.38″E
- Country: Ukraine
- Oblast: Chernivtsi Oblast
- Raion: Chernivtsi Raion
- Hromada: Storozhynets urban hromada
- Elevation: 397 m (1,302 ft)

Population (2011)
  - Total: 2,392
- Time zone: UTC+2 (EET)
  - Summer (DST): UTC+3 (EEST)
- Postal code: 59017
- Area code: +380 3735
- KOATUU: 7324589501

Stara Zhadova (Ukrainian: Стара Жадова; Romanian: Jadova or Jadova Veche; Yiddish: זשאַדעווע, romanized: Zhadeve) is a village in Chernivtsi Raion, Chernivtsi Oblast, Ukraine. It belongs to Storozhynets urban hromada, one of the hromadas of Ukraine.

Until 18 July 2020, Stara Zhadova belonged to Storozhynets Raion. The raion was abolished in July 2020 as part of the administrative reform of Ukraine, which reduced the number of raions of Chernivtsi Oblast to three. The area of Storozhynets Raion was merged into Chernivtsi Raion.

Stara Zhadova is the birthplace of the writer Aharon Appelfeld.
