= O Dinheiro =

Theatrical comedy by Miguel M. Abrahão

- Author: Miguel M. Abrahão
- Language: Brazilian Portuguese
- Genre: Comedy
- Publisher: Editora Shekinah (1983) and Editora Agbook (2009)
- Publication date: 1983 (play)
- Publication place: Brazil

O Dinheiro is a theatrical comedy in two acts, written by Brazilian dramatist Miguel M. Abrahão in 1976 and published first in 1983 in Brazil.

== Plot summary ==
O Dinheiro, written in 1976 and revised by the author in other opportunities, is the best-known work of dramaturgy by Miguel M. Abrahão. Combining fakeness, comedy and detective's elements, this story is about a family that is made prisoner in an isolated mansion for twelve years, just to receive uncle Josafa Paranhos I's inheritance, following the rules of a really creepy will.

Each character presents a pathological deviation, all linked to the habit of collecting something (syringes, boards, men, spiders), or fixed ideas (such as ET or famous characters in American films). At the end of the twelve years, advocates of Josafá require that hosts in the mansion, a young man intern: Alexandre Pousa. And, coincidentally with his arrival, apparently accidental deaths begin to occur at the mansion, leaving the question in the air: murders or fatalities?

== Bibliography ==
- COUTINHO, Afrânio; SOUSA, J. Galante de. Enciclopédia de literatura brasileira. São Paulo: Global; Rio de Janeiro: Fundação Biblioteca Nacional, Academia Brasileira de Letras, 2001: 2v.
- Sociedade Brasileira de Autores Teatrais
- National Library of Brazil - Archives
