= Wayne Ford =

Wayne Ford may refer to:

- Wayne Ford (politician) (born 1951), member of the Iowa House of Representatives
- Wayne Adam Ford (born 1961), American serial killer
- Wayne Ford (criminal) (born 1946), Canadian murderer
