= Marshall Jevons =

American novelist

Marshall Jevons is a fictitious crime writer invented and used by William L. Breit and Kenneth G. Elzinga, professors of economics at Trinity University, San Antonio, and the University of Virginia, respectively.

It was Breit's notion to write a mystery novel in which an amateur detective uses economic theory to solve crimes. Elzinga was enthusiastic about his colleague's idea and not only encouraged him to proceed but also decided to take an active role in writing the book. Over the next twenty years, on top of their academic schedules, Breit and Elzinga co-wrote four mystery books featuring Harvard economist-sleuth Henry Spearman. The first Henry Spearman Mystery, Murder at the Margin, came out in 1978, and was followed by The Fatal Equilibrium (1985), A Deadly Indifference (1995) and The Mystery of the Invisible Hand (2014).

When, in 1978, after a three-year collaboration, the two economists' first foray into crime fiction was eventually published by Thomas Horton and Daughters, there was no indication on the book cover as to the true identity of the authors. Rather, Elzinga had concocted a fanciful biography of Marshall Jevons, which read:

Marshall Jevons is the President of UtilMax, Inc., an international consulting firm headquartered in New York City. A former Rhodes Scholar, he holds advanced degrees in economics, biochemistry, and oceanography. Mr. Jevons is an Olympic medal holder in kayaking whose hobbies now include rocketry and the futures market in cocoa beans. He is a native of Virginia but prefers to call 'home' the Queen Elizabeth 2. This is Marshall Jevons' first novel.

However, in subsequent editions of the book, Breit and Elzinga's authorship was recognized. Murder at the Margin has since been used as supplementary reading in many introductory courses in economics. In commercial terms, the novel was a success, and MIT Press approached the authors to suggest they write another Henry Spearman Mystery which they would publish. Thus, in 1985, The Fatal Equilibrium became the first mystery novel to be published by a university press. One year later, a mass market paperback was issued, prompting Marshall Jevons to comment that “there are few pleasures more satisfying than seeing one's own paperback in a book rack at an airport newsstand”.

The name Marshall Jevons derives from the surnames of two 19th-century English economists, Alfred Marshall and William Stanley Jevons.

A blog about economics called "The Bayesian Heresy" has also adopted the pseudonym.
