= Aharon Appelfeld =

Israeli novelist and Holocaust survivor (1932–2018)

- אהרן אפלפלד
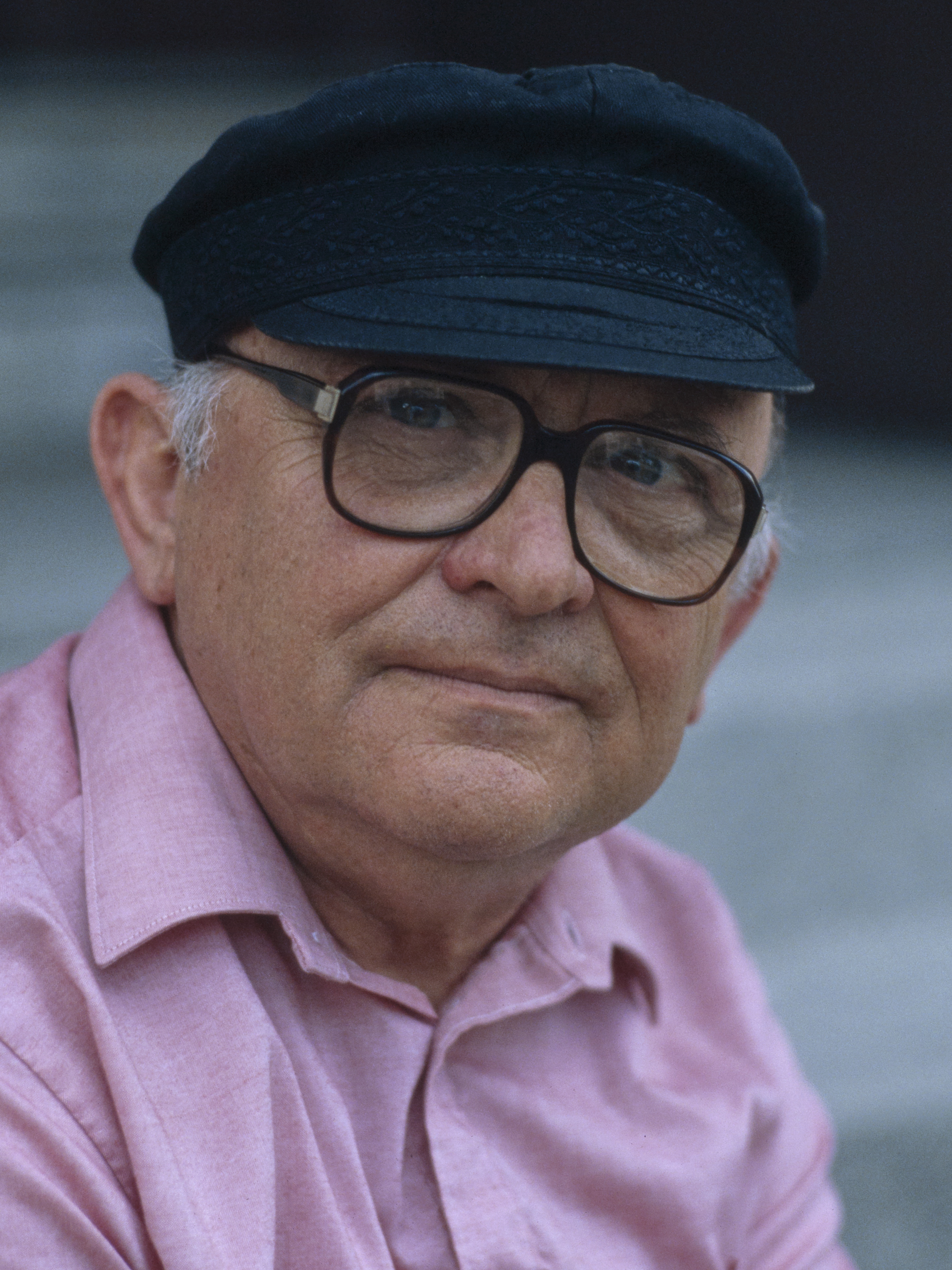
- Born: February 16, 1932; Jadova, Kingdom of Romania (now Ukraine)
- Died: January 4, 2018 (aged 85); Petah Tikva, near Tel Aviv, Israel
- Citizenship: Israeli
- Education: The Hebrew University of Jerusalem
- Occupation: Novelist
- Writing career
- Language: Hebrew
- Notable awards: Bialik Prize; Israel Prize; National Jewish Book Award; Foreign Honorary Member of the American Academy of Arts and Sciences; Prix Médicis; Nelly Sachs Prize

Aharon Appelfeld (Hebrew: אהרן אפלפלד; born Ervin Appelfeld; February 16, 1932 – January 4, 2018) was an Israeli novelist and Holocaust survivor.

== Biography ==
Ervin (Aharon) Appelfeld was born in Jadova Commune, Storojineț County, in the Bukovina region of the Kingdom of Romania, now Ukraine. In an interview with the literary scholar, Nili Gold, in 2011, he remembered his home town in this district, Czernowitz, as "a very beautiful" place, full of schools and with two Latin gymnasiums, where fifty to sixty percent of the population was Jewish. In 1941, when he was nine years old, the Romanian Army retook his hometown after a year of Soviet occupation and his mother was murdered. Appelfeld was deported with his father to a forced labor camp in Romanian-controlled Transnistria. He escaped and hid for three years before joining the Soviet army as a cook. After World War II, Appelfeld spent several months in a displaced persons camp in Italy before immigrating to Palestine in 1946, two years before Israel's independence. He was reunited with his father after finding his name on a Jewish Agency list in 1960. (Both Appelfeld and his father had presumed the other had been murdered in the Holocaust. They had both made their way separately to Israel after the war.) The father had been sent to a ma'abara (refugee camp) in Be'er Tuvia. The reunion was so emotional that Appelfeld had never been able to write about it.

In Israel, Appelfeld made up for his lack of formal schooling and learned Hebrew, the language in which he began to write. His first literary efforts were short stories, but gradually he progressed to novels. He completed his studies at the Hebrew University of Jerusalem. He lived in Mevaseret Zion and taught literature at Ben Gurion University of the Negev and was often writing in Jerusalem's Ticho House (Beit Ticho).

In 2007, Appelfeld's Badenheim 1939 was adapted for the stage by Arnold Wesker and performed at the Gerard Behar Center in Jerusalem.

== Choice of language ==
Appelfeld was one of Israel's foremost living Hebrew-language authors, despite the fact that he did not learn the language until he was a teenager. His mother tongue was German, but he was also proficient in Yiddish, Ukrainian, Romanian, Russian, English, and Italian. With his subject matter revolving around the Holocaust and the sufferings of the Jews in Europe, he could not bring himself to write in German. He chose Hebrew as his literary vehicle for its succinctness and biblical imagery.

Appelfeld purchased his first Hebrew book at the age of 25: King of Flesh and Blood by Moshe Shamir. In an interview with the newspaper Haaretz, he said he agonized over it, because it was written in Mishnaic Hebrew and he had to look up every word in the dictionary.

In an interview in the Boston Review, Appelfeld explained his choice of Hebrew: "I’m lucky that I’m writing in Hebrew. Hebrew is a very precise language, you have to be very precise—no over-saying. This is because of our Bible tradition. In the Bible tradition you have very small sentences, very concise and autonomic. Every sentence, in itself, has to have its own meaning."

== The Holocaust as a literary theme ==
Many Holocaust survivors have written an autobiographical account of their survival, but Appelfeld did not offer a realistic depiction of the events. He wrote short stories that can be interpreted in a metaphoric way. Instead of his personal experience, he sometimes evoked the Holocaust without even relating to it directly. His style is clear and precise, but also very modernistic.

Appelfeld resided in Israel but wrote little about life there. Most of his work focuses on Jewish life in Europe before, during and after World War II. As an orphan from a young age, the search for a mother figure is central to his work. During the Holocaust he was separated from his father, and only met him again 20 years later.

== Motifs ==
Silence, muteness and stuttering are motifs that run through much of Appelfeld's work. Disability becomes a source of strength and power. Philip Roth described Appelfeld as "a displaced writer of displaced fiction, who has made of displacement and disorientation a subject uniquely his own."

== Awards and honors ==
- 1975 Brenner Prize for literature.
- 1979 Bialik Prize for literature (jointly with Avot Yeshurun).
- 1983 Israel Prize for literature.
- 1989 National Jewish Book Award for Fiction for Badenheim 1939 (ISBN 0-87923-799-6 ),
- 1989 National Jewish Book Award for Fiction for The Immortal Bartfuss
- 1997 Foreign Honorary Member of the American Academy of Arts and Sciences.
- 1998 National Jewish Book Award for Fiction for The Iron Tracks
- 2004 Prix Médicis (foreign works category) for his autobiography, The Story of a Life: A Memoir (2003, ISBN 0-8052-4178-7)
- 2011 National Jewish Book Award for Fiction for Until the Dawn’s Light
- 2012 Independent Foreign Fiction Prize for Blooms of Darkness: at the time, Appelfeld was the oldest ever recipient of the prize
- 2016 Sydney Taylor Book Award for the children's book "Adam and Thomas"

== Cultural references ==
Appelfeld's work was greatly admired by his friend, fellow Jewish novelist Philip Roth, who made the Israeli writer a character in his own novel Operation Shylock.

== Published works ==
- Badenheim 1939 (1978, English translation: 1980)
- The Age of Wonders (1978, tr. 1981)
- Tzili (1982, tr. 1983)
- The Retreat (tr. 1984)
- To the Land of the Cattails (tr. 1986) (earlier published as To the Land of the Reeds)
- The Immortal Bartfuss (1988)
- For Every Sin (tr. 1989)
- The Healer (tr. 1990)
- Katerina (1989, tr. 1992)
- Iron Tracks (1991, tr. 1998)
- Unto the Soul (tr. 1993)
- The Conversion (1991, tr. 1998)
- Laish (2001, tr. 2009)
- Beyond Despair: Three Lectures and a Conversation With Philip Roth (tr. 2003)
- The Story of a Life: A Memoir (2003)
- A Table For One: Under The Light Of Jerusalem (tr. 2005)
- All Whom I Have Loved (tr. 2007)
- Blooms of Darkness (2006, tr. 2010)
- Until the Dawn’s Light (1995, tr. 2011)
- Yalda Shelo Minhaolam Hazé = A girl from another world (fiction for children) (2013, not yet tr. in English), (published in French, Italian, 2014)
- Suddenly Love (tr. 2014)
- Long Summer Nights (2015)
- Adam and Thomas (fiction for children) (2015)
- The Man Who Never Stopped Sleeping (2017)
- To the Edge of Sorrow (2012, tr. 2020)

== See also ==
- Hebrew literature
- List of Bialik Prize recipients
- List of Israel Prize recipients

== Additional sources ==
- Rudin, Shai. "'Much Delusion that is in Good Will'": Aharon Appelfeld's Ambivalent Position on Zionism—In His Non-Fiction and in His Fiction." Hebrew Studies 50, no. 1 (2009): 305-338.
