= Charlotte Chandler =

American biographer and playwright

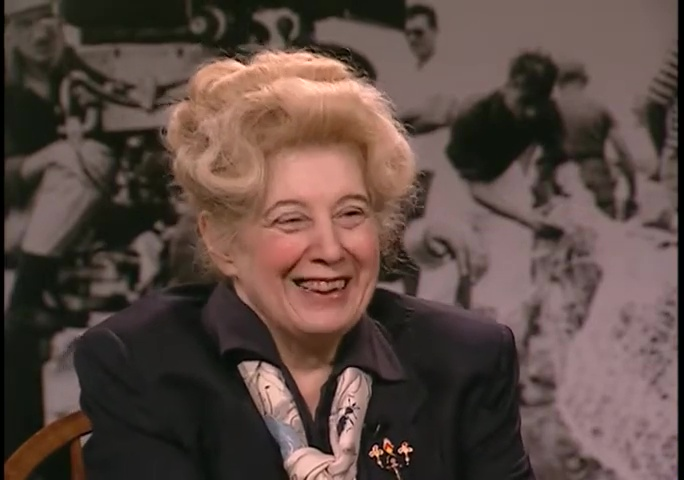
Chandler on CUNY TV's City Cinematheque, 2005

Lyn Erhard, better known under the pen name of Charlotte Chandler, is an American biographer and playwright. Chandler authored biographies of Groucho Marx, Federico Fellini, Billy Wilder, Bette Davis, Marlene Dietrich, Joan Crawford, Ingrid Bergman, Mae West and Alfred Hitchcock.

A resident of New York City, Chandler is a member of the board of Film at Lincoln Center.

== Selected works ==
- (1978). Hello, I Must Be Going: Groucho and His Friends. Garden City, NY: Doubleday. 1978. ISBN 0-385-12444-9.
- (1984). The Ultimate Seduction. Garden City, NY: Doubleday. 1984. ISBN 0-385-18953-2.
- (1986). Confessions of a Nightingale, a one-person play that utilizes parts of her biography on Tennessee Williams's The Ultimate Seduction.
- (1995). I, Fellini. New York: Random House. 1995. ISBN 0-679-44032-1.
- (2002). Nobody's Perfect: Billy Wilder, A Personal Biography. New York: Simon & Schuster. 2002. ISBN 0-7432-1709-8.
- (2005). It's Only A Movie: Alfred Hitchcock, A Personal Biography. New York: Simon & Schuster. 22 February 2005. ISBN 0-7432-4508-3.
- (2006) The Girl Who Walked Home Alone: Bette Davis, A Personal Biography: New York; Simon & Schuster.
- (2007). Ingrid: Ingrid Bergman, A Personal Biography. New York: Simon & Schuster. 20 February 2007. ISBN 978-0-7432-9421-8.
- (2008). Not the Girl Next Door: Joan Crawford, A Personal Biography. New York: Simon & Schuster. 2008. ISBN 978-1-4165-4751-8.
- (2011). Marlene: Marlene Dietrich, A Personal Biography. New York: Simon & Schuster. 2011. ISBN 978-1-4391-8835-4.
