= Mary Elizabeth Counselman =

American novelist

- Born: November 19, 1911; Birmingham, Alabama, US
- Died: November 13, 1995 (aged 83)
- Occupations: Short story writer, poet
- Writing career
- Pen name: Charles Dubois, Sanders McCrorey, John Starr
- Genres: Horror, fantasy

Mary Elizabeth Counselman (November 19, 1911 – November 13, 1995) was an American writer of short stories and poetry.

== Biography ==
Mary Elizabeth Counselman was born on November 19, 1911, in Birmingham, Alabama. She began writing poetry as a child and sold her first poem at the age of six. She later moved to Gainesville, Georgia, where her father was a faculty member at the Riverside Military Academy. She attended the University of Alabama and Alabama College (now Montevallo University).

Her first sale was to "an awful little magazine called Mind Magic." Presumably, this was the short story, "The Devil Himself," which ran in the November 1931 issue of My Self, the first issue of the retitled Mind Magic.

Counselman's work appeared in Weird Tales, Collier's, The Saturday Evening Post, Good Housekeeping, Ladies' Home Journal, and other magazines. Her stories were dramatized on General Electric Theater and other national television programs in the US, Canada, the British Isles, and Australia.

Counselman began writing weird fiction for the pulp magazines in the 1930s. Her tale "The Three Marked Pennies", written while she was in her teens, and published in Weird Tales in 1934, was one of the three most popular in all of Weird Tales history. Readers mentioned it in letters for years after its publication.

Another story, "Seventh Sister" published in Weird Tales in January 1943, is a rare example of a voodoo story written by a woman.

In describing her philosophy of writing horror fiction, she said, "The Hallowe'en scariness of the bumbling but kindly Wizard of Oz has always appealed to me more than the gruesome, morbid fiction of H. P. Lovecraft, Clark Ashton Smith, and those later authors who were influenced by their doom philosophies. My eerie shades bubble with an irrepressible sense of humour, ready to laugh with (never at) those earth-bound mortals whose fears they once shared."

Later, Counselman worked as a reporter for The Birmingham News. Counselman taught creative writing classes at Gadsden State Junior College (now the Wallace Drive Campus of Gadsden State Community College) and at the University of Alabama.

She completed a novel about witchcraft, and in 1976 received a $6,000 National Endowment for the Arts grant.

The late August Derleth anthologised her poems in Dark of the Moon: Poems of Fantasy and the Macabre and Fire and Sleet and Candlelight.

For most of her life she resided on a houseboat in Gadsden, Alabama, with her husband, Horace B. Vinyard, whom she married in 1941, and a large entourage of cats.

== Books ==
- Half in Shadow: A Collection of Tales for the Night Hours (short stories) (UK edition, Consul paperback/World Distributors, 1964; contains 14 tales, 6 not in the later US edition; Arkham House edition, 1978; contains 14 tales, 6 not in the earlier UK edition). Reprint: London: William Kimber, 1980.
- African Yesterdays: A Collection of Native Folktales. Centre, Ala.: Coosa Printing Co., 1975 (enlarged ed 1977)
- Move Over – It's Only Me (verse) (1975)
- Everything You Always Wanted to Know About the Supernatural – But Are Afraid to Believe (1976)
- SPQR: The Poetry and Life of Catullus (1977)
- The Eye and the hand (verse) (1977)
- New Lamps for Old (1978)
- The Face of Fear and Other Poems (Pensacola, FL: Eidolon Press, 1984), compiled by Steve Eng, introduction by Joseph Payne Brennan
- Masters of Horror, Vol. Three: Mary Elizabeth Counselman—Hostess of Horror & Fantasy (2022)
- The Devil's Lottery: The Weird Stories of Mary Elizabeth Counselman (Screaming Eye Press), edited by Eve Taft (2022)

== Articles ==
- "The Ideal Place to Write," The Author & Journalist, April 1949, pp. 5–7.

== Awards ==
Counselman received the 1981 Phoenix Award from the Southern Fandom Confederation.

== Adaptations ==
The short story "Parasite Mansion", first published in the January 1942 issue of Weird Tales was adapted into an episode of the Thriller television anthology series, broadcast April 25, 1961. The episode is described as of above-average quality but undermined by its "blithe acceptance of the supernatural". It is, however, considered stronger than Counselman's original work.
