= A Escola =

1983 novel by Miguel M. Abrahão

- Author: Miguel M. Abrahão
- Language: Brazilian Portuguese
- Genre: historical novel
- Publisher: Editora Shekinah (1983), Editora Espaço Jurídico(2007), 'Editora Vieira e Lent (2011)
- Publication date: 1983 (historical play) and 2007 (historical novel)
- Publication place: Brazil
- Pages: 315
- ISBN: 978-85-88782-81-5

A Escola is a Portuguese-language novel by Miguel M. Abrahão. It was first published in Brazil in 1983.

== Plot summary ==
The book has as background the 30s, during the dictatorship of the Vargas government.

Master Bolivar Bueno, involved with dangerous ideas for the season, has a strong influence and emotional control over their traditional primary school students from Wolfgang Schubert, while dividing her love life with the teachers of the school, ideologically and being chased by the director, the Rev. Otto Faukner, and his assistant, miss Catarina.

In 2005, the play was adapted by its author to the format of the novel, released in 2007. In this new format, the author expands historical themes, importants for the knowledge of Brazilian History of the 30s: Revolution to São Paulo in 1932, fascism and communism in Brazil, ruled by Getúlio Vargas.

== Bibliography ==
- Coutinho, Afrânio; Sousa, J. Galante de. Enciclopédia de literatura brasileira. São Paulo: Global; Rio de Janeiro: Fundação Biblioteca Nacional, Academia Brasileira de Letras, 2001: 2v.
- Sociedade Brasileira de Autores Teatrais - Processo 36030 de 19 October 1983
