= Pássaro da Manhã =

Play and book by Miguel M. Abrahão

- Author: Miguel M. Abrahão
- Language: Brazilian Portuguese
- Genre: Drama
- Publisher: Editora Agbook (2009)
- Publication date: 1978
- Publication place: Brazil

Pássaro da Manhã is a theatrical one-act drama, written by Miguel M. Abrahão in 1978 and staged several times in Brazil. It was published in book form in 2009.

== Plot summary ==
Pássaro da Manhã shows the trajectory of Tuca and Tom, two teenagers somewhere in the universe who philosophize about life, at the same time that, desperately, seek an identity and a hope for mankind in order to save her from a sad condition.

This is a dramatic text which brings us the poetry and lyricism of a time lost.

In 1984, João Vitti won the award for Best Actor at the Salesian Theatre Festival (São Paulo) with TOM character.

== Bibliography ==
- COUTINHO, Afrânio; SOUSA, J. Galante de. Enciclopédia de literatura brasileira. São Paulo: Global; Rio de Janeiro: Fundação Biblioteca Nacional, Academia Brasileira de Letras, 2001: 2v.
- National Library of Brazil - Archives
- Sociedade Brasileira de Autores Teatrais
