= A Casa (play) =

Comedy play by Miguel M. Abrahão

- Author: Miguel M. Abrahão
- Language: Brazilian Portuguese
- Genre: Comedy
- Publisher: Editora Shekinah (1983) and Editora Agbook (2009)
- Publication date: 1983 (play)
- Publication place: Brazil

A Casa is a theatrical comedy in two acts, written by Miguel M. Abrahão in 1978 and published first in 1983 in Brazil.

== Plot summary ==
A Casa tells a simple story, with a narrative featuring passion of the characters. The theme of the play revolves around the seemingly bitter and cynical idea: a woman should become a prostitute, to sustain herself without effort. Josinalda, a lady of strict principles, maintains in her house with meager salary Liduina, her sister, Fredegund, her niece, and Creuzilene, her neighbor. Their life is peaceful and marked by seemingly common issues until, unexpectedly, a bandit enters the residence of distinguished ladies, making them hostages. The play then becomes a police comedy, and an intellectual game of cat and mouse.

== Bibliography ==
- Sociedade Brasileira de Autores Teatrais
- National Library of Brazil - Archives
