= The Exeter Blitz =

1978 children's historical novel by David Rees

- Front cover of first edition
- Author: David Rees
- Cover artist: Laszlo Acs
- Language: English
- Genre: Children's historical novel, war novel
- Publisher: Hamish Hamilton
- Publication date: 1978
- Publication place: United Kingdom
- Media type: Print (hardcover)
- Pages: 116 pp (first edition)
- ISBN: 0241897599
- OCLC: 476503406
- LC Class: PZ7.R25468 Ex

The Exeter Blitz is a children's historical novel by David Rees, published by Hamilton in 1978. Set in the southwestern England city of Exeter, partly at Exeter Cathedral, it features the heavy May 1942 air raid and its effect on the life of one family, the Lockwoods.

Rees won the annual Carnegie Medal recognising the year's best children's book by a British subject.

Elsevier published the first US edition in 1980.

== Plot summary ==
The novel opens in Colin Lockwood's school during a history lesson, the night after an air raid. Colin has fallen asleep, provoking sarcasm from the teacher, Mr Kitchen. At home, Colin irritates his mother and older sister Mary, and so decides to go to see his father, who is working at Exeter Cathedral.

At the cathedral Colin notes down an inscription carved by one of his ancestors, for his history homework. As Mr Lockwood has to check on the fire-fighting arrangements, Colin climbs to the top of the south tower for the first time, and is impressed by the extensive view of the city. He accidentally leaves his jacket up there, with his homework in the pocket.

When Colin gets home, his mother recruits him to hand out sherry and snacks at the fashion show in Nimrod's that evening. Colin finds he quite enjoys his duties, and he is surprised when Mr Kitchen and his wife join the party. He gets a fit of giggles when he listens to the speaker, Mrs Wimbleball, describing the new collection in glowing terms, and is sent out by his mother. He decides to retrieve his jacket from the cathedral tower, and climbs to the roof.

At this point the sirens start, and the planes arrive unusually soon afterwards. Colin sees the bombing start and is thrilled and fascinated until he realises his danger. During a lull in the bombardment, he runs down the steps to an air raid shelter. On the way he narrowly escapes being hit by machine-gun fire.

Mr Lockwood and his younger daughter June are at home where they shelter under the stairs. A bomb falls on the house, destroying half of it. When the all-clear sounds they are able to crawl through the rubble to the street.

At Nimrod's, some people are trapped in the lift when the power station is hit. When a bomb hits the shop, Mrs Lockwood is injured, Mrs Wimbleball is paralysed and the Kitchens are killed outright.

Mary and her boyfriend Lars are at the cinema, and leave immediately for the nearest shelter. Mary, a nurse, badly wants to get to the hospital, but Lars makes her wait until the all clear sounds. Later at the hospital, Mary sees her mother brought in unconscious.

Colin meets his Cockney schoolmate Terry at the shelter, and although they have been at odds before, the common experience brings them closer. As their fish shop has been destroyed, Colin invites Terry back to his house to sleep, not knowing it has also been bombed. Instead, they camp out in the fields.

The next day, it is clear that despite devastating damage to the city centre, the cathedral has been largely spared, raising morale.

Colin and Terry decide to use some of the no-longer frozen fish from the shop to provide free food for their neighbours. They cook all day and win praise for their efforts. It is the beginning of a new phase of life for Colin, more independent and adult.

The other family members do not fare so well, although they find a new home. Mr Lockwood is overwhelmed at work, Mrs Lockwood recovers, but misses her home, Mary is depressed and haunted by the injuries she has seen, and June mourns for all her beloved books and toys.

== Characters ==
- Colin Lockwood, a 14-year-old Devon schoolboy
- June Lockwood, his younger sister, still at junior school
- Mary Lockwood, his older sister, a student nurse
- Brenda Lockwood, their mother, the assistant manageress at Nimrod's, an expensive dress shop
- Ron Lockwood, their father, a verger at the cathedral
- Terry Wootton, Colin's classmate, one of the London evacuees
- Mrs Wootton, Terry's mother, who runs a fish shop in Exeter since her shop in London was bombed
- Mr Kitchen, a history teacher recalled from retirement due to the war
- Pam Foster, June's best friend
- Mr and Mrs Foster, Pam's parents
- Lars, Mary's boyfriend, a ballet-dancer who has just been called up
- Lorna Wimbleball, a visitor from Nimrod's head office in Kensington

== Allusions to actual history ==
As the author explains in the Introduction, the novel is not intended to be an exact reconstruction of the air raid: most notably, there was no raid on the previous night (the earlier, less damaging raids having taken place in late April), and the actual raid started at around 1am on 4 May rather than in the late evening of 3 May. The change in time is for dramatic effect, allowing the family to be believably scattered around the city. However, the other details of the raid, such as the machine-gunning, and the extent of the devastation are accurately portrayed.

The Introduction provides the historical background, the RAF raid on the ancient German port of Lübeck which prompted the retaliatory Baedecker raids on places of historical and architectural importance. It outlines the main architectural losses, considers the mystery of the survival of the cathedral, and notes that the city returned to a semblance of normality with surprising speed.

== Allusions to other works ==
On the dedication page, there is a quotation from Exeter Phoenix by Thomas Sharp, the town planner who redesigned Exeter.

Children's books by the popular writers Enid Blyton and Arthur Ransome are mentioned as having been lost in the raid.

== See also ==
Awards
Preceded by The Turbulent Term of Tyke Tiler	Carnegie Medal recipient 1978	Succeeded by Tulku
