= Gowie Corby Plays Chicken =

1979 novel by Gene Kemp

1979 p/b edition (publ. Puffin Books)

Gowie Corby Plays Chicken (ISBN 9780571114054) is a children's novel by Gene Kemp, set at the fictional Cricklepit Combined primary school in southern England. It was published in 1979.

== Plot ==
The central character is Gowie Corby, a young boy with an absent father, an alcoholic mother and an obsession with horror films. He is highly intelligent but shows little interest in school and exhibits a range of anti-social behaviour. His life changes when an African-American girl, Rosie Lee, comes to live next door and provides him with a positive role-model. He begins to take interest in school and his behaviour improves with the encouragement of a sympathetic teacher. His progress is threatened however, by the intervention of his older brother, who has a record of petty crime and displays racist attitudes towards Rosie and her family.

The main plot is framed by two short chapters which present Gowie as an adult with a young family, the latter chapter providing a twist ending.
