= O Chifrudo =

Theatrical comedy by Miguel M. Abrahão

- Author: Miguel M. Abrahão
- Language: Brazilian Portuguese
- Genre: Comedy
- Publisher: Editora Shekinah (1983) and Editora Agbook (2009)
- Publication date: 1983 (play)
- Publication place: Brazil

O Chifrudo is a theatrical comedy in two acts, written by Miguel M. Abrahão, in 1978 and published first in 1983 in Brazil.

== Plot summary ==
O Chifrudo is a comedy that requires actors with great experience and versatility. This text gave opportunity to the author, Miguel M. Abrahão, to reassess, on his way, one of the most common themes and best known in world literature: the love triangle. The story is not focused on the content melodramatic as one would predict. First and foremost is an acid criticism of consumerism. Dayse, the woman is presented to the public as consumer object, just as Hermes, her husband, her lover, Dondoco, or even the two neighboring, whose profiles are comically different. With surprise ending and original, the piece always captivated audiences in the country and gave great opportunities to actors in search of roles that allow for true theatrical performance and not the easy laughter and obvious humor of modern.

== Bibliography ==
- COUTINHO, Afrânio; SOUSA, J. Galante de. Enciclopédia de literatura brasileira. São Paulo: Global; Rio de Janeiro: Fundação Biblioteca Nacional, Academia Brasileira de Letras, 2001: 2v.
- Sociedade Brasileira de Autores Teatrais
- National Library of Brazil - Archives
