= 1985 (Burgess novel) =

1978 novel by Anthony Burgess

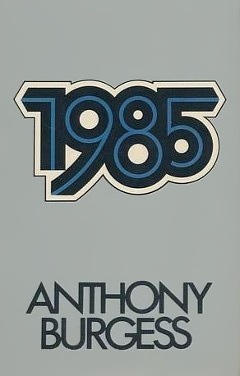
- First edition
- Author: Anthony Burgess
- Language: English
- Genre: Dystopian novel
- Publisher: Hutchinson
- Publication date: 2 October 1978
- Publication place: United Kingdom
- Media type: Print (hardback & paperback)
- Pages: 272 pp
- ISBN: 0-316-11651-3
- OCLC: 4036113
- Dewey Decimal: 823/.9/14
- LC Class: PZ4.B953 Ni PR6052.U638

1985 is a novel by English writer Anthony Burgess. Originally published in 1978, it was inspired by, and was intended as a tribute to, George Orwell's 1949 novel Nineteen Eighty-Four. It was adapted by Guy Meredith as a radio play and broadcast on BBC Radio 3 on 23 January 1985.

== Plot introduction ==
1985 is in two parts. The first part, called "1984", is a series of essays and interviews (Burgess is the voice of the interviewer and the interviewee) discussing aspects of Orwell's book. The basic idea of dystopia is explicated, and term "kakotopia" is also brought up and explored etymologically. The etymology of the word "utopia" is also deconstructed. Burgess treats Orwell as being somewhat bound by his times. Orwell is seen somewhat as a war-exhausted Brit fearing the Soviet threat along with the spectre of atomic war. Orwell is treated as handling these ideas to the exclusion of other phenomena which would come to alter British society. Burgess explicates the distinction between Orwell's "Ingsoc" and the more mundane "English socialism", as Burgess sees this actuality, in the Britain of his time.

The second part is a novella set in 1985, seven years in the future at the time of the novel's being written. Rather than a sequel to Orwell's novel, Burgess uses the same concept. Based on his observation of British society and the world around him in 1978, he suggests how a possible 1985 might be if certain trends continue.

The main trend to which he is referring is the expanding power of trade unions. In the hypothetical 1985 envisioned in the book, the trade unions have become so powerful that they exert full control over society; unions exist for every imaginable occupation. Unions start strikes with little reason, and a strike by one union usually turns into a general strike. Another major theme of the novella is the rise of Islam as a major cultural and political force in Britain, due to large-scale immigration from the Middle East; London abounds with mosques and rich Arabs, and Arab property ownership plays a major role in the story's economic backdrop.

The protagonist is a school teacher, and somewhat of a proponent of Classicism. He is struggling within an education system which puts more stock in more directly practical approaches to study. He is also threatened by street toughs, from day to day. He gains status with them when he loses his professional status. They are outsiders, relative to the above-mentioned system. It is fashionable among them to embrace Classical studies, with a focus on, among other things, Greek and Latin linguistics.

== Plot summary ==
In 1985, former teacher Bev Jones mourns the death of his wife, who was killed in a hospital fire that occurred in the midst of a firemen's union strike, leaving him alone with his 13-year-old daughter Bessie, who is sexually precocious and unable to comprehend the difference between reality and fantasy due to a thalidomide-like drug taken by her pregnant mother. Bev comes to despise the union system, a hostility initially sparked when he lost his job teaching history because the unions favoured education of a practical value, but engendered by the death of his wife and her last words to him—"Don't let them get away with it".

Bev takes a job as a confectioner, but his union membership is revoked when he goes to work one day while his union is on strike, effectively making him unemployable. Knowing that he will soon lose his home, he takes Bessie to a care facility to live with other girls like herself, and becomes a wandering vagrant who lives with a group of similarly unemployed dissenters and commits petty theft to survive. Bev is eventually apprehended during one theft and sentenced to re-education at a state-run psychiatric prison, where he is subjected to propaganda films and lectures in an attempt to convert him into a useful member of society (a theme which Burgess also examines in A Clockwork Orange). Bev also meets the powerful union official Pettigrew, who warns Bev that his day is over and that syndicalism is the future of Britain. Despite the incessant re-education attempts, Bev serves his sentence unconverted and is eventually released.

Bev returns to London upon learning Bessie will be ejected from the care facility because he refuses to recant his beliefs, and ultimately chooses to sell her as a wife to a wealthy sheikh who takes an interest in her during a visit to the Al-Dorchester hotel, under the reasoning she will at least be safe and satisfied this way. Still unemployable and homeless, Bev joins a network called the Free Britons, which aims to provide infrastructure and order during the increasing strike-related chaos sweeping Britain, but eventually learns it is a front for an Islamic group aiming at the re-establishment of Britain as a Muslim state. Based on his education, the Free Britons employ Bev as their mouthpiece and task him with reporting on ongoing strike action, but he is frustrated when his work is censored by the Free Britons' leader, Colonel Lawrence. The spreading strike action eventually escalates into a general strike, reported to the reader mostly in diary form, and King Charles III takes command of the country as it grinds to a halt.

A few months after the strike, Bev is arrested again and sentenced to life in a secure prison hospital where the only way to be released is to be retrieved by a family member. In prison, Bev revives his teaching career by giving informal history lessons to other prisoners, starting with Anglo-Saxon medieval England and continuing through the Renaissance, the Enlightenment, the Industrial Revolution, and well into the 20th century. All the while, unverifiable news and rumours circulate amongst the prisoners about the outside world, some of which suggest that the Muslim conversion of Britain is well-advanced (for instance, Isle of Man residents discovering a stimulant-depressant drug has been replacing alcohol in their beer for years, in line with Islamic dietary laws).

As time passes and Bev's history lessons progress through the 20th century, he finds it increasingly difficult to explain the continuity of history in terms of the present. Unable to do so, he suggests that they can simply start over again, prompting his class to spontaneously dismiss themselves. Now alone and purposeless, and with little chance of having Bessie retrieve him, Bev slips out of his dormitory overnight and deliberately touches the prison's electric fence, killing himself.

== Release details ==
- 1978, US, Little Brown (ISBN 0-316-11651-3), hardback (First edition). Published concurrently in Penthouse Magazine.
- 1978, UK, Hutchinson (ISBN 0-09-136080-3), hardback
- 1980, UK, Arrow (ISBN 0-09-921450-4), paperback
- 2007, CZ, Maťa (ISBN 978-80-7287-119-3), hardback, Czech translation by Milan Mikulášek
- 2013. UK, Serpent's Tail (ISBN 978-1-84668-919-2), paperback
