= David Rees (author) =

English children's writer (1936–1993)

David Bartlett Rees (8 May 1936 – 22 May 1993) was an English author, lecturer and reviewer, known especially for children's and young adult fiction. For The Exeter Blitz he won the 1978 Carnegie Medal from the Library Association, recognising the year's best children's book by a British subject.

== Life ==
David Rees was born in Surbiton in 1936. He attended King's College School, Wimbledon, and Queens' College, Cambridge, where he attained a BA in 1958 and an MA in 1961. He worked as a school teacher before becoming a lecturer at St. Luke's College, Exeter, in 1968. Ten years later he became lecturer in education when the college became a part of the University of Exeter. He remained at the university until 1984, when he began to write full-time. In 1986 he founded the publishing company Third House with fellow writer Peter Robins. His autobiography, Not For Your Hands, was published in 1992.

Rees died in London, 22 May 1993. He was afflicted with HIV/AIDS and had once said, "I've nothing left to write about and it's Aids as much as anything that has done that," but he did not stop writing until 1992.

== Writer ==
Much of his work can be classed as young adult fiction. Some of his fiction was contemporary, some historical, with settings including Devon and Ireland. Quintin's Man (1976) and In the Tent (1979) were the first teen books in the UK to have gay central characters. The Milkman's on his Way (1982) was cited in the House of Lords for promoting homosexuality, in 1999 debate on Section 28. Baroness Knight of Collingtree said that it "explicitly described homosexual intercourse and, indeed, glorified it, encouraging youngsters to believe that it was better than any other sexual way of life."

Rees published two collections of essays on contemporary writers of fiction for children and young adults: The Marble in the Water (1980) and Painted Desert, Green Shade (1984).

== Selected works ==
- Storm Surge (1975)
- Quintin's Man (1976)
- The Missing German (1976)
- Landslip (1977)
- The Spectrum (1977)
- The Ferryman (1977)
- Risks (1977)
- The Exeter Blitz (1978)
- The House that Moved (1978)
- The Green Bough of Liberty (1979)
- In the Tent (1979)
- Silence (1979)
- The Marble in the Water (1980) —essays
- Holly, Mud and Whisky (1981)
- The Milkman's on His Way (1982)
- The Estuary (1983)
- Painted Desert, Green Shade (1984) —essays
- Islands (1984) —short story collection
- Out of the Winter Gardens (1984)
- A Better Class of Blond: A California Diary (1985) —memoir
- The Hunger (1986)
- Watershed (1986)
- Twos and Threes (1987)
- The Wrong Apple (1987)
- The Flying Island (1988)
- Quince (1988)
- Flux (1988) —short story collection
- The Colour of His Hair (1989)
- Letters to Dorothy (1990) —short story collection
- Dog Days: White Nights (1991) —essays
- Not for Your Hands (1992) —autobiography
- Packing It In (1992) —essays
- Words & Music (1993) —essays
