= Badenheim 1939 =

Israeli novel by Aharon Appelfeld

- First edition (Hebrew)
- Author: Aharon Appelfeld
- Original title: באדנהיים עיר נופש (translit.: Badenhaim `ir nofesh)
- Translator: Dalya Bilu
- Language: Hebrew
- Genre: Allegorical, Satire, Historical novel
- Publisher: David R. Godine (translation)
- Publication date: 1978
- Publication place: Israel
- English publication date: November 1980
- Media type: Print (Hardback & Paperback)
- Pages: 148 pp (Hardback English-language edition)
- ISBN: 0-87923-342-7 (translation hardback edition) & ISBN 0-7043-8026-9 (translation paperback edition)
- OCLC: 6603140
- Dewey Decimal: 892.4/36 19
- LC Class: PJ5054.A755 B3413 1980

Badenheim 1939 is an Israeli novel by Aharon Appelfeld. First published in Hebrew in 1978 as באדנהיים עיר נופש (Badenhaim `ir nofesh, 'resort town Badenheim'), it was his first novel to be translated into English, and was subsequently translated into many other languages. Described as "the greatest novel of the Holocaust", this novel is an allegorical satire that tells the story of a fictional resort town in Austria shortly before its residents are relocated to Nazi concentration camps in German-occupied Poland.

== Plot summary ==
Badenheim is a primarily Jewish resort town in (German-occupied) Austria that hosts a yearly arts festival, organized by Dr. Pappenheim. Slowly, the Nazi regime, represented by the "Sanitation Department", begins shutting down the town and preparing to move its residents to Eastern Europe. The citizens begin blaming each other and losing their minds. Despite impending doom, others remain optimistic and refuse to see the coming Holocaust.

== Characters in Badenheim 1939 ==
Dr. Pappenheim
an optimistic and eccentric impresario who visits Badenheim each summer to organize the annual music festival. He craves structure, constantly refers to schedules and timetables, but is always able to find positive explanations for the most ominous of actions.
Frau Zauberblit
an escapee from a nearby sanatorium, she appears to have mild symptoms of tuberculosis. In her gay straw hat, she enjoys the companionship and culture that Badenheim provides.
Martin
the local pharmacist, is self-conscious and quick to blame himself for the problems of others. He is dedicated to his ailing wife, Trude.
Trude
Martin’s wife; stricken with severe depression and paranoia; she constantly awaits news from her daughter.
Sally and Gertie
two local middle-aged prostitutes, largely accepted by the community.
Mandelbaum
an eccentric musician who arrives late in the season along with a musical trio.
Dr. Shutz
a boyish, love-starved doctor who is in love with a visiting schoolgirl who he soon learns is pregnant.
Dr. Langmann
claiming his Austrian heritage with pride, he is quick to denounce his Judaism in order to maintain his status.
Karl and Lotte
a couple who journey to Badenheim for the music festival. Karl has dragged a skeptical Lotte to the town, but it is Karl who loses his grip on reality as the summer wears on.
Leon Samitzky
a musician who migrated from Poland as a child and still recalls his native land with fondness.
The yanuka
Nahum Slotzker, a Polish child and musical prodigy brought to Badenheim by Dr. Pappenheim. (“Yanuka” is an Aramaic word meaning “child prodigy,” often used to describe very young and very bright Talmudic scholars.).
The rabbi
old, infirm and forgotten, he appears in his wheelchair very late in the novel, lamenting in an incomprehensible mixture of Yiddish and Hebrew.

== Text history ==
Aharon Appelfeld first published the novel as a short story entitled "Badenheim 1939" in the Hebrew journal Moznaim 36 (Dec. 1972), pp. 21-35. An English translation by Betsy Rosenberg was published in Ariel 35 (1974), pp. 3-23. That translation was reprinted in TriQuartely 39 (1977). The short, original version is worth reading and of great interest to scholars. Edited by Ken Frieden, Betsy Rosenberg's revised translation of the story was reprinted in The B.G. Rudolph Lectures in Judaic Studies, New Series, Lecture 3; preface + pp. 1–30.

== Adaptation ==
In 1995, an adaptation was directed and choreographed by Ian Spink, written by Sian Evans with music by Orlando Gough, first staged at Riverside Studios in Hammersmith, London.

In 2010, a stage version of the novel was staged, written by Sir Arnold Wesker with music by Julian Phillips, at the Guildhall School of Music & Drama in London in November 2010.
