= Miguel M. Abrahão =

Brazilian writer

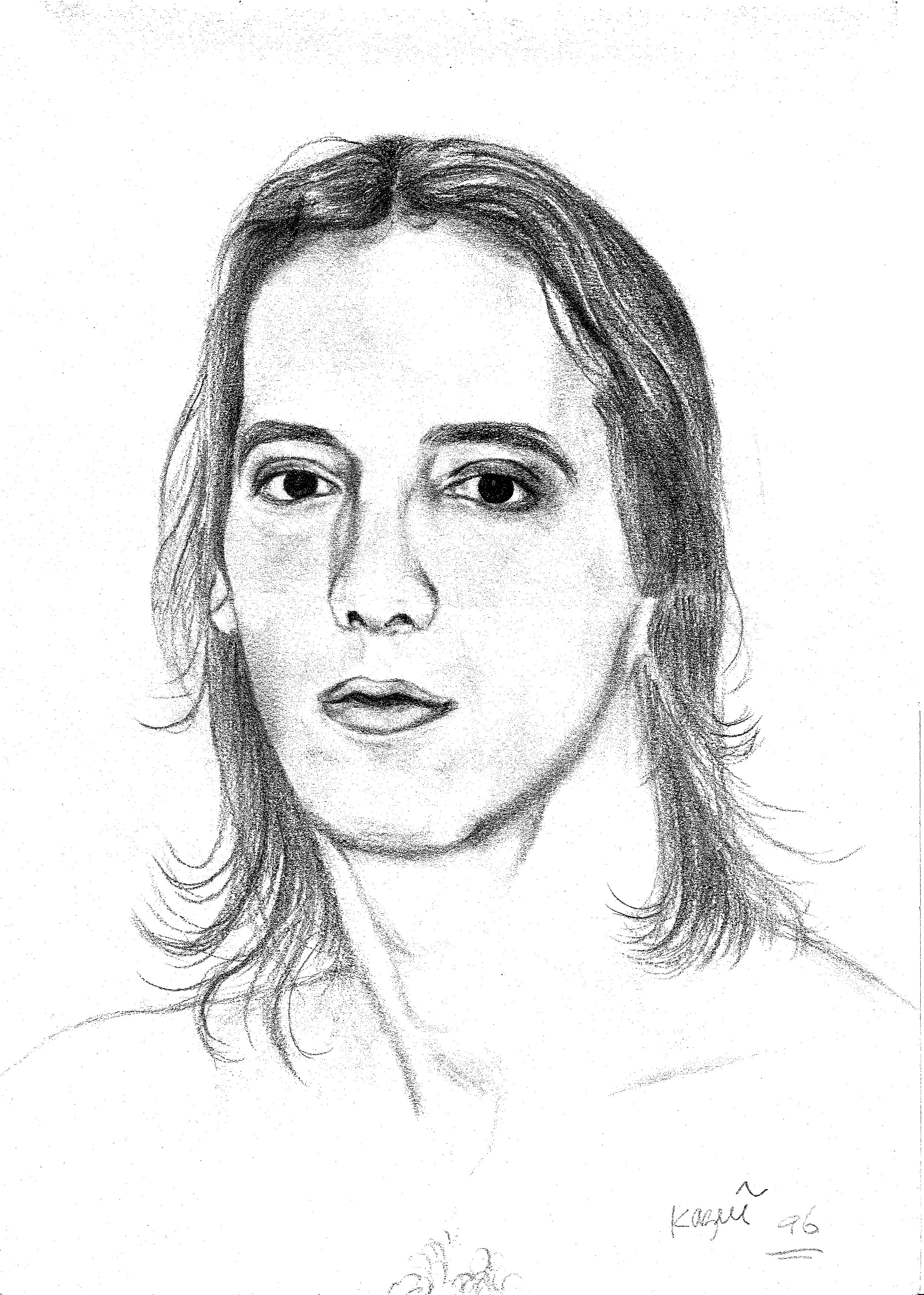
- Pencil portrait
- Born: Miguel Martins Abrahão; January 25, 1961 (age 65); São Paulo, SP, Brazil
- Occupations: Historian, writer and playwright
- Spouse: Silvia Abrahão
- Children: Daniel M. Abrahão, Filipe M. Abrahão, Guilherme M. Abrahão
- Writing career
- Notable works: A Pele do Ogro, A Escola, O Dinheiro, "The Byzantine - a Novel"

Miguel Martins Abrahão is a prolific Brazilian writer and dramatist, author of numerous plays and books.

== Life ==
Born in São Paulo, Brazil, on January 25, 1961, Miguel M. Abrahão spent much of his youth in São Paulo, and currently, resides in Rio de Janeiro, with his wife and children.

He graduated in history, in pedagogy and journalism, having held various activities in educational institutions, besides devoting much of his time on literature.

He taught History of Brazil for the undergraduate program in journalism at the Unimep (Universidade Metodista de Piracicaba) in the 1980s. In this educational institution was also responsible for implementing the Center Theatre UNIMEP in 1979 and coordinated all activities until theatrical 1981.

Most of his work for children and youth, however, although written during his teens, was only published from 1983 onwards.

== Selected works ==
=== Plays ===
Sources:

- As aventuras do Saci Pererê (children's, 1973)
- Pimpa, a Tartaruga (children's, 1973)
- O Dinheiro (Comedy, 1976)
- Armadilha (peça) (drama, 1976)
- No Mundo Encantado da Carochinha (children's, 1976)
- O Descasamento (Comedy, 1977)
- Pensão Maloca (Comedy, 1977)
- A Casa (Comedy, 1978)
- O Covil das Raposas (Comedy, 1978)
- O Chifrudo (Comedy, 1978)
- Pássaro da Manhã (teen drama, 1978)
- Alta-Sociedade (Comedy, 1978)
- O Minuto Mágico (Comedy, 1981)
- As Comadres (Comedy, 1981)
- Três (drama, 1981)
- A Escola (historical drama, 1983)
- Bandidos Mareados (children's, 1983)
- O Rouxinol do Imperador (children's, 1992)

=== Novels ===
- The Byzantine - A Novel - O Bizantino (1984)
- A Pele do Ogro (1996)
- O Strip do Diabo (1996)
- A Escola (2007)

=== Children's book ===
Sources:

- As Aventuras de Nina, a Elefanta Esquisita (1971)
- As aventuras do Saci Pererê (1973)
- Biquinho (1973)
- Pimpa, a Tartaruga (1973)
- Confissões de um Dragão (1974)
- Lateco (1974)
- Arabela (1974)
- Junior, o Pato (1974)
- Bonnie e Clyde (1975)
- O Mistério da Cuca (1975)
- O Império dos Bichos (1979)
- O Caso da Pérola Negra (1983)

==== Non-fiction: The Story of Civilization ====
- Introdução aos Estudos Históricos (Editora Salesiana, 1985)
- História Antiga e Medieval (Editora Salesiana, 1985)
- História Antiga (Editora Agbook, 1992)
- História Medieval (Editora Agbook, 1992)
