= Hello, I Must Be Going (book) =

Hello, I Must Be Going: Groucho and His Friends
- Front cover of the first edition
- Author: Charlotte Chandler
- Subject: Groucho Marx
- Genre: Biography
- Publisher: Doubleday
- Publication date: 1978

Hello, I Must Be Going: Groucho and His Friends is a 1978 biography of Groucho Marx by Charlotte Chandler. The biography was written towards the end of Groucho's life (and published after his death), and chronicles many interviews between Chandler and Groucho. When asked for an interview, Groucho declined, however he invited Charlotte to his house so he could tell her no in person. After several hours of conversation Groucho asked "Why aren't you writing?" Anecdotes and stories of Groucho's life and career as a star of stage and screen are hilariously told by his contemporaries and lifelong friends. Stories from Groucho's life from the beginning of the 20th century conjure up a picture of great poverty and great wealth and give the reader an insight to the phenomenon that was the Marx Brothers and an understanding of their individual relationships with colleagues and friends, and with one another. In addition to the "old timers" there are interviews and comment from Woody Allen, Bill Cosby and Jack Nicholson. The 1992 paperback edition features an introduction by Cosby.
