= Go-Boy! =

Book by Roger Caron

- Memoirs of a Life Behind Bars (first edition)
- Author: Roger Caron
- Cover artist: Peter F. Perko
- Language: English
- Genre: Autobiography
- Set in: Canadian prison
- Publisher: McGraw-Hill Ryerson, CA, Hushion House Publishing, CA
- Publication date: 1978
- Publication place: Canada
- Media type: Print (hardback and paperback)
- Pages: 264 (first edition)
- Award: Governor General’s Literary Award
- ISBN: 9780070825352
- Followed by: "Bingo!"

Go-Boy! Memoirs of a Life Behind Bars is an autobiography by Roger Caron, written while incarcerated at Collins Bay Institution, in which he chronicles two decades of crime and prison escapes. The book, includes a foreword by Canadian author Pierre Berton, and was published in Canada by McGraw-Hill Ryerson on hardcover in 1978. The paperback iteration includes an introduction by Canadian author Ron Corbett, which was released in 2003 by Hushion House Publishing. Go-Boy! won the 1978 Governor General's Literary Award for English-language non-fiction.

== Backstory ==
"Go-Boy! Go-Boy!" is prison slang for a runner and chanted by other inmates as encouragement during an escape attempt.

In his book, Caron gives a personal account of his life behind bars. Roger "Mad Dog" Caron, was a Canadian bank robber. For robbing 75 banks, he spent 24 years in jail, 12 of them in solitary confinement. He escaped prison on 13 different occasions.

== Synopsis ==
The book is a gritty and often brutal account of prison life. It begins on the morning of October 17, 1954, when Caron at age 16, leaves home for the first time, scared and shackled on a reformatory bus called the Black Maria, on his way to the Guelph Reformatory.

Caron writes of himself: "Everything that could happen to a person in prison–everything that could be done to someone–has been done to me."

== Awards ==
Go-Boy! received the 1978 Governor General's Award for English-language non-fiction.

== Adaptations ==
In September 2004, Canadian film and television production company Paradox Pictures announced that it had secured the rights to Go-Boy! and was already working on a screenplay. A month later, Go-Boy! was entered into a pitch competition at the Raindance Film Festival. The panel of judges, which included screenwriter Neil Jordan (The Crying Game), and the producer of Bend It Like Beckham, voted it first runner up out of 29 other submissions.

The 75-minute feature-length documentary film Go-Boy! Memories of A Life Behind Bars, which chronicles the physical and psychological effects of the prison system as seen through Caron's eyes, was released by Paradox Pictures. It premiered as the closing night film at the Kingston Canadian Film Festival in March 2019. It was screened at the Orlando Film Festival in October 2019, and at the Windsor International Film Festival in November 2019, where at both screenings, was nominated for "Best Documentary Feature" and for "The Insight Award".

The film which took 10 years to produce, was opening night screening in Caron's hometown of Cornwall Ontario, at the Aultsville Filmfest in January 2020. In attendance were Caron's sister Sue MacGregor, and producer Rob Lindsay, who was 15 years old when he first read the book. In creating the film, he used archival footage and present-day interviews, and stated “I tried to be fair to both sides, (chronicling both Caron’s accomplishments and his notorious criminal side).” In Canada, the film first aired on April 9, 2021 on the CBC Documentary Channel.

== Reception ==
Go-Boy! which received widespread acclaim for its insights into prison life, sold over 600,000 copies. Caron received considerable recognition, including praise from then Canadian prime minister Pierre Trudeau as being a "great Canadian".
