= William L. Breit =

American economist (1933–2011)

William Breit (1933–2011) was an American economist, mystery novelist, and professional comedian. Breit was born in New Orleans. He received his undergraduate and master's degrees from the University of Texas and his Ph.D. from Michigan State University in 1961. He was an Assistant and associate professor of economics at Louisiana State University (1961–1965) On the recommendation of Milton Friedman he was interviewed and hired at the University of Virginia where he was Associate Professor and Professor of Economics (1965–1983). He returned to his San Antonio as the E.M. Stevens Distinguished Professor of Economics at Trinity University in 1983 and retired as the Vernon F. Taylor Distinguished Professor Emeritus in 2002. He is considered an expert in the history of economic thought and anti-trust economics. He established the Nobel Laureate Lecture Series at Trinity University and is most notable as a mystery novelist (with Kenneth Elzinga) where their murder mysteries are solved by applying basic economic principles.

== Books ==
- Readings in Microeconomics with Harold M. Hochman (New York: Holt, Rinehart and Winston, 1968).
- Readings in Microeconomics, with Harold M. Hochman, Second Revised Edition (New York: Holt, Rinehart and Winston, 1971). Cloth and paper editions. (Italian translation, 1971; Spanish translation, 1973.)
- The Academic Scribblers: American Economists in Collision with Roger L. Ransom (New York: Holt, Rinehart and Winston, 1971).
- Science and Ceremony: The Institutional Economics of C.E. Ayres with a foreword by John Kenneth Galbraith (Co-Editor and Contributor with W.P. Culbertson Jr.) (Austin: The University of Texas Press, 1976).
- The Antitrust Penalties: A Study in Law and Economics, with Kenneth G. Elzinga (New Haven: Yale University Press, 1976.) [Selected as Book of the Month Alternate by McGraw-Hill Management Book Guild; awarded 1977 Phi Beta Kappa Book Prize.] Cited by Justice Burger in Texas Industries v Radcliff Materials, 451 U.S. 630, 636 (1981).
- Murder at the Margin by Marshall Jevons (joint pseudonym with Kenneth Elzinga) (Glen Ridge: Thomas Horton and Daughters, 1978). Paperback, 1979.
- The Academic Scribblers, Revised Edition, with Roger Ranson (Chicago: Dryden Press, 1982).
- The Antitrust Casebook: Milestones in Economic Regulation. with Kenneth Elzinga (Chicago: Dryden Press, 1982).
- The Fatal Equilibrium by Marshall Jevons (joint pseudonym with Kenneth Elzinga) (Cambridge: The MIT Press, 1985) [Published in paperback edition by Ballantine Books, New York, 1986.] [Translated into Japanese and published by Nihon Keizai Shimbunsha Ltd., Tokyo, 1986.] [Translated into Korean and published by Book & World Publishers, Seoul, 2001.] [Translated into French and published by Economica of Paris]
- Antitrust Penalty Reform: An Economic Analysis, with Kenneth Elzinga (Washington: The American Enterprise Institute for Public Policy Research, 1986).
- Readings in Microeconomics, with Harold M. Hochman and Edward Saueracker, Third Edition (St. Louis: Times Mirror/Mosby College Publishing, 1986).
- Lives of the Laureates: Seven Nobel Economists, with co-editor Roger W. Spencer (Cambridge: The MIT Press, 1986). [Translated into Portuguese and published by Forense-Universitaria, Rio de Janeiro, 1988.] [Translated into Japanese and published by Otas Kenkyujo, Tokyo, 1989.]
- The Antitrust Casebook, Second Revised Edition with Kenneth Elzinga (Chicago: Dryden Press, 1989).
- Lives of the Laureates: Ten Nobel Economists, Second Revised Edition with Roger Spencer (Cambridge: The MIT Press, 1990). [Translated into Thai and published by Bhannakij Trading Ltd., Bangkok, 1991.] [Translated into Indonesian by PT Gramedia Pustaka Utama, Jakarta, 1992.] [Translated into Spanish and published by Editorial Celeste, Madrid, 1993.] [Translated into Italian and published by Il Sole 24 Ore Libri of Milan, 1992.]
- Murder at the Margin by Marshall Jevons (joint pseudonym with Kenneth Elzinga) (Princeton: Princeton University Press, 1993). Cloth and paperback editions, 1993. [A critical edition of the 1978 mystery novel reissued by Princeton University Press with a new “Foreword” by Herbert Stein and a new “Afterword” by Marshall Jevons.] [Translated into Spanish and published by Alianza Editorial, Madrid, 1996.] [Translated into Korean and published by Book & World Publishers, Seoul 2001.] [Translated into French and published by Economica of Paris]
- Lives of the Laureates: Thirteen Nobel Economists, Third Revised Edition with Roger Spencer (Cambridge: The MIT Press, 1995.) [Published in paperback edition by MIT Press, Cambridge, 1997.] [Translated into Chinese (complex character) and published by Commonwealth Publishing Company, Taipei, 1998.] [Translated into Chinese (simplified character) and published by the Hainan Publishing House, Hainan, forthcoming.]
- A Deadly Indifference by Marshall Jevons (joint pseudonym with Kenneth Elzinga) (New York: Carroll & Graf, 1995). [Published in paperback edition by Princeton University Press, Princeton, 1998.] [Translated into Korean and published by Book & World Publishers, Seoul, 2001.] [Translated into French and published by Economica of Paris]
- The Antitrust Casebook: Milestones in Economic Regulation, Third Edition with Kenneth Elzinga (Fort Worth: The Dryden Press, 1996).
- The Academic Scribblers, Third Edition with Roger Ransom, with a “Foreword” by Robert M. Solow and “Afterword” by the authors (Princeton: Princeton University Press, 1998). [Translated into Chinese (simplified) and published by Liang Jing Publishing Studio, Beijing]
- Lives of the Laureates: Eighteen Nobel Economists, with Barry T. Hirsch, 4th ed., Cambridge, Mass.: MIT Press, 2004.
- Lives of the Laureates: Twenty Three Nobel Economists, with Barry T. Hirsch, 5th ed., Cambridge, Mass.: MIT Press, 2009.

== Articles ==
- “The Debt Burden and Future Generations: A Review of the Controversy,” Proceedings of the Fifty-Eighth Annual Conference on Taxation, National Taxpayers Union, 1965.
- “Some Neglected Early Critics of the Wages Fund Theory,” Southwestern Social Science Quarterly, June, 1967.
- “The Wages Fund Controversy Revisited,” Canadian Journal of Economics and Political Science, November, 1967.
- “Public-Goods Interaction in Stackelberg Geometry,” Western Economic Journal, March, 1968.
- “Approaches to Oligopoly,” Social Science Quarterly, June, 1968.
- “Oligopoly Symposium: Reply to Hattwick, Sailors and Barton,” Social Science Quarterly, March, 1969.
- “Some Early Unconventional Wisdom on Utility Regulation,” Social Science Quarterly, March, 1970.
- “Distributional Equality and Aggregate Utility,” (with W.P. Culbertson Jr.) American Economic Review, June, 1970.
- “Markets,” Encyclopedia International, 1971.
- “Social Responsibility and the Corporation: Discussion,” Journal of Economic Issues, March, 1972.
- “Distributional Equality and Aggregate Utility: Reply,” (with W.P. Culbertson Jr.) American Economic Review, June, 1972.
- “Antitrust Penalties and Attitudes Toward Risk: An Economic Analysis,” (with Kenneth G. Elzinga) Harvard Law Review, February, 1973.
- “The Development of Clarence Ayres’s Theoretical Institutionalism,” Social Science Quarterly, September, 1973.
- “Income Redistribution and Efficiency Norms,” in Redistribution Through Public Choice, eds., H.M. Hochman and G.E. Peterson (New York: Columbia University Press, 1974).
- “The Instruments of Antitrust Enforcement,” (with Kenneth G. Elzinga) in The Antitrust Dilemma, eds., J. Dalton and S. Levin (Lexington: D.C. Heath and Co., 1974).
- “Private Actions – The Purposes Sought and the Results Achieved: The Economist’s View,” (with Kenneth G. Elzinga) Antitrust Law Journal, Spring, 1974.
- “Antitrust Enforcement and Economic Efficiency: The Uneasy Case for Treble Damages,” (with Kenneth G. Elzinga) Journal of Law and Economics, October, 1974.
- “Product Differentiation and Institutionalism: New Shadows on an Old Terrain,” (with Kenneth G. Elzinga) Journal of Economic Issues, December, 1974.
- “The Effectiveness of Private Treble Damages as an Antitrust Enforcement Mechanism: Efficiency and Equity Considerations,” Southwestern University Law Review, Vol. 8, 1976.
- “Starving the Leviathan: Balanced Budget Prescriptions Before Keynes,” in Fiscal Responsibility in Constitutional Democracy, edited by James M. Buchanan and Richard E. Wagner (Leiden: Martinus Nijhoff, 1978).
- “Ayres, Clarence Edwin,” in International Encyclopedia of the Social Sciences, Biographical Supplement (New York: The Free Press, 1980).
- “Ezra Pound and the GNP,” (with Kenneth G. Elzinga) Southern Economic Journal, January, 1980.
- “Information for Antitrust and Business Activity: Line of Business Reporting,” (with Kenneth G. Elzinga) in The Federal Trade Commission Since 1970, edited by Kenneth W. Clarkson and Timothy J. Muris (Cambridge: Cambridge University Press, 1981).
- “Mr. Friedman’s Strictures on Murder at the Margin,” (with Kenneth G. Elzinga) Public Choice, Vol. 36, 1981.
- “New Approaches to Antitrust Damages: The Alternatives to Mandatory Trebling,” (with Joe Sims and Others) The Business Lawyer, American Bar Association, 1984.
- “Galbraith and Friedman: Two Versions of Economic Reality,” Journal of Post Keynesian Economics, Fall, 1984.
- “Private Antitrust Enforcement: The New Learning,” (with Kenneth G. Elzinga) Journal of Law and Economics, May, 1985.
- “Biography and the Making of Economic Worlds,” Southern Economic Journal, April, 1987.
- “Creating the Virginia School: Charlottesville as an Academic Environment in the 1960s,” Economic Inquiry, October, 1987.
- “Introduction” to “Political Economy 1957–1982,” by James M. Buchanan in Ideas, Their Origins, and Their Consequences (Washington, D.C.: American Enterprise Institute, 1988).
- “Institutional Economics as an Ideological Movement” in Philosophy, History and Social Action, edited by Sidney Hook, William L. O’Neill and Roger O’Toole (Dordrecht and Boston: Kluwer Academic Publishers, 1988). [This book is a volume in the “Boston Studies in the Philosophy of Science” series.]
- “Resale Price Maintenance: What Do Economists Know and When Did They Know It?,” Journal of Institutional and Theoretical Economics, March, 1991.
- “Discrimination and Diversity: Market and Non-Market Settings,” (with John Horowitz), Public Choice, Vol. 84, 1995.
- “The Yeager Mystique: The Polymath as Teacher, Scholar and Colleague” (with Kenneth G. Elzinga and Thomas D. Willett), Eastern Economic Journal, Vol. 22, Spring 1996.
- "Stone, Sir John Richard N." in An Encyclopedia of Keynesian Economics, edited by Thomas Cate, (Cheltenham, UK: Edward Elgar, 1997).
- "Reputation versus Influence: The Evidence from Textbook References" (with John H. Huston), Eastern Economic Journal, Vol. 23, Fall 1997.
- “In Memoriam: Herbert Stein,” Southern Economic Journal, vol. 66, April 2002.
- "Economics as Detective Fiction,” with Kenneth Elzinga Journal of Economic Education,Fall 2002.

== Awards and honors ==
- Research grant, Wilson Gee Institute for Research in the Social Sciences, 1966; 1972
- Sesquicentennial Associate, Center for Advanced Studies, University of Virginia, 1973–1974; 1981–1982
- Senior Research Associate, Thomas Jefferson Center for Political Economy, University of Virginia, 1975–1976
- 1977 Phi Beta Kappa Book Prize for The Antitrust Penalties: A Study in the Law and Economics (Yale University Press, 1976) (with Kenneth G. Elzinga)
- Adjunct Scholar, American Enterprise Institute for Public Policy Research, Washington, D.C., 1977–
- Board of Directors, Association for Evolutionary Economics, 1978–1981
- First Vice-President, Southern Economic Association, 1979–1980
- Annual Aldeen Lecture, Wheaton College, 1982
- Commencement Address, Trinity University, 1983
- Invited Plenary Lecture, Southwestern Economics Association Annual Meeting, 1984
- President-Elect, Southern Economic Association, 1984–1985
- President, Southern Economic Association, 1985–1986
- Member, Advisory Board to the Advisory Commission on Intergovernmental Relations, Washington, D.C., 1985–1990
- Annual Lecture in Virginia Political Economy Lecture Series, Center for Study of Public Choice, George Mason University, 1986
- First Annual Erickson Lecture in Economics, Southwest Texas State University, 1988
- Harris Distinguished Professor, Clemson University, 1990
- First Annual Harris Lecture, Clemson University, Spring, 1990
- Honors Convocation Address, Trinity University, Spring 1992
- Winthrop Rockefeller Distinguished Lecturer, University of Arkansas, Fayetteville, 1997
- Inducted into Epsilon of Texas Chapter, Phi Beta Kappa (Honorary), Spring 1998
- Michigan State University Distinguished Alumni Award, 1999
- “The Worlds of William Breit” Southern Economic Association Special Session, Organized by SEA President-elect Charles Holt, Panelists: Kenneth Elzinga, Robert Hebert (remarks given by Mark Thornton, Harold Hochman and Gordon Tullock. Moderated by David J. Zorn, Tampa, Florida, November 18, 2001
- Southwestern Social Sciences Association Distinguished Achievement Award, 2002
- Who's Who in America 57th Edition

== Administrative positions ==
- Director of Graduate Studies in Economics, University of Virginia, 1967–1968
- Director of Honors Program in Economics, University of Virginia, 1967–1974
- Institute Director, Summer Institute on the American Economy, University of Virginia, 1974 and 1975
- Creator and Director of the Trinity University Nobel Economists Lecture Series from 1984 to 2002.

== Editorial duties ==
- Advisory Editor, Social Science Quarterly, 1965–1977
- Board of Editors, Journal of Economic Issues, 1976–1979
- Board of Editors, Research in the History of Economics, 1983–
- Board of Editors, International Social Science Review, 1984–
- Board of Editors, Social Science Journal, 1985–
- Co-Editor (with Kenneth G. Elzinga), Political Economy and Public Policy: an International Series of Monographs in Law and Economics, History of Economic Thought and Public Finance, JAI Press Inc., Greenwich, Conn.

== Visiting appointments ==
- Visiting professor, the Economics Institute, University of Colorado, Summer, 1966
- Visiting professor of economics, University of California, Berkeley, Summer Quarter, 1968
- Visiting professor of economics, The University of Texas at Austin, Spring Semester, 1975
