= Ernest Côté =

Canadian soldier, diplomat & civil servant (1913–2015)

Ernest Adolphe Côté MBE
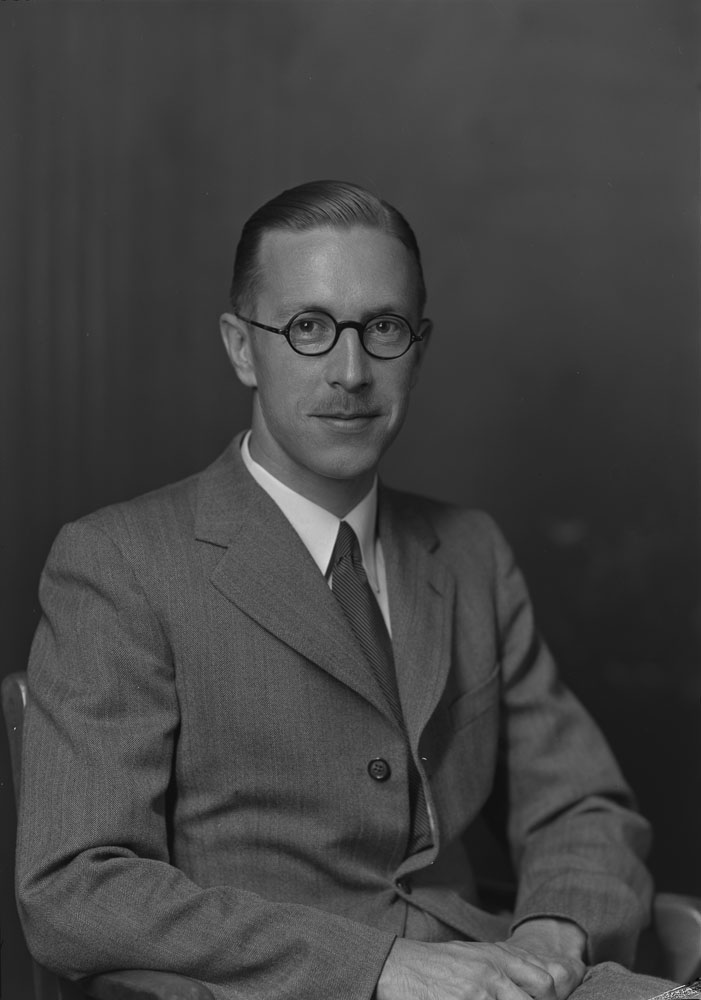
- Côté, c. 1946
- Born: June 12, 1913; Edmonton, Alberta, Canada
- Died: February 25, 2015 (aged 101); Ottawa, Ontario, Canada
- Occupations: Soldier, diplomat and civil servant
- Years active: 1939–2015
- Known for: Serving as the quartermaster of the 3rd Canadian Infantry Division.
- Notable work: Réminiscences et Souvenances (2006)
- Military career
- Allegiance: Canada
- Branch: (Canada) Canadian Army
- Service years: 1939–1945
- Rank: Lieutenant-colonel
- Unit: 3rd Canadian Infantry Division
- Conflicts: Battle of Caen; Battle of the Falaise Gap; Battle of the Scheldt

Ernest Adolphe Côté MBE (12 June 1913 – 25 February 2015), was a Canadian soldier, diplomat and civil servant.

== Youth ==
Côté was born in Edmonton, Alberta, to French-Canadian parents. His parents were Senator Jean Côté and Cécile Côté (née Gagnon). Côté's father was a government land surveyor from Quebec who went west in 1903 to determine the frontier between Alaska and the Yukon, and he subsequently became active as a mining engineer in Alberta, enjoying much success in his field, and then entered politics. Côté's mother came from a wealthy Quebec City family, and she used her wealth to become a great patron of music, having help found the Ladies’ Morning Musical Club of Quebec City (now the Club musical de Québec) and the Ladies’ Musical Club of Edmonton (now the Edmonton Musical Club).

Côté was educated at Edmonton's Jesuit College and one friend recalled: "His French was impeccable — just as one would expect of someone who studied with the Jesuits". Côté was born and grew up in Alberta, but his Jesuit collège classique education was very typical of the education of the Québécois grande bourgeoisie at the time. The collège classique education put a strong emphasis on French, Latin, Greek, the classics, rhetoric, the letters, philosophy, math, European history and Catholic theology. Côté was raised in a French-speaking household and educated in French, but as he grew up in a mostly English-speaking city, he was fluently bilingual. In September 1924, his father died, forcing several of his older brothers to drop out of school to take jobs in order to support their younger siblings.

In 1931, he was awarded a Bachelor of Science at Université Laval. After graduation, Côté worked as a civil servant for the Alberta government and became involved in the Association canadienne-française de l’Alberta that campaigned to preserve French in Alberta. Côté also worked as a radio announcer for Canadian Radio Broadcasting Commission and served as the bilingual host on a radio show that played classical music every week. Starting in 1935, he attended the University of Alberta where he was awarded a LL.B. in 1938 and in 1939 joined the Law Society of Alberta. Côté was always proud to be both a westerner and a French-Canadian. As a member of a minority, Côté defined his sense of Canadian nationalism in civic terms instead of ethnic terms. Côté chose as his motto: "Faire ce qui doit être fait" ("do what must be done").

== Second World War ==
In 1939, he joined the Royal 22^{e} Régiment, better known as the Van Doos, as a lieutenant. On 8 December 1939, he sailed as a part of the 1st Canadian Infantry Division that left Quebec City for Great Britain. Côté's first duty in Britain was to prepare the lavish Christmas feast for the Van Doos, who wanted to feel as if they were still at home. In early 1940, Marshal Maurice Gamelin, the commander of the French Army, visited Britain and he wanted to see the famous Royal 22^{e} Régiment, which as the 22nd Battalion had won more decorations for valour in the First World War than any other battalion in the Canadian Expeditionary Force. Côté was assigned as his guide, and afterwards Gamelin recommended him as a promising young officer. Gamelin's recommendation brought Côté to the attention of his superiors.

He was promoted to warrant officer in March 1940 and then promoted to staff officer in July 1940 with the Anglo-Canadian VII Corps that had the responsibility of guarding the south-east coast of England against a German invasion. Côté was assigned to the VII Corps because of Gamelin's recommendation made six months earlier. A protégé of General Andrew McNaughton, the general officer commanding the VII Corps and then of the First Canadian Army, Côté rose rapidly up the ranks. Côté was impressed to see Guy Simonds, a rising officer who is generally regarded as the most able of Canada's Second World War generals, create the curriculum for a Canadian Junior War Staff Course, single-handed. Côté described Andrew McNaughton as a highly intelligent and charismatic soldier-scientist who was forever coming up with some new scientific idea and who was very popular with the men who served under him. However, Côté expressed much concern about whatever McNaughton, who had spent all of the First World War as a "gunner" (artilleryman) was actually qualified to be a field commander, noting that McNaughton had an obsessive personality for whom no detail was too small. In the summer of 1940, Côté was astonished to see McNaughton call up Colonel James Ralston, the Minister of National Defence, to complain about the appearance of Canadian Army trucks on aesthetic grounds, saying he wanted Ralston to send more aesthetically pleasing trucks. The outcome of the Battle of Britain was far from certain in the summer of 1940, and Côté expected to be facing a German invasion of Britain anytime that summer, which made the question of the appearance of Canadian Army lorries quite secondary. In common with many other officers who served under McNaughton, Côté expressed much admiration for him as a man while also feeling that McNaughton's inability to delegate disqualified him from his chosen profession of field commander.

McNaughton gave Côté's career a major boost by sending him to study at a British Army staff course in September 1940. After graduating from the staff course in Minley Manor, in 1941 he was appointed deputy assistant adjutant general of the 1st Division and then as chief of staff of the 8th Canadian Infantry Brigade. From May 1941 onward, Côté was assigned to the staff of Major-General George Pearkes, a highly decorated First World War veteran who had been awarded the Victoria Cross in 1917, and was now commanding the 1st Division. Côté was the only French-Canadian on Pearkes's staff, and found himself missing the cozy and French-speaking atmosphere of the Royal 22^{e} Régiment. To drive home the point, other staff officers sometimes told Côté to "speak white" when he tried to converse with them in French. Côté found Pearkes to be warm, sympathetic and very brave, but also found that Pearkes was intellectually outclassed by Simonds. In April 1942, Côté voted non in the referendum on overseas conscription, believing the current policy of sending only volunteers overseas was the best way of preserving national unity. In August 1942, Côté was promoted to deputy adjutant general for the I Canadian Corps commanded by Harry Crerar. In this capacity, he was marginally involved in the planning for the Dieppe Raid staged by the 2nd Division on 19 August 1942. Côté recalled that the expectation was that the raid was going to be a great success and that he together with the other officers were shocked with the raid ending in a debacle.

Later in 1942, he was promoted to assistant adjutant general of the First Canadian Army. Much to his own surprise, Côté was made a Member of the Most Excellent Order of the British Empire (MBE). In 1942, he visited Buckingham Palace to be presented with the MBE insignia by King George VI. In 1943, he was promoted to lieutenant-colonel and appointed assistant adjutant and quartermaster-general of the 3rd Canadian Infantry Division, making him responsible for supplying the 15,000 men of the division with all their needs, an extremely important if unglamorous job. Côté wrote in his 2006 memoirs Réminiscences et Souvenances: “I believe we realized pretty quickly that I would be more useful in an administrative role than being in charge of operations, given my lack of experience in the field.” Côté described the 3rd Division as being better run and more honestly run than the 2nd Division. Côté stated that in the 2nd Division if ten jeeps were lost, the division's officers would ask for fifteen replacements whereas the 3rd Division never engaged in this sort of administrative corruption, always reporting its losses truthfully.

In January 1944, Côté was of the few Canadian officers informed of the details of Operation Overlord and was told that the 3rd Division would be landing at a place code-named Juno Beach just beside the French village of Courseulles-sur-Mer in Normandy sometime in the spring of 1944. Côté recalled about the preparations for Overlord in Réminiscences et Souvenances': "For example, we had to plan our routes in advance, even where no paths existed; we had to bring road signs with us to indicate which way soldiers should go and to identify reinforcement gathering places and the supply stations for water, gasoline, diesel and ammunition, and we had to locate the premises of the first small field hospitals and finally predetermine the location of a cemetery." The historian Serge Durflinger who later interviewed Côté recalled that he was intensely concerned as: "He was always hoping he would measure up. Had life prepared him for this? Was he up to that task? The sense of obligation to the men and to success, the details, the care and the sense of sophistication — these are things you don’t get from reading a book about D-Day." By May 1944, Côté reported that his preparations for Overlord were complete and he felt confident that he and his staff were capable of supplying the 3rd Division when it landed in France with all its needs. In March 1944, one of Côté's old friends from the 'Van Doos', Captain Paul Triquet, won the Victoria Cross for his actions in the Battle of Casa Berardi in Italy in December 1943. Côté wrote to his friend upon hearing the news on 8 March 1944: "Il n'y a personne que je connais dont le tempérament était mieux forgé à la bataille et préparé au VC que toi-même" ("There is no one I know whose temper was better forged for battle and prepared for the VC than yourself").

During the planning for Operation Overlord, Côté soon realized that General Rod Keller, the GOC of the 3rd Division, had a drinking problem and was not interested in operational details. Keller's chief of staff, Donald Mingay, set up his office in Côté's office and the two largely by-passed Keller in planning the landing at Juno Beach. Côté called Keller a "conventional tactician" who was "very much a spit and polish officer who cut quite a figure in his battledress. We always cut a spare uniform for him, ironed and ready to go just in case. He cared for the division and was sensitive to any slight on its reputation. He was a very proud man and on top of the division's training.". As part of the preparations for D-Day, Côté insisted that the Catholic and Protestant chaplains attached to the 3rd Division all learn each other's prayers for the dead to ensure the prompt burial of those slain in battle. To prevent corruption, he also ensured that the paymasters in the 3rd Division all serve as assistant adjutants in action, thereby ensuring the paymasters would know exactly how men had been killed in action and prevent officers from claiming the wages of any "ghost soldiers".

On D-Day, 6 June 1944, Côté landed with the 3rd Division on Juno Beach at about 11 am, four hours after the first landing. Côté remembered in a 2009 interview: "I met the British beach group. They were having elevenses. Morning tea. I asked them to have the dead bodies removed from the beach. Not a good sight for morale. I’d been told by Corps headquarters that we had to take a lot of wooden crosses over (on the landing craft). I told them to stuff it." Côté had a low opinion of Keller, observing that the responsibilities of command seemed to be too much for him, and that he was indecisive on D-Day. By contrast, Côté had a high opinion of Robert Wyman, the GOC of 2nd Canadian Armoured Brigade whose "tough, no-nonsense" style and determination to move inland at once was a refreshing contrast to Keller's chronic indecisiveness. Côté helped establish the Canadian headquarters in the French village of Bény-sur-Mer. Côté later stated that Wyman "gave Keller much guidance which Keller appreciated". Côté commented that Keller was a weak leader, but he and the rest of the staff sought "to serve him as best we could". Côté stated that Keller's lack of leadership did not matter on D-Day because of the "division's brigadiers rock solid competent individuals" while the "performance of the brigades during and right after the landing was marvelous".

During the Battle of Caen, which followed the D-Day landings, Lieutenant-General John Crocker, the GOC of I British Corps reported to General Sir Miles Dempsey, the GOC of the 2nd British Army, on 5 July 1944 that Keller was not a leader as he drank constantly on the job and spent too much time with his mistress in London instead of leading his division. Crocker also reported that the real leaders of the 3rd Division were Côté and Mingay, observing the three brigadiers commanding the three brigades that made up the 3rd Division preferred to deal with Côté and Mingay instead of Keller as the general feeling in the division was that Keller was "yellow". The Canadian historian Douglas Delaney wrote that Crocker's statement about the 3rd Division suffering from "despondency" was overstated, being the result of talking with the staff and the brigadiers of the division who wanted to see Keller sacked. Keller finally collapsed under the stress, suffering a nervous break-down, and was relieved of command on 8 August 1944.

Côté served with the 3rd Division during the Battle of Caen and in the Battle of the Scheldt. For courage under fire, Côté was mentioned in dispatches. Another of Côté's friends, General Jean Victor Allard, described Côté as having worked "brilliantly" as quartermaster, commenting that Côté was one of the relatively few French-Canadians to reach a position of authority in an army dominated overwhelmingly by English-Canadians.

In December 1944, he returned to Canada to be promoted colonel and given an array of senior jobs in the Department of National Defence in Ottawa as the vice-adjutant general of medical and dental corps. Côté owed his appointment to the Conscription Crisis of 1944 that saw Prime Minister William Lyon Mackenzie King sack Colonel Ralston as Defence Minister in November 1944 and appoint Ralston's long-standing foe, General McNaughton, as the new Defence minister. McNaughton and Ralston had been feuding ever since 1929 when Ralston had first served as Defence Minister. McNaughton did not trust the officials who had served under Ralston and wanted to bring in men he knew and trusted, which led him to bring Côté to Ottawa. During this time, Côté met Lieutenant Madeleine Frémont and married her on 16 June 1945 in Ottawa. Frémont was the daughter of the Quebec City lawyer Charles Frémont and the feminist Thaïs Lacoste-Frémont. The couple had four children Lucie, Benoît, Denyse and Michel.

== Diplomat and civil servant ==
After the end of the war, Côté left the army to pursue a diplomatic career, joining the Department of External Affairs as a second secretary. As a Second World War veteran, his work as a diplomat was much influenced by his war experiences. Côté believed it was the failure to uphold collective security against fascist aggression in the 1930s that led to the Second World War. As a diplomat in the post-war era, Côté believed very strongly in the value of collective security, multilateralism, and of institutions designed to foster international co-operation such as the United Nations. Mackenzie King always acted as his own foreign minister as he did not trust anyone else to hold the external affairs portfolio, and as such as the young diplomat Côté came to know the prime minister. Much to his disappointment, he discovered that Mackenzie King, who liked to present himself as the special friend of French-Canada, had no interest in changing the English-only work environment at the Ministry of External Affairs.

In November 1945, he arrived in London as part of the Canadian delegation for the first-ever general session of the newly founded United Nations. In 1946, Côté played an important role in writing the charter of newly formed World Health Organization. In 1947 and 1948, he served as the secretary-general of the Canadian delegation at the sessions of the United Nations, which were now being held in New York. At the 1948 fall sessions of the United Nations held in Paris, the Canadian delegation was headed by the Prime Minister, William Lyon Mackenzie King, and Côté served as one of his advisers. Côté met every Canadian prime minister from Mackenzie King to Stephen Harper. In 1949, Côté was stationed with the Canadian high commission in London, where he studied geopolitics at the Imperial Defence College, and then served as the legal adviser in the high commission based in Canada House. In 1952, he returned to Ottawa to take charge of the Consular Division and then served as the head of the Americas Division. In 1952, he also appointed legal counsel to the International Joint Commission in charge of waters shared by the United States and Canada. The chief Canadian delegate to the International Joint Commission from 1950 onward was Côté's old patron General McNaughton, and it was due to his influence that Côté was appointed to the Joint Commission.

In 1955, he was appointed assistant deputy minister in the national resources sector of Northern Affairs department. During this time, he oversaw the restoration of the Fortress of Louisbourg in Cape Breton Island, negotiated a treaty with the United States concerning migratory birds and worked with the development of the St. Lawrence Seaway. During the development of the seaway, the U.S. government wanted control of all three locks, but Côté during his negotiations with the Americans ensured that Canada had control of one of the locks and a say in the running of the other two. In 1963, he was appointed deputy minister of Northern Affairs. His major concern at Northern Affairs was the devolution of power in the Northwest Territories, which had until then been governed from Ottawa as he made the arrangements to ensure that the people of the Northwest Territories could elect their own government. Ever since the Northwest Territories had been created in 1870 following the purchase of Rupert's Land from the Hudson's Bay Company, the federal government had divided the territory as it pleased, ceding parts to various provinces and carving out from it new provinces and the Yukon Territory. The Northwest Territories was populated mostly by First Nations, Métis and Inuit peoples. The further division of the Northwest Territories into a predominantly Inuit territory and a predominantly First Nations and Métis one was considered in the devolution process, but it was decided to let the peoples of the Northwest Territories to decide for themselves whether a further division was necessary. In 1965, he was appointed by Prime Minister Lester Pearson to head the committee that planned the Centennial celebrations of 1967 to mark the 100th anniversary of Confederation.

From 1968 to 1972, Côté sat on the board of governors of the University of Ottawa representing Saint Paul University. During the time of campus protests at Canadian universities, his daughter Denyse was involved in the protests at the University of Ottawa while he sat on the board of the University of Ottawa. She recalled: "I remember it because I was a leftie at the time. He was a very liberal man and we never argued. At one point he drove me to a demonstration at the University of Ottawa and said, 'Good luck with your revolution.' And I said, 'Good look with your repression.' The fact that I was a leftie, he didn't take it personally." As a French-Canadian from Alberta, Côté was against Quebec separatism, seeing all of Canada as his homeland and rejected the concept that Quebec was the special homeland of French-Canadians.

== Deputy Solicitor-General ==
In 1968 after briefly working as a deputy minister at Veteran Affairs, he appointed deputy solicitor-general, making him in charge of overseeing the Royal Canadian Mounted Police, and as such he found himself in the eye of the storm during the 1970 October Crisis. During the October crisis, Côté was in charge of a task force that reported to the prime minister Pierre Trudeau with the responsibility of analyzing intelligence about what was happening in Quebec. Côté role as a deputy solicitor-general caused much tension within his family with one of his children supporting the FLQ as "freedom fighters". Côté himself was somewhat surprised by the Trudeau's use of the War Measures Act to fight the FLQ as he wrote in his memoirs: "The Armed Forces, fully armed, patrolled the streets of Montreal, Quebec and Ottawa and stood guard at the residences of important people. Unheard of in the 20th century!" In December 1970, Côté submitted a report to Trudeau that claimed the FLQ had a total membership of about 150 organized in 30 cells, and concluded: "The Task Force is convinced that the revolutionary thrust of groups in Canada is towards the total breakdown of government as a step towards establishing international socialism".

Côté had a poor working relationship with the Solicitor-General Jean-Pierre Goyer, who was the only cabinet minister he criticized in his memoirs. Goyer appointed his mistress as his chief of staff despite her manifest lack of qualifications and awarded her various privileges such as a free pass with Air Canada, allowing her to fly anywhere she wanted at the expense of the taxpayers. Making things more awkward was that Goyer was married, thus forcing Côté to constantly lie to Madame Goyer when she called the solicitor-general's office inquiring as to where her husband was.

On the morning of 15 April 1971, Côté together with his wife had planned to attend a play, A Criminal Record at the Collins Bay prison written by a prisoner, Peter Madden, and performed by the other prisoners. Instead, he was forced to stay in Ottawa when he received news that a group of prisoners led by the prison barber, Billy Knight, had seized control of Kingston Penitentiary and taken six prison guards as hostages. Côté together with the penitentiaries commissioner Paul Faguy attended an emergency cabinet meeting hosted by the acting prime minister, Edgar Benson, to brief the cabinet on the uprising at Kingston Penitentiary. Trudeau had just married Margaret Sinclair and was on honeymoon in the West Indies. The Cabinet was advised by Côté and Faguy that at present there appeared to be no danger to the lives of the hostages, but warned that sending in the Canadian Forces to retake the prison would probably lead to the hostages being killed. Faguy stated that being kidnapped and killed were the "occupational hazards" of working as a prison guard, and that the longer the crisis lasted, the greater the chance that the hostages would be killed. The cabinet was advised that were two options, namely to give in to the six demands made by Knight or to retake the prison by force. Goyer advocated the use of force, saying that he believed the prisoners would surrender and not kill the hostages if the military stormed the prison. Goyer was opposed to the citizens committee that was attempting to mediate a peaceful end to the crisis, saying one member of the committee, Ron Haggart, was a reporter who would probably make public the demands of the prisoners. The meeting ended with the cabinet agreeing to give the prisoners until Monday to surrender and to reject their demands.

After meeting Knight to discuss his demands, two members of the citizens committee, Ron Haggart, the crime correspondent of the Toronto Telegram newspaper, and an Osgoode Hall Law School professor, Arthur Martin, were flown from Kingston to Ottawa on a Canadian Forces helicopter to meet Goyer and Côté. Martin and Haggart presented Knight's demands and urged acceptance of his demand for a pardon for all those involved in the riot. Côté was most adamant in rejecting the demand for amnesty as he insisted that all those involved in the prison riot would be prosecuted for their actions. The uprising ended on 18 April 1971 before the military was sent in when one of the prisoners who was guarding the hostages, Barrie MacKenzie, agreed to release the hostages, which forced the prisoners to surrender.

After coming into conflict with the Solicitor-General on a number of issues, Côté accused Goyer of having "clearly decided to exercise the functions of deputy minister, contrary to instructions he had received from Prime Minister Pierre Trudeau", and resigned in protest in 1972 against his corruption. In 1972, he was appointed Canadian ambassador to Finland. During his time in Helsinki, he served as the Canadian representative at the Conference on Security and Cooperation in Europe meetings that led to the Helsinki Accords of 1975. He retired in 1975.

== Retirement ==
After his retirement, he settled in Ottawa, where he became a member of Association des communautés francophones d’Ottawa and was active in campaigning for Ontario to support French-language secondary schools. Côté's lobbying was successful and Ontario agreed to fund French-language high schools. He was active on the board of the Royal Canadian Geographical Society, where served as a director and governor. Denis St. Onge, the former president of the Royal Canadian Geographical Society recalled: "He was very proud of his country and its flag. He was such a great guy". In 1991, his wife Madeline died. In 2004, the French government made him a Chevalier de la Légion d'Honneur (Knight of the Legion of Honour}. In 2014, he returned to France three times. On 20 April 2014, Côté returned to Caen to attend the premiere of the film Code secret : Les carottes sont cuites, a documentary directed by the Montreal journalist Alain Stanké. On 6 June 2014, he returned to Juno Beach at the age of 100 to take part in the ceremony marking the 70th anniversary of D-Day. On 11 November 2014, Côté returned to Juno Beach again to lay a wreath to honour the Canadians killed in the Normandy campaign, where his presence as the last living colonel who served in the Canadian Army in the Second World War attracted large crowds.

On 18 December 2014, Côté was robbed by a local Ottawa man named Ian Bush, who tied Côté up with a plastic bag over his head and left him to die. Côté told the media at the time: "Some people think that if you’re 101 years of age, you crumble up and wonder, ‘Oh why, what was happening.’ No, I was just mad." Côté was able to break free and call the Ottawa police, who arrested Bush. Bush was charged with robbery and attempted murder. DNA testing subsequently showed that Bush was responsible for a brutal triple murder in June 2007 of an Ottawa judge Alban Garon, his wife Raymonde, and their neighbour, Marie-Claire Beniskos. In another interview, Côté stated: "Life is such that when you see these things happen to you, you try to get out. The important thing is to concentrate on how to get out of the position in which you happen to be. If you’re afraid and paralyzed, you don’t move. I was never afraid. I was not afraid of the landing, the D-Day landing. I was not afraid of this attacker." Côté's neighbor, J. Blair Seaborn, told the media: "He had the wits about him to realize he had to get the damn bag off his head if he was going to live. He crawled across the floor to where he knew there was some scissors and cut the thing off. He had a good deal of presence of mind for someone who’s just been attacked by a much younger man. He didn’t panic. He did what was necessary. Even at 101 he was not intimidated".

On 18 May 2017, Bush was found guilty of three counts of first degree murder relating to the triple murder of 2007. On 1 December 2017, Bush was found guilty of one count of attempted murder and one count of robbery relating to the December 2014 break-in of Côté's home. Justice Robert Beaudoin stated when sentencing Bush: "I consider Ernest Côté to be a hero. He was certainly a hero when he landed on the beaches of Normandy on D-Day. His friends and family would say that he's a hero every day of his life and throughout his career of public service. He most certainly was a hero on December 18, 2014."

Côte died of natural causes on 25 February 2015. One of his friends, Louise Maffett said of him: "He was an old-school gentleman and with his death an era has passed." His daughter Denyse described him: "Ernest Côté was of course an old-school gentleman. He belonged to this generation of men, always impeccably dressed...fond of rituals most probably acquired from his prolonged stays in Great Britain. He embraced passionately his new role as a single dad when his dear Madeleine passed away, facing the culinary challenges of his sister-in-law, initiating family get-togethers and taking care of children, grandchildren, nephews and nieces". In April 2015, the French government posthumously awarded Côté the Order of La Pléiade to honour him for his work in fighting for more French language schools in Ontario. Durflinger, a historian at the University of Ottawa who interviewed Côté for an oral history project and who remained his friend for the last 15 years of his life recalled: "It is the humility I will remember the most. He was always giving others the credit...He was present at so many compelling events that have become touchstones in our understanding of the 20th century. His was a life of high-level achievement in the service of the country, the likes of which are unlikely to be often repeated.”

== Books and articles ==
- Allard, Jean Victor; Bernier, Serge (1988). The Memoirs of General Jean V. Allard. Vancouver: University of British Columbia Press. ISBN 0774802898.
- Bosher, J. F. (2000). The Gaullist Attack on Canada, 1967-1997. Montreal: McGill University Press. ISBN 9780773520257.
- Delaney, Douglas E. (2012). Corps Commanders: Five British and Canadian Generals at War, 1939-45. Vancouver: University of British Columbia Press. ISBN 978-0774820929.
- Fogarty, Catherine (2021). Murder on the Inside The True Story of the Deadly Riot at Kingston Penitentiary. Windsor: Biblioasis. ISBN 9781771964029.
- Granatstein, Jack (2016). The Weight of Command Voices of Canada's Second World War Generals and Those Who Knew Them. Vancouver: University of British Columbia Press. ISBN 9780774833028.
- MacFarlane, John (2009). Triquet's Cross: A Study of Military Heroism. Montreal: McGill-Queen's Press. ISBN 978-0773577039.
- McLoughlin, Michael (1998). Last Stop, Paris The Assassination of Mario Bachand and the Death of the FLQ. Toronto: 9780670881963. ISBN 9780670881963.
- Robertson, Gordon (2000). Memoirs of a Very Civil Servant: Mackenzie King to Pierre Trudeau. Toronto: University of Toronto Press. ISBN 080204445X.
- Stursberg, Peter (1980). Lester Pearson and the American Dilemma. Toronto: Doubleday Canada. ISBN 0385134797.
- Zuehlke, Mark (2005). Juno Beach: Canada's D-Day Victory. Toronto: Douglas & McIntyre. ISBN 1553650506.
- Zuehlke, Mark (2009). Holding Juno Canada's Heroic Defence of the D-Day Beaches: June 7-12, 1944. Toronto: Douglas and McIntyre. ISBN 9781926685953.
