= Ron Haggart =

Canadian journalist (1927–2011)

Ronald Bancroft Haggart (11 May 1927 – 27 August 2011) was a Canadian journalist.

== Newspaper journalist ==
Haggart was born in Vancouver into a middle-class family. An avid reader, he started writing stories in grade 6 and published a student newspaper in grade 7 that was banned by his teachers. He worked as a student journalist at the University of British Columbia. Val Sears, another student journalist recalled in 2011: "Ron’s greatest coup on that paper was, we got a picture of the dean of engineering dancing with a stripper at an engineering ball and we were told if we ran it, everybody would be fired or something awful. So we ran a blank space on page one with the same caption and then sent the picture to the newspapers downtown, and they all printed it".

Starting in the 1950s, Haggart worked as a journalist variously for the Vancouver Sun, the Globe and Mail, the Toronto Star and the Toronto Telegram newspapers. Haggart moved to Toronto where he covered labour issues for the Globe & Mail. In 1958, the Toronto Star hired him as their municipal affairs columnist. John Honderich, the owner of the Toronto Star stated: "Ron was one of those legendary gruff, tell-em-as-it-is reporters and columnists who delighted in controversy and was never afraid to ruffle feathers". Haggart's former wife, Dinah Arthur, recalled: "He had an interesting take on things and saw things differently than other people...He was very engaging, well liked, and fun to be around". During his marriage to Arthur, Haggart became a father to a daughter, Laura. He had two daughters from other relationships, Kelly and Carrie.

Haggart was opposed to Canada taking part in the Cold War and the nuclear arms race. In an interview in 1961 on CBC news radio he stated: "The mindset that war is inevitable scars our psyches and ruins our concept of normality. The only choice today is peace." From 1958 to 1968, Haggart worked at the Toronto Star. Peter C. Newman, the editor of the Toronto Star in the 1960s stated: "He was afraid of no one and nothing. He wasn’t just a writer who sits down and writes commentary he was also the best reporter at the paper".

The historian Stuart Henderson wrote that Haggart at the Toronto Daily Star along with Michael Valpy of the Globe & Mail were the main defenders in the media of the Yorkville district, which was the main hippie district in the 1960s. When the Fish Net coffee house that was very popular with the younger people in Toronto was forced to close in 1966 by the order of the landlady, Anna Heit, Haggart used his column in the Toronto Daily Star to turn the case into a cause célèbre. Haggart argued that Heit's stated reasons for evicting the Fish Net coffee house from her building were unconvincing, namely that the hippies who were drinking coffee and smoking marijuana were scaring away people from the other businesses in the building. Haggart pointed out that the Fish Net coffee house only opened at 8: 30 pm when the other businesses were all closed. Haggart presented the Fish Net coffee house as a place that allowed the young people of Toronto to have intellectual conversations, albeit ones clouded by marijuana, listen to the latest music and to form friendships and relationships, and argued the eviction of the Fish Net coffee house was an outrage.

== Rumors of War ==
From 1968 to 1971, Haggart worked as the crime correspondent for the Toronto Telegram newspaper. Together with the Toronto lawyer Aubrey Golden, Haggart published a best-selling book in the spring of 1971, Rumors of War, that sharply criticized the Liberal Prime Minister Pierre Trudeau for invoking the War Measures Act during the October Crisis of 1970. Golden and Haggart argued in Rumors of War that the use of the War Measures Act, which suspended all civil liberties in Canada, was grossly disproportionate to the two kidnappings and one murder committed by the FLQ.

Haggart and Golden argued that though the FLQ had committed crimes, but these crimes did not justify the suspension of all civil liberties in Canada, which led to the police arresting hundreds of people in Quebec without charge on the mere suspicion of supporting the FLQ. Golden and Haggart also noted that the War Measures Act led to the police arresting hundreds of people for reasons that had nothing to do with the FLQ as the police in Vancouver used the suspension of civil liberties to try to drive out all hippies. The book caused much controversy as almost all Canadians had supported the use of War Measures Act in the October crisis. Both Haggart and Golden were accused of being "unpatriotic" for criticizing Trudeau and of being "soft on terrorism". Golden later stated: "He [Haggart] was totally inflamed by the injustice of it. He would stay up all night writing and in those days we used typewriters and they were pretty noisy".

== The Kingston Penitentiary riot ==
On 14 April 1971, a prison riot started at Kingston Penitentiary led by the prison barber Billy Knight with the inmates taking six prison guards as hostages. Knight did not trust the Crown to negotiate in good faith and demanded that citizens committee be formed to mediate an end to the crisis. In response, a citizens committee was formed that consisted of Haggart; Desmond Morton, an Irish immigrant and a law professor at the University of Toronto; Aubrey Golden, a Toronto lawyer and a columnist for the Daily Toronto Star newspaper; Arthur Martin, a Toronto lawyer; and William Donkin a lawyer from York Region. Knight had heard of Rumors of War and asked that Haggart be included on the committee. By contrast, the Solicitor-General, Jean-Pierre Goyer, was strongly opposed to Haggart serving on the citizens' committee under the grounds that he just co-written a book that criticized Trudeau and worked as the crime correspondent for the Conservative Toronto Telegram. Goyer tried hard to have Haggart removed from the citizens' committee as he accused him of being biased against the Liberal government and of leaking information about the talks to end the crisis.

At their first meeting with inmates committee, Knight listed to the citizens' committee various demands as he accused the police forces of routinely beating criminals and stated that many of the men being held at Kingston penitentiary had been framed for crimes that they had not committed. Knight complained about the living conditions at Kingston penitentiary-which he described as dehumanizing-and wanted reforms. Knight expressed much fear that the prison guards would beat the inmates if they surrendered and wanted a promise that the guards would not beat the prisoners along with a royal pardon for any criminal acts committed during the riot. Haggart came to form a strong rapport with another member of the inmates' committee, Barrie MacKenzie, who impressed him as a man both more tougher and more reasonable than Knight. When the soldiers of the Royal Canadian Regiment arrived to surround Kingston penitentiary, the inmates expressed much fear that the soldiers were going to massacre them. During a phone call with MacKenzie, Haggart assured him that he just spoken with Major Edward Richmond, the commander of the task force at Kingston and gave him his word that the Army would not storm the prison as long as the hostages were not in danger.

At a second meeting with Knight, Haggart informed him that his demand for a royal pardon was not realistic as the Crown would not agree to such a demand, and offered him the compromise that he would arrange for the inmates to have good legal counsel for the criminal charges they would be facing after the riot ended. Along with Martin, Haggart was flown on a Canadian Army helicopter to Ottawa where he met the Solicitor-General, Jean-Pierre Goyer. Haggart tried to convince Goyer to offer some sort of amnesty along with a commitment that the prison guards would not beat the inmates. Goyer rejected both demands categorically as he stated the government of Canada would not negotiate with Knight. Haggart was then flown back to Kingston. At another meeting with Knight, Haggart came to be exasperated by Knight's grandstanding and arrogance as he found Knight to be egoistical and deluded. By contrast, he came to have a high opinion of MacKenzie whose major interest was in ending the riot without anyone being killed. MacKenzie offered the compromise that if the Crown would guarantee that the inmates would not be sent to Millhaven Institution after the riot ended along with a promise that the prison guards would not beat the inmates, the hostages would be released unharmed. Haggart later wrote in the Toronto Telegram that: "We began, slowly, to see what our role had to be, although curiously we never really articulated it to each other. We had to help the prisoners lose in the military sense of arranging their retreat from the territory they occupied, without letting them lose hope".

John Maloney, the regional director for Corrections Canada for eastern Ontario, accepted on behalf of the Crown the deal that the citizens' committee had made with Knight and MacKenzie. Believing that the crisis was over, Martin and Golden returned to Toronto while Haggart decided to stay in Kingston to oversee the end of the crisis. As Haggart was driving to his motel, he heard Goyer speak on the radio where he announced that the Crown would not make any deal with Knight. Haggart knew that the inmates had transistor radios and would listen to Goyer's speech, which had completely undermined the deal that he just made. Haggart was so shocked by Goyer's speech that he threw up upon arriving at his motel. Goyer's speech destroyed Knight's authority and a more radical group of prisoners led by the outlaw biker Brian Beaucage pushed Knight aside to pursue their own agenda. The agenda that Beaucage pursued turned out to be an extended session of torture and murder as he and his followers had 16 of the "undesirables" (prisoner slang for child molesters) tied to chairs and beaten bloody with much sadism. Though he did not know what Beaucage was planning to do, Hagarrt woke early, on the morning of 17 April 1971, feeling very much at unease as he believed that because of Goyer's speech that something terrible was about to happen in the prison.

To put a stop to the impeding massacre that occurred on the night of 17–18 April, MacKenzie decided to release the hostages. Without the hostages, the inmates would have to surrender as the hostages were the only factor that was preventing the Army from storming the prison. Early in the morning, MacKenzie called Haggart (who was the member of the citizens' committee he trusted the most) to ask him: "How much time do we have to make a decision?" Haggart first told him "until 5:15 am" and then stated "you have to make a decision by 5 am". MacKenzie answered: "We need more time. We're not on the same wavelength in here". MacKenzie demanded that Haggart give him a firm promise that the inmates would not be beaten by the guards once they surrendered and then hung up. At 5: 07 am, MacKenzie again placed a call to Haggart to ask of him: "How much longer do we have?" Haggart had no knowledge that the orders were for the Army to storm the prison later the same day at 12 pm and told MacKenzie: "It's dawn and the army always attacks at dawn". Haggart later admitted that: "I made it up. I had no idea what the war plan was for invading the penitentiary and I still do not know." Haggart heard MacKenzie shout to the other inmates at the top of his voice: "you guys have two minutes to make up your fucking minds!" MacKenzie then informed Haggart he would be releasing the hostages in exchange for a promise that the guards would not beat the prisoners if they surrendered.

The knowledge that the hostages were being released led to a rush to surrender before the Army stormed the prison. A scene of pandemonium ensured as hundreds of prisoners attempted to rush out of the front gate to surrender to be confronted by a squad of soldiers with their bayonets' drawn along with the law professor Desmond Morton of the citizens' committee. Morton shouted to the prisoners in his Irish accent "come forward one at a time, one at a time". When the inmates all pressed forward at once, the soldiers fired warning shots into the air. Haggart who was still on the phone with MacKenzie told him "don't go into the corridor". MacKenzie screamed "tell the fucking screws to back off", but Haggart told him "they're holding their fire". Haggart stated that it was time to release the hostage to calm the situation down. At 6 am, MacKenzie personally walked out the first hostage to be freed, who was Kerry Bushell, who was promptly embraced by his wife. To prevent beatings, MacKenzie told Haggart that he would release one hostage for every sixty prisoners, a demand that Goyer rejected as the solicitor-general wanted all of the hostages freed at once. When MacKenzie refused that demand, Goyer eventually accepted MacKenzie's terms. Over the course of the next hour, the hostages were released.

The last prisoner to surrender was MacKenzie who was greeted by Haggart and Goyer as he walked out. Haggart went up to shake MacKenzie's hand and told him: "Thank you, Barrie. You are a great man". MacKenzie refused to shake Haggart's hand and replied: "Fuck off! I didn't do it for you. I did it for the guys in there". Despite MacKenzie's rudeness, Haggart began his story for the Toronto Telegram newspaper: "Inside Kingston Penitentiary I met Barrie MacKenzie. He is the bravest man I have ever known and he will hate me for saying so." Haggart wrote that MacKenzie had "an endless flow of paranoid fears and delusions" but that he "brought Kingston Penitentiary under control again when it had gone mad." The journalist Grant Buckler wrote that MacKenzie and Haggart deserved much credit for ending the prison riot more or less peacefully as he noted that only 2 men were killed during the Kingston prison riot vs. the 43 men killed during the Attica Prison riot of September 1971, the majority of whom were killed by the New York State troopers as the policemen stormed the Attica prison. Buckler argued that if the Canadian Army been sent to storm Kingston penitentiary that something similar to what happened at Attica later that year might had occurred.

Haggart's reporting of the prison riot in the Toronto Telegram won the National Newspaper Award for 1971 for the best journalism in Canada that year. On 30 October 1971, the Toronto Telegram went out of business and Haggart moved over to the Globe & Mail newspaper. The journalist Scott Young wrote of Haggart's work at the Globe & Mail: "He knows City Hall like a bluejay knows his favourite feeding station. His battles on behalf of the taxpayer, the oppressed...the ordinary rank and file of humanity have given him an identity in this city that would take years to rebuild in another locale".

== Television journalist ==
In 1972, Haggart joined the newly founded Citytv station and launched the CITY news show. At the time, Citytv was mostly known for its "baby blue" soft-core pornographic films that it frequently aired, and Haggart's presence helped to give Citytv more credibility. Haggart then founded the Channel 79 news show.

In March 1975, Haggart left Citytv and joined the Canadian Broadcasting Corporation (CBC). In September 1975, he launched The Fifth Estate television show. Haggart also served as the co-producer of the debate show Faceoff (later renamed as Counterspin). About his work as the producer of The Fifth Estate, Haggart stated in a 1983 interview against efforts to "dumb down" his television show: "Don’t tell me there’s not an audience out there for quality". Haggart used the fact that The Fifth Estate had an average viewership of 2.2 million people to argue that there were people interested in more intellectual TV shows.

Haggart retired in 1991. After his death in 2011, the Canadian Journalists for Free Expression posthumously awarded him the Vox Libera award for the best journalism in Canada. In 2012, his daughter, Kelly Haggart, turned her father's articles about the prison riot into the book Cool Heads at Kingston Pen.

== Work ==
- Haggart, Ron; Golden, Aubrey (1971). Rumours of War. Toronto: New Press. ISBN 9780887700378.
- Haggart, Ron (2012). Cool Heads at Kingston Pen. Toronto: House of Haggart.

== Books ==
- Fogarty, Catherine (2021). Murder on the Inside The True Story of the Deadly Riot at Kingston Penitentiary. Windsor: Biblioasis. ISBN 9781771964029.
- Henderson, Stuart Robert (2011). Making the Scene: Yorkville and Hip Toronto in the 1960s. Toronto: University of Toronto Press. ISBN 978-1442610712.
