= Karen DeYoung =

American journalist

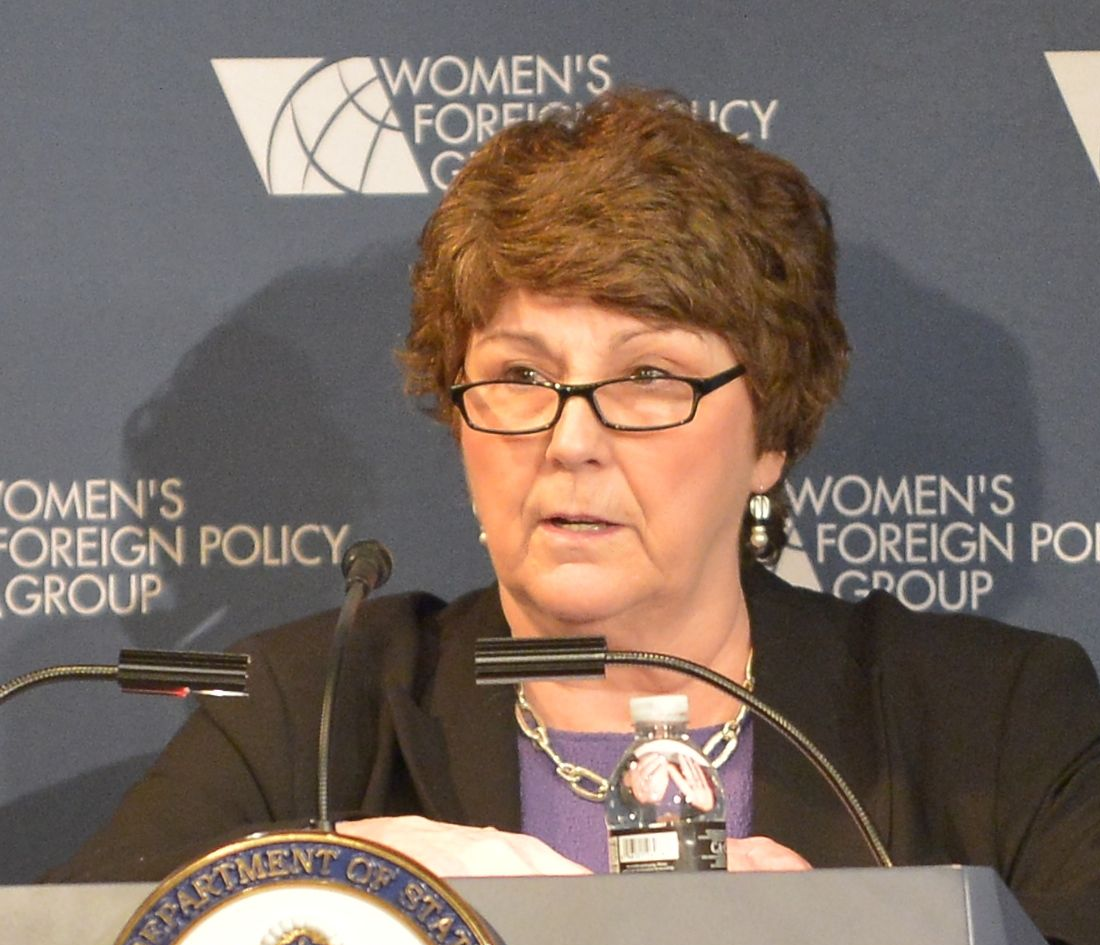
- DeYoung in November 2016
- Born: Florida
- Occupation: Pulitzer Prize winning editor
- Spouse: Henry Champ

Karen DeYoung is a Pulitzer Prize-winning American journalist, and is the associate editor for The Washington Post.

DeYoung was born in Florida and she grew up in St. Petersburg, Florida. She received bachelor's degrees in journalism and communications from the University of Florida.

DeYoung was married to the late Henry Champ, a Canadian journalist based in Washington, D.C.

== Career ==
After graduation, DeYoung worked as a non-staff stringer in West Africa. In 1975, she joined The Washington Post. From 1977 through 1988, she worked for the foreign news operation, as bureau chief for Latin America, foreign editor, and bureau chief in London. In 1989, DeYoung was promoted to the position of national editor. From 2001 to 2003, she covered U.S. foreign policy for The Washington Post.

In the days before the 2003 invasion of Iraq, DeYoung and fellow reporter Dana Priest filed a story with their editors that the CIA had significant doubts about documents alleging an attempted uranium purchase, but The Washington Post did not publish the story until March 22, 2003, after the invasion had begun. Speaking about The Post's pre-war coverage, DeYoung was quoted as saying, "We are inevitably the mouthpiece for whatever administration is in power."

DeYoung is also a member of Washington, D.C.–based think tank the Inter-American Dialogue.

She is the author of the biography Soldier: The Life of Colin Powell, for which she undertook six in-depth and on-the-record interviews with Colin Powell.

== Published works ==
=== Books ===
- DeYoung, Karen (2007). Soldier: The Life of Colin Powell. Vintage. ISBN 978-1-400-07564-5.

=== Videos ===
- Michael Kirk, Mike Wiser, Jim Gilmore, et al. (2016). The secret history of ISIS. Arlington, Virginia : PBS Distribution.
- Jake Tapper, Floyd Abrams, Max Cleland, et al. (2007). War stories : national security & the news. South Burlington, Vt. : Annenberg/CPB.
- Stephen Hess; Karen DeYoung; Joseph D Duffey (2006). Public opinion and the war on terrorism. West Lafayette, IN : National Cable Satellite Corporation.

== Honors and awards ==
- 1981: Maria Moors Cabot Prize for Latin America Reporting
- 2000: Sigma Delta Chi Awards for Foreign Correspondence and Investigative Reporting
- 2003: Weintal Prize for Diplomatic Reporting
- 2009: Overseas Press Club Bob Considine Award for International Affairs reporting
- 2013: Finalist to the Pulitzer Prize in the National Reporting category
- Pulitzer Prize for National Reporting
- Inter-American Press Association award
