= Brian Beaucage =

Canadian gangster (1947–1991)

- Born: Brian Leslie Beaucage; 22 June 1947; St. Catharines, Ontario, Canada
- Died: 3 March 1991 (aged 43); Toronto, Ontario, Canada
- Occupations: Gangster; outlaw biker; drug dealer
- Allegiance: Holocaust Motorcycle Club (1984–1985); Satan's Choice MC (1985–1991)
- Convictions: Manslaughter (1969); Assault causing bodily harm (1971); Assault (1975)
- Penalty: 8 years' imprisonment; 21 months' imprisonment (1971)

Brian Leslie Beaucage (22 June 1947 – 3 March 1991), better known as "Bo" Beaucage, was a Canadian gangster, outlaw biker and convicted criminal best known as one of the leaders of the 1971 Kingston Penitentiary riot. His plea bargain with the Crown in 1971 is one of the most controversial plea bargains in Canadian legal history.

== Entry into crime ==
Beaucage was born in St. Catharines and grew up in London, Ontario. His parents were Leslie Beaucage and Margaret Beaucage (née Black). Beaucage came from a loving middle-class family, and was very close to his mother, who always paid to hire the best defense lawyers to represent him in his trials.

Beaucage was first arrested at the age of 14 for the break and enter into a London house. As a young man, Beaucage accumulated a lengthy criminal record for various violent crimes starting in 1964 as he joined an outlaw biker gang. One policeman from the London police department, Don Andrews, said of Beaucage: "You always knew Brian wasn't going to die a natural death". A prison report described him as: "Beaucage is an intelligent person who resorts to assaultive, aggressive behavior without remorse or provocation. He is considered to be very manipulative and a potentially dangerous person".

== The Kingston Penitentiary riot ==
Beaucage was convicted of manslaughter and sentenced to 8 years in prison on 8 February 1969 after killing a man in London. Initially sent to the Collins Bay Institution, he was reassigned to the Kingston Penitentiary after he attacked a prison guard with a sledgehammer. At Kingston Penitentiary, Beaucage was regarded as a "loner" and as one of the most violent prisoners. Roger Caron, a prisoner at Kingston penitentiary turned writer, described Beaucage along with Wayne Ford and Barrie MacKenzie as being "natural leaders". Caron also wrote that Ford, MacKenzie and Beaucage were the three most toughest prisoners at the Kingston Penitentiary who were "not to be fucked with" by the other prisoners. Caron wrote that most prisoners accepted abuse from the guards in order to be left alone, but that Beaucage was a "rebellious" prisoner who was constantly being sent to solitary confinement, clubbed with nightsticks and being bound with chains owing to his tendency to attack the prison guards.

On 14 April 1971, a prison uprising organized by the prison barber, Billy Knight, began and six guards were taken hostage. Knight regarded the purpose of the uprising as improving conditions in Kingston Penitentiary, but Beaucage was more interested in using his newly acquired freedom to murder the "undesirables" such as the child killer and child molester prisoners who were kept in a separate wing, 1-D, for their own safety. Beaucage especially hated another prisoner, Brian Ensor. Ensor, whose nickname was "the Camel", was an immature child-like man of extremely low intelligence and a pedophile. Ensor was serving a life sentence imposed in 1962 for raping two young girls, both under the age of 10, following testimony at his trial from two psychiatrists that Ensor was unable to control his sexual urges against children and would rape again if released. Ensor was in marked fear of his life after the uprising began and Knight and MacKenzie forced him into a cell for his own protection. Knight who had a rather grandiose view of himself saw the prison riot as a protest that would force the government of Pierre Trudeau to change its policies towards prisoners and was against violence being inflicted on the "undesirables" held in the 1-D wing out of the fear of losing public support. Knight argued in a speech to the prisoners that he wanted the Canadian public to see the prisoners as men instead of "animals". Caron described Beaucage as: "Muscular and athletic, he seemed to operate on the principle that he either liked or disliked you according to your face. He obviously found Billy's profile entirely to his disliking and was itching for the opportunity to rearrange it".

Beaucage disliked Knight, but was assigned by him along with Ford and MacKenzie to serve as the inmate "police force" in charge of keeping order. One child molester prisoner had become the lover of a powerful prisoner, Harold St. Amour, and lived outside of 1-D wing. The man testified at Beaucage's 1971 trial that Beaucage had told him "you don't belong in the general population" and beat him bloody. When a prisoner, Dave Shepley started a fight with another prisoner, John McBride, Beaucage broke up the fight by shouting at Shepley "let the kid go!" Shepley suffered a broken jaw, was released to be treated, and chose to return to the Kingston penitentiary to be with his friends. Upon his return, Sheply aligned himself with Beaucage against Knight.

Knight called for a meeting where he used a megaphone to address the other prisoners about the status of his talks with the government. Beaucage was present in the front row of the meeting and made it his opposition to Knight's leadership by glaring angrily at him. As Knight stated that the talks were going well, Beaucage stormed up onto the stage, told Knight "you're full of shit!" and attacked him, leading to MacKenzie to restrain him. Beaucage screamed at MacKenzie "he's just so full of shit, gambling our lives away like that". Beaucage seized the megaphone and shouted to Knight "you've had it, you're through talking!" Beaucage then mentioned that the Solicitor-General, Jean-Pierre Goyer, had just given a speech saying he would not negotiate with Knight, which the prisoners were aware of by listening to their transistor radios. MacKenzie grabbed the megaphone back from Beaucage. The prisoners shouted "let Knight have his say", but it was clear from that point onwards that Knight was no longer the leader of the uprising. Caron described Beaucage and his followers as becoming more dangerous and unpredictable, and stated that Goyer's speech destroyed Knight's creditability with the other prisoners. Caron wrote in his 1985 memoir Bingo! The Horrifying Eyewitness Account of a Prison Riot: "What was building up inside the dome was a mass suicide pact orchestrated by the insane element". During the uprising, MacKenzie eclipsed Knight as the leader. MacKenzie feared Beaucage as one of the leaders who were intent upon escalating the uprising into a bloodbath and who would veto his plans for a "silent vote" to end the uprising. MacKenzie knew that Beaucage would insist upon an "open vote" and that most of the other prisoners would not oppose him. MacKenzie also knew that in an "open vote" that most prisoners would vote against surrendering out of the fear of appearing cowardly, but in a "silent vote" the surrender option would prevail as most of the prisoners were hungry, tired and terrified of being killed if the soldiers surrounding the prison stormed the penitentiary. After MacKenzie left to negotiate with the citizens committee formed to mediate the crisis, Shepley shouted "the fun is about to begin!" and led a gang into the 4-B wing where the hostages were held, but were blocked by Ford, a man whom none of the other prisoners wanted to fight. Sheply joined by Beaucage and others then turned their attention to the prisoners in the 1-D wing.

Beaucage organized a kangaroo court that sentenced 16 "undesirable" prisoners to death. The "master of the ceremonies" was Sheply who used a megaphone to ask the other prisoners "what shall we do gentleman?" and received such replies as "castrate them!" and "kill them!" Three prisoners who were the lovers of St. Amour tried to hide in his cell when Beaucage stormed in to take them to be tried by the kangaroo court. One of the three, Ron McCorkel, ran away and was chased by Beaucage who seized him. As Beaucage marched McCorkel for his "trial" under the dome, he was heard to say: "I've been waiting four and a half fucking years to get you". On 18 April 1971, the "undesirables" were tied to chairs, had their heads covered with bedsheets and with Beaucage shouting orders were beaten bloody by the other prisoners. Beaucage personally broke the noses of all 16 of the "undesirables". He encouraged the other prisoners who beat the condemned men with their fists, metal bars, hammers and anything else that would inflict pain, which caused the area under the dome to be socked in their pools of their blood. Beaucage used a narrow board with a protruding nail hammered through it to attack the "undesirables" tied into their chairs.

One of the prisoners tied in the circle and beaten bloody, Richard Moore, recalled that he was in intense pain and could barely see as too much of his own blood oozed over his eyes. At that point, his head was dosed in lacquer from the wood workshop while Shepley suggested that Moore be burned alive. Beaucage vetoed that suggestion under the grounds that Moore needed to be tortured more. Moore was not a child molester, but rather a 21-year old automobile thief who had been sentenced to 18 months in prison for stealing a car in 1968, but had received six years in prison and was sent to Kingston penitentiary as a punishment after he escaped from Burwash prison. As Moore was a very attractive young man, many of the other prisoners at Kingston penitentiary had wanted to rape him, which led him to ask to being transferred to the 1-D wing for the "undesirables" for his own safety. Because Moore lived in the 1-D wing, he was widely assumed to be a child molester. One of Beaucage's friends, Robbie Robidoux, asked Moore how many ribs there were in the human body; when Moore replied that he did not know, Robidoux answered by saying that he did not know either and he was about to find out as he was going to break all of Moore's ribs. Robidoux then proceeded to use a metal bar to break all of Moore's ribs. Moore recalled that besides for the pain that it was almost impossible for him to breathe as his ribs were smashed in.

To the tune of blaring rock music, a child molester, Brian Ensor, was beaten very brutally and finally had his throat slashed with a homemade knife. Beaucage seemed to take a sadistic pleasure as Ensor screamed and sobered in pain under the shower of blows to his body while his hood was soaked in his blood. The next prisoner to be killed was Bertrand Robert, a man convicted of murdering his five children by slowly boiling them to death via his hot stove burner, who was beaten with metal pipes with the prisoners told him: "That's for boiling your kids". Although not a child molester, the coroner's report showed that all five of Robert's children had suffered extreme physical abuse which along with the sadistic method of killing his own children had made Robert one of the most hated men in Kingston Penitentiary. To put a stop to the impeding massacre as Beaucage was intent upon torturing and killing all of the "undesirables", MacKenzie, who had returned to the 4-B wing, agreed to release the hostages. MacKenzie spoke on the telephone with Ron Haggart, the crime correspondent of the Toronto Telegram newspaper who was serving on the citizens committee, and agreed to release the hostages at once in exchange for a promise that the prisoners would not be beaten by the prison guards. As Kingston Penitentiary was surrounded by the Ontario Provincial Police along with a detachment of the Canadian Army who were readied to storm the prison, the prisoners had no other choice, but to surrender after the release of the hostages.

== The "Kingston 13" trial ==
Beaucage was charged with two counts of first degree murder for his role in the deaths of Ensor and Robert on 13 July 1971 along with 12 other prisoners. The trial of the "Kingston 13" as the media called the trial in Kingston began on 28 October 1971. The "Kingston 13" trial attracted much media attention from all over Canada and a number of university students from Queen's University showed up in the courtroom to support the accused. Justice William Henderson who oversaw the trial was angry with the casual hippie appearance of the students as he stated that his courtroom would not be "a haven for bums". Justice Henderson ordered the court marshals to ensure that all in the visitors' gallery be "properly dressed" and to turn away those whose clothing and appearance he deemed improper.

During the trial, numerous witnesses testified that Beaucage had organized and led the attacks on the "undesirables". John Zelinsky, a thief who was serving his sentence in Kingston testified that Shepley was talking very loudly about killing all of the "undesirables" and the prison guards taken hostage and that he saw Beaucage drag the "undesirables" from the 1-D wing to the dome that served as the center of prison life. On 22 November 1971, the Crown in an unexpected move made a plea bargain with Beaucage where the charge of two counts of first-degree murder were dropped in exchange for him pleading guilty to assault causing bodily harm with regard to the beating of Ensor. The other 12 accused all made plea bargains to pledge guilty to one count of manslaughter each. Justice Henderson accepted the plea bargain as he argued that the crimes of child molesters were such that it generated such an "irrational" hatred that those who had killed Ensor and Robert could not be held legally responsible. Henderson stated that the sight of "undesirables" such as child molesters, rapists, and child killers were such that: "I doubt if an ordinary man would have had his stability and control", but added that there was no evidence of any intention to commit murder by the accused. Justice Henderson sentenced Beaucage to 21 months in prison to be served concurrently with his eight-year sentence for manslaughter.

The plea bargain along with Justice Henderson's comments-which essentially justified the murders of Ensor and Robert-were extremely controversial at the time and remain so. On 13 December 1971, Michael Valpy of The Globe & Mail revealed that there had been a secret deal to end the trial as Justice Henderson had called several meetings with the defense lawyers and the Crown Attorneys to discuss how to arrange plea bargains to give the accused the lightest possible sentences. In 1974, Beaucage was released from prison, but in 1975 he was convicted of assault. Beaucage spent the next ten years of his life going in and out of prison for various crimes.

== Satan's Choice ==
After his release from prison in 1984, Beaucage joined the Holocaust Motorcycle Club (later renamed as the Annihilators Motorcycle Club in 1988) led by Wayne Kellestine. Beaucage's role in the Kingston prison riot along with his claims to have killed Ensor and Robert had made him into a celebrity in the Canadian underworld. In 1985, Beaucage left the Holocaust club after a dispute with Kellestine and joined the Kitchener chapter of Satan's Choice.

Beaucage had a strong hatred of the Outlaws Motorcycle Club chapter in London and regularly travelled down the 401 highway to London to sell drugs at a price lower than what the Outlaws sold for. The London Outlaw chapter had been a Satan's Choice chapter until 1977 and like other members of Satan's Choice, Beaucage felt a particular dislike for the Outlaws who had defected from Satan's Choice. Peter Edwards, the crime correspondent of The Toronto Star, wrote that Beaucage "adopted the Choice's hatred of the Outlaws with the fervor of a true zealot". On one visit to London, he tried to pull off the sign of the Outlaws' London clubhouse, causing the Outlaws to shoot him. He was wearing a bulletproof vest and survived. The Outlaws placed a contract on Beaucage's life with their policy being "take him out". On 16 January 1987, Beaucage during a visit to London was shot by an Outlaw with .45 caliber handgun, taking a bullet to the heart, but again survived the shooting. Beaucage's heavy use of cocaine and Amphetamines added to his aggression. In common with many other outlaw bikers, Beaucuage worked as a subcontractor for the Mafia, making regular trips to Montreal to work as an enforcer for the Rizzuto family.

He was known for his aggressive and confrontational personality, which led him to being transferred over to the Oshawa chapter after he was involved in quarrels with almost every member of the Kitchener chapter. Lorne Campbell, the president of the Oshawa chapter, quarreled with Beaucage at a Christmas party in 1988 held in a cottage outside of Lindsay. Campbell complained that Beaucage was disparaging Satan's Choice as Campbell maintained: "I'm extremely loyal, so it's argument. He was really running things down. I had been Choice since I was seventeen. That's just not done around me". Afterwards, Campbell decided to kill Beaucage—whose anger issues were becoming too much for him to handle—and only spared him after Beaucage called him on the phone to apologize. Campbell stated that Beaucage was a "big man" who was willing to admit to his faults.

== Murder ==
Beaucage spent the night of 3 March 1991 devoted to drinking, hard drugs and watching pornography in a disreputable Toronto rooming house on Lansdowne Avenue along with his girlfriend and a member of the Loners gang, Frank Passarelli. In his last years, Beaucage had become addicted to heroin and several members of Satan's Choice such as Wayne Kelly were planning his murder. Beaucage ordered Passarelli out of the room so that he could have sex with his girlfriend, which offended Passarelli who told him: "No one is going to ask me to leave for some girl".

On the same night, Beaucage was beheaded in his bed by Passarelli, with his body not found until the next day, being partially devoured by the dogs belonging to another boarder. Campbell stated: "He had to give it to him in his sleep. Brian wasn't a slouch". At the time, the police expressed no surprise about Beaucage's murder, saying he was a violent and disagreeable man, and the only surprise was that it took this long for somebody to saw off his head with a kitchen knife. Another policeman said of Beaucage's murder that he "lived by the sword and died by the sword". Beaucage's lawyer said he was not a typical criminal as he maintained: "He was quite bright, but he lived life on the edge". Passarelli was convicted of second degree murder.

The gruesome nature of Beaucage's murder led it to take on a legendary reputation within Canadian biker circles, being known inaccurately as the "Fifty Whacks with an Ax". In a trilogy of romance novels written by Beaucage's cousin Karen Black, Beaucage appears as the Byronic hero character Dace Devereux, the cousin and lover of the protagonist Liza Devereux.

== Books ==
- Caron, Roger (1985). Bingo! The Horrifying Eyewitness Account of a prison riot. Toronto: Methuen. ISBN 0458997005.
- Edwards, Peter (2013). Unrepentant The Strange and (Sometimes) Terrible Life of Lorne Campbell, Satan's Choice and Hells Angels Biker. Toronto: Vintage Canada. ISBN 9780307362575.
- Fogarty, Catherine (2021). Murder on the Inside The True Story of the Deadly Riot at Kingston Penitentiary. Windsor: Biblioasis. ISBN 9781771964029.
