= 1971 Kingston Penitentiary riot =

Prison riot in Kingston Penitentiary, Canada

The Kingston Penitentiary riot of 1971 was a prison riot that took place, leaving 2 inmates dead at Kingston Penitentiary, in Ontario, Canada, between 14 and 18 April 1971.

== Background ==
Kingston Penitentiary opened on 1 June 1835 and was the oldest prison in Canada. The federal prison was widely considered to be the harshest prison in Canada and in 1971 it held 641 prisoners. A journalist, Ron Tripp, who visited Kingston penitentiary wrote, "As soon you walked in, you had a sense that society had crushed and defeated you. It was a human warehouse of death, decay and horror. Many inmates died of murder and suicide within its walls". Prisoners were not permitted to speak outside of their cells. Solitary confinement was frequently used as a punishment for inmates. At the center of the prison was the dome and in the middle of the dome was a gigantic brass bell that was much hated by the inmates, whose ringing determined everything in a prisoner's life from being woken up at 6:45 am to going to bed at 10:30 pm. Roger Caron, a prisoner at Kingston turned writer, wrote about the bell that was rung 100 times every day, "To the cons it was an object of repugnance and outrage, an unjustifiable punishment. A brass monster that we were convinced had been designed solely to shatter our nerves with its loud and strident ringing. For the prison staff it was the golden cow". Caron complained that in 1971 Kingston penitentiary was still governed by "archaic" Victorian rules under which the prisoners were punished by 30 days in solitary confinement if caught masturbating. The cells were equipped with peep-holes to allow the guards to see if the prisoners were masturbating and many of the prisoners sent to solitary confinement were only guilty of masturbation.

Around the circular dome were 640 cells stacked up on four floors. The cells in Kingston penitentiary were small, cold, drafty, minimally furnished and overrun by rats. Starting in 1966, most of the privileges enjoyed by the prisoners such as a baseball team, writing for a prison magazine, and almost all recreational programs were abolished. In 1968, the Liberal Party under the leadership of Pierre Trudeau won the election of that year under the slogan of the "Just Society". The implication of the "Just Society" platform was that Canada was an unjust society that needed sweeping social reforms, which led to hopes in Kingston penitentiary that the new government would change conditions in the prison. However, the new Trudeau government to counter criticism that it was "soft on crime" made conditions in the prisons even harsher. For an example, starting in 1948, the prisoners were permitted to write for and publish a magazine, KP Telescope, which allowed the lesser educated prisoners to learn how to read and write. In 1969, the Trudeau government abolished KP Telescope under the grounds that the prisoners did not need a magazine to read. The prisoners were not allowed to bring in magazines and the loss of KP Telescope was much resented as depriving the prisoners of their main reading material. The combination of a Liberal government whose rhetoric promised a "Just Society" for all vs. the steadily more harsher conditions at Kingston penitentiary made for a volatile mood in the prison.

Caron charged that the lack of recreational programs was the main reason for the riot as he wrote, "Kingston Penitentiary was one of the few federal institutions that still insisted on keeping the prisoners dead-locked in cages for as long as eighteen hours a day for no better reason than punishment". By the fall of 1970, more and more prisoners were punished by being sent to solitary confinement as the overcrowding at the prison led to tensions between the prisoners, which were often resolved by making accusations to the Warden, Arthur Jarvis, of being "trouble-makers". The increasing use of solitary confinement as a discipline tool in 1970-1971 led to an increase in suicides at the prison as many prisoners could not face solitary confinement anymore. It also led to an angry mood with many of the prisoners willing to risk all by lashing out against a system that they believed to be oppressing them. On 18 January 1971, Jarvis wrote to Paul Faguy, the commissioner of penitentiaries, where he warned, "There is a high degree of tension at Kingston Penitentiary at this time. In fact it appears to be almost at the point of explosion". Jarvis complained that Kingston penitentiary was overcrowded, there were shortages of guards and many of the inmates feared that new prison of Millhaven would be more harsh, making for a volatile mood. In 1963, the federal government started construction of a new prison at Millhaven to replace Kingston Penitentiary, which was intended to be a high-technology prison that would be impossible to escape from that would house 1,350 inmates. Rumors were rift at Kingston Penitentiary that the new prison of Millhaven, which was intended to be opened later in 1971, would be more harsh than Kingston Penitentiary.

The most hated prisoners at Kingston Penitentiary were the "undesirables" (a term used by both the guards and prisoners) held in the 1-D range. The "undesirables" in the 1-D range were generally child molesters, rapists, child killers and police informers. However, there were exceptions, Richard Moore was not a sex offender, but rather a 21-year old automobile thief in Port Coquitlam who had received an 18-month sentence in prison for stealing a car in 1968. After an escape attempt in 1969, Moore had received six years in prison and was sent to Kingston penitentiary. As Moore was a very attractive young man, many of the other prisoners at Kingston penitentiary had wanted to rape him, which led him to ask in February 1970 to transferred to the 1-D range for his own safety as he was afraid to use the communal showers. Because Moore lived in the 1-D wing, he was widely assumed to be a child molester. Within the general population of Kingston Penitentiary, younger prisoners, especially those considered physically attractive, were known as "sweet kids" who were given the option of becoming the lover of an older prisoner known as a "wolf" who would provide him with cigarettes, chocolates and protection from the other prisoners in exchange for sex. A "wolf" prisoner was generally heterosexual outside of prison, but homosexual inside prison. A "sweet kid" who refused the offer to become the lover of a "wolf" was considered to be fair game and would be beaten and/or raped for their defiance. Rape is an act of violence, not sex, and as such the general population prisoners at Kingston Penitentiary despite their hatred of rapist prisoners would engage in rape as a form of domination against weaker prisoners. The best known "wolf" at Kingston Penitentiary in 1971 was Harold St. Amour who served as the resident bookie for illegal gambling, which made him a relatively well off prisoner, who used his wealth to purchase several "sweet Kids". One of St. Amour's lovers was Ralph Lake, an young man convicted of rape who was placed under St. Amour's protection, allowing Lake to work as a mailroom clerk despite living in the 1-D range.

== Riot begins ==
William "Billy" Knight, the prison barber, had starting planning an uprising to protest conditions at Kingston penitentiary sometime in March 1971. At 10:30 pm, 14 April 1971, the bell rang which indicated that the prisoners were to leave the recreational hall and return to their cells. Knight along with his followers Brian Doge, Charles Saunders, Robert Adams, Allan Lafreniere and Leo Barrieault took their places in the line-up together. Knight was held in the 4-B range, but the other prisoners who joined them in the line-up had swapped places with inmates from different ranges. When one of the guards, Terry Decker, having noticed that Knight's shirt was not tucked in, he ordered Knight to tuck it in. Knight who feared that his plan was coming apart, punched Decker in the stomach. Knight shouted "That's the last fucking order you're going to give!" Saunders seized the keys from Decker while Dodge, Barrieault, Lafreniere and Adams raced into the dome before the guards shut the gate. Dodge tackled a guard, Donald Flynn while Lafreniere attacked another guard Ed Barrett. One guard, Joseph Vallier, froze up with fear and did nothing. Another two guards, Douglas Dale and Kerry Bushell, were overpowered and taken hostage. Within a few minutes, Knight's followers had seized control of the dome and taken Barret, Vallier, Flynn, Dale, Bushell and Decker hostage. Using the keys he seized, Knight started to open all of the cells. Knight, who had a Messiah complex, gave a speech saying: "Brothers! Our time has come to shake off the shackles. We've taken control of the dome and we've got six hostages. You will all be released from your cells".

The first act of the prisoners was to smash the much hated bell. An attempt to take control of the kitchen was unsuccessful and the inmates turned back after a guard fired a warning shot with his shotgun. The hostages were moved to a safe location. Caron wrote, "They knew the value of healthy pawns, knew that without them the authorities were certain to machine-gun their way inside the main cellblock, a dreadful outcome that would have left a lot of people dead". To keep order, Knight created an inmate "police force". Assigned to the inmate police were Brian Beaucage, Barrie MacKenzie and Wayne Ford. Caron wrote that Beaucage, McKenzie and Ford were the three toughest prisoners at Kingston penitentiary who were all "natural leaders" and were "not to be fucked with" by the other inmates. Knight in a speech rejected calls to kill the hostages, saying, "Brothers! Brothers! Let's not give the pigs the satisfaction of finding a reason to label us as animals to the world. We need the public's support and we won't get it by creating a bloodbath." Upon hearing of the riot, Jarvis ordered all off-duty guards to return and for the guards to be armed with rifles and shotguns from the prison amoury. Jarvis went to the Keeper's Hall where he spoke on the telephone with Knight. In a tense stand-off in the gymnasium, Knight met with Jarvis and demanded that he allow the prisoners in the gymnasium who had forced against the wall at gunpoint to be allowed to return to the dome, saying that otherwise he would kill one of the hostages. Jarvis accepted Knight's demand and all 64 prisoners in the gymnasium were allowed to return.

One 1-D range prisoner who expressed much fear of the uprising was Brian Ensor, known as "the Camel" to the other prisoners. Ensor was an immature man of "subnormal intelligence" and a pedophile. Ensor, a child-like man who seemed incapable of understanding why it was wrong to be sexually attracted to children, was serving a life sentence for raping two young girls, both under the age of 10, after he was convicted in 1962. Two psychiatrists testified at this trial that Ensor was unable to control his sexual urges against children and would rape again if released. Two prisoners chased after Ensor and tried to throw him to his death from the third floor. Ensor was saved by McKenzie who told the two men to stop and as McKenzie was a prisoner whom no-one wanted to fight, the two men released him. Knight and McKenzie forced Ensor into a cell for his own protection. Ensor kept crying and screaming that he did not want to be at Kingston penitentiary and was afraid for his life, leading Knight and McKenzie to tell him to stay in his cell for his own safety.

The prisoners celebrated their freedom by going on an orgy of destruction and vandalism. The prisoners in the 1-D range, which housed the child molesters, were markedly afraid of being killed by the other inmates. Knight ordered that the 1-D prisoners be left alone, but several prisoners ignored him and flooded the 1-D range with a fire hose. The prisoners had been forced to attend church services every Sunday morning and the Protestant and Catholic chapels in Kingston penitentiary were sacked and smashed up with a particular venom. The prisoners had long wanted to subscribe to the Playboy pornographic magazine, but the Catholic prison chaplain had successfully lobbied the Crown to make Playboy illegal in Kingston penitentiary under the grounds that it would "rot" minds and "lead to masturbation". For this reason, the Catholic chapel was smashed with a special ferocity.

== Negotiations ==
On the morning of 15 April, Knight met again with Jarvis to demand that he provide the inmates with food and coffee, saying that otherwise he could not guarantee the lives of the hostages. The guards taken hostage had to sleep on the floor in a cold and damp cell while being kept awake by the constant clanging of metal bars across the railings, which was a recurring theme of the riot as the inmates loved the sound of metal clanging across metal. Of the hostages, Donald Flynn, a guard hated by the prisoners, was convinced that he would be killed at any moment. Joseph Vallier, a married man with five children, was likewise in a state of hysteria at the prospect of his murder. Terry Decker was consumed with guilt as the keys to the cells had been taken from him. Kerry Bushell, who was just married, was convinced that he would never see his wife, Elaine, again. Ed Barrret, the oldest and the most experienced of the guards taken hostage, was fearful that he would die of a heart attack caused by the stress of being taken hostage.

Maloney insisted on being allowed to speak to a hostage as he wanted to know that the hostages were indeed alive. The hostage Ed Barrett was placed on the phone with Maloney. Barret was then allowed to speak to his wife who at first refused to believe she was speaking to her husband and screamed "you've killed my husband!" as her husband's voice had become faint. Finally, Barrett described their daughter's bedroom, which led his wife to exclaim "my husband's alive!" Knight then allowed Jarvis to speak with Barrett who advised accepting the demands, saying he and the other hostages were being well treated, but that could easily change. Barrett stated that Knight would order the murders of the hostages if his demands were not met, leading for Knight to take the phone and say, "think about what you heard." Knight placed a phone call to a journalist, Gerry Retzer, to announce that he was now in control of the prison. At 10:45 am, Knight hosted a press conference where he read out his demands to the media. Knight told the media, "We're sick of being zombies!" Knight demanded that a citizens committee be formed to mediate the crisis, saying that he did not trust the Crown to negotiate in good faith. Both Faguy, and the Solicitor-General, Jean-Pierre Goyer, rejected the demand for a citizens committee. Henry Champ, a television reporter from Toronto along his camera crew were allowed by Knight to enter the prison. After touring the prison, Champ reported that the hostages were not being abused and "it was like a school without teachers". Fearing for the lives of the hostages, the Crown reversed itself on the question of a citizens committee. Some of the people requested for the citizens' committee were unrealistic such as the actor Paul Newman and the boxer Muhammad Ali. The committee consisted of Desmond Morton, a feisty Irish immigrant who served as a law professor at the University of Toronto; Ron Haggart, the crime correspondent of the Toronto Telegram newspaper; Aubrey Golden, a Toronto lawyer and a columnist for the Daily Toronto Star newspaper; Arthur Martin, a noted Toronto lawyer; and William Donkin a lawyer from York Region.

In Ottawa, Goyer along with the deputy solicitor-general, Ernest Côté, briefed the cabinet. The Prime Minister, Pierre Trudeau, had just married Margaret Sinclair and was on his honeymoon in the West Indies. The acting prime minister, Edgar Benson, chaired the meeting in the absence of Trudeau. Côté told the cabinet that the hostages were not in danger at present, but the prisoners would almost certainly kill the hostages if any attempt was made to storm Kingston penitentiary. Goyer was especially opposed to the citizens committee and above all to Haggart, whom he noted was the crime correspondent for the Conservative Toronto Telegram that was stoutly opposed to the Liberal Trudeau government. Goyer believed that Haggart would use the crisis in some way to embarrass the Trudeau government and wanted Haggart removed from the citizens' committee. Goyer spoke in favor of the rejection of Knight's demands and recommended the use of force to end the uprising. The cabinet agreed to deploy the Canadian Army and that if the uprising had not ended by noon on 18 April, the Army would storm the prison. The cabinet gave permission for the soldiers of the Royal Canadian Regiment to use lethal force and to shoot to kill if any resistance was encountered.

Goyer wanted a group of prison guards armed with shotguns to storm the prison at once, saying the prisoners would not kill the hostages if confronted by force, but his advice was rejected by the cabinet under the grounds that time was needed to provide a peaceful resolution for the crisis. Six months before, in October 1970 during the October Crisis the Trudeau government had invoked the War Measures Act, which suspended all civil liberties and the freedom of the press in Canada and led to the military being deployed on the streets of Ottawa, Montreal and Quebec City. Goyer was keen on a military solution to the crisis to prove that the government treated all challenges to authority equally and feared that to not use force at Kingston Penitentiary would lead to accusations that the Trudeau government was anti-Quebec.

The citizens committee met with Knight and told him that his demand for total immunity for all those involved in the riot was unrealistic. Donkin promised that the committee would ensure that if anyone were charged as a result of their actions, he would ensure that they would be represented by good lawyers. Haggart and Martin were flown to Ottawa abroad a Canadian Army helicopter to meet with Goyer and Côté. Goyer told Haggart and Martin that the Crown would not grant any pardons and that Knight would have to drop that demand. On the evening of 16 April, the soldiers of the Royal Canadian Regiment were deployed outside of Kingston penitentiary and placed a barbed wire fence around the prison along with snipers with orders to shoot to kill should any inmates attempt to escape.

In his 1985 memoir of the riot, Bingo!, Caron emphatically denied the claims made by the media at the time that there was a massive number of homosexual gang rapes during the riot as he declared: "No rapes occurred during the riot. Any convict caught committing such an act would have been torn apart by the prison population in much the same fashion as an undesirable [prisoner slang for a child molester] would have been treated. Of course there was sex during the riot, but only among willing parties. If a blanket was hung over the door of a cell you didn't go in". Caron wrote that: "Two notorious drag queens wasted no time in settling up business on the first floor of B-block by closing off the front of their drums [cells] with blankets". The news media ran stories that accused the rioting prisoners of "unbelievable atrocities". Caron wrote that from listening to their transistor radios that: "When we heard all the ugly lies of sodomy and mutilation over the radio a lot of convicts became so enraged that they wanted to cut the tongues out of the hostages so that their comrades really would have reason to wag theirs".

The citizens committee met again with Knight, whose patently unrealistic demands soon began to annoy them. Knight's grandiose sense of his own self-importance and an unwillingness to compromise as he preferred to grandstand made a poor impression on the committee. By contrast, the committee came to have much respect for McKenzie, whose common sense and cool, calm demeanor impressed them. During the talks, McKenzie snapped at Knight: "We don't want your ping-pong prizes. Most of your grievances are silly. The object is to get the guys out of here". McKenzie forced Knight to concede that there would be no amnesty, but in exchange promised the citizens committee that he would have the hostages freed in exchange for prisoners not being transferred to Millhaven. The citizens committee spoke with John Maloney, the regional director of prisons in eastern Ontario, who agreed to accept McKenzie's terms. The citizens committee believed that the crisis would end, but were undercut by a speech that Goyer gave where he announced that the Crown would not make any deals with Knight. The prisoners' were aware of Goyer's speech by listening to their transistor radios.

== Turn towards violence ==
Knight made a speech, but was rudely interrupted by Beaucage who stormed onto the stage to scream at Knight, "you're full of shit!" The incident marked the collapse of Knight's authority. MacKenzie wanted to surrender to save lives, but was opposed by Beaucage who preferred a bloodbath. Caron wrote about Beaucage's demands that, "What was building up inside the dome was a mass suicide pact orchestrated by the insane element."

In an attempt to build trust, Morton visited the prison and issued a statement for the media that declared "the hostages are safe, in good health and are not being threatened". The frequent claims being made in the media that the inmates were engaged in physical and sexual abuse of the hostages led to intense public pressure that the Royal Canadian Regiment storm the penitentiary and Morton's statement was intended to defuse such demands. Goyer who was intent upon a military solution to the crisis vetoed Morton's statement being issued to the media. When the prison guards started to hack at the barricaded wooden door to create an opening for a fire hose in case the inmates should set fire to the prison, the inmates assumed it was the beginning of an assault. The cry went out "the army is coming! the army is coming!" and the inmates began to prepare a defense by smashing the lightbulbs, picking up their makeshift weapons', and placed mattresses against the door. MacKenzie admonished the inmates as he shouted: "For fuck's sake, you guys better get with it or a lot of us are going to die".

MacKenzie advised the inmates that it was time to surrender as it was only a matter before the Royal Canadian Regiment stormed the prison, and given that the soldiers had guns while the inmates did not, such a battle could only end with a massive loss of life. At that point, David Shepley shouted with a megaphone: "Nobody is giving up the pigs! No more talking, it's time to fight! We're calling the shots from now on. Ain't nobody giving up!" Standing next to Shepley was Beaucage, who menacingly had a steel pipe in his hand. MacKenzie went to meet the citizens committee, saying the mood was very dangerous in the prison as Shepley and Beacuage were on the brink of doing something reckless and that he needed a concession to sell the other inmates on surrender.

Taking advantage of MacKenzie's absence, Shepley shouted "the fun is about to begin!" and led a group into the 1-B range with the intention of killing the hostages. The hostages were guarded by the 6'3 Ford, an inmate that no-one wanted to fight. Instead, Beaucage, Shepley and a number of other prisoners turned their attention to the inmates of the 1-D range. The inmates of the 1-D range were dragged out tied into chairs and placed in a circle. Three of the 1-D prisoners, namely Ralph Lake, Melvin Travis, and Ron McCorkel were found hiding in St. Amour's cell. Shepley and his followers seized Travis and McCorkel while Lake ran down the hallway, but was captured by Beaucage.

Beaucage organized a kangaroo court that sentenced 16 "undesirable" prisoners to death. The "master of the ceremonies" was Shepley who used a megaphone to ask of the assembled prisoners "what shall we do gentleman?" and received such replies as "castrate them!" and "kill them!" On the night of 17–18 April 1971, the "undesirables" were tied to chairs, had their heads covered with bedsheets and under Beaucage's orders were beaten bloody by his followers. Beaucage personally broke the noses of all 16 of the "undesirables" as the beginning of the torture session. Under his orders, his followers beat the condemned men with their fists, metal bars, hammers and anything else that would inflict pain, which caused the area under the dome to be soaked in their pools of their blood. Beaucage himself used a makeshift weapon, a wooden board with a protruding nail hammered through it to attack the "undesirables" tied into their chairs. Caron wrote that "the cruellest of the lot" were Edward Fowler and Robert Robidioux who both "handsome and likeable nineteen-year-olds" who were seen as homosexual "sweet kids" to be sexually exploited by the older prisoners. Carton stated that both Fowler and Robidioux resented their 'sweet kid' image and wanted "to create a macho image in place of the "sweet kids" image they hated". Likewise, Carton wrote that Harold St. Amour, an older homosexual prisoner who was known as the patron of the "sweet kids" had decided to change his "joint man" image by joining the gang that tortured the prisoners. St. Amour attacked with an iron bar his lover Ralph Lake who as a rapist was considered to be an "undesirable", causing Lake to scream in horror as the man who had been his lover a few hours before was now trying to kill him. A black prisoner, Melvin Travis, was singled out for an especially vicious beating by Beaucage because he was convicted of raping a white woman. Travis could barely breathe because his nose had been broken into two places, but was saved by another black prisoner whom Caron wrote was "a young and popular homosexual" who argued on his behalf as he stated that Travis was his lover and he had been wrongly convicted.

One of the prisoners tied in the circle and beaten bloody, Richard Moore, later testified at the trial of the "Kingston 13" that he was in immense pain and his vision was clouded as too much of his own blood oozed over his eyes. To add to his discomfort, his head was dosed in lacquer from the wood workshop while Shepley suggested that Moore be burned alive. Beaucage vetoed that suggestion as he stated that Moore needed to be tortured more. One of Beaucage's friends, Robbie Robidoux, cheerfully inquired of Moore how many ribs there were in the human body; when Moore replied that he could not know the answer to that question, Robidoux responded by saying that he did not know either and he was about to find out as he was going to break all of Moore's ribs. Robidoux then used a metal bar to break one by one all of Moore's ribs. Moore remembered that besides for the pain that it was nearly impossible for him to breathe as his ribs were smashed in and his lungs were crushed. Moore felt for certain that he was going to die that night and prayed for death as deliverance from the pain as he struggled to breathe while the other inmates continued to hit him with metal bars. At the trial later in 1971 Moore testified that about St. Amour that: "He looked like he hated what he was doing. I thought he might in some danger". Caron wrote that Moore's face had become "...a grotesque mask of battered flesh, so bloody that he looked something out of a nightmare". Another of the inmates tortured in the circle, Thomas Malone, described a shower of blows along with his body cut up with razor blades. The men then urinated into Malone's gashes to add to his pain.

One of the inmates who witnessed the torture session, an American bank robber, James Brawley, who had robbed a bank in Toronto in 1970, testified at the trial of the "Kingston 13" that the hoods were placed over the condemned men to confuse the soldiers outside as the soldiers would not know if the men under the hoods were the hostages or not. Brawley testified about the beatings: "There was so much blood". Brawley added that after what he had seen in Kington Penitentiary that he intended to return to Florida once his sentence in Canada was complete, saying he had never seen such savagery before. Brawley also testified that Goyer's speech had led to the torture session as he stated: "The guys doing the beatings felt they had nothing to lose because we'd all be dead once the Army forced their way in". Lake testified at the trial that was beaten by the Oag brothers, Donald and James, for about 20 minutes, and despite the way that St. Amour had attacked him earlier, saved his life. Lake stated that St. Amour had told the Oag brothers "don't touch this man anymore, we're saving him for something else", an order that he stated had saved his life as the Oag brothers followed St. Amour's orders. Lake testified that he had the impression that St. Amour had joined the gang that tortured the prisoners out of the fear that he would be tortured if he did not join in. Another witness at the trial, Denis Robertson, testified that he saw Glen "Yankee" Morris strike a prisoner with an iron bar, saying: "He was just going back and forth across the guy's scalp. He looked like a man cutting grass with a scythe. It you're going to kill a guy, just kill him".

To the tune of blaring rock music, a child molester, Brian Ensor, was beaten very brutally and finally had his throat slashed by Robidoux with a homemade knife. Beaucage displayed his sadism as he watched in enjoyment as Ensor screamed and sobbed in pain under the shower of blows to his body while his hood was soaked in his blood. One prisoner-later identified at the trial as Glen Morris-used a chalice taken from the Catholic chapel to drink the blood of Ensor and toasted him by saying "Here's to you sucker! Time for you to die!" Caron who watched Ensor being killed wrote about the murder that he saw "...young Bobby [Robidoux], stoned out of his mind, talked to the corpse as though it still contained life, cursing and kicking it, In a further act of savagery he stooped down, dug his fingers into a hole in the dead man's forehead, and plucked out some brains! With a satanic laugh the boy wiped is hands on his hockey sweater and disappeared into a nearly wing like an actor leaving the stage." The next prisoner to be killed was Bertrand Robert, a man who had slowly boiled his five children via his hot stove burner, who was beaten with metal pipes with the prisoners told him: "That's for boiling your kids!" Although not a child molester, the coroner's report showed that all five of Robert's children had suffered extreme physical abuse which along with the sadistic method of killing his own children had made Robert one of the most hated men in Kingston Penitentiary. To put a stop to the impeding massacre as Beaucage was intent upon torturing and killing all of the "undesirables", MacKenzie, who had returned to the 4-B wing, agreed to release the hostages.

== End ==
To put a stop to what was threatening to become a massacre, McKenzie decided to release the hostages early on the morning of 18 April 1971. Without the hostages, the prisoners would be forced to surrender. McKenzie called Haggart to ask him: "How much do we have to make a decision?" Haggart replied "until 5:15 am", and then corrected himself by saying: "you have to make a decision by 5 am. You've got to be ready to release the hostages immediately and come out when ordered". McKenzie answered: "We need more time. We're not on the same wavelength in here". McKenzie demanded that Haggart give him a promise that the inmates would not be beaten by the guards if they surrendered and then hung up.

At 5: 07 am, McKenzie called Haggart again to ask him: "How much longer do we have?" Haggart did not know that the Army would assault the prison at noon that day. Haggart watched as the sun was starting to rise in the east and told McKenzie: "It's dawn and the army always attacks at dawn". Haggart later admitted that he was bluffing as: "I made it up. I had no idea what the war plan was for invading the penitentiary and I still do not know." McKenzie asked for more time as some of the other inmates still did not want to release the hostages, but was told by Haggart: "I can't guarantee what will happen in the next half-hour. I suggest in the next two minutes you get a decision". Haggart heard McKenzie shout to the other inmates: "you guys have two minutes to make up your fucking minds!" McKenzie then told Haggart he would be releasing the hostages in exchange for a promise that the guards would not beat the prisoners if they surrendered.

Once it was known that the hostages were to be released, the prisoners all wanted to surrender at once before the Royal Canadian Regiment stormed the prison as the prisoners were convinced the soldiers would massacre them without the hostages. A scene of pandemonium ensured as hundreds of prisoners attempted to rush out of the front gate to surrender to be confronted by Morton and a squad of soldiers with bayonets drawn. Morton shouted in his Irish-accented English: "Come forward one at a time, one at a time!" When the inmates tried to press forward as a group, the soldiers fired warning shots into the air. Haggart who was still on the phone with MacKenzie told him "don't go into the corridor". MacKenzie shouted "tell the fucking screws to back off", but Haggart assured him "they're holding their fire". Haggart told MacKenzie that it was time to release the hostage to calm the situation down. Goyer, who had arrived in Kingston, told Haggart "tell them we want to see our first hostage now". At 6 am, MacKenzie personally walked out the first hostage to be freed, who was Bushell, who was promptly embraced by his wife. To prevent beatings, MacKenzie told Haggart that he would release one hostage for every sixty prisoners, a demand that Goyer rejected as the solicitor-general wanted all of the hostages freed at once. When McKenzie refused that demand, Goyer eventually accepted McKenzie's terms. Over the course of the next hour, the hostages were released one by one while the prisoners all surrendered in groups.

The last prisoner to surrender was McKenzie who was greeted by Haggart and Goyer as he walked out. Haggart went up to shake McKenzie's hand and told him: "Thank you, Barrie. You are a great man!". McKenzie refused to shake Haggart's hand and replied: "Fuck off! I didn't do it for you. I did it for the guys in there". A number of university students from Queen's University and the University of Toronto had arrived to cheer on the prisoners as heroes while carrying signs that read "Justice for the Prisoners!" and "We Support Prisoners!". The Kingston police, the Ontario Provincial Police, and the soldiers told the students that they had to leave because they were trespassing on federal property.

== Aftermath ==
The promises that the prisoners would not be sent to Millhaven and would not be beaten were not honored by the Crown. The prisoners from Kingston Penitentiary were immediately sent to Millhaven where the guards beat them all bloody as soon they arrived. Knight as the leader of the uprising was singled out for by the Millhaven guards for an especially vicious beating that left his skull fractured.

In a self-congratulatory speech to the House of Commons on 19 April 1971, Goyer took all the credit for ending the crisis and told the House that there was "no deal and no conditions". Goyer denied that the prisoners had any motive for the uprising and claimed the riot was simply an outburst of mindless violence. Goyer also announced that a Royal Commission under Justice J.W. Swackhammer would examine the riot and advise him of ways to prevent a reoccurrence. Haggart wrote in the Toronto Telegram: "In truth, the plan for releasing hostages 'from time to time' originated as much with responsible inmates as with anyone. Without naming names, it would not have hurt the minister to say so." On the same day, Golden of the citizens committee told the Toronto media in a press conference: "The hero of the Kingston Penitentiary riot is a prisoner named Barrie MacKenzie...MacKenzie went back in there alone and negotiated all night long. He risked his life going back in there and he prevented a bloodbath". Morton told the press conference that MacKenzie was a hero and stated when MacKenzie agreed to return to the prison on the last night of the riot it was like a scene out of a Western film. Morton stated: "He said, "I'm off". I thought he would get the last hostage out but we would never see him again. I thought he was going to his death". By contrast, Morton harshly criticized Goyer as he stated that the citizens' committee had a deal with Knight to end the uprising peacefully, which was undermined by Goyer going on the radio to say that the Crown would not make a deal with Knight. Morton stated that "Goyer blew it!" as he argued that it was only when Knight's authority collapsed after Goyer's speech that the radical prisoner faction led by Beaucage went on the torture and murder session of the "undesirables".

On 30 April 1971, the Ontario Attorney General Allan Lawrence ordered an investigation into the allegations that the guards of Millhaven had beaten the prisoners' from Kingston Penitentiary on 18–19 April 1971, which was the first investigation of this type in Canada. On 27 May 1971, 11 Millhaven guards were charged by the Ontario Provincial Police with 24 counts of assault causing bodily harm. In the House of Commons, Goyer announced that the federal government would not fire the Millhaven guards charged with assault and would pay for their defense lawyers. The prisoners who had taken the guards hostage on the first night of the riot on 14 April 1971 were charged with kidnapping on 4 June 1971. Charged were William James Knight, Charles Saunders, James Adams, Allan Lafreniere, Leo Joseph, Paul Barrieault and Brian Dodge. On 20 July 1971 for the first time ever in Canadian history prison guards were brought to a preliminary hearing (the Canadian equivalent of an American grand jury) for assaulting inmates with 11 guards from Millhaven being accused of assault. The hearing ended with Justice Donald Graham ruling that the Crown had presented sufficient evidence to bring 8 of the 11 accused guards to trial for assault.

On 17 August 1971, all of the prisoners charged with kidnapping except for Knight made plea bargains with the Crown where they pleaded guilty to the lesser charge of forcible seizure which entitled only a five-year prison sentence; by contrast a conviction for kidnapping in Canada in 1971 meant an automatic life sentence. At the preliminary hearing for Knight, the Crown asked for the guards taken hostage to identify Knight as the leader of the uprising. Knight had changed his appearance by growing his hair long and though he did not need glasses, he wore glasses at his preliminary hearing. The first hostage to testify, Terry Decker, was unable to point out Knight in the courtroom when asked to do so. Other guards taken hostage such as William Babcock, Douglas Dale and Joseph Vallier were likewise unable to identify Knight as being the courtroom. The presiding judge, Justice Donald Graham, dismissed the charges against Knight under the grounds that the Crown had failed to establish he was the man who taken the guards hostage.

On 28 October 1971, the trial of the prisoners responsible for the torture-murder session whom the newspapers dubbed the "Kingston 13" began with Justice William Henderson as the presiding judge. Charged with first degree murder were William David Shepley, Glen Archer Morris, Wayne Herbert McGurgin, Edward Maxwell Fowler, Harold Kenneth St. Amour, James Robert Oag, his younger brother Donald Oag, Ernest James Bugler, David Silvester Birt, Edward Fulton Johnston, Brian William Doge, Robert James Robidoux and Brian Lester Beaucage. All of the accused pleaded not guilty. The trial of the "Kingston 13" attracted immense media attention and the courtroom was full of university students who wanted to show their support for the "Kingston 13". Justice Henderson was displeased with the causal hippie appearance of the students and stated that his courtroom would "not be a haven for bums", saying that he only would allow young people "properly" dressed to attend the trial. The trial featured extremely graphic testimony about the torture session with an American bank robber James Brawley testifying for the Crown he had never seen such brutality, saying: "They started beating them, breaking their noses and tormenting them. There was so much blood". Brawley testified that he had seen Beaucage, Shepley, Robidoux, Morris and Fowler along with other prisoners whose names he did not know torture the "undesirables". When Brawley testified that one of the "undesirables" being tortured was a black man whom he referred to as "the Negro", a defense lawyer argued that the correct term was black, leading for Brawley to say he was from Florida and had many "Negro friends". Justice Henderson finally had to tell the defense lawyer to change his line of questioning, saying that this question of semantics was taking up too much time. One witness described how Robidoux used a fire hose to pump water down the noses of the "undesirables", saying that he enjoyed the pain he had inflicted. Another witness for the Crown, a bank robber, Edward Patricks, testified that he saw Robidoux torture two of the "undesirables" with a knife in such a vicious manner that he had to flee into his cell as he could not stand what he was watching. Another witness for the Crown, a bank robber from British Columbia, John Zelinsky, testified: "What they did was sickening, utterly sickening. This wasn't a riot. I've been in a riot. This was a torture chamber. People were beating people up for no reason at all. I say all these people are guilty and they should pay for it". Moore who had barely survived the torture session gave graphic testimony about what it was like to have his ribs broken and to almost suffocate to death with his collapsed lungs while he was being continually beaten with iron bars. The journalist Catherine Fogarty stated that she was greatly "disturbed" by the account of the torture session in Caron's memoir, but discovered from the trial transcripts that "everything he said in the book about what happened was true".

During the trial, Justice Henderson arranged for secret talks between the Crown attorney prosecuting the "Kingston 13" case and the defense lawyers for the "Kingston 13", saying he wanted this case to be ended with plea bargains, which was a departure from the normal role played by judges. On 18–19 November 1971, a secret meeting was held in a cheap motel attended by the two Crown attorneys, 16 defense lawyers and Justice Henderson who pressured both sides to reach a deal for plea bargains. On 22 November 1971, the trial came to a sudden halt with the Crown making plea bargains where 12 of the accused pleaded guilty to manslaughter while Beaucage pleaded guilty to assault causing bodily harm. In a speech to the jury urging them to accept the plea bargains, Henderson stated that the victims of the torture-murder session were child molesters, rapists and child killers and that the mere sight of such "undesirables" led to an understandable urge for the accused to want to torture them, but he claimed that there was no evidence that the accused had planned to kill the "undesirables". The jury accepted Henderson's recommendation to accept the plea bargains. The plea bargains along with Henderson's statement that the victims of the torture-session had gotten what they deserved and that the actions of the "Kingston 13" were essentially justified were controversial in 1971 and have remained so. When sentencing Morris, the prisoner whom several of the Crown's witnesses accused of drinking the blood of Ensor, Henderson asked of him "You'll be a good boy from now on?" The outcome of the "Kingston 13" trial was widely viewed as a miscarriage of justice with a group of men who had beaten two men to death and tortured a number of others receiving very light sentences while the presiding judge had stated that the accused were some sort of heroes for their actions. On 13 December 1971, the journalist Michael Valpy of the Globe & Mail revealed that the plea bargains had been brokered in secret by Henderson, which increased the controversy as judges are expected to be impartial rather taking the lead in negotiating plea bargains. The plea bargains became the object of debate in the House of Commons with the former Conservative prime minister John Diefenbaker telling the House: "Normally I do not believe in harsh sentences. But in this case there are fears in penitentiaries across Canada that the sentences are so light as to constitute an invitation on the part of inmates to follow the same course of action taken by those in Kingston". The Liberal justice minister, John Turner, in response to Diefenbaker's questions stated that the federal government did not intend to appeal the verdicts in the "Kingston 13" case.

On 10 December 1971, the Millhaven guards were brought to trial with Knight serving as the Crown's star witness. The trial ended on 16 December 1971 with the acquittal of all the guards. On the first anniversary of the riot in April 1972, Haggart who was working for the Globe & Mail (the Toronto Telegram went bankrupt in October 1971) wrote a retrospective on the riot. One prisoner known as "George" to protect his identity whom Haggart interviewed told him that watching the torture session had changed his life as he could not face prison again, saying: "I just can't go back to prison...They looked like they were all dead and the floor was full of blood. We just sat there waiting for daylight, waiting for the Army to come. We didn't care anymore....Those punks thought they were tough-kicking, beating and burning helpless, half-dead men-but they were cowards. Then I realized all of us who were watching, afraid to step in and stop it, were cowards too." "George" told Haggart that watching the torture session had made him vomit in disgust and despite being a career bank robber that he was giving up his life of crime as he still had nightmares about what he had seen.

On 24 April 1972, a Royal Commission under Justice J.W. Swackhammer presented a report to Goyer that blamed the riot on an overcrowded and aging prison along with the federal government's policy of ending privileges such as sports events and sports teams, saying the policy of forcing prisoners to stay in their cells for 16 hours a day was the root cause of the riot. The part of the Swackhammer report which stated that Warden John D. Clark along with other senior officials at Millhaven Institute had ordered the beatings of the Kingston prisoners on 18–19 April 1971 was censored by the government, and the report's recommendation that the senior Millhaven officials be fired was not acted upon. Other aspects of the Swackhammer report such as creating an ombudsmen to handle prisoner complaints and abolishing corporal punishment in Canadian prisons were acted upon. The 1971 riot was the "seminal event" in the history of Canadian prisons as it inspired other prisoners to riot and the 1970s were the most violent decade in Canadian prisons with 69 prison riots breaking out over the next decade, which proved to be a record. The Kingston riot did not change the policies of the Trudeau government with a committee of 11 MPs appointed by Trudeau himself writing in a report presented in October 1976 that the Canadian prisons were "a national disgrace". The report stated that there was a "near-total breakdown of order" in the prisons with physical and sexual violence being rampant. The report quoted a prisoner as saying of Millhaven: "Kingston of 1971 hasn't gone away, it's just moved down the road". The approach of the Trudeau government in general was not seek reforms to prisons, but rather to spend more money on repressive measures such as using the new technology of security cameras which were installed in every prison hallway to make it difficult for the prisoners to riot. Kingston Penitentiary was closed decades after its planned date of closure in 1971 on 30 September 2013. Today, Kingston Penitentiary is now a museum and one of the most popular aspects of the museum are the exhibits relating to riot including walking over the area under the dome where the kangaroo court held its session.

The Canadian journalist Grant Buckler wrote that it was primarily MacKenzie and Haggart who deserved the credit for ending the crisis peacefully without the prison being stormed. Buckler noted that later that same year, in September 1971, the Attica Prison riot ended with the deaths of 43 men, the majority of whom were killed by the troopers of the New York state police. Buckler argued that had the order being given to storm Kingston penitentiary, that something similar might had happened as the hostages would have been killed along with a number of the prisoners. Forgarty stated in 2021: "What he [MacKenzie] and Ron Haggart did on that final night saved the prison from becoming another Attica". Buckler argued that the Kingston Penitentiary riot was notable for what did not happen just as much as what did happen as MacKenzie and Haggart were able to prevent something similar to what occurred at Attica later that year.

== See also ==
- List of incidents of civil unrest in Canada
