= Wayne Ford (criminal) =

Canadian criminal

Wayne Ford (born 9 June 1946), better as "Big Wayne" is a Canadian criminal whose matricide is one of the best known murders committed in Toronto. Ford served as one of the leaders of the 1971 Kingston Penitentiary riot.

== Matricide ==
Ford was born into wealthy, upper-middle-class family in Toronto, the only child of Lorne and Minne Ford. In a 2013 interview, Ford stated he came from a good, loving family and described his upbringing as: "I had good parents, lived in suburbia, and did all the stereotypical Leave It To Beaver shit". Despite his upbringing, Ford started to shop lift comics and candy from the age of 8 onward as he found himself enjoying rule-breaking. From the age of 14 onward, Ford started to steal automobiles. As a teenager, Ford grew to be abnormally tall and strong as he was 6'3 by the age of 14. On the account of his height, Ford was able to visit bars and served alcohol out of the mistaken belief that he over the age of 21. Ford came to associate with the Para-Dice Riders outlaw biker gang and was offered membership. When was 16, his father died, which ended the one restraining force on him.

On 18 May 1963, Ford murdered his mother Minnie. Ford had damaged the family car in an accident, and when his mother expressed anger at him, he beat her to death. Ford dragged his mother's corpse down to the basement and proceeded to repaint all of the walls and floors of his house in an effort to hide evidence. Ford along with two friends dumped the corpse into Lake Couchiching. Ford told everyone that his mother was on vacation in Florida.

The disappearance of Minnie Ford attracted much media attention in 1960s Toronto. The police did not believe Ford's claims that his mother was on vacation as they noticed that there was no evidence that she packed any clothing while her credit cards remained unused. The Toronto journalist Paul Hunter wrote in 2013: "“A character like Wayne Ford wasn’t supposed to exist in sleepy Willowdale. He operated a brothel out of the family bungalow, carried a sawed-off shotgun, shot a friend during a raucous house party, imported guns from Buffalo, dealt illegal drugs, robbed banks, agreed to do a contract killing and broke a man’s legs for cash.” Ford said of his actions at this time: "I was a royal shithead in a lot of ways and I was Mr. Stupid Teenager times ten that went bananas into criminality, which is what I wanted. I wanted to be a criminal".

Ford engaged in gun-running, buying handguns in Buffalo for $15 American per gun, smuggled them across the border and sold them in Toronto for $60 Canadian each. On 25 July 1963, Ford was arrested after someone was shot at a party he hosted. After serving a short prison sentence, Ford went to work in a factory in the fall of 1963. In February 1964, he was arrested for vagrancy. On 9 June 1964, he was convicted of theft and possession of stolen goods after he robbed a number of cottages in the Orillia area.

After his release, he moved to California, but was deported back to Canada. In late 1965, he was again convicted of theft and the possession of stolen goods for robbing a storage locker in Toronto. On 17 May 1966, Ford escaped from the Burwash prison and tried to flee Canada. Ford was arrested in Toronto and following his conviction for escaping lawful custody, he was sent to Kingston Penitentiary.

On 16 October 1966, Minnie Ford's corpse floated to the surface of Lake Couchiching and washed ashore. At the time, Ford was already in prison for other crimes and he was charged with first-degree murder. In May 1967, Ford went on trial for the first-degree murder of his mother. At his trial, Ford claimed self-defense, saying his mother attacked him with an ice pick. The Crown Attorney prosecuting Ford in response stated: "You’re six feet five, 220 pounds; your mother was five feet five, 140 pounds. You could have grabbed it.” Ford was convicted and sentenced to life imprisonment. Traditionally, people in Toronto viewed their city as "Toronto the Good", a puritanical city known for its low crime rate, and the Ford murder case came to be seen in the 1960s as a symbol of the moral decay of Toronto from "Toronto the Good" into being just another violent, crime-ridden North American city.

== The 1971 Kingston Penitentiary riot ==
The prisoner-writer Roger Caron wrote that the three toughest prisoners at Kingston penitentiary in 1971 were Ford, Barrie MacKenzie, Brian Beaucage who were all "natural leaders" who were "not to be fucked with" by the other prisoners.

On the night of 14 April 1971, Ford was in his cell when the prison riot began. Upon being released from his cell, Ford seized a metal pipe and went to the 1-F range where he knew that the prison guards taken hostage were being held. Ford wanted to protect the six prison guards taken hostage from being killed by the other prisoners. Ford told the hostages "I'm not here to hurt you" and he escorted the hostages to a safer location.

During the riot, Ford protected the hostages from violence at the hands of the other prisoners. On the final night of the riot, a group of prisoners led by David Shepley attempted to kill the hostages, but were stopped by Ford who quietly told Shepley "no way pal". Ford had a metal bar in his hand, and as no-one wanted to fight the 6'5 Ford, the gang led by Shepley abandoned their plans to kill the hostages and instead tortured the "undesirable" prisoners held in the 1-D range for child molesters and child killers.

== Parole ==
In 1975, Ford was released on parole. Ford resolved to leave behind his life of criminality after his release, and still reports to his parole officer once every three months. At present, Ford lives in a trailer park in British Columbia. Ford is active in the Life Line program under which he visits prisons to serve as a mentor to encourage prisoners' to reject criminality as a way of life.

== Books ==
- Fogarty, Catherine (2021). Murder on the Inside The True Story of the Deadly Riot at Kingston Penitentiary. Windsor: Biblioasis. ISBN 9781771964029.
