= Henry Champ =

Canadian journalist (1937–2012)

- Born: 12 July 1937; Brandon, Manitoba, Canada
- Died: 23 September 2012 (aged 75); Washington, D.C., US
- Occupation: Broadcast journalist
- Known for: Television news reportage worldwide
- Television: CTV News; W-5; NBC News; CBC News: Morning; The National
- Spouse: Karen DeYoung

Stephen Henry Champ (12 July 1937 – 23 September 2012) was a veteran Canadian broadcast journalist, working for CTV News, NBC News and CBC News.

Champ was born in Brandon, Manitoba on 12 July 1937, and studied arts at Brandon University in 1957 and 1958 (he did not graduate), with his first journalism job coming in 1960 as a sportswriter at the Brandon Sun. He transitioned to the world of television, working as a news correspondent at CTV for fifteen years, where he attained the role of Bureau Chief for CTV in Washington, D.C., Montreal and London.

During the 1971 Kingston Penitentiary riot, Champ was the only journalist willing to take up the offer of the leader of the riot, Billy Knight, to tour Kingston penitentiary. After touring the prison, Champ reported that the hostages were not being abused and "it was like a school without teachers". During this time, he was among the last correspondents to leave Vietnam during the fall of Saigon and among the first Canadian journalists to be admitted into the People's Republic of China. Champ also contributed to the CTV newsmagazine series W5 between 1978 and 1982 during which his pieces gained notoriety for exposing corruption and mishandling of Canadian foreign aid to Haiti, police brutality in Toronto, and the plight of a Canadian citizen wrongly imprisoned in Texas, amongst many other topics.

He then moved to the United States as a correspondent for NBC News for ten years, where he was assigned to the network's bureaus in Frankfurt, London and Warsaw, also serving for five years as NBC's congressional correspondent in Washington. In 1993 he returned to his home country to Halifax, Nova Scotia, in 1993 to become an news anchor for CBC News: Morning.

Champ received an honorary doctor of laws degree from Brandon University in 2005. He retired from the CBC in November 2008 after serving as the Washington correspondent for CBC Newsworld. and was appointed Chancellor of Brandon University for two three-year terms beginning in 2008. Champ's professional contributions were recognized with a 2009 RTNDA (Radio-Television News Directors Association of Canada) President's Award.

He continued to write a blog for the CBC's news website until his death on his farm outside of Washington, D.C., in 2012, leaving a wife and five children from two marriages.

== Books ==
- Fogarty, Catherine (2021). Murder on the Inside The True Story of the Deadly Riot at Kingston Penitentiary. Windsor: Biblioasis. ISBN 9781771964029.

Academic offices
Preceded by Edward Schreyer	Chancellor of Brandon University; 2009–2012	Succeeded by Michael Decter
