= Billy Knight (criminal) =

Canadian criminal (1943–1978)

William James Knight (17 March 1943 – 10 December 1978) was a Canadian criminal and convicted rapist who served as the leader of the 1971 Kingston Penitentiary riot.

== Early life and beginnings as a criminal ==
Knight was born into a very poor family in Don Mills, at the time a rural community outside of Toronto. Both of Knight's parents were illiterate and he was the fourth of eleven children. The Knight family were so poor that they lived in the barn of Knight's grandfather's farm. Both of his parents and his older siblings frequently beat him as a boy. He amassed a lengthy criminal record as a child as he took to shoplifting from the local A&P grocery store to feed himself, his parents and his siblings. He rarely attended school and often ran from his home to live on the streets. At the age of 14, after he was arrested for shoplifting, he was placed "in care". After his release at the age of 15, Knight stole an automobile and was sent to the Guelph Reformatory for the next year.

Knight made his living as a petty criminal, who worked mostly as a thief. At the age of 18 he married his girlfriend after she became pregnant with his child. However, being married and a father led Knight to steal more to support his new family. In 1966, Knight was convicted of theft after he broke into a Salvation Army store in Windsor. During his trial, he attempted to escape from the courthouse. He was sentenced to three years in prison. In 1969, while out on a parole, Knight smashed the window of a store in Kingston to steal some cigarettes. Knight's parole was revoked and he was sentenced to another 3 years in prison. In January 1970, he escaped from the Collins Bay Institution and fled into the wilderness of northern Ontario in a stolen automobile. Knight was arrested in Wawa after a lengthy chase though the snow-clad fields. Knight was sent to a hospital in Sault St. Marie to be treated for his frostbite and he again escaped, but was captured within a few blocks of the hospital. Knight was convicted of escaping lawful custody, resisting arrest and automobile theft and was sentenced to 7 years in prison at Kingston Penitentiary, the toughest prison in Canada.

== Kingston Penitentiary ==
Knight worked as the prison barber at Kingston penitentiary, which allowed him to know all of the inmates as the prison rules required that the inmates have short hair and no facial hair. Knight wore his own hair in an elaborate "1940s pompadour", which made him stand out in the prison. The Canadian journalist Catherine Fogarty described him as: "A well-liked, mouthy type, Knight never backed down from an argument. He was a strong advocate for exposing conditions within the prison and was always making impassioned speeches to anyone who would listen...He was a natural leader among the inmates". A member of the National Parole Board stated: "Knight could charm you out of your teeth, gold filings and all". Knight was writing an autobiography, The Walking Dead, which he believed would be a bestseller that would force public opinion to change prison conditions.

=== The Kingston Penitentiary riot ===
Sometime in March 1971, Knight began planning an uprising to take control of the prison. Knight's plan called for a group of prisoners to overpower the guards and then use the keys to release the other prisoners.

==== April 14, 1971 ====
On the night of 14 April 1971, Knight was watching TV in the recreation hall with the other prisoners when the prison bell rang at 10:30 pm, indicating that the prisoners were to go to bed. Knight and his followers were supposed go to separate ranges of the prison, but other prisoners agreed to swap places to allow Knight's group to join the same line-up. As the prisoners were being marched to the 2-H range, the guard Terry Decker failed to notice that some of the prisoners in the line-up belonged to other ranges. However, Decker did notice that Knight's shirt was not tucked in and ordered him "tuck that shirt in!" Knight, who believed that his plan was about to exposed, punched Decker in the stomach and shouted "That's the last fucking order you're going to give!" One of Knight's followers, Charles Saunders, seized the keys from Decker. Four of Knight's other followers, Brian Dodge, Robert Adams, Leo Barrieault, and Allan Lafreniere raced into the central dome of the prison before the other guards could shut the door that linked the recreation hall to the dome. Dodge tackled the prison guard Donald Flynn in the dome. Knight shouted out "finish him off and lock him up in F-block". Three other guards, Ed Barret, Joseph Valier and Douglas Dittrich standing by the prison bell were assaulted. Within a few minutes, Knight had six prison guards as hostages and control of the dome.

Knight used the keys he had seized to start opening up as many of the cells as possible. Knight then gave a speech, where he proclaimed: "Brothers! Our time has come to shake off the shackles. We've taken control of the dome and we've got six hostages. You will all be released from your cells". Knight used the phone system to call the warden, Arthur Jarvis, to tell him to order the guards to stop shooting as he threatened: "If there are any more shots fired, we'll start cutting off some fingers". Knight, who had a Messiah complex, gave another short speech to the freed prisoners where he said: "We've got hostages, men. We're not going to release them until our demands are met, and that, my brothers, will take days of hard talk. Have courage, my brothers, and remember when people have nothing to lose but themselves, only a coward would deny them the right to rebel. By sunrise we'll have direct communication with the outside world. Either we get penal reform or else we turn this shithouse into a parking lot!" When one of the inmates suggested killing the hostages, Knight admonished him: "Brothers, brothers! Let's not give the pigs the satisfaction of finding a reason to label us as animals to the world. We need the public's support and we won't get it by creating a bloodbath". The writer Roger Caron described Knight as "vaguely" giving his reasons for the riot. Caron wrote: "Billy Knight went on expounding his ideals from is lofty principles, foolishly blind to the negative whispers and silent maneuvers around him...One of these individuals with a mercurial temper was a handsome twenty-three old convict by the name of Brian Beaucage. Muscular and athletic, he seemed to operate on the principle that he either liked or disliked you according to your face. He obviously found Billy's profile entirely to his disliking and was itching for the opportunity to rearrange it".

Knight then went to the gymnasium. In the gymnasium, Knight confronted the guards who had forced the inmates against the wall at gunpoint. Knight approached the guard Bill Babcock and told him "let's talk". Babcock replied: "Anything I got to say to you will come from the mouth of this gun". Knight told him: "We've got full control of the dome and six hostages. I want you to release my brothers. Let them join me in my peaceful protest". When Babcock still refused, Knight left the gymnasium. Later that night, Knight met Jarvis in the gymnasium. Jarvis asked Knight: "What exactly do you want from us?" Knight answered: "For a start, we want positive results in our desire for decent living conditions." Jarvis backed down and allowed the 64 prisoners in the gymnasium to go into the dome to join the uprising.

The 1-D range in Kingston prison was for the "undesirables", the slang term used by both the prison guards and the prisoners to describe rapists, child molesters and child killers. Caron wrote: "Inadvertently Billy Knight ended with one very gruesome responsibility he hadn't planned on: keeping alive fourteen child molesters and rapists in the protection unit". Knight had the keys to the 1-D range along with what Caron called the "reluctant support" of Barrie MacKenzie, an especially tough and respected prisoner, against violence being done to the men in the 1-D range. However, two prisoners were able to climb into the 1-D range via the top tiers of the building and broke into the cells. Knight tried to protect the prisoners in the 1-D range from violence, which he believed would alienate Canadian public opinion. Knight stopped one child molester, James Bell, from being beaten to death by the other prisoners and contacted the prison hospital: "We have an emergency situation here. An inmate is bleeding to death". Together with MacKenzie, Knight saved the life of a child molester, Brian Ensor, whom the other prisoners were trying to throw to his death from the third floor. When the prisoners smashed up and destroyed the Protestant and Catholic chapels, Knight ordered the prisoners to use the debris to build makeshift barricades.

==== April 15, 1971 ====
The next morning, Knight called Jarvis to demand food and coffee for the prisoners. Jarvis at first refused Knight's demands, but relented after Knight threatened violence against the hostages. Knight called Gerry Retzer of the CKLC radio station to tell him: "We've taken hostages". Knight told Retzer he wanted to call a press conference to address the Canadian people about his demands. At 10: 45 am, Knight had his press conference which was attended by the journalists Gerry Retzer of the CKLC station, Henry Champ of CTV News, Graham Cox of the Canadian Press, and William Baird and Sheldon MacNeil of the Kingston Whig-Standard.

Knight read out his demands as he stated: "We're sick of being zombies. This is our last-ditch stand against the inhumanities the prisoners will face upon a forced transfer to Millhaven". Knight claimed that the vast majority of the prisoners were not criminals, but rather victims of an unjust society who had been forced against their wills into lives of crime by what he claimed was the oppressive nature of Canadian society. Knight's repeated references to the "unjust society" were a clear allusion to the "just society" that the Liberals under the leadership of Pierre Trudeau had promised in the 1968 election. Knight also claimed that the prison guards routinely beat the prisoners and that two prisoners had been nearly beaten to death by the guards in an incident in January 1971. Knight called the uprising a peaceful political protest, which led Jarvis who had also attended the conference to say: "You threatened to cut off their fingers if any more shots were fired". Knight replied: "We could chop off heads instead of fingers". Knight then went on a lengthy rant about the police forces of Canada, who he claimed routinely beat criminals and accused the police of framing many of the men in Kingston prison. Knight finally submitted a list of demands that called for a citizens' committee to mediate the riot as Knight did not trust the Crown to negotiate in good faith. Knight invited the reporter Henry Champ of CTV News to tour the prison along with his camera crew, an offer that was accepted. Knight allowed Champ and his crew to interview one of the hostages, Ed Barrett, who stated that the reports in the media that the inmates were engaged in the physical and sexual abuse of the hostages were not true.

In response, a citizens' committee was formed. At the first meeting, Desmond Morton, an Irish immigrant and law professor at the University of Toronto asked Knight what he wanted. Knight in response stated: "We just want this whole farce exposed. We want the outside world to know that they are doing to us in this festering hellhole". Knight's demands to the citizens' committee centered around allegations of police brutality and that many of the inmates had convicted of crimes they had not committed as Knight asserted: "Others will swear they were forced to talk by having their testicles nailed to a chair". Knight's other set of demands concerned the treatment of inmates at Kingston penitentiary as Knight complained about collective punishments where all inmates were punished for the actions of a few.

==== April 16, 1971 ====
When the soldiers of the Royal Canadian Regiment arrived at Kingston Penitentiary on 16 April 1971, the inmates were thrown into panic at the sight of the soldiers who they believed were going to massacre them. Knight called Jarvis to tell him: "You pull those guys out of here or you've got problems".

During the talks with the citizens' committee, the members of the committee quickly grew tired of Knight, who had a tendency to grandstand and to make unrealistic demands such as a pardon for all of the criminal actions committed during the riot. Knight told Arthur Martin of the citizens' committee: "Without a promise of total immunity, we won't guarantee the safety of the hostages". The citizens' committee came to respect MacKenzie, whose cool demeanor and common sense stood in marked contrast to Knight's angry behaviour and absurdly unrealistic demands. When Knight continued to insist that a pardon was still possible, MacKenzie told him: "You're the only one who's saying that". Martin told Knight: "You have the choice between hanging for the capital murder of a prison guard or accepting charges of kidnapping". MacKenzie added: "We don't want your ping-pong prizes. Most of your grievances are silly. The object is to get the guys out of here". Finally, Knight accepted that a pardon was not possible and stated: "All we ask is the Solicitor-General give his word we will not be mistreated". Knight agreed to a deal under which the guards would not beat the inmates if they surrendered and a promise that Jean-Pierre Goyer, the Solicitor-General, would agree to review prison conditions in exchange for ending the riot. Knight stated: "It won't be easy. Without a majority of the inmates agreeing, a settlement won't be achieved". However, Goyer went on national radio to declare that the Crown would not make any deals with the prisoners. The prisoners had transistor radios and were very well aware of Goyer's speech.

When Knight presented the deal he struck, he was attacked on the stage by an especially violent prisoner, Brian Beaucage. Beaucage seized the megaphone from Knight and told him: "You've had it, you're through talking". MacKenzie in turn seized the megaphone from Beaucage and gave it back to Knight. Knight told the inmates: "We've lost our civil rights and now we are on the verge of losing our human rights". Despite his brave words, it was clear that Knight's authority had collapsed and that the inmates were now led by rival factions loyal to Beaucage and MacKenzie.

== Later life and death ==
After the riot ended on 18 April 1971, Knight was sent to Millhaven Institution, where he was beaten bloody by the Millhaven guards as soon as he arrived. Knight's skull was fractured as a result of the beating and he spent the next month in a hospital. The Millhaven prison guards especially hated Knight as the man who started the riot at Kingston Penitentiary and singled out for an especially vicious beating as he was attacked by the prison guard Grant Snider with a nightstick as soon he stepped off the bus. Caron wrote that Knight was "struck over the head so hard that his skull cracked like an egg". Bleeding badly, Knight was then forced to run a gauntlet of prison guards who beat him with nightsticks. When Knight collapsed, another prison guard, Bernard Evans, repeatedly punched him in the face.

Knight was charged with kidnapping the six prison guards taken hostage. Of the inmates that faced charges of kidnapping, Knight was the only one who refused to make a plea bargain with the Crown. On 17 August 1971, the accused pleaded guilty to the lesser charge of forcible seizure while Knight refused, saying the taking of hostages was only an act of protest. During the preliminary hearing, Knight changed his appearance by growing his hair long along with a moustache and while he did not need glasses, he wore glasses at the preliminary hearing. The Crown Attorney, John Sampson, asked Decker if he could identify Knight as the man who punched him in the stomach on the night of 14 April. Despite the fact that Knight was sitting right opposite him, Decker testified that Knight was not in the courtroom as he could not see him. Another guard, William Babcock, likewise testified that he could not see Knight in the courtroom despite the way that Knight was sitting right next to his lawyer Barry Swadron. Sampson complained that Knight was "hiding in plain sight" as he was sitting in the defendant's docket, but that none of the guards could recognize him with Knight wearing glasses and having long hair. Another two of the guards taken hostage, Joseph Vallier and Douglas Dale, failed to identify Knight as being in the courtroom when asked to do so by Sampson. With none of the guards being able to identify Knight, Justice Donald Graham dismissed the charges of kidnapping against Knight under the grounds that the Crown had failed to establish a case against Knight. As Knight left the courtroom, he left behind the pair of glasses he had been wearing, which he no longer needed.

Knight sued the Crown and Goyer personally for the beating he had endured at Millhaven. Knight won his civil law case with the judge ruling that Knight had been the victim of an injustice. Knight was awarded $3,500, of which he gave $1,000 to a children's charity. Knight was caught up in a lengthy custody dispute with his ex-wife over his daughters, Sherry and Kelly, whom his ex-wife wanted to be adopted by her current husband under the grounds that Knight had not seen his daughters for nearly a decade. In April 1972, Knight was interviewed by the journalist Ron Haggart of The Globe & Mail newspaper. Knight told Haggart about why he had started the riot: "I had a bellyful of bitterness, frustration and disgust that was slowly eating me alive". He still insisted the riot was only an act of peaceful protest as he told Haggart: "Kingston was a living, breathing hell-hole and I chose to destroy it before it could destroy me". Knight told Haggart that he carefully planned the uprising in advance for a month and that "I anticipated seizing the entire institution". Knight was still working on his memoir, The Walking Dead, which he believed would be a bestseller if he could only find a publisher. Knight also told Haggart that he wanted out of prison so that he could see his daughters and be the father that he so far had failed to be.

Knight was held in solitary confinement at Millhaven for almost a year after the Kingston riot, and was then sent to a prison in British Columbia. Knight escaped in 1975 and settled in Chatham. During his period of freedom, Knight stole an automobile, used a gun to rob a Sunoco gas station and raped a 15-year-old girl. The girl was an employee of the Sunoco gas station that Knight robbed, and he forced her at gunpoint into his stolen car. Afterwards, Knight raped the unfortunate girl. During a trip to Windsor, Knight was arrested. Knight was convicted of escaping lawful custody, theft, armed robbery and rape.

The rape conviction ended Knight's chances of having The Walking Dead published as no publisher wanted to publish a book by a convicted rapist. In October 1975, Knight was sent back to Millhaven and in November 1976 he was transferred to Saskatchewan Penitentiary. As a rapist, Knight had to live apart as an "undesirable" from the other prisoners, which caused him to suffer from depression. During his time in Saskatchewan, Knight attempted to commit suicide by slashing his Achilles tendon as he found living alone in his cell all the time to be psychologically stressful. The file on Knight stated: "Knight is a very demanding individual who can strongly display his rather volatile character. He is an unpredictable person who has developed an extremely questionable reputation throughout his exposure to the corrections system. Wherever he goes, trouble follows". Knight died suddenly of still unexplained reasons on 10 December 1978 at the age of 35.

== Books ==
- Caron, Roger (1985). Bingo! The Horrifying Eyewitness Account of a prison riot. Toronto: Methuen. ISBN 0458997005.
- Fogarty, Catherine (2021). Murder on the Inside The True Story of the Deadly Riot at Kingston Penitentiary. Windsor: Biblioasis. ISBN 9781771964029.
- Haggart, Ron (2012). Cool Heads at Kingston Pen. Toronto: House of Haggart.
- Hennessy, Peter (1999). Canada's Big House The Dark History of the Kingston Penitentiary. Toronto: Dundurn. ISBN 9781550023305.
