= Michael Valpy =

Canadian journalist and author

- Born: Michael Granville Valpy; 1942 (age 83–84); Toronto, Ontario, Canada
- Occupations: Journalist, author
- Spouse: Deborah Coyne (divorced)
- Children: 3

Michael Granville Valpy (born 1942) is a Canadian journalist and author. He wrote for The Globe and Mail, where he covered both political and human interest stories until he left the newspaper in October 2010. Through a long career at the newspaper, he was a reporter, Toronto- and Ottawa-based national political columnist, member of the editorial board, deputy managing editor, and Africa-based correspondent during the last years of apartheid. He has also been a national political columnist for the Vancouver Sun. He has been published by the newspaper on a freelance basis, as well as by CBC News Online, the Toronto Star, and the National Post.

== Life ==
Valpy was born in 1942 in Toronto and lived there until his family moved to Vancouver, where his mother's family was from, after World War II. His great-grandfather, W. W. Walkem, was Vancouver's first European doctor and the brother of George Anthony Walkem, British Columbia's third premier. He has three children. He has been married and divorced twice, first with The Globe and Mail's former chief librarian, Amanda Ferguson, and second with lawyer Deborah Coyne.

== Career ==
Valpy studied at the University of British Columbia towards a general arts degree for two years before dropping out of university after the premature death of his father and having no money to continue his studies. After considering entering the Anglican priesthood, Valpy went to work for the Vancouver Sun in 1961 as a reporter and was then night city editor at the short-lived Vancouver Times. In 1965, when the Vancouver Times folded, he was hired by The Globe and Mail first as a reporter, then as a feature writer and member of the editorial board. In 1966 and 1967, Valpy was a staff member for the short-lived Company of Young Canadians. He returned to the Vancouver Sun, first as a member of its editorial board and then as a political columnist based in Ottawa, Ontario.

On 13 December 1971, Valpy revealed in an article the secret deal brokered by Justice William Henderson to end the trial of the "Kingston 13." During the 1971 Kingston Penitentiary riot, a group of inmates, led by Brian Beaucage, had tortured 16 men and killed two of them. In October 1971, the "Kingston 13," as the accused were known, went on trial in Kingston. Valpy revealed that there had been a secret deal to end the trial, as Henderson had called several meetings with the defence lawyers and the Crown attorneys to discuss how to arrange plea bargains to give the accused the lightest possible sentences, which led to a sudden end to the trial on 22 November 1971.

In 1981, he rejoined The Globe and Mail as a national affairs columnist and subsequently served as its Africa correspondent from 1984 to 1988. He then returned to Canada to serve as the newspaper's urban affairs columnist; its deputy managing editor; and, after running for Parliament for the NDP, the paper's religion writer and feature writer.

Valpy left The Globe and Mail in 2010. He is a senior fellow at Massey College at the University of Toronto, a fellow at the University of Toronto School of Public Policy and Governance and teaches in the university's book and media studies program. He was the 2011–2012 Canwest Global Fellow in Media at University of Western Ontario and was awarded the 2012–2013 Atkinson Fellowship in Public Policy. He continues to write as a freelance journalist with pieces published on the CBC News website and the Toronto Star as well as The Globe and Mail.

== Political views ==
Despite being from what he describes as a "strongly Tory monarchist British imperialist-quite right wing" family, Valpy was one of the more left-leaning writers at The Globe and Mail. In the 2000 federal election, Valpy ran as a New Democratic Party candidate in the Toronto riding of Trinity—Spadina, against Liberal Party of Canada incumbent, Tony Ianno. Valpy was not elected.

== Works ==
Valpy co-authored three books (two on the Constitution of Canada and the third on the 21st-century generation of new Canadian adults), produced public affairs documentaries for CBC Radio, contributed chapters to several books on public policy issues and written for Maclean's, Time Canada, Policy Options, Shambhala Sun and Elm Street magazines.

== Awards ==
He has won three National Newspaper Awards (two for foreign reporting and one for an analysis of dysfunctional students in the public education system) and been nominated for a fourth (for a profile of Michael Ignatieff).

In 1997, he was awarded an honorary doctorate (D.Litt.) from Trent University.

He received the Queen's Jubilee Medal in 2002.

== Books ==
- Fogarty, Catherine (2021). Murder on the Inside The True Story of the Deadly Riot at Kingston Penitentiary. Windsor: Biblioasis. ISBN 9781771964029.
