= Barrie MacKenzie =

Canadian criminal

Barrie MacKenzie (born 1944), sometimes spelled Barrie McKenzie, was a Canadian criminal who was credited with a key role in ending the 1971 Kingston Penitentiary riot.

== Early criminal career ==
MacKenzie was born in Hamilton into a broken home. During his childhood, he was placed "in care" and grew up in 14 different foster homes, lonely and unloved. After being convicted of theft, he was sent to the Guelph Reformatory. In 1968, he was arrested for armed robbery and escaped from the Halton County jail in Milton by knocking out a policeman. Within half an hour, MacKenzie was recaptured.

MacKenzie was sentenced later in 1968 to 8 years in prison for armed robbery, escaping lawful custody and assaulting a police officer with his sentence to be served at Kingston Penitentiary, the toughest prison in Canada. The prisoner-writer Roger Caron wrote that MacKenzie, Brian Beaucage and Wayne Ford were the three toughest prisoners at Kingston penitentiary who were all "natural leaders" and were "not to be fucked with" by the other inmates. The journalist Catherine Forgarty wrote that "...MacKenzie was a clean-cut, muscular guy who was known as a con's con-tough as nails and well respected. He adhered to the prisoners' code and wasn't afraid to stick his neck out to help others".

== The Kingston Penitentiary riot ==
On the evening of 14 April 1971, MacKenzie was in his cell in the 3-B range when he was released by another prisoner who had been handed the keys by Billy Knight, the leader of the uprising. Knight assigned MacKenzie to the inmate "police force" in charge of keeping order along with Ford and Beaucage. MacKenzie protected the "undesirable" prisoners in the 4-D range for child molesters from the other prisoners. When two prisoners attempted to kill a child molester, Brian Ensor, MacKenzie came to his aid and forced Ensor against his will into a cell for his own protection. MacKenzie took turns guarding the six prison guards while being ordered to kill them if the Crown should try to storm the prison. Caron observed that MacKenzie and Beaucage were friends, but felt that there was much tension under their superficial friendship and the two would soon turn on each other. On 16 April, MacKenzie freed one of the hostages, Terry Decker, as a good faith gesture intended to end the uprising peacefully.

A citizens' committee had formed to mediate an end to the crisis. MacKenzie came to form a strong rapport with one of the citizens' committee, Ron Haggart, the crime correspondent of the Toronto Telegram newspaper. Haggart was the member of the citizens' committee that MacKenzie trusted the most. Caron wrote between Haggart and MacKenzie "a bond of trust began to develop between the two strong personalities". When the soldiers of the Royal Canadian Regiment arrived at Kingston penitentiary, Haggart assured MacKenzie during a phone call that he just spoken with Major Edward Richmond, the commander of the task force, who in turn promised him that the prison would not be stormed as long the lives of the hostages were not in danger.

During the talks, MacKenzie who sat on the inmates' committee impressed the citizens committee with his "cool demeanor" and being more reasonable than Knight who made absurd demands that the Crown would never accept. When the lawyer Arthur Martin of the citizens committee told Knight that the Solicitor-General, Jean-Pierre Goyer, had rejected his demand for immunity, Knight began angry and agitated. MacKenzie told Knight: "Dummy up, just dummy up, we're getting tired of your bullshit". When Knight continued to press for pardon, MacKenzie tensely told him: "You're the only who's saying that". Martin told Knight: "You have a choice between hanging for capital murder of a prison guard or accepting charges of kidnapping". When Knight persisted with his demand for amnesty, MacKenzie snapped at him: "We don't want your ping-pong prizes. Most of your grievances are silly. The object is get the guys out of here". MacKenzie offered the terms of a surrender as a "pro rata arrangement" where 100 prisoners would be freed for every hostage freed, and a promise that the guards would not beat the prisoners after the crisis ended. MacKenzie also wanted a promise that the inmates would not be sent to Millhaven Institution and that the Crown not announce the inmates were being sent to other prisons other than Millhaven, saying: "That saves the government the embarrassment of giving in to our demands. The public won't known the government made a deal with us". The committee and then the Crown agreed to the terms that MacKenzie had offered. The meeting ended with MacKenzie stealing the cigarette package of Ron Haggart as he left the room.

When Knight presented the terms of the deal before the prisoners, Beaucage stormed onto the stage to scream at Knight, saying "you're full of shit!" Goyer had just given a speech on the radio saying the Crown would offer no deal, which Beaucage was aware by listening to the radio. As Beaucage tried to assault Knight, MacKenzie told him "go easy man". After the meeting, Knight's authority over the inmates collapsed. MacKenzie favored surrender to save the lives of the prisoners as Kingston penitentiary was surrounded by the soldiers of the Royal Canadian Regiment and the prisoners were cold, tired, and hungry. MacKenzie also knew the more extreme group led by Beaucage wanted the uprising to end in a bloodbath and that Beaucage would demand an "open vote" instead of a "silent vote" on the terms of the surrender. MacKenzie knew that the majority of the prisoners would vote to surrender in a "silent vote", but not in an "open vote" out of the fear of looking cowardly. Caron wrote in his 1985 memoir Bingo!: "Barrie MacKenzie, who had no ax to grind with anyone wanted a peaceful solution to the bingo [prison riot] so that people wouldn't die. He wasn't the type to make fancy speeches or drum up specific grievances; nevertheless, he found himself more and more at the centre stage. His position was akin to that of a passenger abroad a hijacked airliner who finds both pilots zonked, and being a man of action undertakes the monumental task of trying to land it with instructions from the tower". In an attempt to persuade the inmates to surrender, MacKenzie gave a speech saying: "I'm not here to tell you guys what to do, but if you decide to pack it all in and let the hostages go, then you have my word that I'll be the last man out, with the last screw [prison guard]".

When the prison guards used their axes to hack a hole though the barricaded wooden door to create an opening for a fire hose in case the inmates should set fire to the prison, it caused panic inside the prison. The inmates assumed it was the beginning of an assault and the cry went out "The army is coming! The army is coming!" The inmates began to prepare a defense by smashed the lightbulbs, armed themselves with their makeshift weapons and placed mattresses against the door. MacKenzie admonished the inmates as he shouted: "For fuck's sake, you guys better get with it or a lot of us are going to die!" MacKenzie stated that it was time to surrender as it was only a matter before the Royal Canadian Regiment stormed the prison, and given that the soldiers had guns while the inmates did not, such a battle could only end with a massive loss of life. At that point, the inmate David Shepley shouted with a megaphone: "Nobody is giving up the pigs! No more talking, it's time to fight! We're calling the shots from now on. Ain't nobody giving up!" Beaucage stood next to Shepley and menacingly had a steel pipe in his hand. MacKenzie went to meet the citizens committee, saying the mood was very dangerous in the prison as Shepley and Beacuage were on the brink of doing something reckless and that he needed a concession to sell the other inmates on the idea of surrender.

On the night of 17–18 April 1971, a group of inmates led by Beaucage tortured 16 of the "undesirables" from the 1-D wing and killed two. To put a stop to what was threatening to become a massacre, MacKenzie made a decision to release the hostages early on the morning of 18 April 1971. Without the hostages, the prisoners would be forced to surrender as it was known that the Army would storm the prison immediately if there was no concern for the lives of the hostages. MacKenzie used the still intact phone system to call Haggart shortly before 5 am to ask him: "How much do we have to make a decision?" Haggart answered "until 5:15 am", and then corrected himself by saying: "you have to make a decision by 5 am. You've got to be ready to release the hostages immediately and come out when ordered". MacKenzie replied: "We need more time. We're not on the same wavelength in here". MacKenzie wanted Haggart to give him a promise that the inmates would not be beaten by the guards once they surrendered and then hung up. At 5: 07 am, MacKenzie called Haggart again to inquire: "How much longer do we have?" Haggart did not know that the Army would assault the prison at noon the next day, and informed MacKenzie: "It's dawn and the army always attacks at dawn". Haggart later admitted that: "I made it up. I had no idea what the war plan was for invading the penitentiary and I still do not know."

MacKenzie said he needed more time as some of the other inmates still did not want to release the hostages, but was told by Haggart: "I can't guarantee what will happen in the next half-hour. I suggest in the next two minutes you get a decision". Haggart heard MacKenzie shout to the other inmates at the top of his voice: "you guys have two minutes to make up your fucking minds!" MacKenzie then informed Haggart he would be releasing the hostages in exchange for a promise that the guards would not beat the prisoners if they surrendered. Caron wrote that "Barrie MacKenzie was succeeding through sheer force of personality in bringing the rudderless bingo to an end without massive bloodshed".

The knowledge that the hostages were being released led to a rush to surrender before the Army stormed the prison. A scene of pandemonium ensured as hundreds of prisoners attempted to rush out of the front gate to surrender to be confronted by a squad of soldiers with their bayonets' drawn along with the law professor Desmond Morton of the citizens' committee. Morton shouted to the prisoners in his Irish accent "come forward one at a time, one at a time". When the inmates all pressed forward at once, the soldiers fired warning shots into the air. Haggart who was still on the phone with MacKenzie told him "don't go into the corridor". MacKenzie screamed "tell the fucking screws to back off", but Haggart told him "they're holding their fire". Haggart stated that it was time to release the hostage to calm the situation down. At 6 am, MacKenzie personally walked out the first hostage to be freed, who was Kerry Bushell, who was promptly embraced by his wife. To prevent beatings, MacKenzie told Haggart that he would release one hostage for every sixty prisoners, a demand that Goyer rejected as the solicitor-general wanted all of the hostages freed at once. When MacKenzie refused that demand, Goyer eventually accepted MacKenzie's terms. Over the course of the next hour, the hostages were released. The last prisoner to surrender was MacKenzie who was greeted by Haggart and Goyer as he walked out. Haggart went up to shake MacKenzie's hand and told him: "Thank you, Barrie. You are a great man". MacKenzie refused to shake Haggart's hand and replied: "Fuck off! I didn't do it for you. I did it for the guys in there". Despite MacKenzie's rudeness, Haggart began his story for the Toronto Telegram newspaper: "Inside Kingston Penitentiary I met Barrie MacKenzie. He is the bravest man I have ever known and he will hate me for saying so." Haggart wrote that MacKenzie had "an endless flow of paranoid fears and delusions" but that he "brought Kingston Penitentiary under control again when it had gone mad."

On 19 April, Aubrey Golden of the citizens committee told the Toronto media: "The hero of the Kingston Penitentiary riot is a prisoner named Barrie MacKenzie...MacKenzie went back in there alone and negotiated all night long. He risked his life going back in there and he prevented a bloodbath". Morton in a press conference on the same day praised MacKenzie, saying that when he back into the prison alone on the final night that it was like a scene out of a Western as Morton stated: "He said, "I'm off". I thought he would get the last hostage out but we would never see him again. I thought he was going to his death". The journalist Steve Paikin wrote that MacKenzie "...demonstrated calm leadership in the face of incredibly chaotic circumstances." The journalist Gant Buckler wrote that the Kingston prison riot did not end the same way as the Attica Prison riot did was in large part due to the team that negotiated the terms of the surrender instead of having an assault on the prison. Buckler wrote that the most important members of the team that ended the crisis more or less peacefully were MacKenzie and Haggart. The promise that the prisoners would not be beaten by the guards was not honored. The prisoners who surrendered were sent to Millhaven and were all beaten bloody by the Millhaven guards as they arrived.

== Murder conviction and disappearance ==
In 1972, MacKenzie was granted parole. In 1976, his parole was revoked after it was discovered that he failed to obtain employment since his release. In 1983, his embittered ex-wife accused him of a 1975 murder in Windsor. On 25 January 1984, MacKenzie was convicted of second degree murder. In 1990, MacKenzie was released from Collins Bay Institution on parole and vanished, never to be seen or heard from again. The fate of MacKenzie remains a mystery.

== Books ==
- Caron, Roger (1985). Bingo! The Horrifying Eyewitness Account of a prison riot. Toronto: Methuen. ISBN 0458997005.
- Fogarty, Catherine (2021). Murder on the Inside The True Story of the Deadly Riot at Kingston Penitentiary. Windsor: Biblioasis. ISBN 9781771964029.
- Haggart, Ron (2012). Cool Heads at Kingston Pen. Toronto: House of Haggart.
